= Alberto Oliart =

Spanish politician (1928–2021)

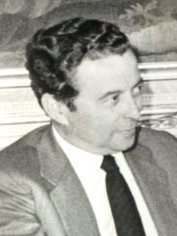
- Oliart in 1982

Chair of RTVE
- In office 26 November 2009 – 6 July 2011
- Preceded by: Luis Fernández Fernández
- Succeeded by: Leopoldo González-Echenique

Minister of Defence of Spain
- In office 26 February 1981 – 3 December 1982
- Prime Minister: Leopoldo Calvo-Sotelo
- Preceded by: Agustín Rodríguez Sahagún
- Succeeded by: Narcís Serra

Minister of Health and Social Security of Spain
- In office 9 September 1980 – 26 September 1981
- Prime Minister: Adolfo Suárez
- Preceded by: Juan Rovira Tarazona
- Succeeded by: Jesús Sancho Rof

Minister of Industry and Energy of Spain
- In office 5 July 1977 – 28 February 1978
- Prime Minister: Adolfo Suárez
- Preceded by: Carlos Pérez de Bricio
- Succeeded by: Agustín Rodríguez Sahagún

Member of the Congress of Deputies
- In office 9 March 1979 – 31 August 1982
- Constituency: Badajoz

Personal details
- Born: 29 July 1928 Mérida, Spain
- Died: 13 February 2021 (aged 92) Madrid, Spain
- Party: UCD (1978–1980s)
- Education: University of Barcelona
- Occupation: Politician, state lawyer, business executive, stockbreeder, writer

Alberto Carlos Oliart Saussol (29 July 1928 – 13 February 2021) was a Spanish politician and executive. He was a government minister three times during the Spanish transition to democracy and chairman of Spanish Radio and Television Corporation between 2009 and 2011.

During his time as Minister of Defence, Oliart had to deal with the situation in the Armed Forces after the unsuccessful 1981 coup d'état, thwarted a new coup attempt in 1982, and oversaw Spain's entry into NATO.

== Early life ==
Born on 29 July 1928 in Mérida, his father was Antonio Oliart Ruiz, a wealthy conservative who had fled Barcelona with the help of the socialist deputy Antonio Fernández Bolaño because of the repression that was unleashed against the rightists after the failure of the July 1936 coup in the Catalan capital. He first took refuge in Mérida, recently taken by Francisco Franco's troops. There, the commander of the Civil Guard, Manuel Gómez Cantos, was about to arrest him because he was convinced that he was a Catalan spy. Antonio Oliart managed to escape again and finally landed in Burgos, the capital of the rebellious Spain.

He earned a Licentiate degree in Law at the University of Barcelona in 1950 and, three years later, in 1953, he joined the State Lawyers Corps, Following this, he married Carmen Delgado de Torres Florez, a member of a family that has been part of the economic and social elite since the 10th century, when her ancestors were already wealthy nobles at the court of Ordoño II, King of Asturias and León. The extensive Delgado de Torres family includes the Entrecanales, current owners of Acciona; the Gómez-Acebo family, aristocrats related to the royal family; and the Bustelo family, the maternal family of Leopoldo Calvo-Sotelo; among others. His wife's family connections partly explain some of the appointments and responsibilities that Oliart attained throughout his career. He served as State Lawyer until 1965, when he was appointed Chief Administrative and Finance Officer of Renfe.

He was also member of the board of directors of the Banco Urquijo, Explosivos Río Tinto, Río Tinto Minera and Barral Editores.

== Political career ==
=== Minister of Industry (1977–1978) and Deputy ===
Appointed Minister of Industry and Energy by Prime Minister Adolfo Suárez, Oliart was sworn in on 5 July 1977. He left the post in February 1978. Later in the year, Oliart joined the Union of the Democratic Centre (UCD) in December 1978 and ran as candidate to the Congress of Deputies, 2nd in the UCD list for the 1979 general election in the constituency of Badajoz. Elected member of the 1st Congress of Deputies, he chaired the Committee on Defense of the Lower House from May 1979 to September 1980.

=== Minister of Health and Social Security (1980–1981) ===
He was appointed Minister of Health and Social Security in the fifth Suárez's cabinet on 8 September 1980 after a reshuffling of the government and until 26 February 1981.

=== Minister of Defence (1981–1982) ===
Some days after the 23-F, on 26 February 1981, he was appointed Minister of Defence in the new cabinet presided over by Leopoldo Calvo Sotelo.

One of the first things he did when he took office was to meet with each of the captains general to find out their views on the coup, learning that the majority agreed with the proposal of the general Alfonso Armada to establish a new provisional government. During the subsequent trial of the coup plotters, he had to intervene in the process to replace the president of the military court because he was unable to maintain the order of the sessions, which were especially tense and where the defendants caused disorder. The Supreme Council of Military Justice issued a ruling on 3 June 1982 condemning the perpetrators of the coup. Faced with popular rejection of the low penalties for which they were convicted, Oliart ordered the prosecutor in the case to appeal the sentence on 10 June 1982. The Supreme Court ended up raising the years of prison sentence with a sentence dated 22 April 1983.

On 1 October 1982, the Supreme Court rejected the complaints filed by the insurgent military officers Jaime Milans del Bosch and Antonio Tejero against Oliart and Prime Minister Calvo-Sotelo, accusing the Defense Minister of attacking judicial independence for urging on behalf of the government recourse to the sentences that condemned them to prison.

Oliart was also in charge of the reform of the Superior Center of Defense Information, naming on 23 May 1981 Lieutenant Colonel Emilio Alonso Manglano as its director with the mission of control and neutralization of any type of suspicious movement after the coup.

On the night of 1 October 1982 Manglano summoned Prime Minister Calvo Sotelo, Oliart and the Minister of the Interior Juan José Rosón to a meeting. At that meeting, which lasted several hours, Manglano unveiled a coup d'état conspiracy that several military officials were preparing that was going to be especially bloody, and that was going to be executed on 27 October 1982, the day before the general election. After the meeting, the immediate arrest of the leaders was ordered and they were able to dismantle them on 2 October 1982.

He was the architect of the entry of Spain into NATO, which materialized on 30 May 1982. He appointed the first civilian to a high position in the ministry, appointing Eduardo Serra Rexach Under-Secretary of State for Defence on 12 February 1982.

With the victory of the PSOE in the 1982 general election, Oliart ceased office on 2 December 1982 and was succeeded by Narcís Serra the following day.

== Chairman of RTVE ==
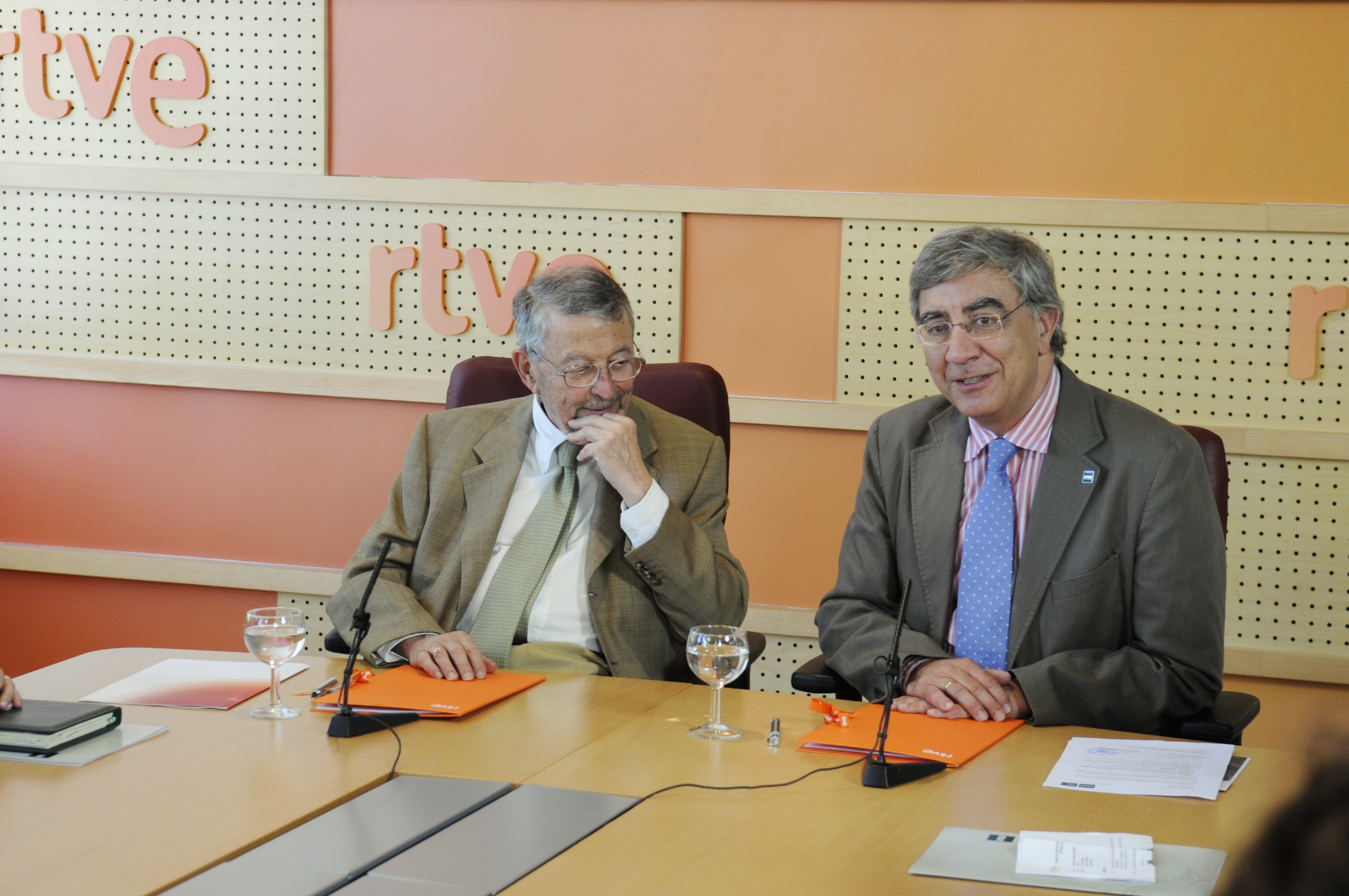
Oliart (left) next to the rector of the UNED in 2010.

He was appointed as President of RTVE on 11 November 2009. Proposed as consensus candidate between the Spanish Socialist Workers' Party and the People's Party as he had to be ratified by a 2/3 qualified majority in the Congress of Deputies, the appointment was questioned on the basis of the age of the octogenarian candidate and his lack of media training. He took office on 26 November 2009 after assuming the position of member of the Board of Directors in the Congress of Deputies.

During his tenure, TVE stopped broadcasting advertising and consolidated itself as audience leader, despite criticism of manipulation of the news by PP.

He resigned on 6 July 2011 for "reasons of strict personal character and mature reflection", but after jumping to the controversy that he gave his son a public contract.

== Personal life and death ==
Oliart married Carmen de Torres Flores, with whom he had six children. One of them, Isabel Oliart, was married to the singer-songwriter Joaquín Sabina and had two daughters.

After leaving active politics, he returned to his activity as a lawyer and started a cattle breeding business on his Los Rafaeles farm in Badajoz. Between 1995 and 2004 he was associated with the Madrid lawyer José Manuel Romero Moreno. A fan of writing, in 1997 he won the X Comillas Award for Biography, Autobiography and Memories for Against Oblivion ("Contra el olvido"), an autobiographical book, in which he recalls events that marked his life from childhood to adulthood. His second autobiographical book, entitled The years that changed everything ("Los años que lo cambiaron todo") was published in 2019.

Oliart died from COVID-19 after being admitted to a hospital in Madrid on 13 February 2021, aged 92 during the COVID-19 pandemic in Spain.

== Decorations ==
- Grand Cross of the Order of Charles III (1978)
- Grand Cross of the Order of Isabella the Catholic (1982)
- Grand Cross of the Order of Military Merit, with White Decoration (1985)
- Grand Cross of the Order of the Agricultural, Fishing and Food Merit (1994)
- Medal of Extremadura (1998)
- Grand Cross of the Order of Naval Merit (1999)

Political offices
Preceded by Carlos Pérez de Bricio	Minister of Energy and Industry; 1977–1978	Succeeded by Agustín Rodríguez Sahagún
Preceded by Enrique Múgica Herzog	Chair of the Committee on Defense of the Congress of Deputies; 1979–1980	Succeeded by Guillermo Medina González
Preceded by Juan Rovira Tarazona	Minister of Health and Social Security; 1980–1981	Succeeded by Jesús Sancho Rof
Preceded by Agustín Rodríguez Sahagún	Minister of Defence; 1981–1982	Succeeded by Narcís Serra
Business positions
Preceded by Luis Fernández Fernández	Chairman of RTVE; 2009–2011	Succeeded by Leopoldo González-Echenique
