= Francisco Laína =

Spanish politician (1936–2022)

Francisco Laína García
- Born: 18 May 1936; La Carrera, Spain
- Died: 7 January 2022 (aged 85); Ávila, Spain

Francisco Laína García (18 May 1936 – 7 January 2022) was a Spanish politician, who was the Director of State Security during the coup d'état of 23 February 1981. After being appointed by King Juan Carlos, he headed for 14 hours (with the assistance of the chief civil servants of the different ministries) the emergency provisional government of Spain while Prime Minister Adolfo Suárez's government was sequestered in the Congress of Deputies to prevent a power vacuum.

== Biography and career ==
Laína was born in La Carrera, Province of Ávila, Spain, on 18 May 1936. He graduated in Law and joined the General State Administration as a member of the General Technical Body in 1965 after passing the competitive examination.

In 1974 he was appointed civil governor and provincial head of the Movimiento Nacional in León. Laína held this position until 1976, when he was appointed civil governor of Las Palmas. Under his mandate, the armed Canary Islands Independence Movement was practically dismantled in that province in 1977. However, Laina was relieved in 1977 of his duties because of his disagreements with the mayor of Las Palmas, Fernando Ortiz Wiot, due to his authorization of the construction of state facilities on land that the city council had declared a green zone. Subsequently, he was appointed civil governor of the province of Zaragoza in July 1977, an office he held until 1980. This last mandate was characterized by continuous tensions with the pre-autonomous government of Aragón, because Laína was considered too conservative and because he did not facilitate the management of political parties and the regional government itself.

=== 23-F and head of the Provisional Government ===
The Council of Ministers appointed Laína on 13 June 1980 as Director of State Security, replacing Luis Alberto Salazar-Simpson at the proposal of the Minister of the Interior Juan José Rosón. Laína became the first non-military official to assume the most important position in national security, and had to coordinate for the first time all the security forces, as the Civil Guard was included for the first time under the same command.

On the afternoon of 23 February 1981, Laína was in his office, studying a report on the construction of the Police School in Ávila while also following on Cadena SER the retransmission of Leopoldo Calvo-Sotelo's investiture session. A few minutes after hearing the shots and shouts during the coup attempt, he received a call from King Juan Carlos I, who asked him what he knew about what was happening, to which Laína replied that he only knew what was being broadcast on the radio. He also added that he suspected that the person who assaulted the Congress of Deputies was Colonel Antonio Tejero, arrested three years earlier during Operation Galaxia.

That afternoon, several high-ranking officials proposed the creation of a civilian power between the military leadership and the King. Sabino Fernández Campo, then secretary of the monarch, after delivering it together with Juan Carlos I, approved this measure and the Technical Cabinet of the Ministry of the Interior summoned all the secretaries and undersecretaries of State, and other personalities such as the Governor of the Bank of Spain, José Ramón Álvarez Rendueles, to go to the ministry immediately.

The General Commission of Secretaries of State and Undersecretaries had just been convened and would be headed by Laína. This commission, at that time, had legal recognition but only had the function of preparing the ordinary sessions of the Council of Ministers. Therefore, when all those summoned arrived, they debated whether they would assume the role of "provisional government", the option supported by Laína, or not. They concluded that it was necessary to do so, and Laína sent Carlos Robles Piquer to draft an institutional declaration that would be made public to the media.

Shortly after nine o'clock in the evening, Laína appeared on Televisión Española, where he read the institutional declaration of the provisional government. In it he reported that "In these circumstances, the Secretaries of State and Undersecretaries of the various ministries have constituted themselves in permanent session, by instructions of His Majesty the King, to ensure the governance of the country, within civilian channels and in close contact with the Board of Chiefs of Staff, which is also in session".

At one o'clock in the morning, General Alfonso Armada, co-responsible for the coup, went to Laína's office demanding that he order the Civil Guard and the National Police Corps to join the uprising, Laína told him that "your behavior is disloyal because when I was in the University Militias I was taught that the boss must be followed until death, and your boss is the King. And what you have to do is obey the King".

Laína maintained direct contact with Juan Carlos I and Sabino Fernández throughout the night via a direct secure encrypted telephone line (which had only become operational that very same morning), during which he sent six communiqués to the 50 governors with precise orders to deal with what was happening. He also had three telephone calls with General Jaime Milans del Bosch, the other person responsible for the coup.

Laína had several discussions with the general director of RTVE Fernando Castedo, as he considered that it was a mistake for the national public television to continuously broadcast live reports of the coup d'état, as Laína felt that the antidote to that confusing and explosive situation was to do everything possible to calm the Spanish people and return as soon as possible to normality. He also ordered several arrests, including of Juan García Carrés, a far-right civilian member of the conspiracy.

The commission also discussed, after the King's delivery of his televised address condemning the coup and calling for unambiguous support for the legitimate democratic government, the liberation of the Congress. After the advice of the psychologist José Luis Pinillos Díaz, this did not happen and on the morning of 24 February the coup d'état failed and the deputies and the government were released, almost 20 hours after the assault.

Laína participated in the council of ministers that was held a few hours after the liberation of the government, and in the afternoon at the National Defence Board, at the request of Adolfo Suárez. The minister of defence Agustín Rodríguez Sahagún called to be part of the meeting on 25 February in which the arrest of General Armada was agreed upon.

According to historian and professor Alfonso Pinilla, the role of Laína and the provisional government was to "avoid a power vacuum and maintain a certain normality in the system. And Laína fulfilled that job brilliantly".

=== Later career ===
Laína obtained the support of the newly elected Prime Minister Calvo-Sotelo to continue as director of State Security and in April 1981 he managed to install the new National Police Academy in Ávila.

In March 1981 he was appointed vice-president of the single anti-terrorist command. In 1982 he replaced Juan José Rosón as Minister of the Interior for a few months when Rosón was operated on for a respiratory ailment in March 1982.

On 18 October 1982 he left UCD and refused to become involved in Suárez's new party Democratic and Social Centre. With the absolute victory of the PSOE in the 28 October 1982 general elections, Laína left office on 7 December 1982 and retired from politics.

== Death ==
Laína died on 7 January 2022, at the age of 85.

== Decorations and honors ==
- Grand Cross of Military Merit with white badge (1976)
- Medal of the Order of Constitutional Merit (2011)
