= 23-F: El día más difícil del Rey =

Spanish television mini-series (2009)

- Genre: Historical drama
- Written by: Helena Medina
- Directed by: Sílvia Quer
- Composer: Albert Garcia i Demestres
- Country of origin: Spain
- Original language: Spanish
- No. of episodes: 2

Production
- Executive producer: Pablo Usón
- Running time: 150 min.
- Production companies: Radiotelevisión Española; Televisió de Catalunya

Original release
- Network: La 1
- Release: 10 February – 12 February 2009
- Network: TV3
- Release: 19 February 2010

23-F: El día más difícil del Rey (transl. 23-F: The King's most difficult day), is a 2009 Spanish prime-time television historical two-episode mini-series. It dramatizes the events that occurred during the 1981 Spanish coup attempt on 23–24 February 1981. It was produced by Radiotelevisión Española (RTVE) and Televisió de Catalunya (TVC). It was first aired on 10–12 February 2009 on La 1 nationwide, and on 19 February 2010 on TV3 in Catalonia.

The mini-series received critical acclaim and numerous awards, including the National Television Award awarded by the Ministry of Culture and a Premio Ondas.

== Cast ==
- Lluís Homar as King Juan Carlos I
- Emilio Gutiérrez Caba as Sabino Fernández Campo
- Mónica López as Queen Sofía of Spain
- Manel Barceló as Antonio Tejero
- Jordi Dauder as José Gabeiras
- Jesús Ferrer as José Juste
- Juli Mira as Luis Torres Rojas
- Joaquín Gómez as José Luis Aramburu Topete
- Joan Massotkleiner as José Ignacio San Martín
- Alicia Pérez as Princess Irene of Greece
- Pep Munné as Francisco Laína
- Juan Luis Galiardo as Alfonso Armada
- José Sancho as Jaime Milans del Bosch
- Miguel Ángel Jenner as Luis Caruana
- Lluís Bou as Prince Felipe
- Haidée Fernández de Terán as Infanta Elena
- Anna Viñas as Infanta Cristina
- Albert Pérez as Fernando Castedo

== Production ==
The mini-series was produced by Alea Docs & Films for Radiotelevisión Española (RTVE) and Televisió de Catalunya (TVC). It was written by Helena Medina, and directed by Sílvia Quer.

== Episodes ==
The series premiered nationwide on 10 February 2009 in prime-time on La 1 of Televisión Española (TVE) with average of 6,491,000 viewers and 31.5% of share. The second and last episode was aired on 12 February with average of 6,920,000 viewers and 35.5% of share. The series was later aired on 19 February 2010 on TV3 in Catalonia dubbed into Catalan.

No.	Title	Original release date	Spain viewers (millions)	Share
1	"Episode 1"	10 February 2009	6,491	31.5%
2	"Episode 2"	12 February 2009	6,920	35.5%

== Accolades ==
Award	Category	Laureate	Result	R.
2nd National Television Award			Won	
2nd Gaudí Awards	Best Television Film		Won	
56th Premios Ondas	Innovation or television quality		Won	
12th ATV Awards	Best Television Film		Won	
12th ATV Awards	Best Series Actor	Lluís Homar	Won	
12th ATV Awards	Best Makeup and Characterization	Montse Buqueras and Sergio Pérez	Nominated	
