= 1985 Spanish coup attempt =

June 1985 coup d'état attempt in Spain

The 2 June 1985 coup d'état attempt was a conspiracy planned by a group of military personnel to overthrow the Spanish government. The coup, which did not come to pass, would have been carried out in A Coruña during the Armed Forces Day military parade. The plan was thwarted by the CESID before any action was taken. The administration of Felipe González chose not to pursue prosecution against the organizers.

== The plan ==
The conspiracy was allegedly backed by high-ranking military officers. The goal was to create a power vacuum that would facilitate the intervention of the army in Spanish politics, thus causing democratic backsliding.

To this end, they planned on assassinating Prime Minister of Spain Felipe González; Deputy Prime Minister Alfonso Guerra; Minister of Defense Narcís Serra; and the heads of the military high command, Admirals Ángel Liberal Lucini and Guillermo Salas Cardenal, and lieutenant generals José María Sáenz de Tejada and José Santos Peralba. The coup plotters also planned to kill King Juan Carlos I, Queen Sofía, and the Infantas Elena and Cristina.

These assassinations were to be carried out by detonating one or more bombs placed under the royal box during the Armed Forces Day military parade, which would be held on 2 June 1985 in the city of A Coruña. Also present at the event were the president of the Congress of Deputies, the president of the Senate, the president of the Constitutional Court, the president of the Supreme Court, and of the General Council of the Judiciary, as well as other members of the government of Felipe González.

The organizers involved in the plot had planned to rent a building with a basement next to the balcony where the targets would be seated and dig a tunnel in which they would place more than 100 kilos of powerful explosives. These would have been provided by an employee of a construction company, since the use of explosive material coming from the armed forces would have uncovered the military conspiracy. The group intended to frame ETA for the attack.

== The stifling ==
The attempt was aborted during Holy Week 1985 by the organizers themselves. However, no one was arrested or tried, and the matter remained hidden from public opinion for more than 15 years. The CESID made it known to the conspirators that they were under close surveillance, after which they decided to halt their plans.

Suspicious visits among the military members, some of whom were in prison, and the collaboration of one of the conspirators with intelligence services helped to detect and stop the coup.

== Consequences ==
None of the organizers, including those who were on active duty, were prosecuted. Sources within the first González administration claim that the conspirators were very few and that they were under surveillance and control, so they did not pose any risk. Likewise, they did not have the leadership capacity to lead the country in the event the coup would have been successful, and they did not have a plan to install a government.

The government decided to limit its course of action and conceal the matter rather than pursue action against the organizers. This decision was motivated by concerns about the fragile state of Spanish democracy. Spain was months from entering into the European Communities, and did not wish to jeopardize that alliance. In addition, the government did not want to provide the far right with more martyrs than those who were already in prison.

In 1997, Felipe González made a statement in which he revealed the attempted coup. To date, it is the last known military conspiracy in Spain.

== See also ==
- Premiership of Felipe González
- First government of Felipe González
- 1981 Spanish coup attempt
- 1982 Spanish coup attempt
- Operation Galaxia
- Spanish transition to democracy
