= 17 Hours =

- Theatrical release poster
- Directed by: Chema de la Peña
- Screenplay by: Joaquín Andújar
- Produced by: Ignacio Salazar-Simpson; Gonzalo Salazar-Simpson
- Starring: Paco Tous; Juan Diego; Fernando Cayo; Mariano Venancio; Ginés G. Millán
- Cinematography: David Azcano
- Edited by: Meco Paulogorrán
- Music by: Antonio Fernández
- Production companies: Wave Films AIE; Lazona Films
- Distributed by: Warner Bros. Pictures
- Release date: 23 February 2011
- Country: Spain
- Language: Spanish

17 Hours (Spanish: 23-F: La película) is a 2011 Spanish political thriller film directed by Chema de la Peña which stars Paco Tous, Juan Diego, Fernando Cayo, Mariano Venancio, and Ginés García Millán. It consists of a retelling of the 1981 coup d'état attempt in Spain.

== Plot ==
Taking place over the course of 17 hours, the plot consists of a reconstruction of the 23-February 1981 coup d'état attempt in Spain helmed by Antonio Tejero, Alfonso Armada, and Jaime Milans del Bosch. Similarly to other fiction works, the narrative underpins the interpretations of the events posed by Javier Cercas in The Anatomy of a Moment.

== Cast ==
- Paco Tous as Antonio Tejero
- Juan Diego as Alfonso Armada
- Fernando Cayo as Don Juan Carlos
- Mariano Venancio as Sabino Fernández Campo
- Ginés García Millán as Adolfo Suárez
- Lluís Marco as Jaime Milans del Bosch
- Joan Pera as Santiago Carrillo
- Jesús Castejón as Aramburu Topete
- Juan Calot as Leopoldo Calvo-Sotelo
- Manolo Solo as Fernando Castedo
- Luis Zahera as Jesús Muñecas
- Juanma Lara as Juan García Carrés
- Luis Callejo as Santiago Vecinos
- Jordi Bosch as Camilo Menéndez Tolosa
- Sebastián Haro as Landelino Lavilla
- Pedro Casablanc as Eduardo Fuentes
- José Manuel Seda as Felipe González
- Pepe Penabade as Manuel Fraga
- Paco Ochoa as Alfonso Guerra
- Aníbal Soto as Manuel Barriopedro

== Production ==
The film is a Lazona and Wave AIE production, and it had the participation of TVE, Telemadrid, and Canal+.

== Release ==
It was theatrically released on 23 February 2011.

== Reception ==
Mirito Torreiro of Fotogramas rated the film 1 out of 5 stars, singling out a good supporting cast as the best thing about the film, otherwise dragged by its stiffness, its fainting TV-movie looks, its flat mise-en-scène and its own obviousness.

Irene Crespo of Cinemanía rated the film 2 out of 5 stars, assessing that the film "does not contribute anything in historical matters, nor does it really delve into the psychology of any of the protagonists", also wondering what is the point in portraying Tejero almost as if he were a "crazy (good) man who is even pitiful by the end of the film".

Jordi Costa of El País considered that the film, "unable to get rid of its overdimensioned third-rate TV movie looks", features a background of "inattention, but also irresponsibility and a non-negligible degree of immaturity" on the part of its makers.

== Accolades ==
Year	Award	Category	Nominee(s)	Result	Ref.
2012	26th Goya Awards	Best Supporting Actor	Juan Diego	Nominated	
2012	21st Actors and Actresses Union Awards	Best Film Actor in a Minor Role	Ginés García Millán	Nominated	

== See also ==
- List of Spanish films of 2011
