= Paco Tous =

Spanish actor (born 1964)

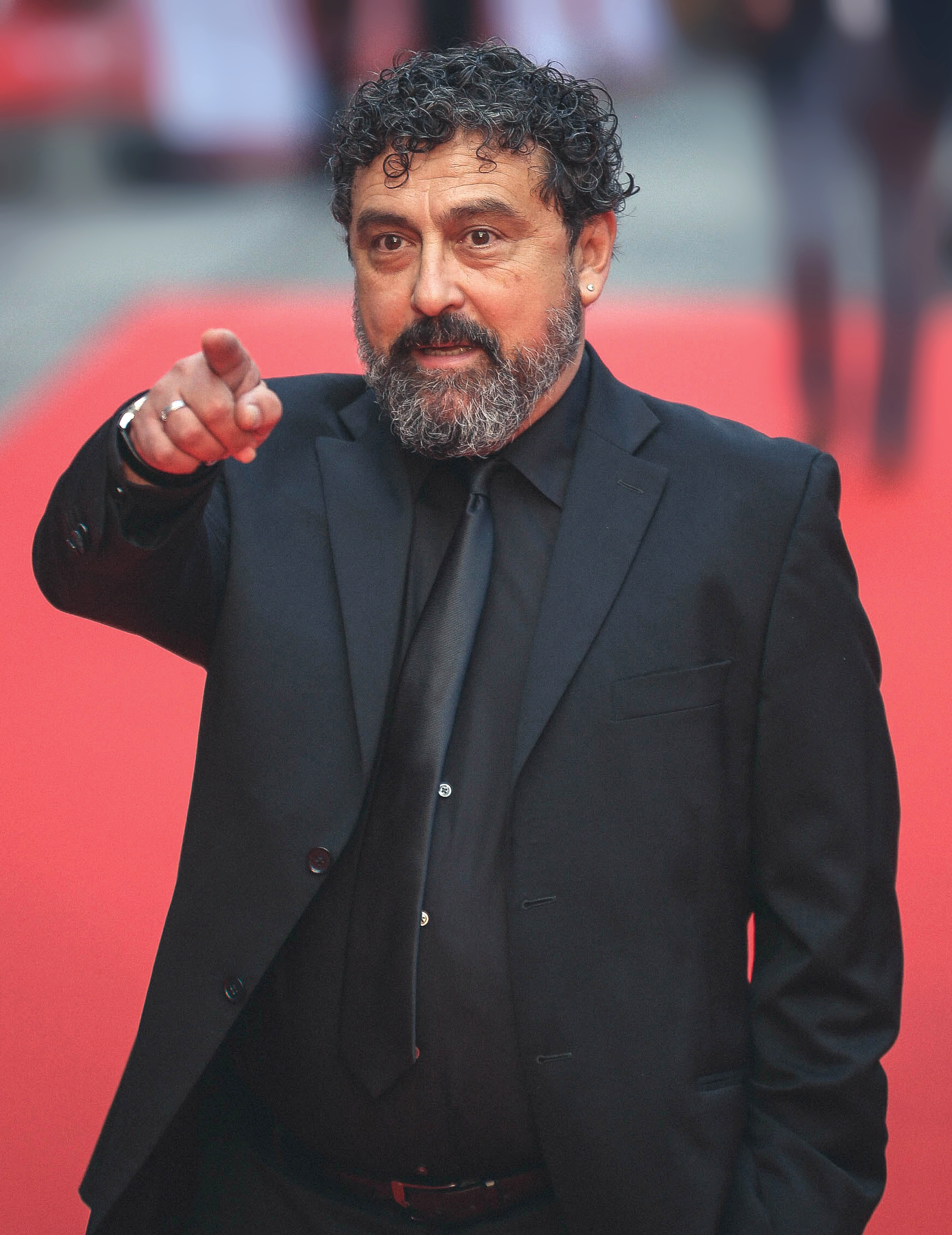
- Tous at the 2016 Seminci
- Born: Francisco Martínez Tous; 1 May 1964 (age 62); Seville, Spain
- Occupation: Actor
- Years active: 1987–present

Francisco Martínez Tous (born 1 May 1964), known professionally as Paco Tous, is a Spanish actor from Andalusia. He is best known for his television performances as Paco in Los hombres de Paco (2005–2010; 2021) and Moscow in Money Heist.

== Early life ==
Tous was born in Seville and was raised in El Puerto de Santa María (Province of Cádiz).

== Personal life ==
Tous is a member of the Brotherhood of the Virgin of Hope of Macarena.

He was awarded the Medal of Andalusia in 2018.

== Filmography ==
=== Film ===
Year	Title	Role	Notes
1987	Los invitados	—N/a	Uncredited
1987	Las dos orillas	—N/a	Uncredited
1999	Solas	Socio de Juan	
2004	Alacranes	Juan	Short film
2005	Straw Men	Ataúlfo	Short film
2005	15 días contigo	Funcionario 2	
2006	Alatriste	Maestre Fontaine	
2007	Paseo	Luciano	Short film
2008	Just Next Scretcher	Médico	Short film
2011	Fuga de cerebros 2	Paco Tous	Himself
2011	23-F: la película (17 Hours)	Antonio Tejero	
2013	Somos gente honrada	Suso	
2017	Lord, Give Me Patience	Padre Salcedo	
2019	The Legacy of the Bones	Dr. San Martín	
2020	Mentiras	Víctor Silva	
2020	Madres. Amor y vida	Gonzalo Carrasco	

=== Television ===
Year	Title	Role	Notes	Ref.
2005–2010; 2021	Los hombres de Paco	Paco Miranda	Lead role; 117 Episodes	
2006	El comisario	Méndez	Episode: "Fuego y plomo"	
2008	La familia Mata	—N/a	Episode: "¡Qué bello es ser un Mata!"	
2008	Martes de Carnaval	Teniente Rovirosa	Episode: "Los cuernos de Don Friolera"	
2008	Año 400	Tito	Episode: "El imperio se rompe"	
2012–2013	Con el culo al aire	Tino Colmenarejo	Lead role; 42 episodes	
2017	Perdóname, señor	Miguel Medina		
2017	Apaches	Alfredo Medina, "El Chatarrero"		
2017-2020	La casa de papel	Agustín "Moscú" Ramos	Main role	
2020-2021	30 Monedas	Jesús		
2023	Tú también lo harías	Manuel Navas		
2023	Mask Singer: Adivina quién canta	Himself / Rooster	Contestant	
2024-	Zorro	Bernardo		

== Accolades ==
Year	Award	Category	Work	Result	Ref.
2007	16th Actors and Actresses Union Awards	Best Television Actor in a Leading Role	Los hombres de Paco	Nominated	
2018	5th Feroz Awards	Best Supporting Actor in a TV Series	Money Heist	Nominated	
