= Juan Rovira Tarazona =

Spanish politician (1930–1990)

Minister of Health and Social Security
- In office 6 April 1979 – 9 September 1980
- Prime Minister: Adolfo Suárez
- Preceded by: Enrique Sánchez de León
- Succeeded by: Alberto Oliart

Personal details
- Born: Juan Rovira Tarazona; 5 May 1930 Lleida, Spain
- Died: 3 June 1990 (aged 60) Madrid, Spain
- Party: UCD
- Education: Complutense University of Madrid

Juan Rovira Tarazona (5 May 1930 – 3 June 1990) was a Spanish politician from the Union of the Democratic Centre (UCD) who served as Minister of Health and Social Security from April 1979 to September 1980.
