= 1982 Spanish coup attempt =

The 1982 coup d'état attempt was a Spanish conspiracy conceived by members of the military to overthrow the government that was meant to take place on 27 October 1982, the day before national elections. The plan was discovered and the planners were arrested on 2 October. The coup d'état plan hardly affected the October 28 elections, which was easily won by Spanish Socialist Workers' Party (PSOE).

== The plan ==
The plan, codenamed "MN", possibly in relation to the Movimiento Nacional, consisted of two parts, "Operación Halcon" (Operation Falcon) and "Operación Marte" (Operation Mars). The plans for the coup d'état were more precise than those of the 1981 Spanish coup attempt.

Operation Falcon was planned to start at 8 am with arrests of civilian and military leaders, then the takeover of certain government facilities including the Palace of Zarzuela, the Palace of Moncloa, and ministries culminating with the takeover of radio and TV stations by 10 am. The action was scheduled to be carried out on the event of a terrorist attack or if one did not happen, on 27 October, the eve of the general elections. A state of war would be declared and commandos would be positioned in three rings that would encircle Madrid, all the way out to the airport. Another part of the plan called for Jaime Milans del Bosch to be freed from prison to help lead. Operation Mars would take place shortly after throughout the rest of Spain.

Many news sources referred to the plan as "Operation Cervantes" after the author of Don Quixote but a Spanish newspaper reported there was no mention of that name in any of the papers.

== Dismantlement ==
On Sunday October 2, early in the morning, three suspects were arrested. They were Colonels Luis Muñoz Gutiérrez and Jesús Crespo Cuspinera, as well as his brother, Lieutenant Colonel José Crespo Cuspinera. According to government filings in court the 3 suspects were under surveillance when Muñoz Gutiérrez visited Milans del Bosch in prison and a briefcase with 504 pages of plans was later found in his car. At the same time several people convicted for their actions during the 1981 coup were moved to other prisons, notably the chief of that coup, Jaime Milans del Bosch to Seville. In November 1982, a fourth colonel, Lt. Col. Fernandez Hidalgo, was arrested in connection to the plot.

After appraising the situation, Minister of the Interior Juan José Rosón as well as Prime Minister Leopoldo Calvo-Sotelo, Minister of Defence Alberto Oliart and Manglano, director of the CESID, decided it was preferable to intervene in a quick way, without more investigations, to avoid a more complicated situation.

== Consequences ==
The four soldiers arrested were put on trial, but Javier Moscoso of the PSOE decried the investigation as not especially rigorous. In April 1984, a military court sentenced the first three men to 12 years and one day in military prison and dismissal from service each for conspiracy to rebel, and acquitted Lt. Col. Hidalgo. The court further asked the government to reduce the sentence of the men to 4 years in line with civilian law recommendations.

After the arrests Felipe González, leader of the PSOE, said, "There cannot be a single military person who can interpret the will of our nation" while his opponent in the election, Manuel Fraga of the People's Alliance said, "It's lamentable . . . a very sad piece of news."
