= National Television Award (Spain) =

Spanish television award

- Premio Nacional de Televisión
- Sponsored by: Ministry of Culture and Sport
- Country: Spain
- Reward: €30,000
- First award: 2009
- Website: http://www.culturaydeporte.gob.es/cultura/industriasculturales/premios/premio-nacional-de-television

The National Television Award (Spanish: Premio Nacional de Televisión) is one of Spain's annual National Awards awarded by the Ministry of Culture. Established in 2009, it recognizes and rewards the work of the entirety of an individual's professional life, or outstanding contributions in the television field. It is endowed with a monetary prize of 30,000 euros.

Candidates for the award are presented by the members of a jury, or by entities related to the television activities, through reasoned proposals addressed to the Ministry of Culture or to the jurors themselves.

== Laureates ==
Year	Image	Laureate	Beneficiary	Ref
2009		Cuéntame cómo pasó	Grupo Ganga Producciones, S.L.	
2010		23-F: El día más difícil del Rey	Alea Docs & Films, S.L.	
2010		Narciso Ibáñez Serrador		
2011		Televisión Española's News Service	Corporación RTVE	
2012		Jesús Hermida		
2013		Concha García Campoy		
2014		Isabel	Corporación RTVE	
2015		José Luis Balbín		
2016		El Hormiguero	7 y Acción, S.L.	
2017		Matías Prats		
2018		Victoria Prego		
2019		Imprescindibles	Corporación RTVE	
2020		Andreu Buenafuente		
2021		Karlos Arguiñano		
2022		Radio Televisión Canaria (RTVC)		
2023		Informe Semanal	Corporación RTVE	
2024		Paloma del Río		
2025		Jordi Hurtado		
2026		Rosa María Calaf		
