= Joaquín Milans del Bosch =

Spanish general

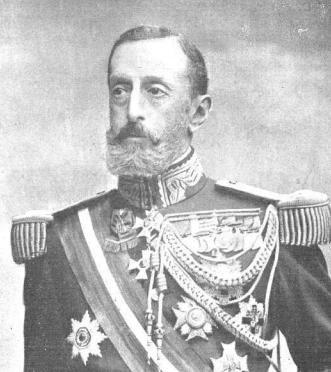
- Lieutenant General Milans del Bosch in 1916

Civil Governor of Barcelona
- In office 26 September 1924 – 18 February 1930
- Monarch: Alfonso XIII
- Prime Minister: Miguel Primo de Rivera
- Preceded by: Carlos de Lossada
- Succeeded by: Ignasi Despujol de Sabater

Captain General of Catalonia
- In office 30 September 1918 – 10 February 1920
- Preceded by: Ramón García y Menacho
- Succeeded by: Valeriano Weyler y Nicolau

Personal details
- Born: 6 June 1854 Barcelona, Catalonia, Spain
- Died: 31 August 1936 (aged 82) Chamberí, Madrid, Spain
- Relatives: Francisco Milans del Bosch; Jaime Milans del Bosch
- Awards: Grand Cross of the Order of Saint Hermenegild (1907); Grand Cross of the Order of Military Merit (1915); Grand Cross of the Order of Charles III (1919); Grand Cross of the Order of Civil Merit (1929)

Military service
- Allegiance: Kingdom of Spain
- Branch: Spanish Army, Army of Africa
- Service years: 1872–1930
- Rank: Lieutenant-general
- Wars: Third Carlist War (1893); Margallo War (1893–1894); Tagalog War (1897–1898)

Joaquín León Milans del Bosch y Carrió (6 June 1854 – 31 August 1936) was a Spanish military officer. The change in ideological orientation of the Milans del Bosch family was completed with his generation; traditionally, they had been liberal military officers, but during the twentieth century they aligned themselves with conservative forces.

== Biography ==
=== Early life ===
His father died when he was three years old. He was raised under the protection of his uncle, Lorenzo Milans del Bosch. He joined the cavalry army at a young age, lived through the Bourbon restoration and embraced the cause of Alfonso XII.

=== Military career ===
Milans del Bosch fought in the Third Carlist War in 1893, and in the Tagalog War in the Philippines from 1897 to 1898, where he coincided with the future dictator Miguel Primo de Rivera. Following the signing of the Pact of Biak-na-Bato, he returned to Spain where, after a few different military and diplomatic posts, he was named assistant to King Alfonso XIII, and raised to the palatial class of honorary royal servants of the Royal Household and Heritage of the Crown of Spain, the Gentlemen of the Bedchamber.

He was later posted to Madrid and Morocco, where he was elevated to the rank of lieutenant general.

=== Captain General of Catalonia ===
On 30 September 1918, Milans del Bosch was named Captain General of Catalonia. The situation in Catalonia was tense due to the economic crisis caused by the halt of exportations to belligerent countries and by risen prices. The workers' movement—led by the National Confederation of Labour—organized itself and fought the gunmen of the Employers' Association. Milans gave his support to the employers' association and used military methods to repress social conflicts in what is known as the Canadiense strike.

He felt he had the support of the upper classes of Catalan society and did not quit his post until King Alfonso, prodded by the Cortes Generales, directly ordered his resignation, which Milans tendered on 10 February 1920. During his tenure, he was invited to ceremonies and wedding banquets by the Barcelona aristocracy. King Alfonso—in compensation for Milan's obedience and years of service—named him head of the Casa Militar de la Casa Real.

=== Civil Governor of Barcelona ===
On 26 September 1924, three months after he left his post at the Casa Militar, Milans del Bosch was named Civil Governor of Barcelona by his friend, Prime Minister Miguel Primo de Rivera. Together with the minister of governance and the Captain General of Catalonia, he carried out a fierce anti-Catalanist campaign.

In 1925, he ordered the closure of FC Barcelona's stadium, Camp Nou, as well as closure of the Orfeó Català; he banned Catalan cultural organizations and suspended publication of Catalan newspapers and magazines. He was removed from office upon the fall of the dictatorship on 18 February 1930.

=== Later life and execution ===
From October 1927 to February 1930, Milans del Bosch was appointed to the National Advisory Assembly of Primo de Rivera's dictatorship.

Milans del Bosch chose not to leave Madrid after the attempted coup d'état of 18 July 1936 that started the Spanish Civil War, as his son Mariano had been detained – though he had the option to take refuge in the Turkish embassy. He was detained by militiamen on 30 August, and executed the following day on Fernando el Santo Street in Madrid's district of Chamberí.
