= Victoria Prego =

Spanish journalist (1948–2024)

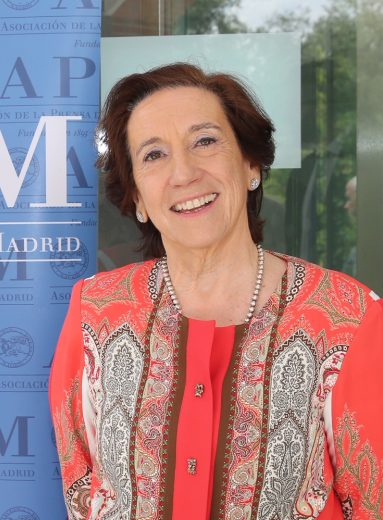
- Prego in 2019
- Born: Victoria Prego de Oliver y Tolivar; 11 November 1948; Madrid, Spain
- Died: 1 May 2024 (aged 75); Madrid, Spain

Victoria Prego de Oliver y Tolivar (11 November 1948 – 1 May 2024) was a Spanish journalist who was president of the Madrid Press Association between 2015 and 2019.

Victoria Prego was born on 11 November 1948 in Madrid and began her career at Televisión Española (TVE) in the international information section in 1974. By 1976, she headed the department. She moved to London in 1977 where she became the TVE correspondent.

After some time Victoria Prego returned to Spain. She began to gain popularity by presenting together with Joaquín Arozamena the third edition of the Telediario under the name Al cierre.

In 2018, the Spanish Ministry of Culture awarded her the National Television Award.

Prego died on 1 May 2024, at the age of 75.
