= 1981 Spanish coup attempt =

Failed coup attempt in Spain

1981 Spanish coup d'état attempt
- Part of the Spanish transition to democracy
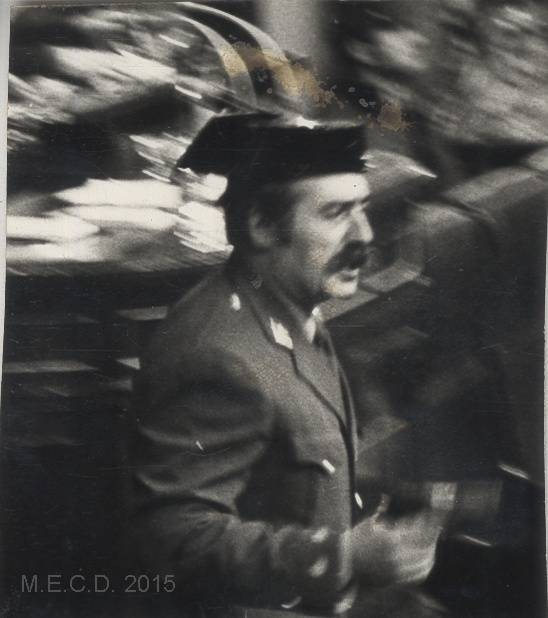
- Antonio Tejero bursting into the Plenary Chamber of the Congress of Deputies, gun in hand
Date	23–24 February 1981
Location	Madrid and Valencia, Spain
Result	Coup failed: Preservation of the constitutional order; Twelve members of the Spanish Armed Forces, seventeen Civil Guards, and one civilian sentenced to prison for military rebellion by the Superior Council of Military Justice; Successful investiture of Leopoldo Calvo Sotelo as Prime Minister of Spain; Consolidation of democratic rule in Spain

Belligerents
Kingdom of Spain; Civil Guard (main branch); Spanish Armed Forces (all branches except the Captaincy General of Valencia); National Police Corps; CESID; Supported by: (European Union) EEC	(Francoist Spain) Francoist rebels; Spanish Armed Forces (Captaincy General of Valencia); Civil Guard (rebels)

Commanders and leaders
(Spain) Juan Carlos I; (Spain) Adolfo Suárez; (Spain) Manuel Gutiérrez Mellado; (Spain) Sabino Fernández Campo; (Spain) Guillermo Quintana Lacaci; (Spain) José Gabeiras; (Spain) Landelino Lavilla; (Spain) Francisco Laína	(Francoist Spain) Antonio Tejero; (Francoist Spain) Jaime Milans del Bosch; (Francoist Spain) Alfonso Armada

Strength
All of the Spanish military and police corps except for the rebels	1,800 men (in Valencia); 200 Civil Guards (in Madrid); Dozens of tanks and other military vehicles

Casualties and losses
- Several visitors wounded (Note: The bullet holes in the ceiling can still be seen today.)

A coup d'état was attempted in Spain in February 1981 by right-wing, Francoist elements of the Civil Guard and the Spanish military. The failure of the coup marked the last serious attempt to revert Spain to a Francoist state and served to consolidate Spain's democratization process. King Juan Carlos I played a major role in foiling the coup, and the monarchy emerged with renewed legitimacy as a result.

The coup, which became known in Spain as 23F, (Note: Although, as can be seen in the references, the most widespread form is 23-F, and the Royal Spanish Academy (RAE)'s orthography accepts both the form with and without a hyphen as correct, the RAE recommends writing it 23F, as the hyphen is unnecessary.) began on 23 February 1981 when Lieutenant-Colonel Antonio Tejero, along with 200 armed Civil Guard officers, stormed the Congress of Deputies chamber in Madrid during a vote to swear in Leopoldo Calvo-Sotelo as President of the Government. The officers held the parliamentarians and ministers hostage for 18 hours, during which the King denounced the coup in a public television broadcast, calling for rule of law and the democratic government to continue. The royal address fatally undermined the coup, and the hostage-takers surrendered the next morning and all deputies were freed. A simultaneous coup attempt, executed by Captain General Jaime Milans del Bosch in Valencia, also failed. Tejero, Milans del Bosch and a third conspirator, General Alfonso Armada, were sentenced to thirty years in prison. In 1988 the Spanish Supreme Court suggested pardoning Alfonso Armada and Tejero; the government of Felipe González pardoned the former.

On 24 February 2026, following the 45th anniversary of the coup d’etat, the Spanish Government declassified confidential documents from the event.

== Background ==
The coup attempt was linked to the Spanish transition to democracy. Four factors generated tensions that the governing Democratic Center Union (UCD) coalition of conservative parties could not contain:

- almost 20% unemployment, capital flight, and 16% inflation, which were caused by an economic crisis
- difficulty devolving governance to Spanish regions
- increased violence by the Basque terrorist group ETA
- opposition to the fledgling democracy from within the Spanish Armed Forces

The first signs of unease in the army appeared in April 1977. Admiral Gabriel Pita da Veiga resigned as Minister of the Navy and formed the Superior Council of the Army. This was a result of Pita da Veiga's disagreement with the legalisation of the Communist Party of Spain (PCE) on 9 April 1977, following the Atocha massacre by neo-fascist terrorists. In November 1978, the Operation Galaxia military putsch was put down. Its leader, Lieutenant-Colonel Antonio Tejero, was sentenced to seven months in prison.

While seditious sentiments grew in sectors of the military and extreme right, the government faced a serious crisis at the beginning of the decade, and its position became increasingly untenable in the course of 1980. Key events saw the resignation of the Minister of Culture, Manuel Clavero on 15 January; the restructuring of the government on 3 May; the motion of no confidence against Adolfo Suárez moved by the Spanish Socialist Workers' Party (PSOE) between 28 May and 30 May; the resignation on 22 July of the vice-president, Fernando Abril Martorell, which produced a new reshuffle in September; and the election in October of Miguel Herrero y Rodríguez de Miñón, alternative candidate of the official bid for President of UCD.

The growing weakness of Suárez at the heart of his own party led to his televised resignation both as Prime Minister (officially "President of the Government") and President of UCD on 29 January 1981. On 1 February, the Almendros Collective published an openly insurgent article in the far-right newspaper El Alcázar, which was the mouthpiece of the Búnker hardliners, including Carlos Arias Navarro, Luis Carrero Blanco's successor as Prime Minister, and the leader of the francoist party Fuerza Nueva, Blas Piñar. From 2 to 4 February, King Juan Carlos I and Queen Sofía visited Guernica, where the provincial deputies of Basque separatist party Herri Batasuna received them with boos and hisses and various incidents. On 6 February, the chief engineer of the Lemoniz Nuclear Power Plant project, José María Ryan, was found murdered, having been kidnapped a few days earlier by ETA. Meanwhile, there was no further news about industrialist Luis Suñer after his abduction.

In this atmosphere of mounting tension, the process of choosing Suárez's successor began. Between 6 and 9 February, the 2nd UCD congress in Mallorca made it clear that the party was unravelling and Agustín Rodríguez Sahagún was named President of UCD. On 10 February, Leopoldo Calvo Sotelo was named candidate for Prime Minister.

== Political flashpoint ==
Tensions came to a head on 13 February, when news emerged of the torture and murder in Carabanchel of Joseba Arregi Izagirre, a member of ETA, who had been held incommunicado for ten days in the Directorate-General for Security (Dirección General de Seguridad). A general strike in the Basque region and an acrimonious debate between opposing parliamentary groups in the Congress followed. The government then dismissed various police chiefs, while in the Ministry of the Interior there were resignations in solidarity with the torturers. El Alcázar newspaper judged the government's actions a show of weakness that needed to be stopped.

Against this extraordinary backdrop, Calvo Sotelo presented his proposed government on 18 February, but, during congressional voting on 20 February, he failed to obtain the necessary majority approval for confirmation as Prime Minister, so a new vote was scheduled for 23 February: (Note: As established by Article 99.3 of the Spanish Constitution, since the vote failed in the first round on Friday 20 February, a second round was to be held forty-eight hours later, on 22 February. Because that day was a Sunday, the President of the Congress of Deputies, Landelino Lavilla, scheduled the second round for Monday 23 February.) the day the conspirators chose for their coup d'état. As planned, the coup would require Tejero, General Jaime Milans del Bosch, and General Alfonso Armada—a confidant of the King—as its principal instigators.

== Coup ==
=== Assault on the Congress of Deputies ===
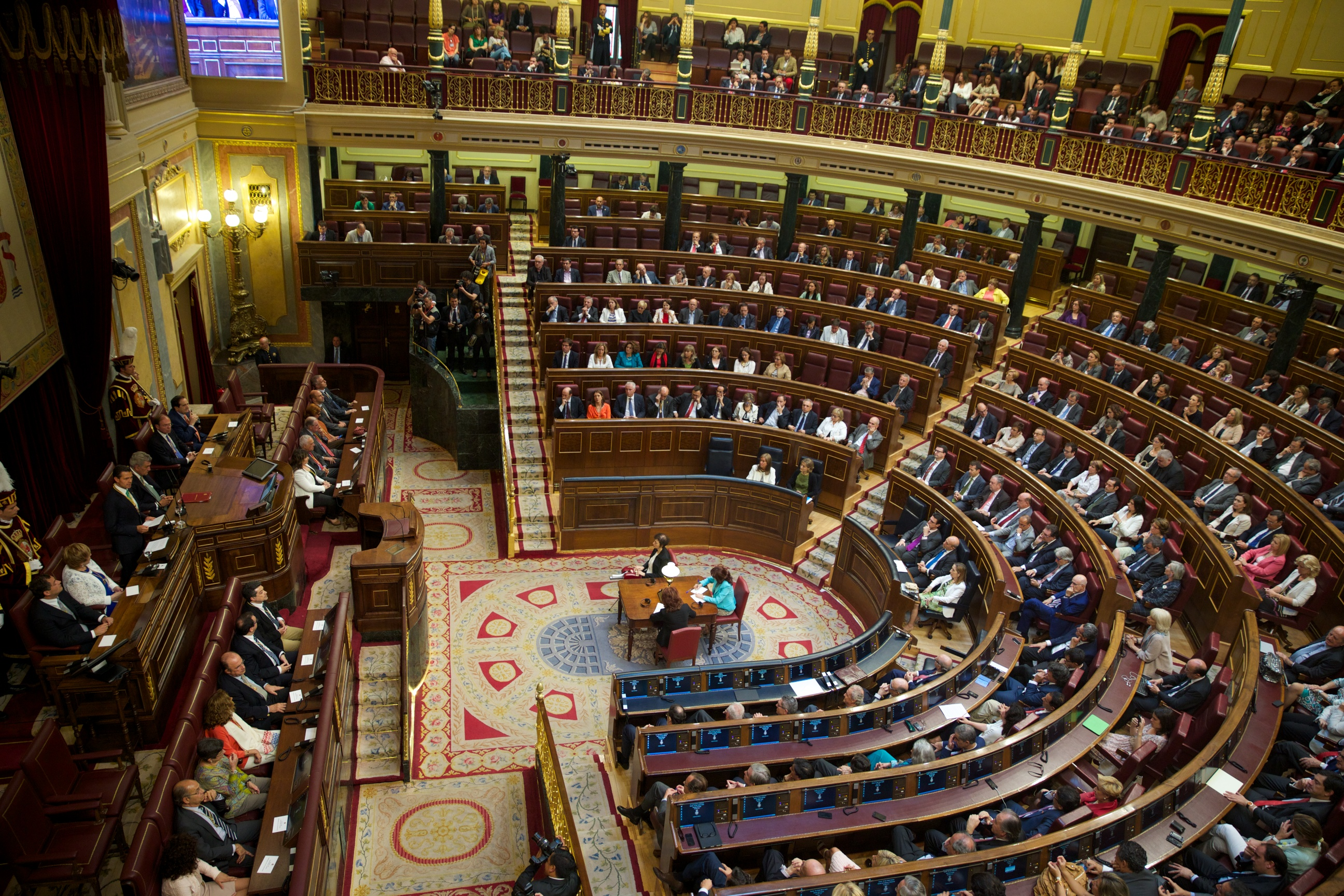
The Congress of Deputies Plenary Hall (pictured in 2014).

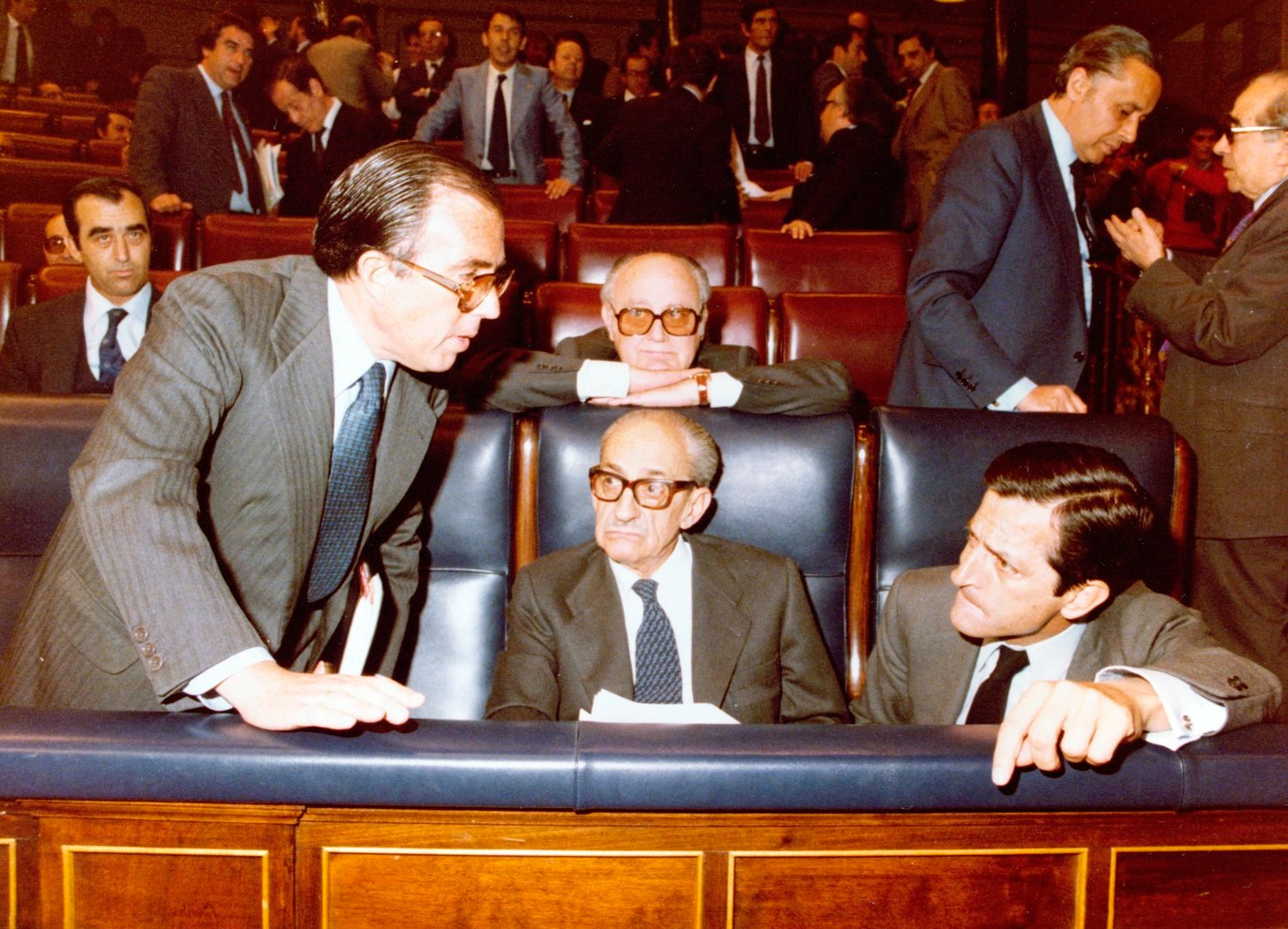
Adolfo Suárez (right) and Manuel Gutiérrez Mellado (center) in their seats in Congress (pictured in 1979), talking with Marcelino Oreja (left).

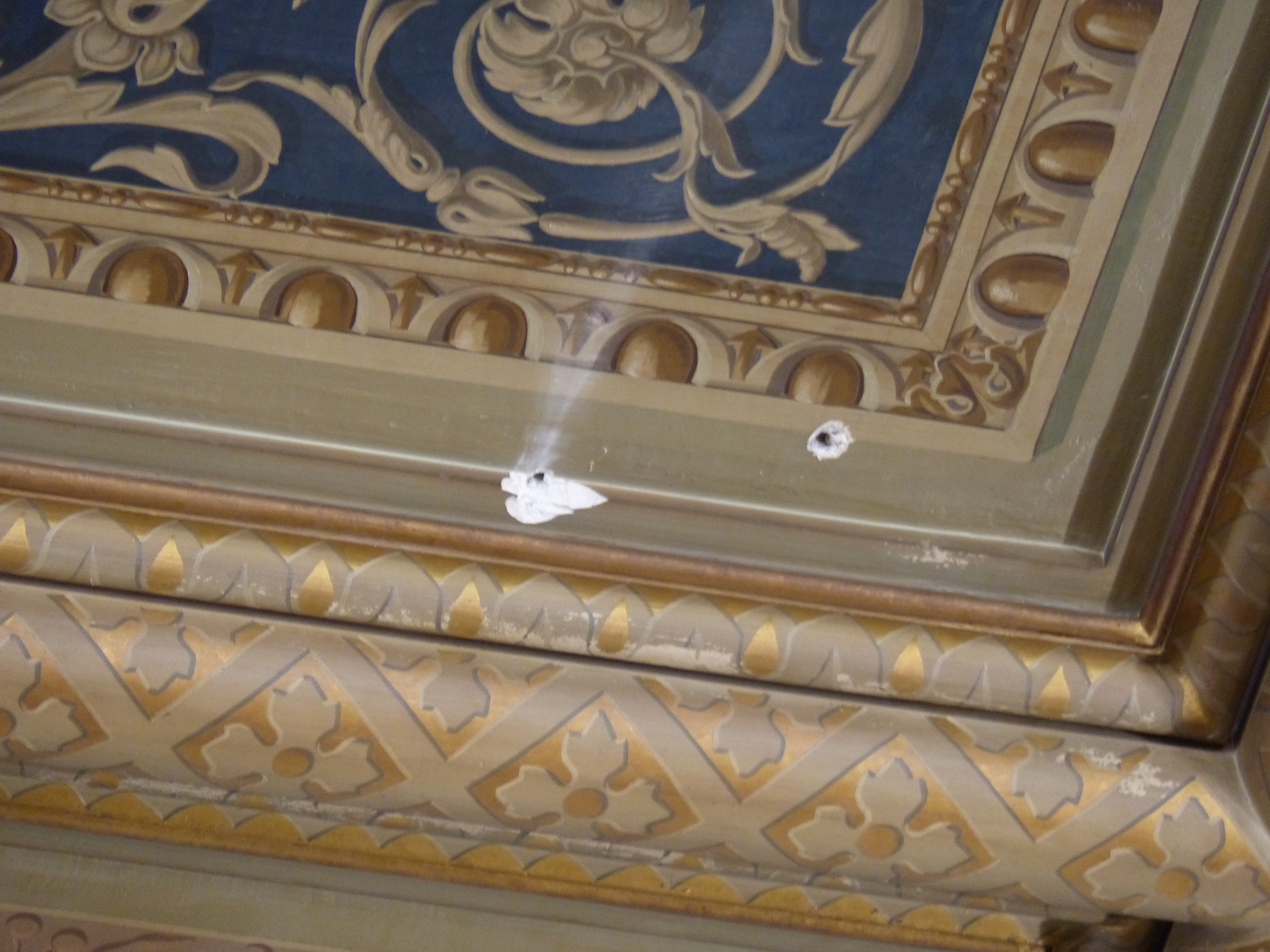
Bullet holes left on the ceiling (pictured in 2015).

On Monday 23 February 1981, at 18:00 CET (17:00 UTC), the second round of the roll-call vote for the investiture of Leopoldo Calvo-Sotelo as Prime Minister began at the Congress of Deputies plenary hall in the Palace of the Cortes in Madrid, with all deputies and members of the acting government present. At 18:23, as PSOE deputy Manuel Núñez Encabo was standing up to cast his vote, 200 Guardia Civil agents armed with submachine guns and led by Lieutenant-Colonel Antonio Tejero, burst into the congressional chamber. Tejero, gun in hand, immediately took the Speaker's platform and shouted "¡Quieto todo el mundo!" ("Everyone stay still!"), ordering everyone to lie down on the floor with "¡Al suelo todo el mundo!" ("Everyone on the floor!").

As the highest-ranking military official present, acting Deputy Prime Minister Army General Manuel Gutiérrez Mellado stood up and refused to comply, confronting Tejero and ordering him to stand down and hand over the weapon. Acting prime minister Adolfo Suárez made a move to join Gutiérrez Mellado, who briefly scuffled with several civil guards until Tejero fired a shot into the air, which was followed by a sustained burst of submachine-gun fire into the air from the assailants. All the deputies threw themselves to the floor, (Note: And, with the exception of the assailants, everyone present, including the members of the acting government seated in the front row, the visitors in the upper gallery, the journalists and photographers, and the stenographers and ushers of the chamber.) except for three: Suárez; Gutiérrez Mellado; and PCE leader Santiago Carrillo, who calmly lit a cigarette and remained seated. Undeterred, arms akimbo in defiance, 68-year-old Gutiérrez Mellado refused to sit down, even after Tejero attempted, unsuccessfully, to wrestle him to the floor. Their face-off ended with Tejero returning to the rostrum and Gutiérrez Mellado returning to his seat. The shots into the air wounded some of the visitors in the chamber's upper gallery and pierced the ceiling. (Note: The bullet holes in the ceiling can still be seen today, as they have been preserved as a reminder of the event.)

Immediately afterwards, Socialists' Party of Catalonia (PSC) deputy Anna Balletbò, who was four months pregnant with twins, was allowed to leave the chamber assisted by two of the rebels guards; and after confronting the rebels at the entrance, she was the first person allowed to leave the building. The first thing she did was call her family and the President of the Generalitat of Catalonia, Jordi Pujol, to ask for the King's telephone number. The King (Note: Who would later be godfather to Anna's twins.) asked her how many assailants there were and what their ranks were, she informed him that Tejero was possibly responsible, as her seatmate Julio Busquets, had told her while they were crouching down.

Televisión Española (TVE) was recording the investiture for later use of the footage. The assailants immediately disabled the television cameras by force, but a TVE operator, Pedro Francisco Martín, managed to continue transmitting from one of the four cameras without their noticing. TVE's headquarters, Prado del Rey, was receiving the transmission through an internal closed circuit and half an hour of the incident was recorded. Fernando Castedo, General Director of RTVE, hid the tape with the footage inside his chair's cushion and sat on it when some military rebels took Prado del Rey for more than one hour. (Note: The footage of the assault inside the Congress was not aired on TVE until all the deputies were released after the failure of the coup the following day.) However, members of the private radio station Cadena SER continued their live broadcast with open microphones from within the plenary hall, which meant that the general public was able to follow along by radio as events unfolded. As such, the date is sometimes remembered as "the Night of Transistor Radios" (La noche de los transistores).

Several minutes after the assault, everyone was allowed to sit in their seats at the congressional chamber with their hands visible, which caused the deputies to retake their assigned congressional seats with their hands resting on the seat in front of them. Guardia Civil Captain, Jesús Muñecas Aguilar, strode to the Speaker's platform to announce that everyone present were to wait for the arrival of "the competent military authority" who would determine what would happen; and that everyone could stay calm since nothing bad would happen.

At 19:35, Suárez stood up and asked to speak to the commanders. Shots were fired in response, and a guard flashed a submachine gun towards the deputies' seats, demanding silence. One of the assailants ordered, "Mr. Suárez, stay in your seat!". Suárez was about to reply when someone else shouted, "siéntate maldita sea" ("Sit down, damn it!"). (Note: Historically, this phrase is attributed to Lieutenant Colonel Tejero, although it was probably Lieutenant Ramos Rueda.) Finally, Tejero grabbed Suárez by the arm and led him forcefully to a room outside the chamber. When Suárez demanded that Tejero explain "this madness"; Tejero's only reply was "¡Todo por España!" ("Everything for Spain!"). When Suárez pressed the point, citing his authority as President of the Government, Tejero—using the informal "tú"—replied, "¡Tú ya no eres presidente de nada!" ("You are no longer the president of anything!").

Shortly afterward, five of the parliament's deputies were separated from the rest: Suárez; Carrillo; the opposition and PSOE leader, Felipe González, and his deputy, Alfonso Guerra; and the Minister of Defence, Agustín Rodríguez Sahagún. The insurgents' hope, in taking both the executive and legislative authorities prisoner, was to create a power vacuum that would force a new political order.

Almost at the same time, the Captain General of the III Military Region, Jaime Milans del Bosch, joined the coup with a revolt in Valencia, ordering tanks to be brought out onto the streets and declaring a general state of emergency in an attempt to convince other senior military figures to align with him in supporting the coup. Meanwhile, another insurgent, General Luis Torres Rojas, failed in his attempt to oust General José Juste from the Army's Armoured Division No. 1 "Brunete", resulting in Torres Rojas having to abandon his plan to take control of key strategic points in Madrid, including Prado del Rey—TVE and Radio Nacional de España (RNE) headquarters—and, therefore, firsthand control of the information as events unfolded.

At 21:00, the Director of National Security, Francisco Laína, published a statement on TVE which announced that, under the instructions of the King, a provisional government would be formed with the undersecretaries of different ministries in order to ensure State government in alliance with the Board of Joint Chiefs of Staff (Junta de Jefes del Estado Mayor) and led by himself. The command center for the forces deployed to end the occupation of Congress was set up in the office of the director of the Palace Hotel, right in front of the Palace of the Cortes.

The coup was vehemently condemned by member countries of the European Economic Community (EEC), especially since Spain was in preliminary negotiations for membership (eventually joining in 1986). Margaret Thatcher, Prime Minister of the UK, called the coup a "terrorist act." Alexander Haig, US Secretary of State, described the coup as an "internal affair".

=== Armada's soft coup ===
Originally, Armada, one of the coup's conspirators, had advocated a "milder" course of action, which he then proceeded to implement. As he tried to enter the Palace of Zarzuela, the royal residence, Armada offered the monarch a trade-off: the king would head a new "government of salvation" that would replace the democratically elected one in the hopes of appeasing Tejero and his forces and thereby avoiding a return to the full military dictatorship the conspirators were demanding.

The King, however, refused to receive Armada, who, shortly before midnight, entered the Congress of Deputies alleging that the King had ordered him to assume leadership of the government. As Armada was not the "competent military authority" that Tejero had been waiting for, the latter rejected Armada's claims with "My general, I didn't assault Congress for this" and, after that, ignored him.

=== Military occupation of Valencia ===
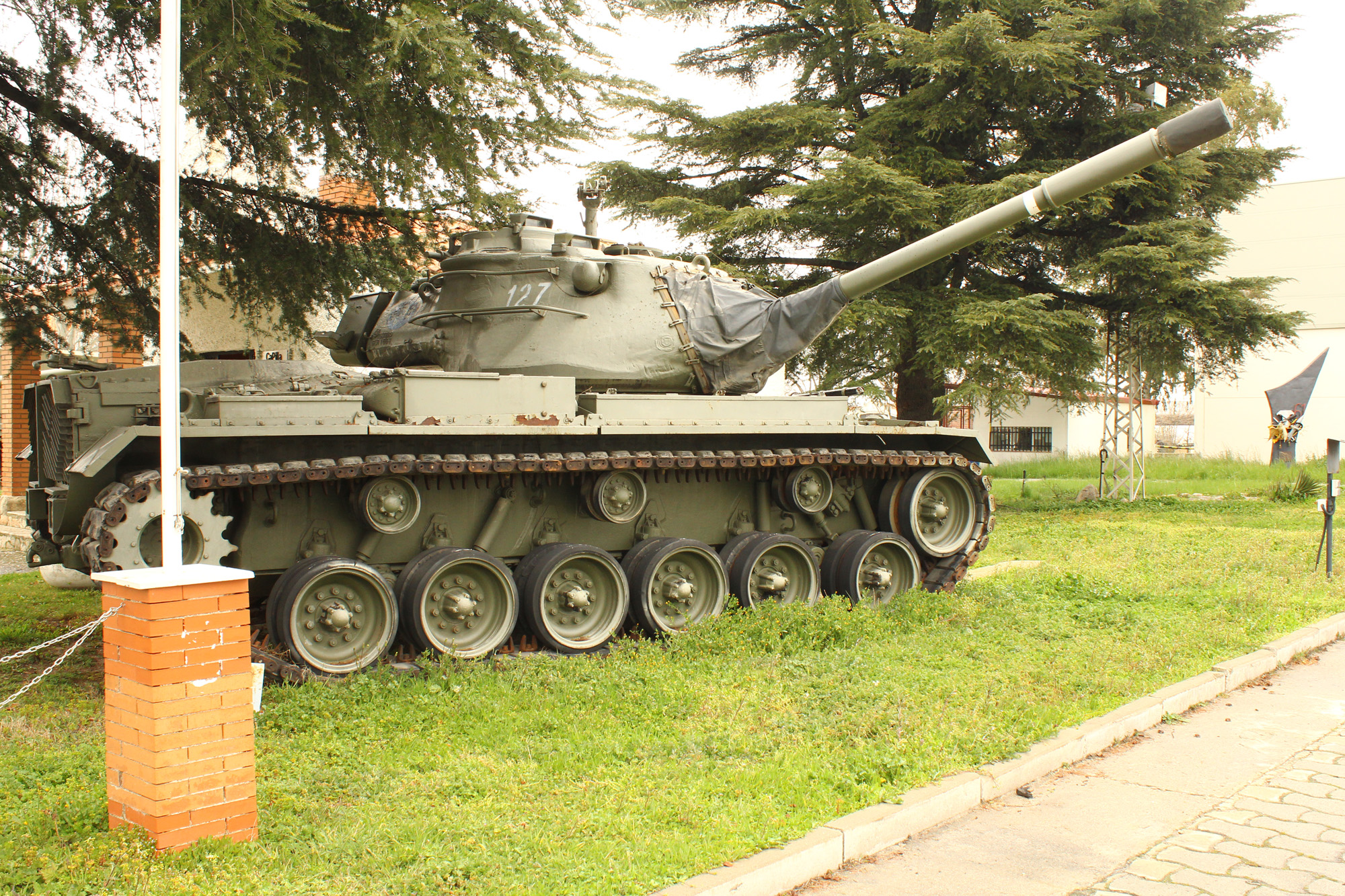
One of the Spanish Army's M47 Patton tanks that was ordered onto the streets of Valencia by Captain General Jaime Milans del Bosch.

Shortly after Tejero took control of the Congress, Jaime Milans del Bosch, Captain General of the III Military Region, executed his part of the coup in Valencia. Deploying 2,000 men and fifty tanks from his Motorized Division as well as troops from the port of Valencia onto the streets and into the city center, they occupied the City Hall and the Valencian regional parliament. The revolt, known as Operación Turia, was considered key if other military regions were to become involved in the coup. By 19:00, Valencian radio stations began broadcasting the state of emergency declared by Milans del Bosch, who was hoping to convince others to endorse his military action. Well into the night, Valencia was surrounded by armored military trucks and other troop units called in from the Bétera and Paterna army bases. Police snipers took their places on rooftops, military marches were played on loudspeakers and a curfew was imposed on the citizens. An armored convoy was dispatched to the Manises Air Base in order to convince the commander there to support the coup; however, the Colonel of the 11th Wing in charge of the base not only refused to comply, he threatened to deploy two fighter jets armed with air-to-ground missiles (which he claimed to have standing by with their engines running) against the tanks sent by Milans del Bosch, thereby forcing the latter to withdraw. This setback hinted at the impending failure of the Madrid coup.

=== King's repudiation ===
King Juan Carlos refused to endorse the coup. He, after protracted discussions with officials, was convinced of his military leaders' loyalty to himself and the Constitution. Two-and-a-half hours after the seizure, he phoned Jordi Pujol, and assured him that everything was under control. Pujol, just before 22:00, made a short speech via national broadcasting stations inside and outside of Spain calling for peace. Until 01:00 in the morning of 24 February, negotiations took place outside the Congress between the provisional government as well as General Armada, who would later be relieved of his duties under suspicion that he had participated in planning the coup.

As soon as the military rebels left Prado del Rey, Castedo sent two camera crews to the Palace of Zarzuela to record the king's speech repudiating the coup. The king, wearing the uniform of the Captain General of the Army (Capitán General de los Ejércitos), the highest rank in the Spanish Army, spoke to oppose the coup and its instigators, defend the Spanish Constitution, and disavow the authority of Milans del Bosch. He said:

In addressing all Spaniards, with brevity and conciseness, in the extraordinary circumstances we are currently experiencing, I ask everyone for the utmost serenity and confidence and I let you know that I have send the Captains General of the military regions, maritime zones and air regions the following order:

"Given the situation created by the events that took place in the Palace of Congress, and to avoid any possible confusion, I hereby confirm that I have ordered the Civil Authorities and the Board of Joint Chiefs of Staff to take any and all necessary measures to uphold constitutional order within the framework of current law. Should any measure of a military nature need to be taken, it must be approved by the Board of Joint Chiefs of Staff."

The Crown, symbol of the permanence and unity of the nation, cannot tolerate, in any degree whatsoever, the actions or behavior of anyone attempting to forcibly interrupt the democratic process that the Constitution voted on by the Spanish People determined in its day through referendum.

The two camera crews returned to Prado del Rey, each with a recording of the speech, in a different car and by a different route, escorted by the Royal Guard. The speech was broadcast on TVE and RNE as soon as it arrived, at 01:14 on 24 February.

From that moment on, the coup was understood to have failed. Deputy Javier Solana stated that when he saw Tejero reading a special edition of the El País newspaper brought in by General Sáenz de Santamaría, which vehemently condemned the hostage situation inside the Congress, he knew that the coup had failed. For his part, Milans del Bosch, alone and thereafter isolated, abandoned his plans at 5:00 that morning and was arrested. Scores of rebel guards clad in military fatigues jumped from a ground floor window of the building adjacent to the Palace of the Cortes trying to flee; others ran out the front door into the arms of officers who had surrounded the building through the night. The deputies were freed that morning after emerging one by one from their all night ordeal shouting "Long Live Freedom". Tejero resisted until midday on 24 February and was arrested outside the Congress building. Tejero subsequently claimed that Juan Carlos had known about the coup.

== Aftermath ==
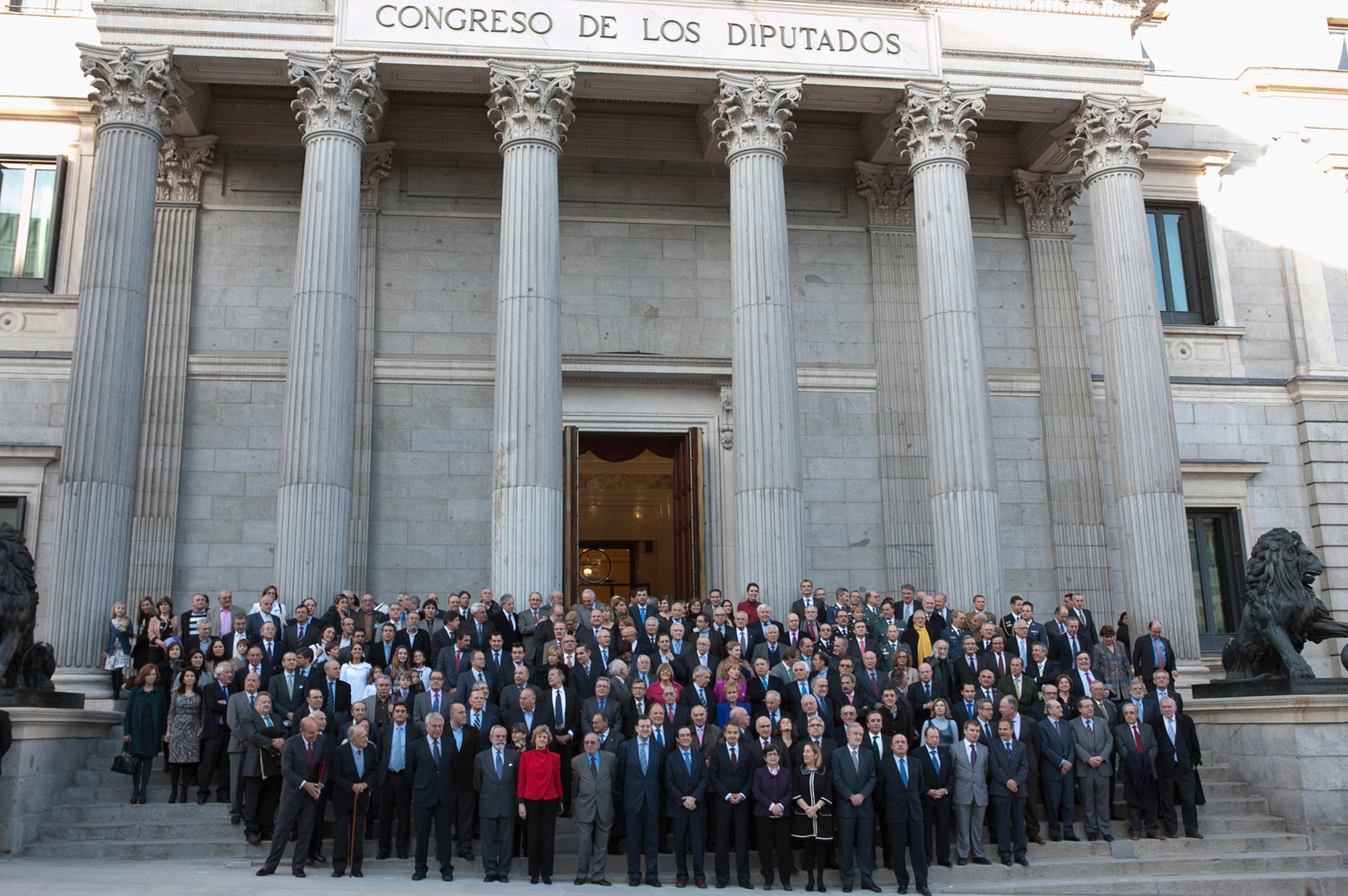
Parliamentary deputies and government officials who were taken hostage during the failed coup commemorate its 30th anniversary on 23 February 2011.

The most immediate consequence was that, as an institution, the monarchy emerged from the failed coup with overwhelming legitimacy in the eyes of the public and the political class. In the long term, the coup's failure could be considered the last serious attempt by adherents to Francoist ideology to establish any long-term authority in the country.

The Supreme Court of Military Justice, known as the Campamento trial (juicio de Campamento), sentenced Miláns del Bosch, Armada, and Tejero to thirty years in prison as the key instigators of the coup d'état. Eventually, thirty people out of some 300 accused would be convicted for their involvement in the coup. At that time, Spanish military law still included the death penalty for mutiny and treason but this was never applied.

Most of the lower rank and file (believed to have numbered around 4,000 military personnel – many of whom were doing their obligatory 2-year military service) who took active parts in the coup in Madrid and Valencia, were administratively discharged from the military soon afterwards.

The extent of any civilian involvement in planning the coup has never been thoroughly investigated. Juan García Carrés, ex-leader of the Sindicato Vertical (the only legal trade union organisation in Francoist Spain), was the only civilian to be convicted.

After the events, the PSOE opposition agreed to a law, the Ley Orgánica de Armonización del Proceso Autonómico (LOAPA), to slow down the establishment of autonomous communities as envisaged in the Constitution, to placate the military.

On 25 February 2026—45 years after the attempted coup—the Spanish government publicly released all the documentation about 23F which had still remained classified. That same day, Tejero's family announced he had died at the age of 93.

== In popular culture ==
In 2009, TVE made the event into a two-part television mini-series titled 23-F: El día más difícil del Rey. In 2011, it was made into a motion picture by Warner Bros. entitled 17 Hours. Episode 235 of the TVE series Cuéntame cómo pasó, titled "Larga noche de transitores y teléfonos" and aired on 10 January 2013 in the series' 14th season, featured a dramatization of the coup events and how they affected the series's protagonist family. The event was also written in 2009 as a novel by Javier Cercas that was titled The Anatomy of a Moment, which was turned in 2025 into a four-part television mini-series with the same name.

The event also appears as a background element in the plot of some fictional media. In the Spanish comedy films Los liantes (1981) and Todos al suelo (1982), both starring Fernando Esteso and Andres Pajares, there is a scene which takes place inside a church were the characters overhear a radio broadcasting the events taking place (including the gunshots) in the Congress during the attempted coup.

== Alternative theories ==
The coup has caused a plethora of unanswered questions as to its unfolding, the monarchist allegiance of two main conspirators (Armada and Milans del Bosch), and the King's lengthy absence before he finally made a late-night public television address have fueled skepticism and conspiracy theories during the Campamento trial and have remained active ever since.

These theories cast doubt on the sincerity of the King's defense of democracy and qualify the coup as an example of coercive realpolitik taken to the next level. In essence, this version of events alleges that the coup itself was orchestrated by the Spanish Secret Services in connivance with the King and the Royal House as well as representatives of the major political parties and mainstream media, among others. The plot's centerpiece and apparent motivation was the so-called Operation Armada, a "soft" coup modeled after Operation De Gaulle and aimed at a national-unity government headed by Armada himself, consisting of an array of ministers from all the main political parties. The first objective was to oust Prime Minister Suárez, who had been criticized relentlessly by the media and the political elite for months and was rumoured to have even lost the King's good graces, partly due to Suárez's ambitious reformist agenda which had, conceivably, gone off-script. The second objective of the purported "soft" coup was a consequence of the former: to hurry still-toddling Spanish public institutions into fulfilling the convergence criteria the nation was being groomed for, namely NATO and EEC membership and the consolidation of an effectively bipartisan and ideologically moderate parliamentary monarchy. According to the rationale behind the theory, this objective required both purging the armed forces of its most reactionary elements and frightening the common voter into accepting the monarchy and the two-party system as the institutional "default position".

Yet another and more concrete objective would have been to neutralize an imminent and "hard" coup d'état planned for later that year, most likely on 2 May. A major clique or sub-group among the instigators of this alleged coup was the so-called Colonels' group, headed by former Servicio Central de Documentación (SECED) chief José Ignacio San Martín. Two reasons have been cited why this alleged plot was considered particularly dangerous: San Martín's intelligence connections, and the fact that it was colonels and lieutenant colonels, rather than generals, who had direct control over the troops.

According to these theories, Prime Minister Suárez got wind of Operation Armada long in advance, hence his sudden resignation in order to avoid it—given that the coup was to occur during the motion of no confidence in his government, scheduled to take place some weeks later. The plan went forward in spite of Suárez's resignation, but Tejero's failure to understand its ramifications, his guileless belief that he was at the heart of a hardcore coup plot, the media field-day prompted by his violent entrance in congressional chambers (and his crass, uncouth demeanor and language, which was captured by microphones and cameras in the building and later ridiculed by the press), and his refusal to accept the multi-partisan government proposed by Armada, resulted in the simultaneous aborting of the "hard" and the "soft" coup plots by those who had planned them.

Former Centro Superior de Información de la Defensa (CESID) Special Operations chief José Luis Cortina Prieto, one of the three military officers acquitted during the trial, plays a ubiquitous role in these theories, some of which place him as a major power player within the conspiracy as well as the man responsible for coalescing all the different coup plots into one and later neutralizing them simultaneously. Cortina, who graduated from the Zaragoza Academy in the same cohort as the King, had been appointed to the Defence Staff intelligence services during the Carrero administration and would later assist his brother in creating the Gabinete de Orientación y Documentación S. A. (GODSA) think tank, which would be the germ of the country's main conservative party. It has been alleged that during a lunch break in the 23-F trial, and after being subjected to a particularly intense grilling session by the prosecutor, Cortina grabbed a phone and was heard saying: "Como siga este tío así, saco a relucir lo de Carrero" ("If this guy keeps pressing me like this, I'll spill the beans about [what happened to] Carrero"). The prosecutor's questioning allegedly lost a great deal of intensity when court resumed after the lunch break, and Cortina was finally acquitted.

Throughout the 18 or so hours that the crisis lasted, an enigmatic code word known as "El Elefante Blanco" (The White Elephant) was continuously mentioned amongst the plotters - particularly by Tejero. As to who or what this Elefante Blanco was has never been satisfactorily explained or even as to whether such an entity or party actually existed.

Arguably up until a 2014 mockumentary broadcast by laSexta, the work by Jesús Palacios and the book La gran desmemoria by Pilar Urbano, these theses were not part of mainstream consciousness, although innuendos and subtle implications were not unusual. Some of these implications may be involuntary. The King's authorized biography by José Luis de Vilallonga contains the following interview excerpt:

If I were to carry out an operation in the King's name but without his consent, my first move would have been to isolate him from the rest of the world and prevent him from communicating with anyone on the outside. Well far from it: That night I could have entered and left my residence at will; and concerning phone lines, I received more calls in a few hours than I had received in a whole month! From my father, who was in Estoril (and was also very surprised to be able to contact me by phone), from my two sisters in Madrid, and from friendly heads of State who encouraged me to resist.

Sabino Fernández Campo, chief of the Royal House, expunged this from the Spanish edition.

== See also ==
- 1982 Spanish coup d'état attempt
- 1985 Spanish coup attempt
- January 6 United States Capitol attack, an incident which has drawn comparisons from some to the 1981 Spanish coup attempt. Others, such as historian Stanley G. Payne, have rejected the comparison.
- List of attacks on legislatures
- Operación Galaxia, an earlier coup plan

== Sources ==
- This article draws heavily on the corresponding article in the Spanish-language Wikipedia, which was accessed in the version of 29 January 2006.
