= Queen Sofía of Spain =

Queen of Spain from 1975 to 2014

Sofía
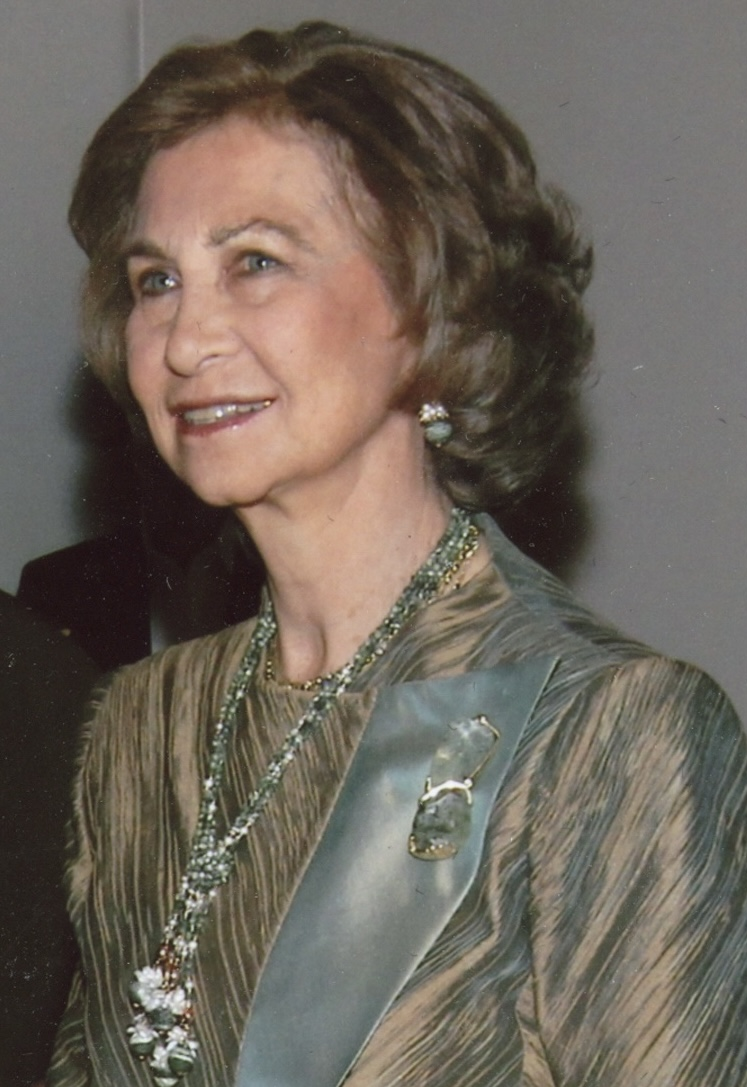
- Sofía in 2018

Queen consort of Spain
- Tenure: 22 November 1975 – 19 June 2014
- Born: 2 November 1938 (age 88); Psychiko Palace, Psychiko, Kingdom of Greece
- Spouse: Juan Carlos I (m. 1962)
- Issue: Infanta Elena, Duchess of Lugo; Infanta Cristina; Felipe VI
Names
- Sophia Margarita Victoria Frederica; Greek: Σοφία Μαργαρίτα Βικτωρία Φρειδερίκη, romanized: Sofía Margaríta Viktoría Freideríki
- House: Glücksburg
- Father: Paul of Greece
- Mother: Frederica of Hanover

Sofía (Sophia Margarita Victoria Frederica; Greek: Σοφία Μαργαρίτα Βικτωρία Φρειδερίκη, romanized: Sofía Margaríta Viktoría Freideríki; born 2 November 1938) is a member of the Spanish royal family who was Queen of Spain as the wife of King Juan Carlos I from 1975 until his abdication in 2014. She is the eldest and last surviving child of King Paul and Queen Frederica of Greece. She is also the last surviving grandchild of King Constantine I and Queen Sophia of Greece.

Sofía married then Infante Juan Carlos of Spain in 1962 and became queen of Spain upon her husband's accession in 1975. On 19 June 2014, Juan Carlos abdicated in favour of their son Felipe VI. Since her spouse's abdication, Doña Sofía has usually been referred to as reina emérita ('queen emerita') by the press.

Originally a member of the Greek royal family, Sofía was second in line to the Greek throne after her father, from her birth until her brother Constantine's birth in 1940.

The Museo Nacional Centro de Arte Reina Sofía (the Reina Sofia Museum National Center of Art), commonly known as the Reina Sofía, in Madrid that owns Picasso's Guernica and focuses on contemporary art, is named after her, along with the Reina Sofia Superior School of Music and the Reina Sofia Prize for Iberoamerican Poetry.

== Early life ==
Princess Sophia of Greece and Denmark was born on 2 November 1938, at Psychiko Palace in Psychiko, the eldest child of King Paul of Greece and Princess Frederica of Hanover. Sofía was named after her paternal grandmother Sophia of Prussia.

Sofía is a member of the Greek branch of the Schleswig-Holstein-Sonderburg-Glücksburg dynasty. Her younger siblings were Constantine II (1940–2023), who reigned as the last king of Greece from 1964 to 1973, and Princess Irene (1942–2026).

Her maternal grandmother, Princess Victoria Louise of Prussia, wrote in her 1965 memoir: "I have always had a particular fondness for her, and esteemed her modesty, understanding and goodness coupled with her candid realism touches with a fine sense of humour. There, she is very much like her father. My daughter told me what the little Sophia had once said to her about him: 'You know, Mama, I think we have the nicest Papa in the world.'"

As her family was forced into exile during the Second World War, she spent part of her childhood in Egypt, where she took her early education in El Nasr Girls' College in Alexandria, and South Africa, where her sister Irene was born. They returned to Greece in 1946. She finished her education at Schloss Salem boarding school in Southern Germany, and then studied childcare, music and archeology in Athens. She also studied at Fitzwilliam College, Cambridge, a constituent college of the University of Cambridge. She was a reserve member, when her brother Constantine, as helmsman, led Greece's gold medal-winning sailing team in the 1960 Summer Olympics.

== Marriage and family ==
Sofía first met her paternal third cousin and maternal third cousin once removed, the then Infante Juan Carlos of Spain, during a cruise in the Greek Islands in 1954. The two met again several years later at the wedding of Prince Edward, Duke of Kent, and Katharine Worsley at York Minster in June 1961, where their friendship developed into a courtship. Later that year, their engagement was announced by the Greek and Spanish royal families, attracting considerable international media attention as it symbolised the union of two of Europe's royal dynasties during a period when neither Greece nor Spain was governed by a reigning constitutional monarch.

Sofía and Juan Carlos were married on 14 May 1962 at the Cathedral of Saint Dionysius in Athens. The wedding celebrations included three ceremonies: Roman Catholic, Greek Orthodox and civil. The ceremonies were attended by representatives of most of Europe's reigning and formerly reigning royal houses, making it one of the largest royal gatherings in Europe since the Second World War. Before the wedding, Sofía renounced the Greek Orthodox faith and was received into the Roman Catholic Church, a decision widely regarded as necessary in view of Spain's overwhelmingly Catholic population and Juan Carlos's position as heir to the Spanish throne under the Franco regime. Following their marriage, the couple established their residence in Spain, where Juan Carlos continued his preparation for his future role as head of state under General Francisco Franco.

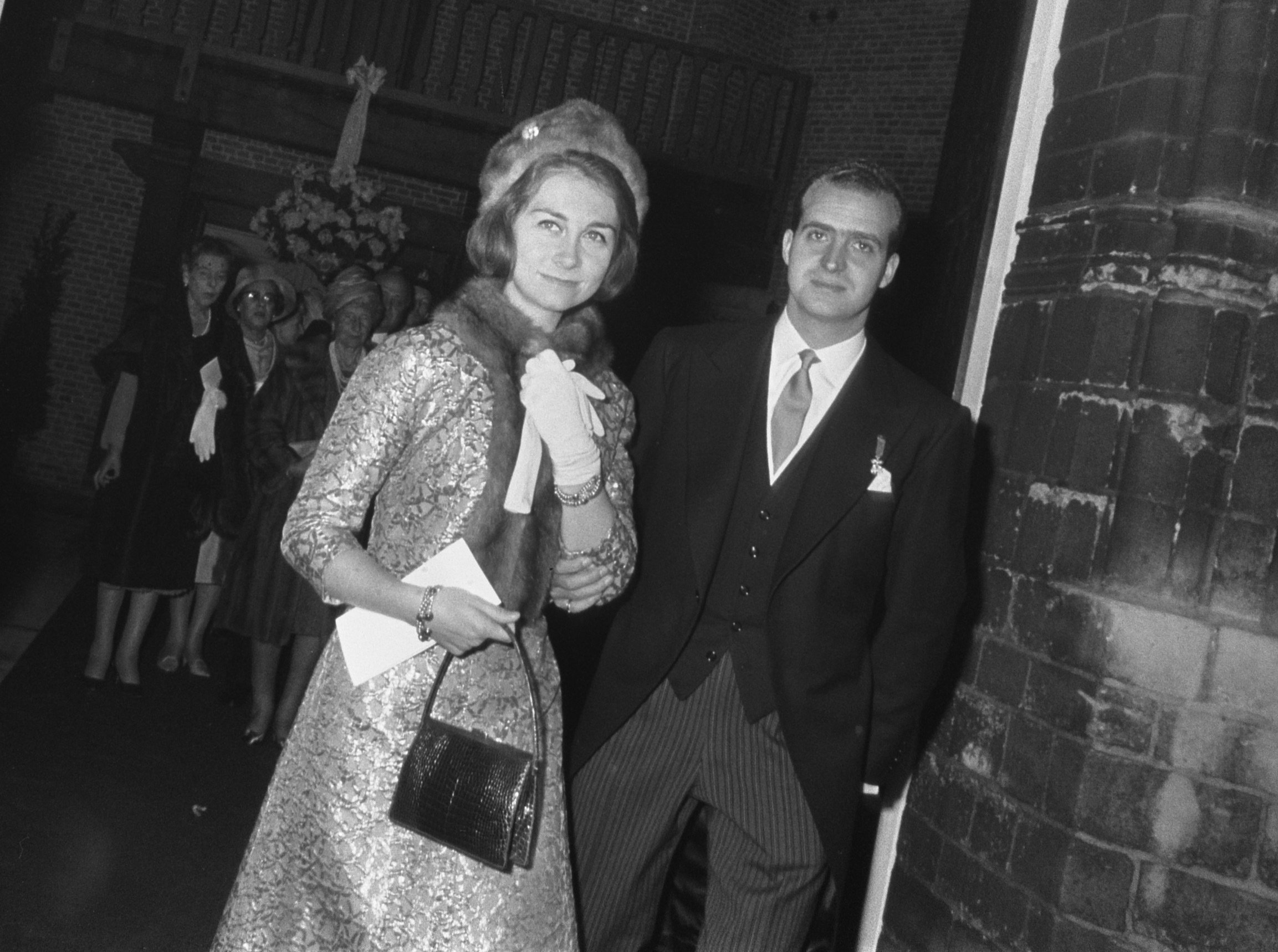
Sofía and Juan Carlos at the wedding of Prince Karl of Hesse and Countess Yvonne Szapáry von Muraszombath, Széchysziget und Szapár, The Hague, 1966

The couple has three children: Elena (born 20 December 1963); Cristina (born 13 June 1965); and Felipe (born 30 January 1968).

In 1969, Francisco Franco named Juan Carlos his successor under the official title "Prince of Spain". During the final years of the Franco regime, Sofía and Juan Carlos resided at the Zarzuela Palace with their three children. The family represented Spain at numerous state ceremonies and royal events abroad while preparing for Juan Carlos's eventual succession. Following Franco's death on 20 November 1975, Juan Carlos acceded to the Spanish throne as king two days later, with Sofía becoming Queen of Spain. The royal family subsequently returned to the Zarzuela Palace as the official residence of the Spanish monarch. During the early years of the reign, Queen Sofía played an active supporting role as Spain underwent its transition from dictatorship to parliamentary democracy, accompanying the King on official visits within Spain and abroad and helping to strengthen the monarchy's international standing.

Sofía was in Greece on a private visit to her brother, King Constantine II, when the military coup took place on 21 April 1967. The coup and the subsequent exile of the Greek royal family profoundly affected her immediate family. Following the abolition of the Greek monarchy in 1973, Sofía remained closely involved with her relatives despite residing permanently in Spain. Except for a brief visit to attend the funeral of her mother in 1981, she did not return to Greece until 1998.

Throughout her life, Sofía maintained especially close relationships with her younger sister, Princess Irene of Greece and Denmark, and her second cousin, Princess Tatiana Radziwiłł. In 1981, Irene made her home at the Zarzuela Palace, where she lived with Sofía for more than four decades and frequently accompanied her at official engagements and private family occasions. Tatiana Radziwiłł, who had known Sofía since childhood, was likewise one of her closest confidantes and remained a regular presence in her personal life. Following Tatiana's death in 2025 and Irene's death in 2026, Sofía lost two of the companions who had been closest to her throughout much of her adult life.

Although Sofía and Juan Carlos have remained legally married, their relationship has long been the subject of public attention. From the 1970s onwards, reports emerged of Juan Carlos's extramarital relationships, and following his abdication in 2014, numerous biographies and major news organisations described the couple as having lived largely separate personal lives for many years while continuing to fulfil certain official engagements together. Sofía nevertheless continued to support the institution of the monarchy and regularly represented the Crown at official, charitable and religious events during and after her husband's reign. During the scandals that affected Juan Carlos's public reputation in the 2010s and early 2020s, including the 2012 Botswana hunting trip and subsequent financial investigations, Sofía largely refrained from public comment and continued carrying out her official duties. Following Juan Carlos's departure from Spain in 2020, she remained at the Zarzuela Palace, where she continued to undertake public engagements as a member of the Spanish royal family.

== Queen consort ==
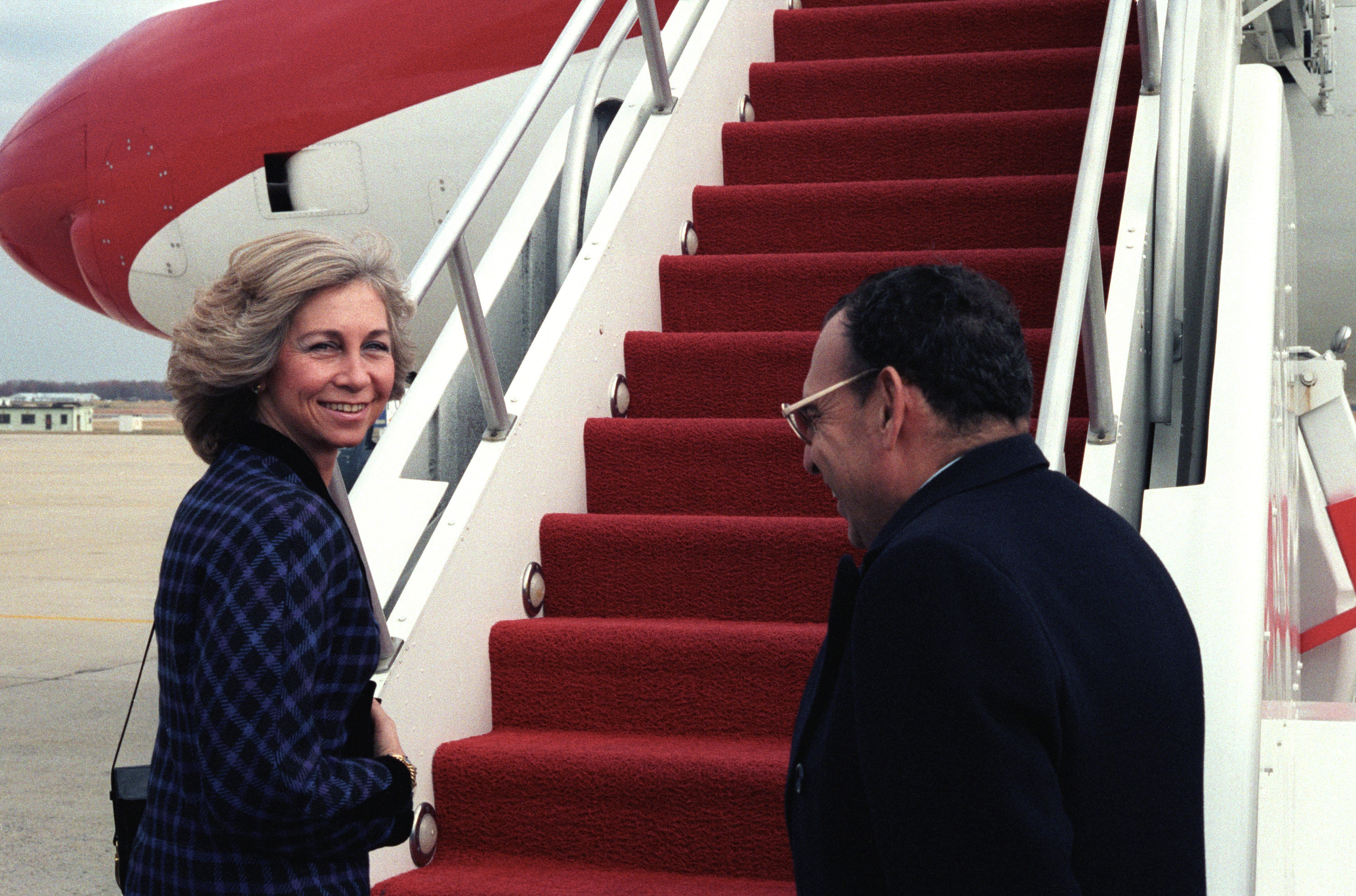
Sofía departing the United States in 1986

As Queen, Sofía continued to maintain close ties with the Greek royal family despite her official duties in Spain. During the 1970s, her mother and younger sister spent extended periods in Madras (now Chennai) where they pursued interests in Indian philosophy and spirituality. In 1974, Sofía and Juan Carlos paid an official visit to India, during which they met Prime Minister Indira Gandhi, reflecting the growing diplomatic relations between Spain and India.

Queen Frederica died in Madrid on 6 February 1981 following heart surgery, with Sofía remaining by her mother's side during her final illness. Sofía subsequently attended her mother's funeral in Greece before resuming her official duties in Spain. In January 1982, Sofía and Juan Carlos undertook another state visit to India, where they were received by Prime Minister Indira Gandhi in New Delhi as part of efforts to strengthen diplomatic and cultural relations between Spain and India. Sofía travelled to Madras, where she attended a book presentation by an Indian author, with her sister Irene.

Sofía is executive president of the Queen Sofía Foundation, which in 1993, sent funds for relief in Bosnia and Herzegovina, and is honorary president of the Royal Board on Education and Care of Handicapped Persons of Spain, as well as the Spanish Foundation for Aid for Drug Addicts. Additionally, she has served as the patroness of the Queen Sofía Spanish Institute since 2003.

Sofía takes special interest in programs against drug addiction, travelling to conferences in both Spain and abroad. The Museo Nacional Centro de Arte Reina Sofía is named after her, as is Reina Sofía Airport in Tenerife.

Sofía is an Honorary Member of the San Fernando Royal Academy of Fine Arts and of the Spanish Royal Academy of History. She has received honorary doctorates from the Universities of Rosario (Bogotá), Valladolid, Cambridge, Oxford, Georgetown, Évora, St. Mary's University (Texas), and New York.

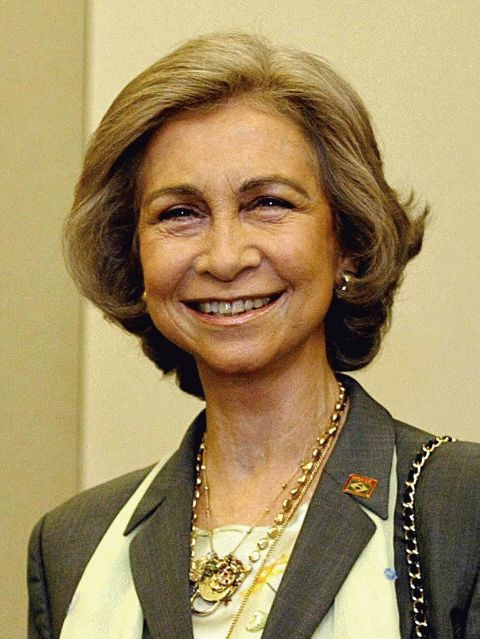
Queen Sofía in 2003

Sofía has been honorary president of the Spanish Unicef Committee since 1971. She has been working closely with Dr. Muhammad Yunus on his Grameen Bank, which offers microcredits to women across the world. Queen Sofía has travelled to Bangladesh, Chile, Colombia, El Salvador and Mexico to support the activities of the organization. Queen Sofía has also been a strong supporter of Somaly Mam's Agir pour les Femmes en Situation Précaire, an NGO combatting child prostitution and slavery in Cambodia. In 1998, Mam was awarded the prestigious Prince of Asturias Award for International Cooperation in the Queen's presence.

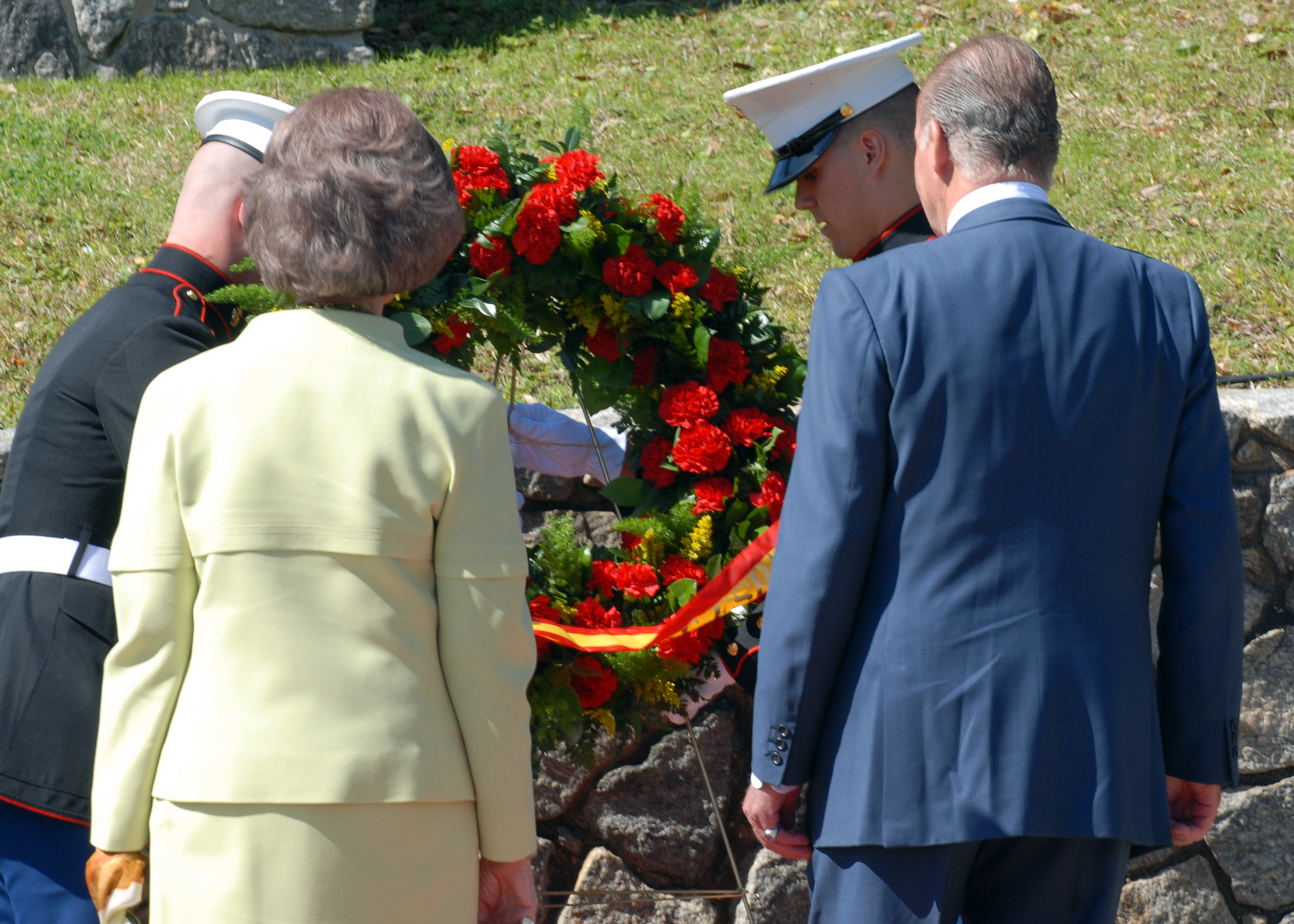
Juan Carlos and Sofía laying a wreath in Pensacola, Florida, 2009

As Queen, Sofía never publicly commented on political issues. However, in October 2008, Pilar Urbano's book La Reina muy de cerca ("The Queen up close") sparked strong controversy as it contained alleged statements by the Queen on issues debated in Spanish society. She criticized the military intervention in Afghanistan, where Spanish troops were taking part at the time, defended religious education in schools, and expressed her conviction that gender violence publicity would encourage new cases to occur. She also rejected abortion and euthanasia as well as same-sex marriage. The Royal Household commented that the book "puts in Her Majesty's mouth alleged claims that [...] do not correspond exactly to the opinions expressed by Her Majesty". While the two major parties - Socialists and People's Party - refused to comment, her opinions were subjected to heavy criticism by pro-republican parties such as the United Left and ERC, as well as LGBT activists.

In May 2012, Sofía was reportedly refused permission to attend the celebrations for the Diamond Jubilee of Elizabeth II by the Spanish government, citing tensions over fishing rights at Gibraltar.

In July 2012, Sofía visited the Philippines for a fourth time. She inspected several development projects around the former Spanish colony that her country's government is funding via the Agencia Española de Cooperacion Internacional para el Desarollo (AECID). She visited the National Library, National Museum and the Pontifical and Royal University of Santo Tomas, The Catholic University of the Philippines, which had the oldest extant university charter in Asia and housed the world's largest collection of suyat scripts. She also met with Spanish nationals residing in the Philippines, and attended a reception at the Spanish Embassy. She also attended a state dinner in her honour at Malacañan Palace hosted by President Benigno Aquino III, and thanked the president for promoting the Spanish language in the Philippine educational system.

== Queen emerita ==
Following her husband's abdication as King in 2014, Sofía has focused on her sponsoring activities, spending her time between La Zarzuela and, in the summer months, the Marivent Palace in Palma de Mallorca. She regularly accompanies her son and his family at events.

In September 2025, Sofía opened the "Spain and the Birth of American Democracy: A History Symposium", cohosted by the Queen Sofía Spanish Institute and the Daughters of the American Revolution at DAR Constitution Hall in Washington, D.C. The symposium, held in celebration of the upcoming United States Semiquincentennial, recognized Spain's role in the American Revolutionary War and the cause for American Independence from the British Empire. Sofía was received at DAR Constitution Hall by DAR President General Ginnie Sebastian Storage. She also visited the Spanish Embassy in the United States, where she was received by Ambassador Ángeles Moreno Bau and met with María Isabel Valldecabres, president and general director of the National Mint and Stamp Factory, and Pilar Lladó Arburúa, the chair of the board of directors of the Queen Sofía Spanish Institute. While there, Sofía chaired the meeting of the executive committee of the Queen Sofía Spanish Institute's board of trustees.

== Honours ==
Royal monogram

Queen Sofía was awarded the Order of the Queen of Sheba by Emperor Haile Selassie of Ethiopia in 1973 during her and her husband Juan Carlos's visit to the capital Addis Ababa. Sofía was appointed as a Knight Grand Cross of the Order of Carlos III on 10 May 1962 and a Dame Grand Cross of the Order of Queen Maria Luisa on 14 May 1962. The Queen of Spain was elevated to Grand Cross with Collar of the Order of Charles III on 31 October 1983. Since then, Queen Sofía has received different honours and decorations by more than 40 foreign states. In 2024, Queen Sofía was created as a Knight of the Order of the Golden Fleece.

=== Arms ===
Coat of arms of Queen Sofía of Spain
Notes The Queen's coat of arms has no official status. In Spain, only the coats of arms of the King and the Prince of Asturias are official Crest The Spanish Royal Crown (Crown's arches differenced as consort) Escutcheon Impaled, I quarterly, 1st Gules a castle Or, triple-embattled and voided gate and windows, with three towers each triple-turreted, of the field, masoned Sable and ajoure Azure (Castile); 2nd Argent a lion rampant Gules crowned, langued and armed Or (Leon); 3rd Or, four pallets Gules (Crown of Aragon) and 4th Gules a cross, saltire and orle of chains linked together Or, a centre point Vert Argent (Navarre); enté en point, with a pomegranate proper seeded Gules, supported, sculpted and leafed in two leaves Vert (Granada); inescutcheon Azure bordure Gules, three fleurs-de-lys Or (Bourbon-Anjou); II, Azure, a cross argent (Greece); Inescutcheon, quarterly by a cross Argent fimbriated Gules, the Cross of the Order of the Dannebrog, 1st Or, three lions in pale passant Azure, crowned Or, langued and armed Gules and nine hearts Gules (Denmark); 2nd Or, two lions in pale passant Azure, langued and armed Gules (Schleswig); 3rd Azure, party per fess, in chief three crowns Or (the former Kalmar Union), per pale, in dexter base, Gules, a stockfish Argent crowned Or (Iceland ancient), in sinister base, Azure, party per pale, a) a ram passant Argent armed and unguled Or (the Faroe Islands), b) a polar bear rampant Argent (Greenland); 4th party per fess, the chief, Or, in gold, nine hearts Gules arranged 4, 3, 2 beneath a lion passant Azure, langued and armed Gules (King of the Goths), the lower half, Gules, a crowned lindorm Or (King of the Wends); overall an escutcheon Gules quarterly, 1st a nettle leaf Argent with an indented bordure Gules (Holstein), 2nd a swan Argent gorged with a crown Or (Stormarn), 3rd a knight dressed in armor Or on a horse Argent and an oval shield Azure with a cross Or on his arm (Dithmarschen), 4th a horse's head Or (Lauenburg) overall another escutcheon party per pale, in dexter Or, two bars Gules (Oldenburg), in sinister Azure, a cross Or (Delmenhorst). Orders The collar of the Order of the Golden Fleece. Banner The Queen's personal Royal Standard is that of her husband (a dark blue square flag) bordered with the colors of the former royal standard of Greece (a white cross on a blue field), which was used by her father, and charged with her personalized coat of arms. Symbolism The personal coat of arms of the Queen impales the Spanish Royal Arms (her husband's shield) to the dexter (viewer's left) with her father's shield, the arms of King Paul of Greece – the arms of Greece with an inescutcheon which bears the coat of arms of Denmark (1819–1903 version) as used when George I became king of Greece in the 1860s and showing the dynastic link to the Schleswig-Holstein-Sonderburg-Glücksburg dynasty; a shield containing a cross from the Order of the Dannebrog and subcoats representing Denmark, Schleswig, the former Kalmar Union, Iceland, the Faroe Islands, Greenland, Holstein, Stormarn, Dithmarschen, Lauenburg, Oldenburg, Delmenhorst, and the former Danish royal titles of King of the Wends and Goths.

== In popular culture ==
Queen Sofía is portrayed on screen by Mónica López in the Televisión Española mini-series 23-F: El día más difícil del Rey (2009); by Marisa Paredes in the Telecinco mini-series Felipe y Letizia (2010); by Nadia de Santiago in the Antena 3 mini-series Sofía (2011); by Olga Lozano in the film 17 Hours (2011); by Cristina Brondo in the Telecinco mini-series El Rey (2014); by Salomé Jiménez in the Atresmedia mini-series Untameable (2023); and by Elena Petrova in the Movistar Plus+ mini-series The Anatomy of a Moment (2025).

== Notable published works ==
- En Decelia: fragmentos cerámicos de Decelia y miscelánea arqueológica. Athens, (1959–1960). Edited in Spanish in Spain, 2013. ISBN 9788494103308

== See also ==
- Descendants of Christian IX of Denmark - Lists other members of European royalty who share a common ancestor with Queen Sofía of Spain
- Joyas de pasar

Queen Sofía of Spain House of Schleswig-Holstein-Sonderburg-Glücksburg Cadet branch of the House of Oldenburg Born: 2 November 1938
Spanish royalty
Vacant Title last held by Victoria Eugenie of Battenberg	Queen consort of Spain; 22 November 1975 – 18 June 2014	Succeeded by Letizia Ortiz Rocasolano
