= Francisco Milans del Bosch =

Spanish army officer

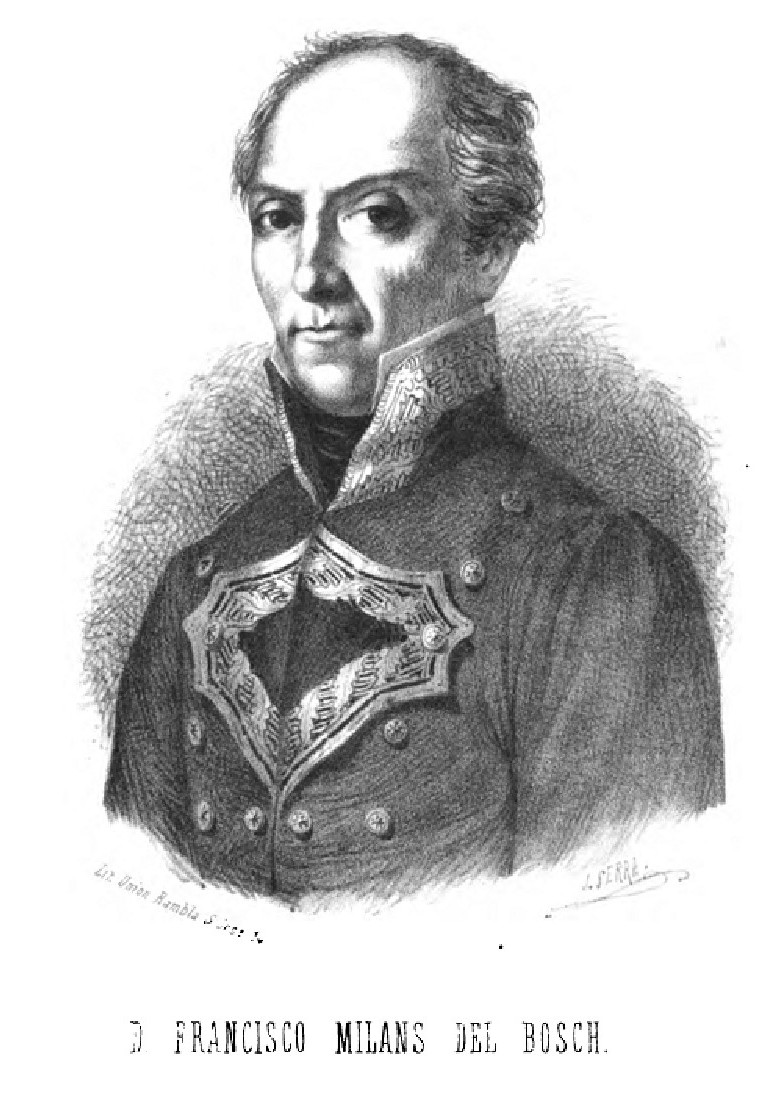
- Born: 1769; Sant Vicenç de Montalt, Spain
- Died: 1834 (aged 64–65) Sant Vicenç de Montalt, Spain
- Allegiance: Spain
- Branch: Spanish Army
- Wars: War of the Pyrenees; Peninsular War

Francisco Milans del Bosch (1769–1834) was a Spanish general.

== Early career ==
Having entered the Spanish army as a cadet, in February 1793 he became an alférez and participated in the War of the Pyrenees under general Antonio Ricardos, against the French. He became a lieutenant alférez in May 1794 and was wounded at the Battle of the Black Mountain the following November. He was promoted to lieutenant in 1796.

== Peninsular War ==
Later, Milans del Bosch participated in the Peninsular War of 1807–1814, commanding irregular Catalan and Valencian mountain light troops—the Migueletes—in Catalonia. After Iberia's independence and the return of an absolute monarchy under Ferdinand VII, Milans del Bosch sided with the liberals.

== Pronunciamento ==
In 1817, Milans del Bosch and General Luis de Lacy organized a pronunciamento (which differs from the coup d'êtat because of its open declaration of opposition to an incumbent government). Lacy was promptly arrested and sentenced to death, forcing Milans del Bosch to flee. He made several subsequent attempts at ousting the Spanish government from his hideout in the Pyrénées-Orientales, before being arrested by French authorities in Laroque-des-Albères on 3 June 1829, near the Spanish border.

Milans del Bosch launched a final, failed rebellion in Empordà in 1830.

Milans del Bosch's grandson, Joaquín Milans del Bosch, became a high-ranking officer in the Spanish Army.
