= La Carrera =

- municipality
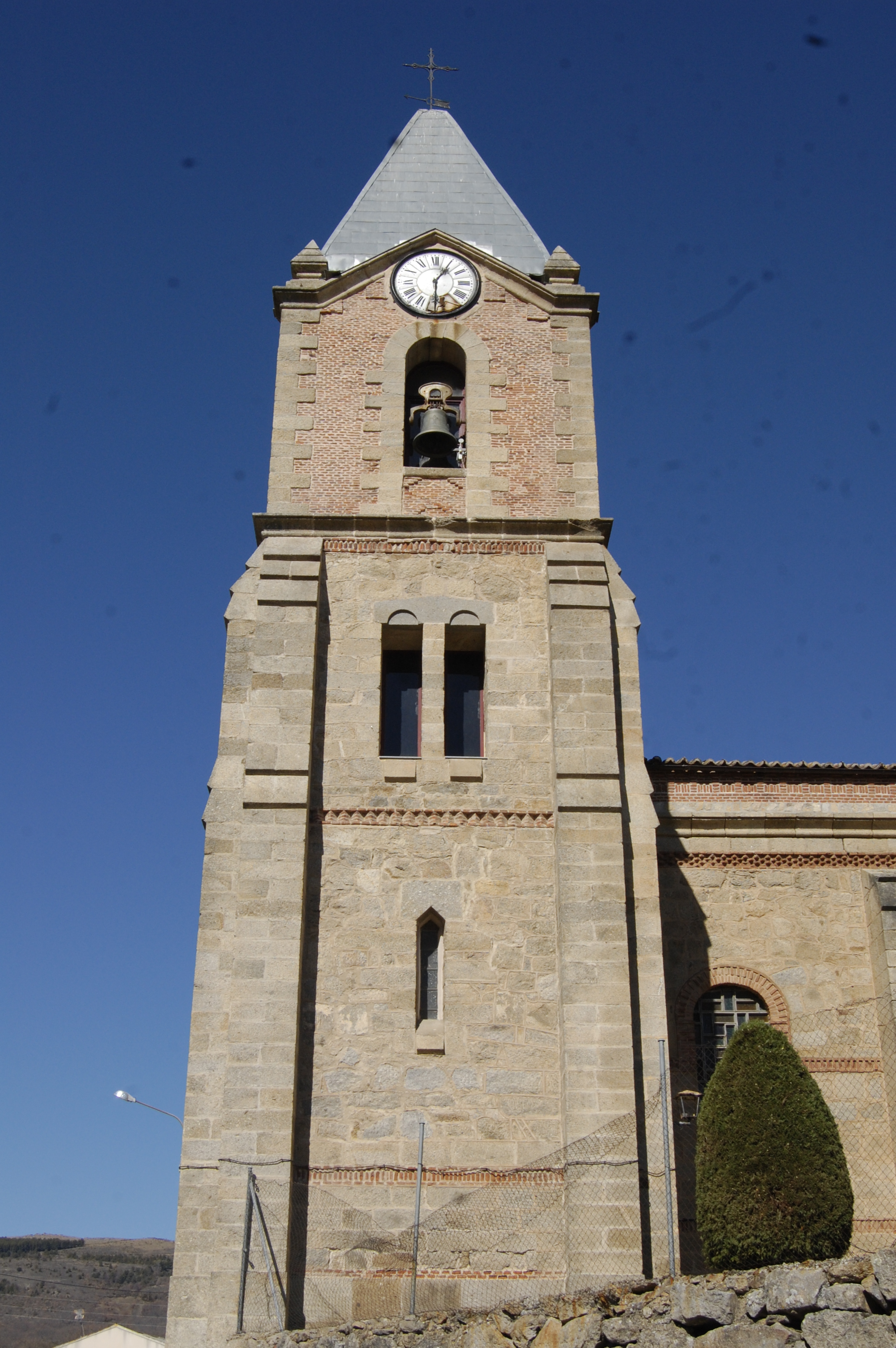
- Parish Church of Santa Ana, La Carrera.

- Coat of arms

- Location in Spain. La Carrera (Castile and León)
- Coordinates: 40°20′52″N 5°33′17″W
- Country: Spain
- Autonomous community: Castile and León
- Province: Ávila

Area
  - Total: 14 km^{2} (5.4 sq mi)

Population (2025-01-01)
  - Total: 155
  - Density: 11/km^{2} (29/sq mi)
- Time zone: UTC+1 (CET)
  - Summer (DST): UTC+2 (CEST)
- Website: Official website

La Carrera is a municipality located in the province of Ávila, Castile and León, Spain.

== Population ==
Historical population
Year	Pop.	±% p.a.
2023	161	—
2024	160	−0.62%
2025	155	−3.12%
Source: INE
