= Operation Galaxia =

1978 Spanish plan for an attempted coup d'état

Coordinates: 40°26′07″N 3°43′06″W

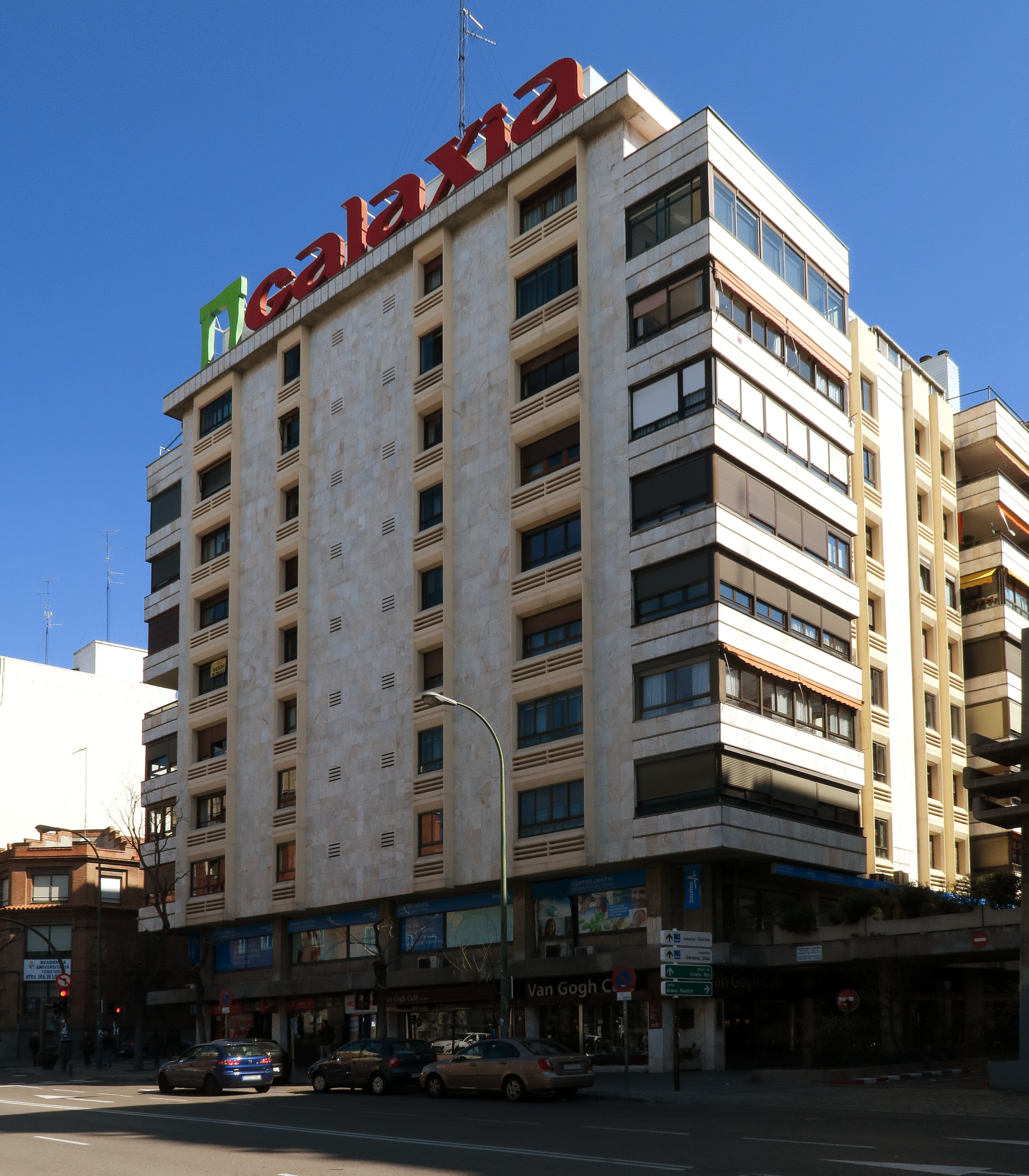
The outside of Cafetería Galaxia

Operation Galaxia (Spanish: Operación Galaxia) was the plan which preceded the 23-F attempted coup d'état in Spain. It was named Galaxia, because the officers who took part met in Cafetería Galaxia in Madrid, on 11 November 1978.

It was meant to take place on 17 November 1978, to stop the Spanish transition to democracy taking place at that time. That date was chosen because the king, Juan Carlos, would be away in South America. The three people in charge of the operation were Guardia Civil Lieutenant Colonel Antonio Tejero, Major Ricardo Sáenz de Ynestrillas Martínez, and another colonel, whose name has not been revealed.

An infantry captain of the police, and an infantry commander of the army were present at the conversation, and informed their superiors of the plot.

On 8 May 1980, the two main suspects, Tejero and Sáenz de Ynestrillas, were court-martialled, and on their way, they were cheered by crowds with nationalist flags, but also insulted, which showed the division of Spain at that time. The attorney general asked for six years for Tejero, and five for Sáenz de Ynestrillas, but they were only given seven months and a day and six months and a day respectively, the minimum sentence. Neither of them lost their military rank, and Sáenz de Ynestrillas was later promoted to commander (major).

In 1986 Sáenz de Ynestrillas was assassinated by ETA along with Lieutenant-Colonel of the Infantry Carlos Vesteiro Pérez, and their driver Private Francisco Casillas. As the car they were travelling in approached Sáenz de Ynestrillas's home on Avenida del Manzanares, Madrid on 17 June 1986, two members of ETA who had been lying in wait opened fire on the car, killing all three. Sáenz de Ynestrillas was 50 at the time of his death.

== 1981 attempt ==
Tejero attempted another coup on 23 February 1981, in the middle of the voting by the deputies for the new prime minister. He took over the Cabinet and lower house of Parliament with 200 men, holding 350 deputies hostage and announcing the constitution of a military junta.

== Sources ==
- Clemyn-Jones, Bill (23 February 1981). "King Orders army to crush coup". The Guardian.
