= Jaime Milans del Bosch =

Spanish lieutenant general (1915–1997)

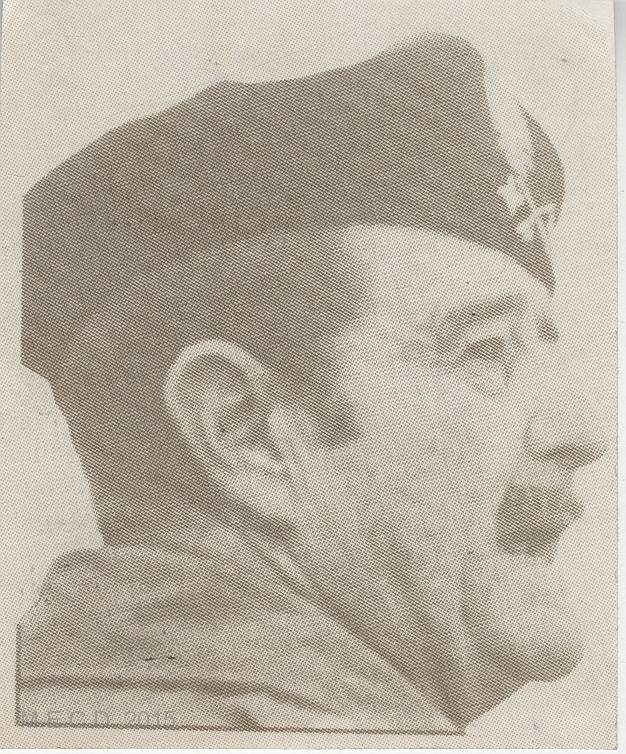
- Milans del Bosch c. 1981
- Born: Jaime Milans del Bosch y Ussía; 8 June 1915; Madrid, Kingdom of Spain
- Died: 26 July 1997 (aged 82); Madrid, Kingdom of Spain
- Burial place: Alcázar of Toledo
- Education: Toledo Infantry Academy
- Relatives: Joaquín Milans del Bosch (grandfather); Francisco Milans del Bosch (great great grandfather)
- Military career
- Allegiance: Spanish Republic; Nationalist faction Francoist Spain; Kingdom of Spain
- Branch: Spanish Army
- Service years: 1934–1981
- Rank: Lieutenant General
- Units: Spanish Legion; Blue Division
- Commands: III Military Region
- Conflicts: Spanish Civil War; World War II; 1981 Spanish coup d'état attempt

Jaime Milans del Bosch y Ussía (Spanish: [ˌxai̯.me miˌlanz ð̞el ˌβ̞osk i‿uˈsi.a]; 8 June 1915 – 26 July 1997) was a lieutenant general in the Spanish Army who was dismissed and imprisoned in 1981 for his role in the failed coup d'état of 23 February 1981.

== Biography ==
Milans del Bosch was born into a noble family whose members had held many senior military ranks. He was the grandson of Joaquín Milans del Bosch. Jaime Milans del Bosch is reported to have repeatedly boasted of how many of his ancestors had participated in coups d'état.

In 1934, he entered the Toledo Infantry Academy. As a cadet, he fought in the Spanish Civil War at the Alcázar of Toledo, where he was injured during a republican bombing. Shortly afterwards, he received his officer's commission in the Spanish Foreign Legion. In 1941, Bosch joined the Blue Division to fight against the Soviet Union under German command.

After the war, he held successive positions as military attaché in Spanish embassies in Latin American countries, including Argentina, Uruguay, Chile and Paraguay.

Promoted to brigadier general in 1971 and major general in 1974, he was appointed commander of the III Military Region (headquartered in Valencia) in 1977, at the rank of lieutenant-general.

== Coup d'état of February 1981 ==
In 1981, Milans del Bosch was the only senior army commander who supported the coup d'état attempt without reservation and conducted offensive operations of importance. On 23 February 1981, shortly after Antonio Tejero had stormed the Spanish Congress of Deputies, he ordered tanks onto the streets of Valencia and decreed a state of emergency.

After the televised message of King Juan Carlos I, those in the military who had not yet committed themselves decided to remain on the side of the government, causing the coup to fail. Despite the lack of support, Milans del Bosch only surrendered at 5 a.m. on the next day, 24 February.

== Court-martial and dishonorable discharge ==
Milans del Bosch was court-martialled on 8 March 1981. On 3 June 1982, he was sentenced to 26 years and 8 months imprisonment and expelled from the army. Barely nine years later, in 1991, he was pardoned and released due to advanced age. He never expressed remorse for his involvement in the coup.

He returned to live in his native Madrid, where he died of a brain tumor in 1997. He is buried at the Alcázar of Toledo.

On 17 September 2018, after the planned exhumation of Francisco Franco, it was proposed by Podemos to also exhume Milans del Bosch and José Moscardó, but this was rejected by Vox.
