= Alfonso Armada =

Spanish military officer (1920–2013)

Divisional General Alfonso Armada
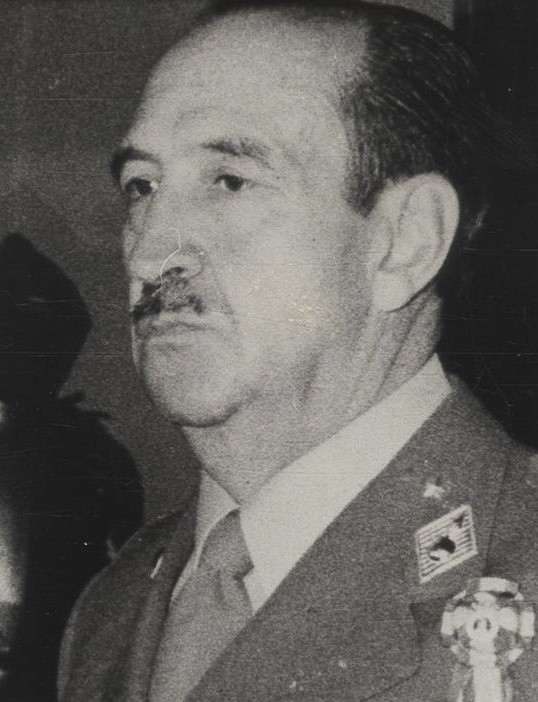
- Armada c. 1981
- Born: Alfonso Armada Comyn; 12 February 1920; Madrid, Spain
- Died: 1 December 2013 (aged 93); Madrid, Spain
- Military career
- Allegiance: Nationalist Spain; Nazi Germany
- Branch: Spanish Army
- Rank: Major General
- Unit: Blue Division
- Conflicts: Spanish Civil War; World War II: Siege of Leningrad; 1981 Spanish coup d'état attempt

Alfonso Armada Comyn, 9th Marquis of Santa Cruz de Rivadulla (12 February 1920 – 1 December 2013) was a Spanish military officer involved in both the Spanish Civil War and the 1981 Spanish coup d'état attempt.

== Biography ==
Armada was born into an aristocratic and pro-monarchist family. He joined the Nationalist faction in the Spanish Civil War and also participated in the Siege of Leningrad during World War II with Nazi Germany and the Blue Division. Armada rose in prestige over decades, eventually becoming a tutor, and then an aide, to Juan Carlos, and becoming part of the Royal Household of Spain when Juan Carlos became king.

Armada was a major figure in the 1981 Spanish coup d'état attempt. Though he pretended to be a mediator in the coup by going to the Congress of Deputies after Antonio Tejero had taken the legislature hostage, Armada's full involvement soon came to light: He was one of the "three main conspirators", and had planned to become president. When Armada went to the legislature, he and Tejero disagreed about the direction of the government, and the coup fell apart. Within five days, Armada was dismissed from all positions and arrested.

In April 1983, Armada was sentenced to 30 years in prison, but received a compassionate release in December 1988 for health reasons. He spent the rest of his life in Rivadulla, Galicia, Spain, and died in 2013.
