= Antonio Tejero =

Spanish Civil Guard colonel and failed coup leader (1932–2026)

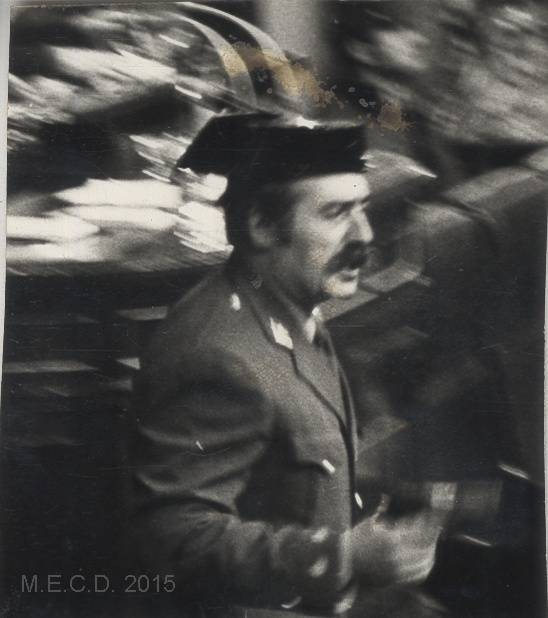
- Antonio Tejero with a gun in his hand, breaking into the Congress of Deputies on 23 February 1981 attempting a coup.
- Born: 30 April 1932; Alhaurín el Grande, Spain
- Died: 25 February 2026 (aged 93); Alzira, Spain
- Spouse: Carmen Díez Pereira
- Children: 6
- Military career
- Allegiance: Spain
- Branch: Guardia Civil
- Service years: 1951–1981
- Rank: Lieutenant Colonel
- Conflicts: 1981 Spanish coup attempt

Antonio Tejero Molina (Note: Spanish: [anˈtonjo teˈxeɾo moˈlina]) (30 April 1932 – 25 February 2026) was a Spanish lieutenant colonel of the Guardia Civil. He was the most prominent figure in the failed coup d'état against the newly democratic Spanish government on 23 February 1981 when he stormed the Congress of Deputies with 200 armed Civil Guards. For this reason, he was sentenced to thirty years imprisonment for the crime of consummated military rebellion, with the aggravating circumstance of recidivism; he had previously been arrested for his involvement in the failed coup attempt during Operation Galaxia in 1978.

== Early life ==
Tejero was born on 30 April 1932 in Alhaurín el Grande, province of Málaga, Spain. His parents had moved there shortly before Tejero was born, and his father began working at a military outpost. The family spent the early years of the Spanish Civil War there.

== Military career ==
Tejero entered the Guardia Civil at the General Military Academy in Zaragoza on 23 July 1951. Tejero was promoted to lieutenant in 1955, remaining on compulsory leave in Melilla. In January 1956, he voluntarily took command of the Capellades line in Catalonia. He was promoted to captain in 1958 and posted to province of Pontevedra, where he remained until 1960 when he was transferred, at his own request, to the province of Málaga.

In 1963, he was promoted to major, and served in Las Palmas de Gran Canaria and Badajoz.

In 1974, he became a lieutenant colonel, serving as the leader of the Comandancia in the Basque province of Guipúzcoa, but had to ask to be transferred to another region when his public declarations against the Basque flag, the Ikurriña, became known. For his accomplishments in the Basque Country, and in combating the ETA, he was named Chief of the Planning Staff of the Civil Guard in Madrid. But during his career, he had also begun to accumulate a record of dissent. ETA militants would rig bombs to Ikurriñas; when police officers tried to remove the flag, which had been banned in 1938 during the Franco regime, the bombs exploded. This killed several Guardia Civil officers. When the ban on the Ikurriña was revoked in 1977, Tejero sent a telegram to Madrid asking if he should pay honors to the Ikurriña. In Málaga, he ordered or took a major part in a military deployment around the town during the seizure of a flag.

In 1978, Tejero, along with Police Captain Ricardo Sáenz de Ynestrillas Martínez and an Army General Staff colonel, whose name was never made public, attempted a coup, known as Operation Galaxia. Tejero was sentenced to a short prison term for mutiny after the collapse of the attempted coup. He was in prison for seven months and seven days.

=== Attempted 1981 coup ===
On 23 February 1981, Tejero entered the Congress of Deputies, the lower house of the Spanish Parliament, with 150 Guardia Civil members and soldiers in an attempted coup d'état, and held the congress members hostage for some 22 hours. He burst into the chamber shouting the order "Everyone freeze!" (Note: Spanish: ¡Quieto todo el mundo!) and "Everyone on the floor!" (Note: Spanish: ¡Al suelo todo el mundo!) before firing into the ceiling, prompting several soldiers to fire shots. Around midnight, when it became clear that no further army units had joined the coup attempt, King Juan Carlos I gave a nationally televised address denouncing it and urging the preservation of law and continuance of the democratically elected government. The following day, the coup leaders surrendered and were arrested by the police.

The trial against the plotters began on 19 February 1982 and Tejero was sentenced by the Supreme Court on 22 April 1983 to 30 years in prison for consummated military rebellion and the aggravating circumstance of recidivism. An archconfraternity requested his pardon, but despite having the support of the Supreme Court, the government rejected it on the grounds that Tejero had not repented, so he remained in prison until 1993 when he was granted parole.

== Life after jail sentence ==
Held in jail after the coup attempt, Tejero founded the Spanish Solidarity party to run in the 1982 general election; if he was elected he would gain parliamentary immunity. With a nationwide total of 28,451 votes (0.14% of votes cast), the party failed to obtain parliamentary representation. Tejero was released from jail on 3 December 1996, the last of the coup participants released, having served 15 years in the Alcalá de Henares military prison. He took up residence in Torre del Mar in the province of Málaga. In 2006, he wrote to the newspaper Melilla Hoy, calling for a referendum on Spanish Socialist Workers' Party (PSOE) proposals granting a new measure of autonomy to Catalonia. In 2006, Tejero attended a homage to former Chilean dictator Augusto Pinochet, who had died. In 2009, Tejero's son, Ramón Tejero Díez, wrote to the conservative newspaper ABC describing his father as a sincere religious man who was trying to do his best for Spain.

As of 2018, Tejero was residing in Madrid and Torre del Mar, and was painting portraits and landscapes. On 23 February 2018, he attended the funeral of the 1st Duchess of Franco. On 29 May 2018, a rumour of Tejero's death was spread and hailed by Spanish military veterans and supporters, but was quickly refuted by his son.

On 24 October 2019, at the age of 87, Tejero took part in a protest against the exhumation of the remains of Francisco Franco from the Valley of the Fallen memorial site and their reburial in Madrid.

== Personal life and death ==
Tejero married Carmen Díez Pereira, a teacher and daughter of a civil guard, with whom he had six children. Some of his children and sixteen grandchildren are civil guards or are married to military officers.

On 23 October 2025, news spread again that Tejero had died. His son denied Tejero's death while acknowledging that he was hospitalized in a critical condition.

Tejero died at his home in Alzira in the province of Valencia, on 25 February 2026, at the age of 93, on the same day that the Spanish government declassified documents regarding his failed coup. His ashes were transferred to a church in Torre del Mar.
