= Spanish Armed Forces during the period of Francoism =

Spanish Armed Forces 1939–1975

Spanish Armed Forces
- Fuerzas Armadas de España
- Flag of Spain (1945–1977)
- Founded: 1939
- Current form: Spanish Armed Forces
- Disbanded: 1975
- Service branches: Spanish Army; Spanish Navy; Spanish Air Force; Civil Guard; Armed Police Corps

Leadership
- Commander-in-chief: Francisco Franco
- Minister of the Army: See list
- Minister of the Navy: See list
- Minister of the Air: See list
- Chief of the Defence High Command: See list

Related articles
- Ranks: Military ranks of the Spanish State

During the period of Francoism, the Spanish Armed Forces were in charge of the national defence and public order of the Spanish territory during the historical period when the Kingdom of Spain was under the control of General Francisco Franco. Its history goes from the beginning of the Civil War, through the military dictatorship, until 1978 and the first years of the transition to democracy.

During the Civil War and the dictatorship, they called themselves the National Army or simply Spanish Army. Due to their loyalty and obedience to Franco, they are also known as the Francoist Army. In fact, during the dictatorship of Francisco Franco it became one of the levers and main supports of Franco's power, and as such it remained until after his death in 1975 and the reinstatement of democracy during the period of the transition.

It had its origins in the forces that rose up in 1936 against the Republican government, starting the Civil War that would last almost three years. When this ended with the victory of Franco as absolute dictator of the country, its organisation changed and its internal structure became bureaucratised. The historian Gabriel Cardona highlights in his works the chronic shortage of material resources, as well as the corruption and enchufismo, which did not contribute to improving the Spanish Armed Forces. Franco's army was more of a police force and an element of pressure for the regime, but incapable of fulfilling the function of a modern army that it was supposed to have been entrusted with.

== Introduction ==
=== Basis of Franco's power ===
During the civil war, the Army became the central nerve of the new totalitarian state, headed by generalissimo Franco, a situation that was confirmed with the final victory in the conflict. In fact, the new uprising state was practically articulated by a military society, The Army had invaded all social and cultural spheres: For example, the newspaper of the Falange, Arriba, had become a mere information organ of the Armed Forces. As an element of power and support for Francoism, the armed forces also played an active part in repression, especially during the early years of the dictatorship. At the beginning of the civil war, the authorisation of death sentences only required the signature or a simple "concurrence" of the military commander on duty. As supreme commander, Franco reserved for himself the final decision on death sentences or pardons. Just as he gave the go-ahead for an execution, he was fully aware of the excesses committed by his subordinates, something he openly tolerated.

From that moment on, the Armed Forces were in a homogeneous relationship with the Franco dictatorship, insofar as they participated in power: their power was manifested both in the direction of the country and through their influence in the government or in the state administration. The Army controlled the Security Forces (whose officers came from the Army), while it was also very present in the cadres of the public administration as civilian governors (in addition to military governors), or state representatives on boards of directors or companies of the National Institute of Industry (INI).

=== Oversized officer's scale ===
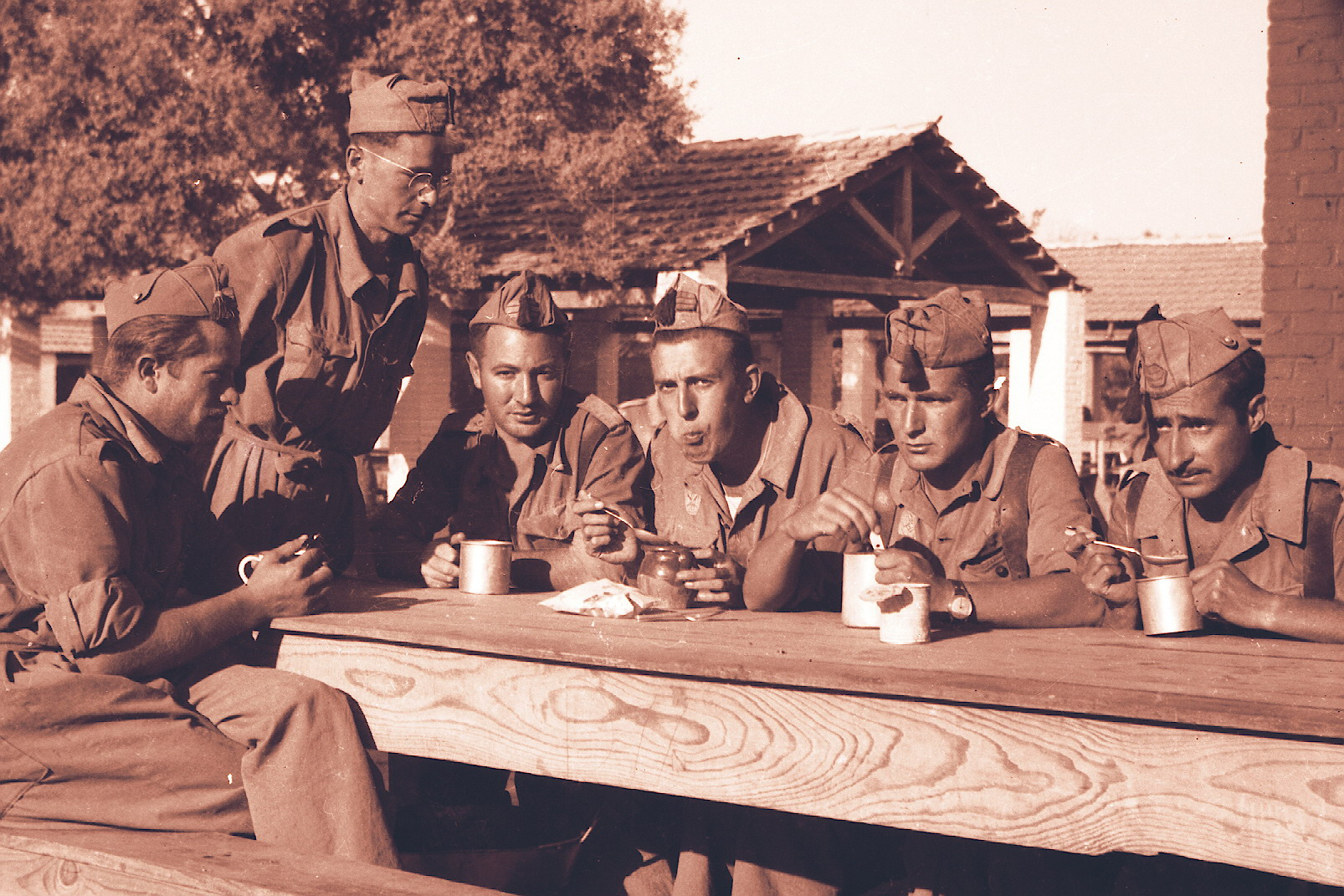
Conscripts doing military service, circa 1945

In 1968 the Ministry of the Army spent 17,400 million pesetas on personnel salaries, 82.2% of the Ministry's total expenditure, while only 1,400 million pesetas (6.5% of the total) were spent on investments (material, technology). By comparison, the Ministry of the Navy spent 3.9 billion pesetas on personnel salaries (57.5% of its total ministry), while the Ministry of Air Force spent 4.3 billion pesetas (47.5%). In addition to personnel salaries, salaries for the security forces amounted to around 90,000 personnel and were distributed as follows:

- 8,200 General Police Corps officers
- 20,000 Armed Police Corps
- 60,000 Civil Guard officers

By then, military expenditure represented up to 17% of the general state budget, or between 19% and 22% if the budgets of the security forces were included.

By 1970 the macrocephaly of officers continued: out of 289,000 members of the armed forces (not counting those of the security forces), 824 were general and flag officers and of these only 216 were in active posts. (Note: These figures included 618 lieutenant generals, major generals and brigadier generals in the Army; 94 admirals, vice admirals and rear admirals in the Navy; and 112 lieutenant generals, major generals and brigadier generals in the Air Force.) Still in the 1970s, many officers of the Armed Forces still received very low salaries, so they continued to moonlight in both the public administration and private companies.

== Operational history ==
=== Origins ===
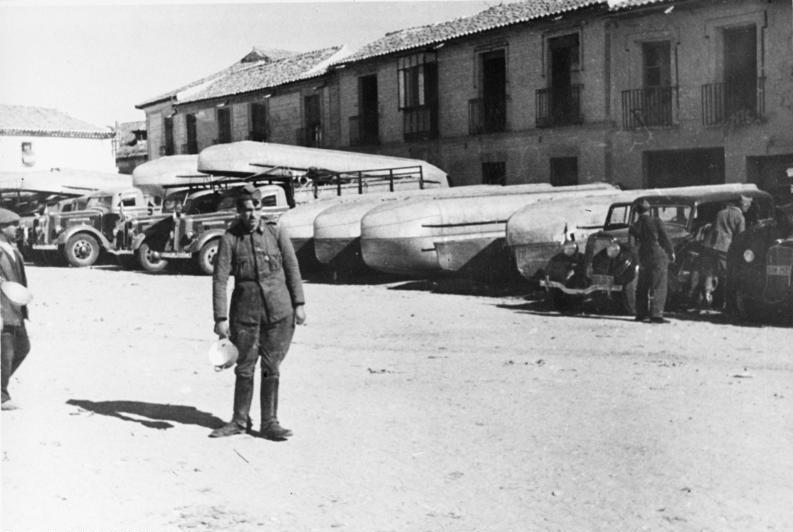
Pontoons of the Nationalist army, 1936

The Spanish Army in 1936, just before the start of the Spanish Civil War, was divided into eleven territorial military regions. Eight of them were organic divisions, three others were military commands and the last corresponded to the Territory of Morocco. After the beginning of the conflict, this structure was fractured into two states and was completely altered.

According to historian Francisco Alía Miranda, after the coup d'état in July 1936, the distribution of generals, chiefs, officers and cadets between the two sides was 8,929 in the Republican zone and 9,294 in the Nationalist zone. In the Republican zone, 116,501 troops remained vs 140,604 in the Nationalist zone, including the 47,127 soldiers who made up the Spanish Army of Africa, the most highly trained Spanish military unit, with the most combat experience. This made the balance of forces favourable to the Nationalists on this point. Another element in their favour was that while the generals and high commanders remained mostly loyal to the Republic, the chiefs and intermediate officers largely joined the uprising. Furthermore, the number of chiefs and officers on the Nationalist side grew until it reached 14,104 on 1 April 1939, while on the Republican side their numbers fell to 4,771; this was primarily due to the transfer of many commanders and officers to the opposing side during the course of the war. As the aforementioned historian has pointed out, most of the 18,000 officers in Spain in July 1936 applauded the coup, since a conservative, corporatist and militarist mentality predominated among them.

The plans drawn up by General Mola failed when it became clear in early August that the uprising had failed in three-fifths of the country, but by early September it appeared that the Nationalists were on their way to military victory in their fight against the Second Republic.

On September 28, a meeting of the Junta de Defensa Nacional was held near the city of Salamanca where the main military leaders of the Bando Sublevado agreed to appoint General Francisco Franco as Generalissimo of the armies and head of state during the war period. Although General Alfredo Kindelán's proposal envisaged that the appointment would be for the duration of the war period, the decree did not include such a limitation:

Franco's concerns at this time were more political than military, since in this respect he remained convinced that the African forces were sufficient to resolve a conflict whose end he saw as near, and he did not feel the need to go, like his opponents, to the creation of a new army

— Ángel and Ramón Salas Larrazábal.

On October 1, Franco installed himself in Burgos as the new undisputed leader of the Nationalists, confident that Madrid would fall in a matter of weeks, and more concerned with the political organisation of the new Nationalist state that was being forged at the time. One of the first decrees of the new Boletín Oficial del Estado confirmed the existence of the Armies of the North (Norte) and the South (Sur), which at the time were the largest and most important military units. Major General Queipo de Llano was put in charge of the fronts of the II Organic Division and of the province of Badajoz, in what was constituted as the Army of the South. The Army of the North would be commanded by Brigadier General Emilio Mola Vidal, responsible for the entire northern zone of the Nationalists, including the Cantabrian Sea, and the ports of Somosierra and Guadarrama. General Orgaz was appointed Spanish High Commissioner in Morocco, while Lieutenant Colonel Juan Luis Beigbeder was appointed his deputy as Delegate for Indigenous Affairs.

In the same month of October, the High Court of Military Justice was created, which, with a new name, revived the High Council of War and the Navy, which had been abolished by Manuel Azaña in 1931. Colonel Lorenzo Martínez Fuset, Franco's personal advisor, became one of the organisers of the military tribunals and their legal organisation when carried out. General Francisco Gómez-Jordana Sousa was appointed president of the State Technical Board. Admiral Juan Cervera Valderrama was appointed head of the General Staff of the Spanish Navy and Captain Francisco Moreno was confirmed as Commander of the Fleet. (1976) Compared to other military men, Admiral Cervera was very active in securing supplies and new equipment for the Armada sublevada, as he was convinced that control of the sea would be decisive for the conflict. The general and veteran aviator Alfredo Kindelán was in charge of the direction and organisation of the new Nationalist air forces.

=== Spanish Civil War ===
From April 1937, when it became clear that the conflict was going to be a long one, the organic divisions were renamed Army Corps, adjusting to sectors of the front. The territory corresponding to the V Organic Division became the Army Corps of Aragon, the VI Organic Division, the Army Corps of Navarre, the VII, the Army Corps of Castile, and the VIII was the Army Corps of Galicia. At the same time, the military regions were gradually recovered on the basis of the former organic divisions.

By March, the Nationalist forces had a force of around 300,000 men in arms. By the end of the year the national army had 500,000 enlisted men, a figure slightly lower than the number of troops in the Popular Republican Army. In fact, at this point eleven reservist replacements had been mobilised. Among the men who made up this army were not only deserters from the Republican zone but also soldiers who had been taken prisoner and forced to re-enlist in the Republican zone. And despite the many soldiers forcibly conscripted, there were possibly 100,000 Carlists and more than 200,000 Falangists enlisted. On the other hand, among these forces were 40,000 Moroccan troops belonging to the Spanish Army of Africa, which included the Spanish Legion and the dreaded Regulares; the African units were already distributed among Franco's army. By then, all these troops had been reorganised into divisions and were slowly losing the territorial significance of their former origin, or their original composition. In addition to these forces, the reserve comprised more than 200 battalions of infantry and 70 batteries of artillery, all of which were led by General Orgaz.

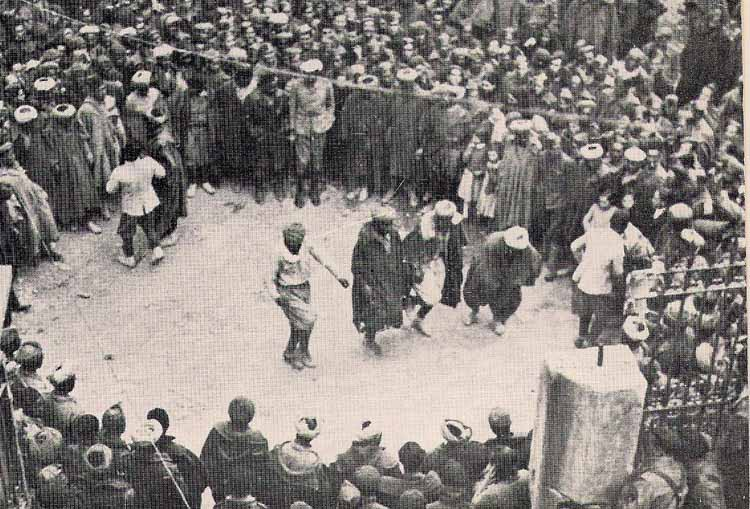
Moroccan troops celebrating the conquest of Rubielos de Mora in 1938

The national victory in the Northern Offensive allowed the fleet to move to the Mediterranean to be concentrated there, and 65,000 men of the Army of the North to become available, together with their armaments, to join the southern front. In fact, these forces would take part in the decisive Aragon Offensive which began on 7 March 1938 and took the Nationalists as far as the Segre River and the Mediterranean Sea, cutting the Republican zone in two. In the following months the offensive was directed towards Valencia, although this attack failed and resulted in heavy casualties. In July the Republican offensive on the Ebro managed to surprise Franco's rearguard, but after several months of bloody counterattacks the Republican forces fled after heavy attrition suffered by the Popular Army.

By the end of 1938 the forces of the National Army numbered over a million, including most of the able men between the ages of 18 and 31, as well as numerous volunteers. The Army was divided into 4 major troop groupings: the Army of the South, inactive in Andalusia and under the command of Queipo de Llano; the Army of the centre, under the command of Saliquet; the Ejército del Norte, commanded by Dávila; and the Ejército de Levante, the revelation of the war, commanded by General Orgaz. At that time it consisted of 61 infantry divisions (840,000 men), 15,323 cavalry, 19,013 artillery, 35,000 African Army, 32,000 Italians from the Corpo Truppe Volontarie, 5,000 Germans from the Condor Legion and a further 119,594 from auxiliary services. In total, 1,065,941 troops. At this point in the war the Republicans were exhausted, practically without reserves: In December the Catalonia Offensive began, which ended in February 1939 with the conquest of the region and a great military success for Franco's Armed Forces. On 26 March the final offensive of the Civil War began, with the unopposed advance of Franco's armies on the demoralised rearguard of Republican Spain. At nightfall on 31 March, the port of Alicante, the last unconquered position, surrendered, officially ending the civil war.

=== Post-war and World War II ===
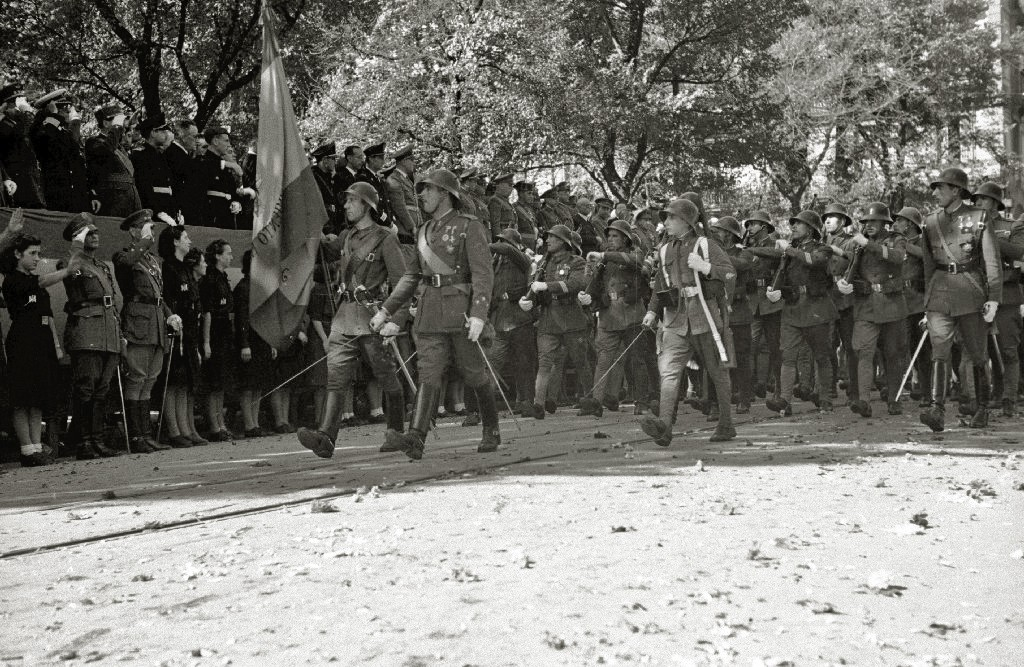
Military parade in San Sebastian (1942)

At the end of the civil war, the Army had 850,000 infantrymen, 19,000 artillerymen and substantial cavalry forces. However, they lacked adequate air cover, there were hardly any mechanised and armoured forces, and the overall equipment in the army was poor. During the summer of 1939 a partial demobilisation was decided, reducing its size from 61 divisions to almost half. However, with World War II looming and Franco's personal fears of an uncertain future, he decided to replace the armed forces of the war with an army of occupation with more than 500,000 privates and 22,210 officers on a war footing. The decision not to demobilise such large numbers of troops reflected the realisation that the civil war had not ended the internal conflicts, but it also came at a high cost to the country as a whole: absorbing 45.8% of the national budget in 1941 and 53.1% in 1943, this was a totally disproportionate expenditure, and even more so for a country devastated by the civil war. Added to this was a country with a shattered economy and infrastructure, which left military logistics in a disastrous state. As if the problems were not enough, there were also the conspiracies of some important military men such as Alfredo Kindelán, Luis Orgaz Yoldi, Antonio Aranda Mata and Juan Yagüe. As the post-war period progressed, the High Command's criticism of Falangist corruption and inefficiency in the state administration increased. Franco, however, ignored both Falangist corruption and the corruption and fickleness that took place within the army.

Franco's attempts to enter World War II were not few and far between: among some generals there was open hostility towards Falangist circles that advocated entry into the war, which the military considered little less than "unconscious adventurism". Numerous reports were issued from the General Staff indicating the serious shortcomings and deficiencies of the armed forces, in addition to the disastrous situation in the country. Franco established during the Meeting at Hendaye that the theoretical alliance with the Axis would be kept secret until Franco's government considered it appropriate to enter the war. The Generalissimo insisted on the commitment to the Axis before his brother-in-law Serrano Súñer, despite the fact that in October the High Command issued another even more critical report on the situation of the Armed Forces and the physical and psychological exhaustion of the Spanish population.

During World War II, a significant number of generals and officers were on the payroll of the British secret services, who sought either their connivance with the Allied cause, or the flow of information on the activities and decisions of Franco's High Command. Institutionalised corruption in state administration also occurred in the army, becoming commonplace despite the severe economic shortages suffered by the armed forces. There were cases such as that of General Helí Rolando de Tella y Cantos, who was deprived of military honours for "administrative irregularities" consisting of using military vehicles and personnel in his flour factory, and in the reconstruction of a pazo in Lugo when he was military governor.

The anti-Franco Spanish Maquis guerrilla, although considered by the regime propaganda as a mere group of bandits and brigands, provoked the presence of complete military units and forces of the Civil Guard, and a very harsh repression against both the guerrillas and all those who supported them.

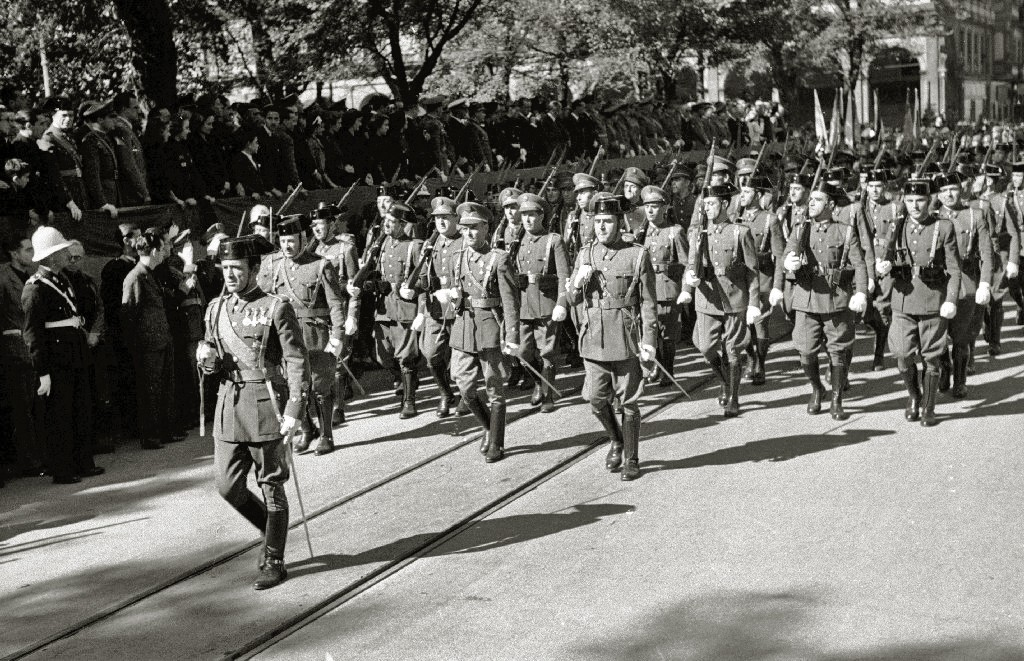
Rural and customs and border protection guards of the Civil Guard on parade in San Sebastian (1942)

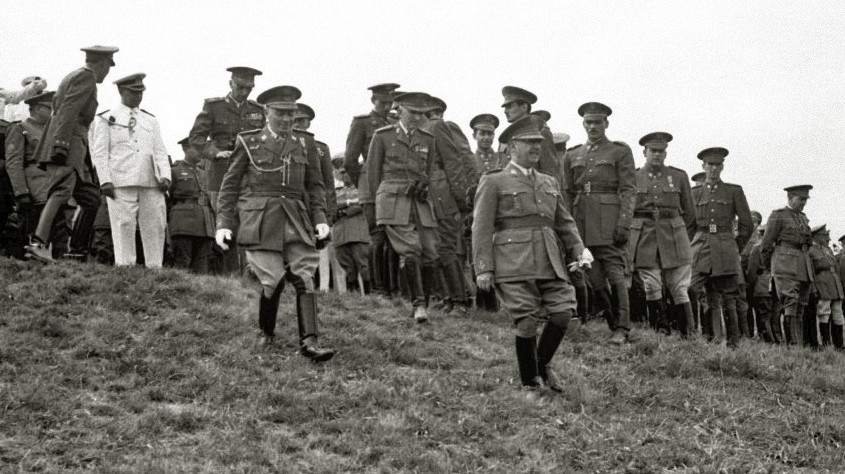
Francisco Franco and other military commanders attending a field exercise (1944)

== Armament suppliers ==
During the Spanish Civil War, given that much of the Nationalists' armament was imported from Fascist Italy and Nazi Germany, there was little need for the weapons produced in their own arms factories (except for the manufacture of explosives and ammunition). Nevertheless, Hispano-Suiza had set up a new factory in Seville to repair and rebuild Fiat CR-32 fighters, while the armament and explosives factories in the north were making a significant contribution to reducing the subversive state's debt to Nazi Germany. By the end of the war, the Germans had sent 200 Panzer I tanks and some 600 aircraft, including 136 Messerschmitt Bf 109, 93 Heinkel He 111 and 63 Junkers Ju 52. Numerous artillery pieces were also sent, such as the famous FlaK 18 8.8 cm. For their part, the Italians sent 660 aircraft, including 350 Fiat CR 32 fighters, 100 Savoia-Marchetti S.M.79 and 64 Savoia-Marchetti S.M.81. Some 800 pieces of artillery were also sent, a number notably higher than the Germans had sent, as well as 150 tanks. Other shipments of material were also notable: 1,414 aircraft engines, 10,000 machine guns, 240,000 rifles or 7,660 motorised vehicles.

After the end of the civil war, the new Air Minister, Juan Yagüe, attempted to build a new Air Army with the help of Germany and Italy, and with the clear intention that it would participate in the world war in favour of the Axis. The attempt, however, failed, given the situation in the country and the impossibility of carrying out such a project under those conditions. In 1943, the Spanish army and government negotiated the Bär Programme with the German Army, discussing procurement alternatives and delivery dates. The Germans offered to sell 20 Panzer IV tanks, 10 Sturmgeschütz III assault guns and other materials, less than Spain requested, but the offer was accepted. As early as January 1944, Spain again began negotiations with Germany for the purchase of more equipment, although the programme did not materialise.

In 1953 the United States and Spain agreed to sign a military aid treaty by which the Americans supplied armaments and technology to the Spanish armed forces. As soon as he was appointed Minister of the Navy (1962), Pedro Nieto Antúnez presented an ambitious naval programme that included the construction of some 150 ships, a project that was far from reality. In 1963 a more suitable mini-plan was approved, comprising the acquisition of a light cruiser and five frigates similar to the British Leander class. However, Harold Wilson's Labour government rejected the sale of the frigates to the Franco regime, forcing the Spanish naval industry to manufacture the ships on its own. It was not the first time that the Armed Forces had encountered such a problem.

The US ban on the use of US munitions supplied as military aid to Spain during the Ifni War, pushed Spain to seek alternative equipment that could be freely employed, especially in the Spanish Sahara. Throughout the 1960s, the Spanish government had gradually approached the French and German governments, hoping to obtain the AMX-30 or the Leopard 1, respectively. Ultimately, the Germans were unable to sell the Leopard tank because the gun system was British and, at that time, the Labour government again refused to sell armaments to the Franco government. As a result, Spain and France agreed in May 1970 to the sale of 19 AMX-30 main battle tanks. All of these were delivered to the Spanish Legion deployed in the Spanish Sahara. From 1974, Spain began to manufacture the AMX-30 (called AMX-30E), with the production of the first batch of 180 tanks until 25 June 1979.

== Titular ministers ==
On 31 January 1938, General Fidel Dávila Arrondo was appointed Minister of National Defence under the Franco's first government, with the three military branches remaining under his command: Land, Marine and Air Force. However, after the end of the Civil War, on 9 August 1939, the ministry was split and its roles taken over by the Minister of the Army, Minister of the Navy and Minister of the Air.

== Armed Forces employment stripes and badges ==
Ranks were placed on the sleeve cuffs of the jacket and on the shoulder straps of the sahariana (service uniform). Until after the end of the Civil War, general badges did not wear a crown, which was suppressed by the Second Republic, after which the open crown of the Catholic Monarchs was used. Until 1943 the Captain General wore three stars, the Lieutenant General two and both the Major General and the Brigadier General wore one star, the latter being silver. The rank of Lance Corporal was restored in 1940 and those of Sublieutenant/Warrant Officer and First Sergeant in 1960. In the Navy, the stripes for the ratings of corporal and first/preferred or distinguished seaman were red for professionals, green for replacements.

== See also ==
- Spanish Armed Forces
- Spanish Republican Armed Forces
- Francoist Spain
- Military Regions of Spain
- German involvement in the Spanish Civil War
- Italian military intervention in Spain

== Bibliography ==
- Aguilar, Mariano (1999). El ejército español durante el franquismo. Madrid: Ediciones Akal. ISBN 84-460-0962-5.
- Arósteui, Julio (1991). Los Combatientes Carlistas en la Guerra Civil Española (1936-1939). Madrid: Colección Fondo Aportes. ISBN 8486745039.
- "The Carlist fighters in the Spanish Civil War (1936-1939):The sources used for this work are not exclusively military archives, such as the Archive of the War of Liberation, the Military Historical Service of Madrid or the Archive of the National Militia, but also the General Archive of Navarre or those belonging to the Fal Conde family or the Count of Rodezno.". Archived from the original on 2020-08-30.
- Alía Miranda, Francisco (2018). History of the Spanish Army and its political intervention. Madrid: Los Libros de la Catarata. ISBN 978-84-9097-459-9.
- Gabriel Cardona (2003), El gigante descalzo. El ejército de Franco
- Cardona, Gabriel (2008). El poder militar en el franquismo. Madrid: For de viento. ISBN 9788496495265.
- Casas de la Vega, Rafael (1974). Las milicias nacionales en la guerra de España. Editora Nacional. ISBN 8427611544.}
- Engel Masoliver, Carlos (2010). Franco Historia de las Divisiones del Ejército Nacional 1936-1939 (Tercera ed.). Madrid: Almena. ISBN 9788492714179.
- Juan Carlos (1990), Ideology of Franco's Army (1939–1959), Madrid. ISBN 8470902253
- Martínez Bande, José Manuel (1968–1985). Monographies of the Spanish Civil War. Editorial San Martín.
- Ortega Martín, José (2008); La Transformación de Los Ejércitos Españoles (1975-2008), UNED - Madrid.
- Preston, Paul (1994). Franco "Caudillo de España" (3.ª ed.). Barcelona: Grijalbo. ISBN 84-253-2498-X.
- Paul Preston (2008), The Great Manipulator. La Mentira cotidiana de Franco, ISBN 9788466638296
- Puell de la Villa, Fernando (2012). The Military Transition. Documentos de Trabajo Fundación Transición Española. ISSN 2171-7699.
- Salas Larrazábal, Ramón (1986). Historia General de la Guerra de España. Rialp. ISBN 978-84-96016-83-5.
- Ramón Tamames (1974), History of Spain Alfaguara VII. The Republic. La Era de Franco, Madrid
- Thomas, Hugh (1976). The Spanish Civil War. Barcelona: Grijalbo. ISBN 84-253-2767-9.
