= Spain during World War II =

During World War II, the Spanish State under Francisco Franco espoused neutrality as its official wartime policy. This neutrality wavered at times, and "strict neutrality" gave way to "non-belligerence" after the Fall of France in June 1940. Franco contemplated joining the Axis powers in support of his allies Italy and Germany, who brought the Spanish Nationalists into power during the Spanish Civil War (1936–1939). On 19 June, he wrote to Adolf Hitler offering to join the war in exchange for help building Spain's colonial empire. Later in the same year Franco met with Hitler in Hendaye to discuss Spain's possible accession to the Axis. The meeting was unsuccessful, but Franco did help the Italians and the Germans in various ways.

Despite ideological sympathy, Franco stationed field armies in the Pyrenees to deter Axis occupation of the Iberian Peninsula. The Spanish policy frustrated Axis proposals that would have encouraged Franco to take British-controlled Gibraltar. Much of the reason for Spanish reluctance to join the war was due to Spain's reliance on imports from the United States and the United Kingdom as well as fear of the latter's military power. Spain also was still recovering from its civil war, and Franco knew his armed forces would not be able to defend the Canary Islands and Spanish Morocco from a British attack.

In 1941, Franco approved the recruitment of volunteers to Germany on the guarantee that they only fight against the Soviet Union and not against the western Allies. This resulted in the formation of the "Blue Division" which fought as part of the German army on the Eastern Front between 1941 and 1944. In addition, Franco allowed German U-boats to refuel in Spanish ports, a pro-Axis propaganda campaign in the Spanish press, allowed transport of tungsten and foodstuffs to Germany, permitted Gestapo spies to operate in the country and created the Jewish Archive in case the Germans wanted Spanish Jews.

Spanish policy returned to "strict neutrality" as the tide of war started to turn against the Axis. American pressure in 1944 for Spain to stop tungsten exports to Germany and to withdraw the Blue Division led to an oil embargo which forced Franco to yield. After the war, Spain was not allowed to join the newly created United Nations because of the wartime support for the Axis Powers, and Spain was isolated by many other countries until the mid-1950s after which it became an anti-communist ally of the United States' Western Bloc during the Cold War.

== Domestic politics ==
During World War II, Spain was governed by an autocratic government, but despite Franco's own pro-Axis leanings and debt of gratitude to Benito Mussolini and Adolf Hitler, the government was divided between Germanophiles and Anglophiles. When the war started, Anglophile Juan Luis Beigbeder was minister of foreign affairs. German victories convinced Franco to replace him with Ramón Serrano Suñer, Franco's brother-in-law and a strong Germanophile as part of it's failed attempt to join the Axis powers (18 October 1940). After Allied victories in North Africa in summer 1942, Franco changed tack again, replacing Serrano Suñer with pro-British Francisco Gómez-Jordana Sousa in September. Another influential Anglophile was the Duke of Alba, Spain's ambassador in London.

== Diplomacy ==
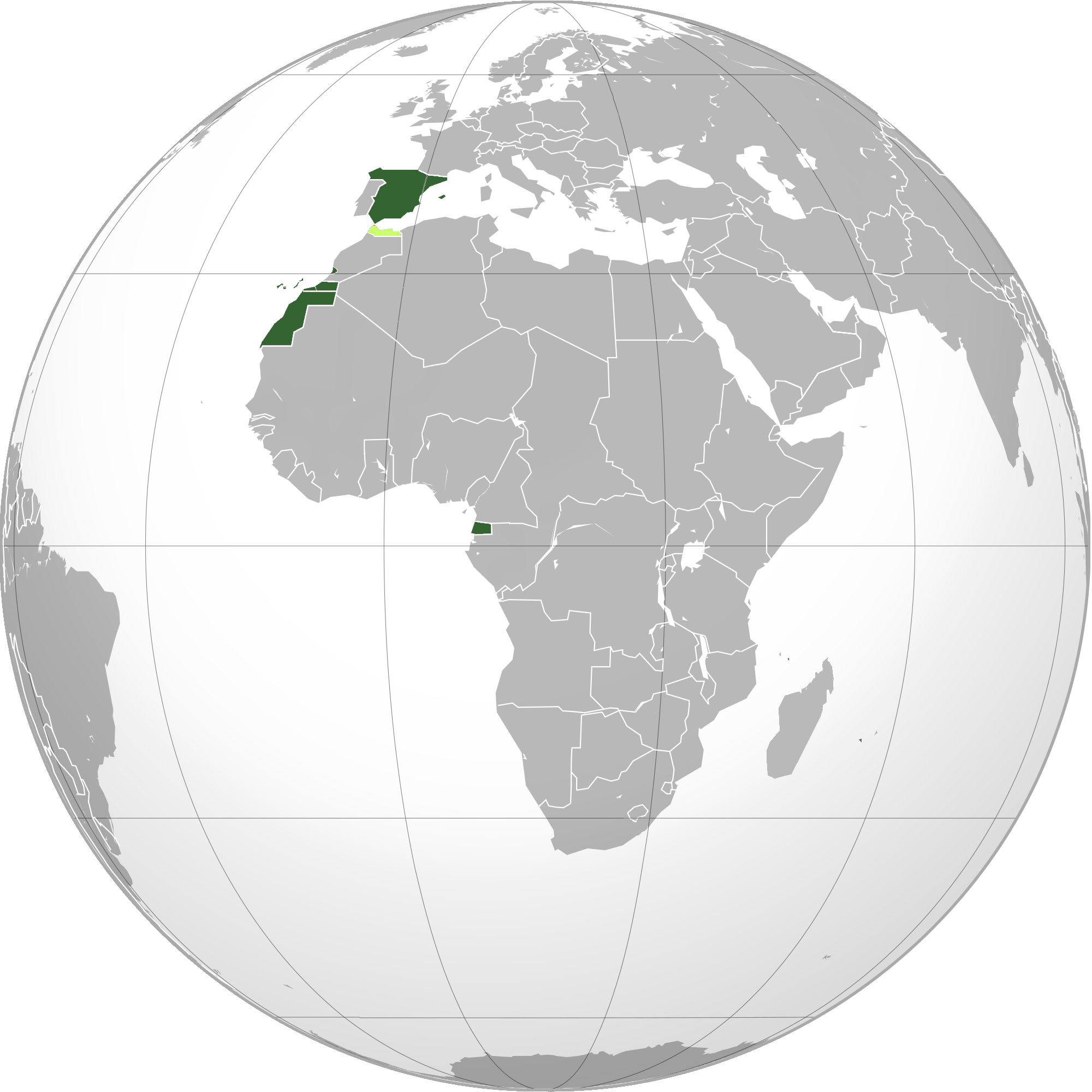
Territories and colonies of the Spanish State in these years: Spain, Ifni, Spanish Sahara and Spanish Guinea Protectorate in Morocco Tangier International Zone

From the very beginning of World War II, Francoist Spain favoured the Axis powers (see: Franco's foreign policy during World War II). Moreover, Spain under Franco had grandiose imperial ambitions, influenced by Falangist ideas, beginning with the reclamation of Gibraltar from Britain, followed by the annexation of French Morocco and other French African territories. In fact, the Franco regime implemented a program of rearmament and expansion of the Spanish military, along with maintaining an army of over half a million men and building fortifications near Gibraltar, the Pyrenees, the Balearic Islands, the Canaries, and Spanish Morocco, and a possible attack on Gibraltar and French Morocco as early as October 1939. Apart from ideology, Spain owed Germany $212 million for supplies of matériel during the Civil War.

In June 1940, after the Fall of France, Franco sent General Juan Vigón to meet with Hitler to discuss Spanish demands for entering the war and the Spanish Ambassador in Berlin had presented a memorandum in which Franco declared he was "ready under certain conditions to enter the war on the side of Germany and Italy". Franco had cautiously decided to enter the war on the Axis side in June 1940, and to prepare his people for war, an anti-British and anti-French campaign was launched in the Spanish media that demanded the return of Gibraltar and French Morocco, alongside the annexation of parts of French Cameroon and Mauritania into Spanish Sahara and Guinea. Additionally, Spanish forces would seize control over the French-controlled Tangier International Zone after the fall of France as the first step towards territorial expansion.

On 19 June 1940, Franco pressed a message to Hitler saying he wanted to enter the war, but Hitler was annoyed at Franco's demand for the French colony of Cameroon, which had been German before World War I, and which Hitler was planning on taking back.

Hitler and Franco during the Meeting at Hendaye (23 October 1940).

At first Hitler did not encourage Franco's offer, as he was convinced that Britain would eventually ask for terms of peace after the fall of France. In August 1940, when Hitler became serious about having Spain enter the war amidst strong British resistance during the Battle of Britain, a major problem that emerged was the German demand for the annexation of one of the Canaries and air and naval bases in Spanish Morocco, to which Franco was completely opposed. After the victory over France, Hitler had revived Plan Z (shelved in September 1939) for having a huge fleet with the aim of fighting the United States, and he wanted bases in Morocco and the Canary Islands for the planned showdown with America. The American historian Gerhard Weinberg wrote: "The fact that Germans were willing to forgo Spain's participation in the war rather than abandon their plans for naval bases on and off the coast of Northwest Africa surely demonstrates the centrality of this latter issue to Hitler as he looked forward to naval war with the United States". In September, when the Royal Air Force had demonstrated its resilience in defeating the Luftwaffe in the Battle of Britain, Hitler promised Franco help in return for its active intervention. This had become part of a strategy to forestall Allied intervention in north-west Africa. Hitler promised that "Germany would do everything in its power to help Spain" and would recognise Spanish claims to French territory in Morocco, in exchange for a share of Moroccan raw materials. Franco responded warmly, but without any firm commitment. Falangist media agitated for irredentism, claiming for Spain the portions of Catalonia and the Basque Country that were still under French administration.

Hitler and Franco met only once at Hendaye, France on 23 October 1940 to fix the details of an alliance. By this time, the advantages had become less clear for either side. Franco asked for too much from Hitler. In exchange for entering the war alongside Germany and Italy, Franco, among many things, wanted the territorial annexation of Morocco and other territories in French Africa, heavy fortification of the Canary Islands, as well as large quantities of grain, fuel, armoured vehicles, military aircraft and other armaments. In particular, Franco's demands for French territory were rejected by Hitler who did not want to disrupt Nazi Germany's relationship with Philippe Petain's Vichy France. At the end of the day, no agreement was reached. A few days later in Germany, Hitler famously told Mussolini, "I prefer to have three or four of my own teeth pulled out than to speak to that man again!"

The UK and the US used economic inducements to keep Spain neutral in 1940.

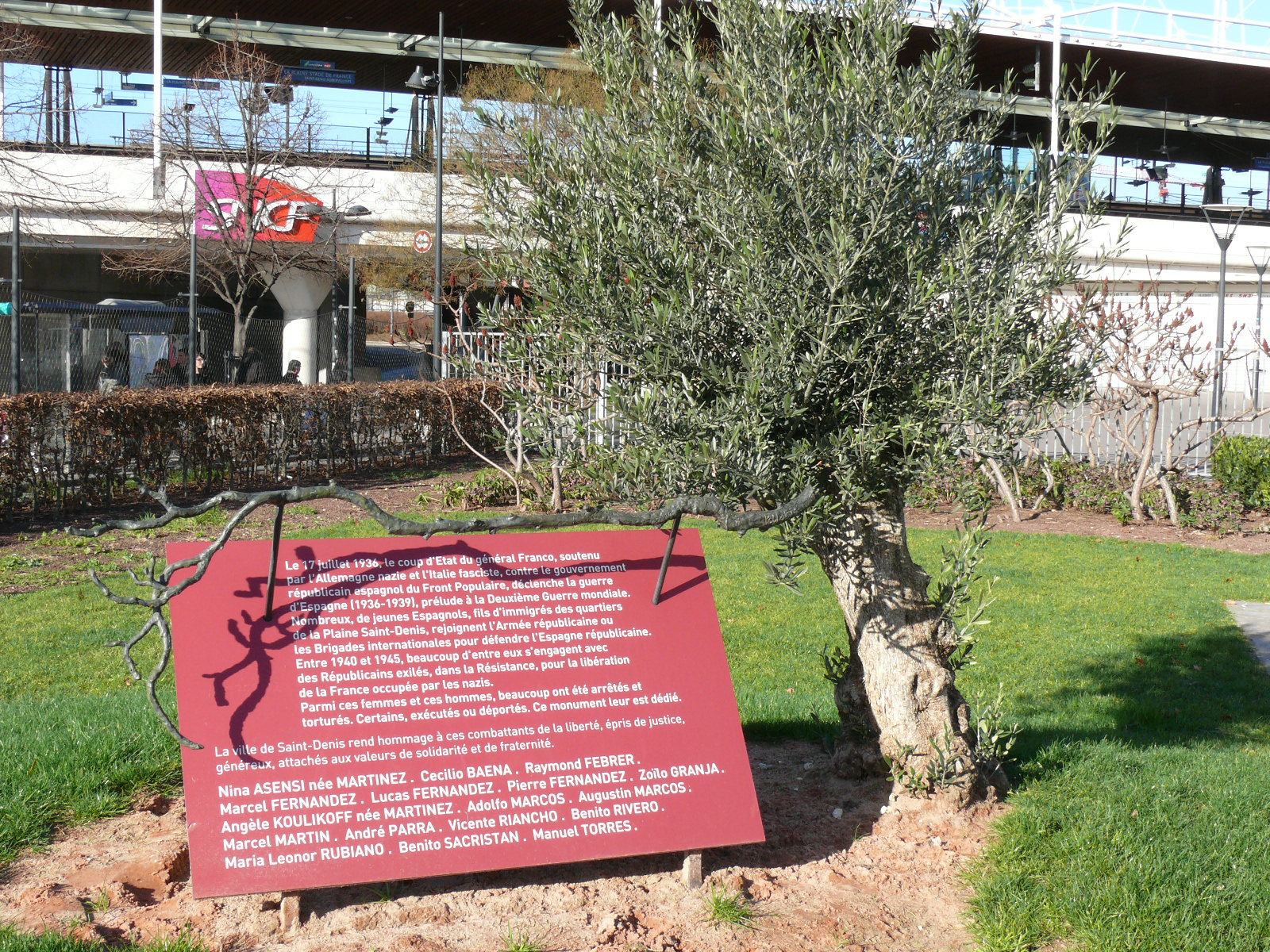
Memorial to the Spanish immigrants to France who fought in the Spanish Civil War, and in the French Resistance. Garden of the Rights of the Child, Saint-Denis

Spain relied upon food and oil supplies from the United States, and the US had agreed to listen to British recommendations on this. As a result, the Spanish were told that supplies would be restricted, albeit with a ten-week reserve. Lacking a strong navy, any Spanish intervention would rely, inevitably, upon German ability to supply oil. Some of Germany's own activity relied upon captured French oil reserves, so additional needs from Spain were unhelpful. From the German point of view, Vichy's active reaction to British and Free French attacks at Mers-el-Kebir and Dakar had been encouraging, so perhaps Spanish intervention was less vital. Also, in order to keep Vichy "on-side", the proposed territorial changes in Morocco became a potential embarrassment and were diluted. As a consequence of this, neither side would make sufficient compromises and after nine hours, the talks failed.

In December 1940, Hitler contacted Franco again via a letter sent by the German ambassador to Spain and returned to the issue of Gibraltar. Hitler attempted to force Franco's hand with a blunt request for the passage of several divisions of German troops through Spain to attack Gibraltar. Franco refused, citing the danger that the United Kingdom still presented to Spain and the Spanish colonies as well as Spanish reliance on food, oil and other supplies from the UK and the US. In his return letter, Franco told Hitler that he wanted to wait until Britain "was on the point of collapse". In a second diplomatic letter, Hitler got tougher and offered grain and military supplies to Spain as an inducement. By this time, however, Italian troops were being routed by the British in Cyrenaica and Italian East Africa, and the Royal Navy had displayed its freedom of action in Italian waters. The UK was clearly not finished. Franco responded "that the fact has left the circumstances of October far behind" and "the Protocol then agreed must now be considered outmoded".

At Hitler's request, Franco also met privately with Italian leader Benito Mussolini in Bordighera, Italy on 12 February 1941. Hitler hoped that Mussolini could persuade Franco to enter the war. However, Mussolini was not interested in Franco's help after the series of defeats his forces had recently suffered in North Africa and the Balkans.

Franco signed the Anti-Comintern Pact on 25 November 1941. In 1942, the planning of Operation Torch (Allied landings in North Africa) was considerably influenced by the apprehension that it might precipitate Spain to abandon neutrality and join the Axis, in which case the Straits of Gibraltar might be closed. In order to meet this contingency, it was decided by the Combined Chiefs of Staff to include a landing in Casablanca, in order to have an option of an overland route via Moroccan territory bypassing the Straits.

In 1945 the widow of the executed Admiral Wilhelm Canaris was awarded a pension for life by Franco's government, in recognition of the advice given to Franco by Canaris to keep Spain out of the war; "advice Franco took and was forever grateful for."

After the Battle of Manila (1945), Francoist Spain broke relations with Empire of Japan (as the Japanese massacres affected Spanish citizens and Catholic missionaries, Mestizo Filipinos with Spanish ancestry, the colonial infrastructure from Spanish Philippines and the Consulate of Spain), and thus concluded an approach to the Allies, a process that started years earlier with the ascension of Francisco Gómez-Jordana Sousa as Foreign Relations Minister, and the withdrawal of the German Army from Occupied France. Also, it was considered by Franco to declare war against Japan in March 1945, and joining to the Allies while also defending Spanish interests in its former colony, but the proposal was rejected by both UK and USA diplomacy.

Franco's policy of open support to the Axis Powers led to a period of postwar isolation for Spain as trade with most countries ceased. U.S. President Franklin Roosevelt, who had assured Franco that Spain would not suffer consequences from the Allies, died in April 1945. Roosevelt's successor, Harry S. Truman, as well as new Allied governments, were less friendly to Franco. A number of nations withdrew their ambassadors, and Spain was not admitted to the United Nations until 1955.

== Military ==
Although it sought to avoid entering the war, Spain did make plans for defense of the country. Initially, most of the Spanish Army was stationed in southern Spain in case of an Allied attack from Gibraltar during 1940 and 1941. However, Franco ordered a gradual redeployment to the Pyrenees mountains along the French border in case of a possible German invasion of Spain as Axis interest in Gibraltar grew. By the time it became clear that the Allies were gaining the upper hand in the conflict, Franco had massed all his troops on the French border and received personal assurances from the leaders of Allied countries that they did not wish to invade Spain.

=== Spanish Armed Forces during the war ===
At the end of the Civil War in April 1939, the Ministry of the Army and the Ministry of the Navy were reorganized, and the Ministry of the Air Force was established. The Captaincies General were reestablished, based on eight Army Corps in the peninsula and two in Morocco. In 1943, the IX Military Region (Granada) and the First Armored Division (20 August 1943) were created within the General Reserve.

At the end of the Civil War, the Spanish (Francoist) Army counted with 1,020,500 men, in 60 Divisions. During the first year of peace, Franco dramatically reduced the size of the Spanish Army to 250,000 in early 1940, with most soldiers two-year conscripts. A few weeks after the end of the war, the eight traditional Military Regions (Madrid, Sevilla, Valencia, Barcelona, Zaragoza, Burgos, Valladolid, and the VIII Military Region at A Coruña) were reestablished. In 1944 the IX Military Region, with its headquarters in Granada, was created. The Air Force became an independent service, under its own Ministry of the Air Force.

Concerns about the international situation, Spain's possible entry into the Second World War, and threats of invasion led Franco to undo some of these reductions. In November 1942, with the Allied landings in North Africa and the German occupation of Vichy France bringing hostilities closer than ever to Spain's border, Franco ordered a partial mobilization, bringing the army to over 750,000 men. The Air Force and Navy also grew in numbers and in budgets, to 35,000 airmen and 25,000 sailors by 1945, although for fiscal reasons Franco had to restrain attempts by both services to undertake dramatic expansions.

During the Second World War, the Army in metropolitan Spain had eight Army Corps, with two or three Infantry Divisions each. Additionally, the Army of Africa had two Army Corps in Northern Africa, and there were the Canary Islands General Command and the Balearic Islands General Command, one Cavalry Division, plus the Artillery's General Reserve. In 1940 a Reserve Group, with three Divisions, was created.

Accustomed to a fixed-position war, without major strategic changes, the Spanish Army lacked the operational mobility of the armored units of large European armies, as well as experience in combined tank-infantry operations. The most modern tanks used in the Civil War had been the Russian T-26, the German Panzer I and various Fiat Italian tanks, already out of date by 1940.

On the main ships of the Spanish Navy; of the six cruisers, only four were operational: the flagship, the heavy cruiser Canarias, the light cruiser Navarra, the light cruiser Almirante Cervera, and the obsolete Méndez Núñez. The other two, the cruiser Galicia and the cruiser Miguel de Cervantes (both Cervera class), were in shipyards, without crew, undergoing refitting. The destroyers were of the Churruca classes and Alsedo classes. Some surviving ships included a few submarines which were C class and some Archimede class.

The Spanish Air Force had a few hundred fighters, mainly of Italian or German manufacture: Fiat C.R.32, Heinkel He 112, Messerschmitt Bf 109, Fiat G.50 and Heinkel He 51. Among the bombers, the SM.79, SM.81, Junkers Ju 52, Heinkel He 111, Dornier Do 17 and Fiat BR.20. In addition, it owned Soviet-made aircraft, mainly Polikarpov I-15 and Polikarpov I-16, used in the civil war by republican aviation.

At the end of the Second World War in 1945, the Spanish Army had 300,000 enlisted men, 25,000 non-commissioned officers and 25,000 chiefs and officers in the Army. Their weapons were by now very obsolete, due to the rapid technological evolution that had occurred by the Allied and Axis armies during the war.

Some pictures of Spanish Armed Forces of that time

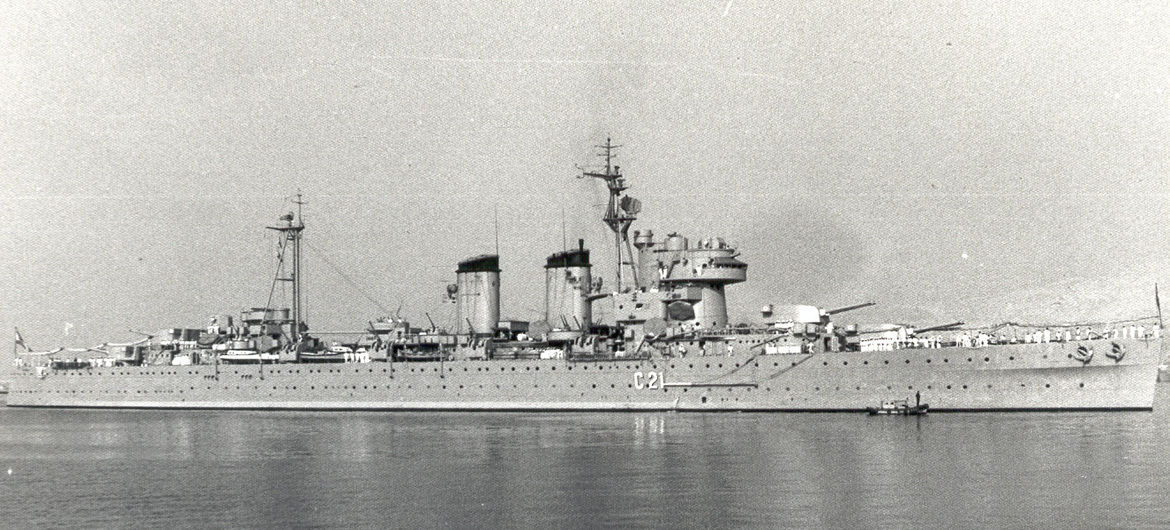
Heavy cruiser Canarias, flagship of the Spanish Navy in these years.

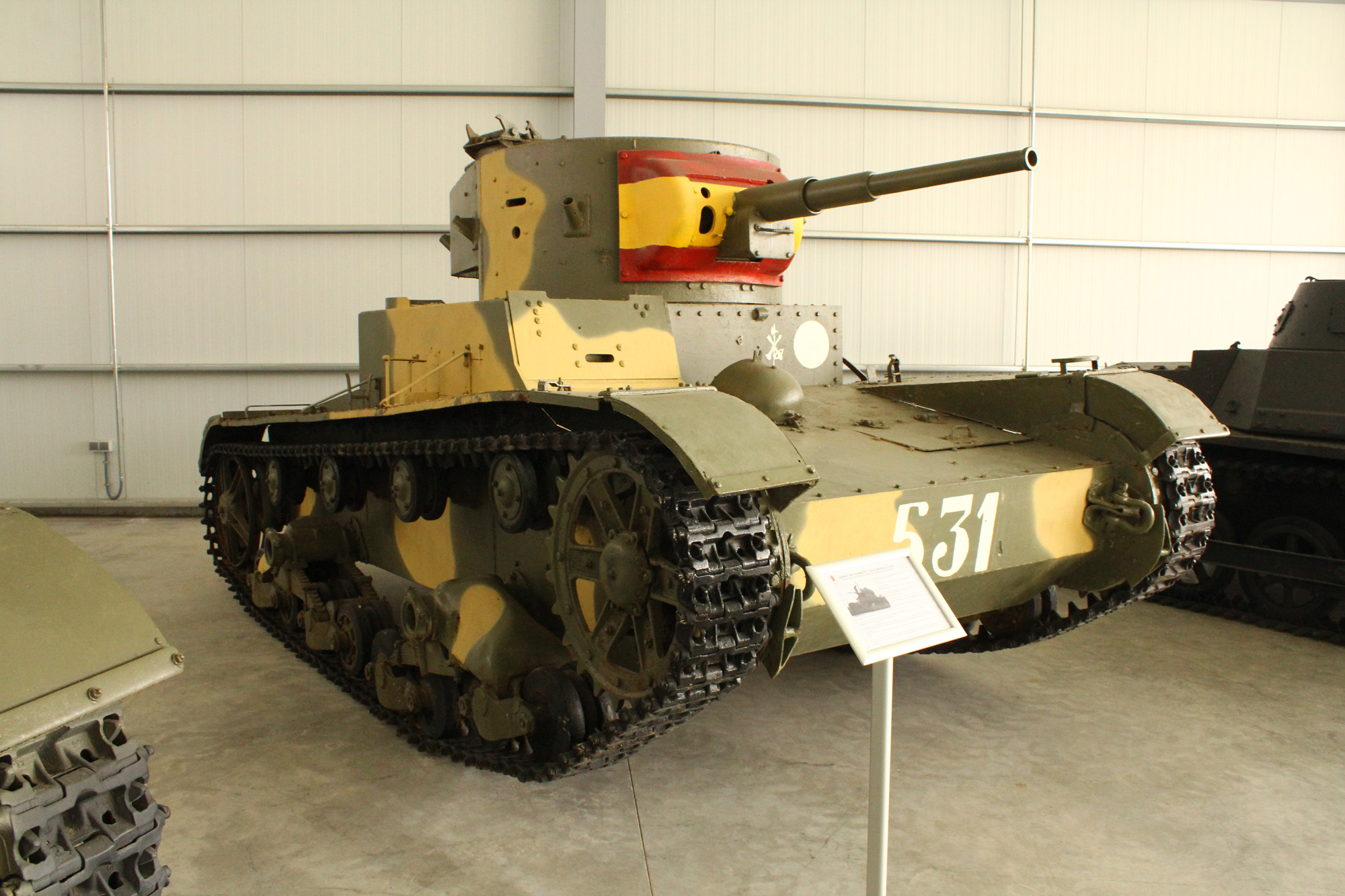
T-26, the most powerful and numerous tank of the Spanish Army at the time.

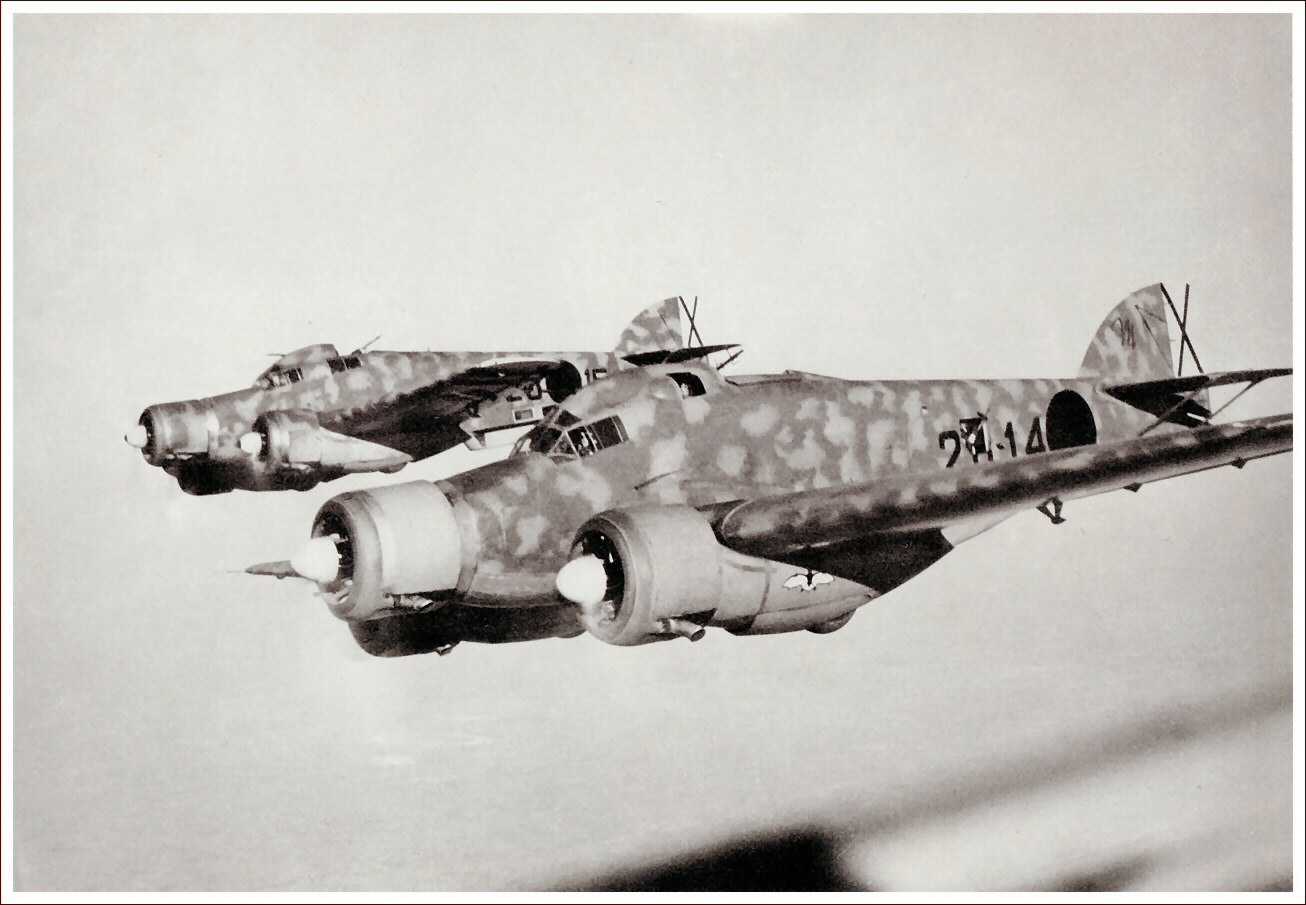
Savoia-Marchetti SM.79, the most numerous bomber of the Spanish Air Force at the time.

=== Operation Felix ===
Invasion plans of Nazi Germany and probable routes of British invasion

Before Franco and Hitler's October 1940 meeting in Hendaye, there had been Spanish-German planning for an attack on the British territory of Gibraltar from Spain. At the time, Gibraltar, a British dependency and military base, was important for control of the western exit from the Mediterranean and the sea routes to the Suez Canal and Middle East. The Germans also appreciated the strategic importance of north-west Africa for bases and as a route for any future American involvement. Therefore, the plans included the occupation of the region by substantial German forces, to forestall any future Allied invasion attempt.

The plan, Operation Felix, was developed in detail before the negotiations at Hendaye failed. By March 1941, military resources were being ear-marked for Operation Barbarossa and the Soviet Union. Operation Felix-Heinrich was an amended form of Felix that would be invoked once certain objectives in Russia had been achieved. In the event, these conditions were not fulfilled and Franco still held back from entering the war.

After the war, Field Marshal Wilhelm Keitel said: "Instead of attacking Russia, we should have strangled the British Empire by closing the Mediterranean. The first step in the operation would have been the conquest of Gibraltar. That was another great opportunity we missed." If that had succeeded, Hermann Göring proposed that Germany "offer Britain the right to resume peaceful traffic through the Mediterranean if she came to terms with Germany and joined us in a war against Russia".

As the war progressed and the tide turned against the Axis, the Germans planned for an Allied attack through Spain. There were three successive plans, progressively less aggressive, as German capability waned.

=== Operation Isabella ===
This was planned in May 1941 as a reaction to a proposed British landing on the Iberian peninsula near Gibraltar. German troops would then advance into Spain to support Franco and expel the British wherever they landed.

=== Operation Ilona or Gisella ===
Ilona was a scaled down version of Isabella, subsequently renamed Gisella. Devised in May 1942, to be invoked whether or not Spain stayed neutral. Ten German divisions would advance to Barcelona and, if necessary, towards Salamanca to support the Spanish army in fighting another proposed Allied landing either from the Mediterranean or Atlantic coasts.

=== Operation Nurnberg ===
Devised in June 1943, Nurnberg was purely a defensive operation in the Pyrenees along both sides of the Spanish-French border in the event of Allied landings in the Iberian peninsula, which were to repel an Allied advance from Spain into France.

== Resupply of German submarines ==
Sources differ and list 25 or 26 cases of German U-boats replenished in Spanish ports taking place between January 1940 and February 1944: five in 1940, 16 in 1941, two or three in 1942, none in 1943, and possibly one in 1944. Most were scheduled operations and 3 were emergency cases. The ports used were Vigo (7–8), Las Palmas (6), Cádiz (6) and Ferrol (5). Overall, there were 1,508 tons of gas-oil and 37.1 tons of heavy oil supplied to U-boats. In most cases lubricants, water and food were also delivered, and in some cases navigation charts and first-aid kits were supplied. In three cases, torpedoes were supplied. In a few cases injured or sick German sailors were taken off of boats.

Almost all cases were overnight operations, although two emergency repairs took a few days. There were four German supply ships (Thalia, Bessel, Max Albrecht and Corrientes) involved. In one case the replenishment operation was abandoned, as it turned out that the submarine in question was damaged and unfit for the process. The Corrientes was the target of a limpet mine attack while at port in Las Palmas on 9 May 1940, but the damage was minor and she was back in service a few weeks later.

== Occupation of Tangier ==
Spanish troops occupied the Tangier International Zone on 14 June 1940, the same day Paris fell to the Germans. Despite calls by the writer Rafael Sánchez Mazas and other Spanish nationalists to annex Tangier, the Franco regime publicly considered the occupation a temporary wartime measure. A diplomatic dispute between Britain and Spain over the latter's abolition of the city's international institutions in November 1940 led to a further guarantee of British rights and a Spanish promise not to fortify the area. In May 1944, although it had served as a contact point between him and the later Axis Powers during the Spanish Civil War, Franco expelled all German diplomats from the area.

The territory was restored to its pre-war status on 11 October 1945. In July 1952 the protecting powers met at Rabat to discuss the Zone's future, agreeing to abolish it. Tangier joined with the rest of Morocco following the restoration of full sovereignty in 1956.

== Volunteers ==
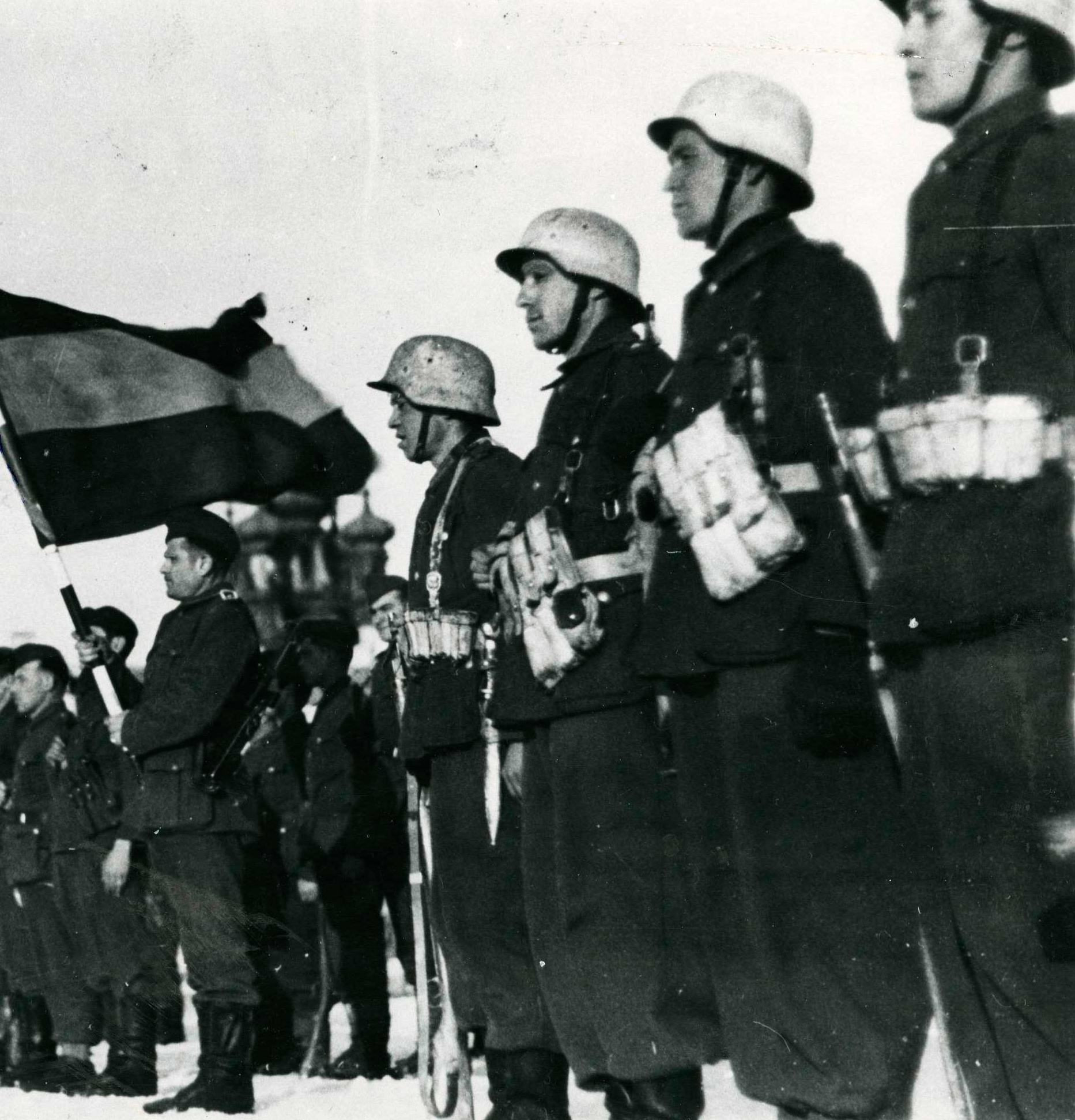
Spanish volunteers at an official act

The main part of Spain's involvement in the war was through volunteers. They fought for both sides, largely reflecting the allegiances of the civil war.

=== Spanish volunteers in Axis service ===
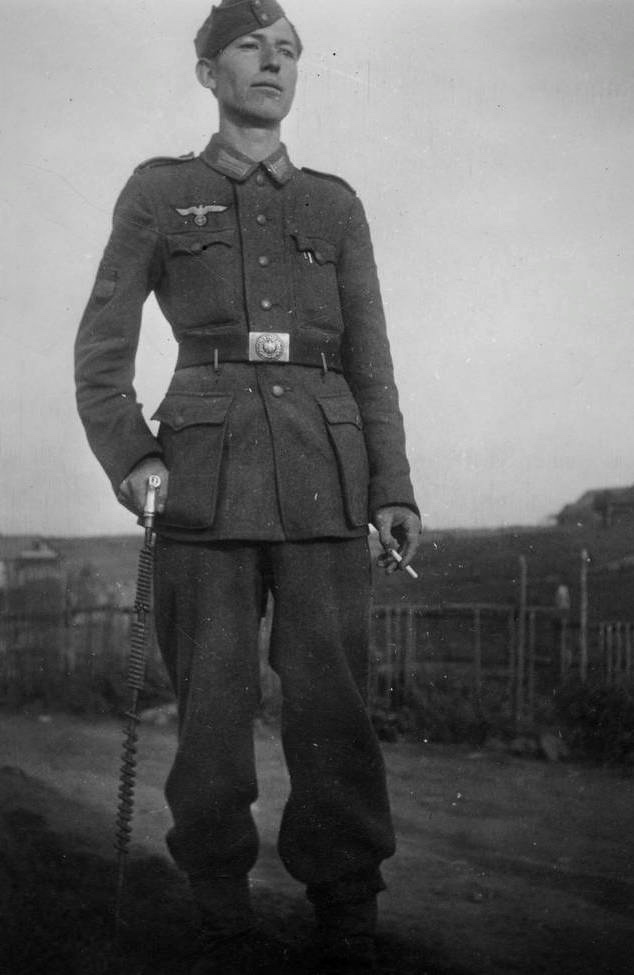
A Spanish volunteer of the Blue Division

Although Franco did not bring Spain into World War II on the side of the Axis, he permitted volunteers to join the German Army on the clear and guaranteed condition they would fight against Bolshevism (Soviet Communism) on the Eastern Front, and not against the western Allies. In this manner, he could keep Spain at peace with the western Allies, while repaying German support during the Spanish Civil War and providing an outlet for the strong anti-Communist sentiments of many Spanish nationalists. Spanish foreign minister Ramón Serrano Súñer suggested raising a volunteer corps, and at the commencement of Operation Barbarossa, Franco sent an official offer of help to Berlin.

Hitler approved the use of Spanish volunteers on 24 June 1941. Volunteers flocked to recruiting offices in all the metropolitan areas of Spain. Cadets from the officer training school in Zaragoza volunteered in particularly large numbers. Initially, the Spanish government was prepared to send about 4,000 men, but soon realized that there were more than enough volunteers to fill an entire division: – the Blue Division or División Azul under Agustín Muñoz Grandes – including an air force squadron – the Blue Squadron, 18,104 men in all, with 2,612 officers and 15,492 soldiers.

The Blue Division was trained in Germany before serving in the Siege of Leningrad, and notably at the Battle of Krasny Bor, where General Infantes' 6,000 Spanish soldiers threw back some 30,000 Soviet troops. In August 1942, it was transferred north to the southeastern flank of the Siege of Leningrad, just south of the Neva near Pushkin, Kolpino and Krasny Bor in the Izhora River area. After the collapse of the German southern front following the Battle of Stalingrad, more German troops were deployed southwards. By this time, General Emilio Esteban Infantes had taken command. The Blue Division faced a major Soviet attempt to break the siege of Leningrad in February 1943, when the 55th Army of the Soviet forces, reinvigorated after the victory at Stalingrad, attacked the Spanish positions at the Battle of Krasny Bor, near the main Moscow-Leningrad road. Despite very heavy casualties, the Spaniards were able to hold their ground against a Soviet force seven times larger and supported by tanks. The assault was contained and the siege of Leningrad was maintained for a further year. The division remained on the Leningrad front where it continued to suffer heavy casualties owing to weather and enemy action. In October 1943, with Spain under severe diplomatic pressure, the Blue Division was ordered home leaving a token force until March 1944. In all, about 45,000 Spaniards, mostly committed volunteers, served on the Eastern Front, and around 4,500 died. Soviet leader Joseph Stalin's desire to retaliate against Franco by making heavy sanctions of Spain and provide support to democratic forces, with the intent of destroying the regime from the inside, the first order of business at the Potsdam Conference in July 1945, was not supported by Harry S. Truman and Winston Churchill. Truman and Churchill persuaded Stalin to settle instead for a full trade embargo against Spain.

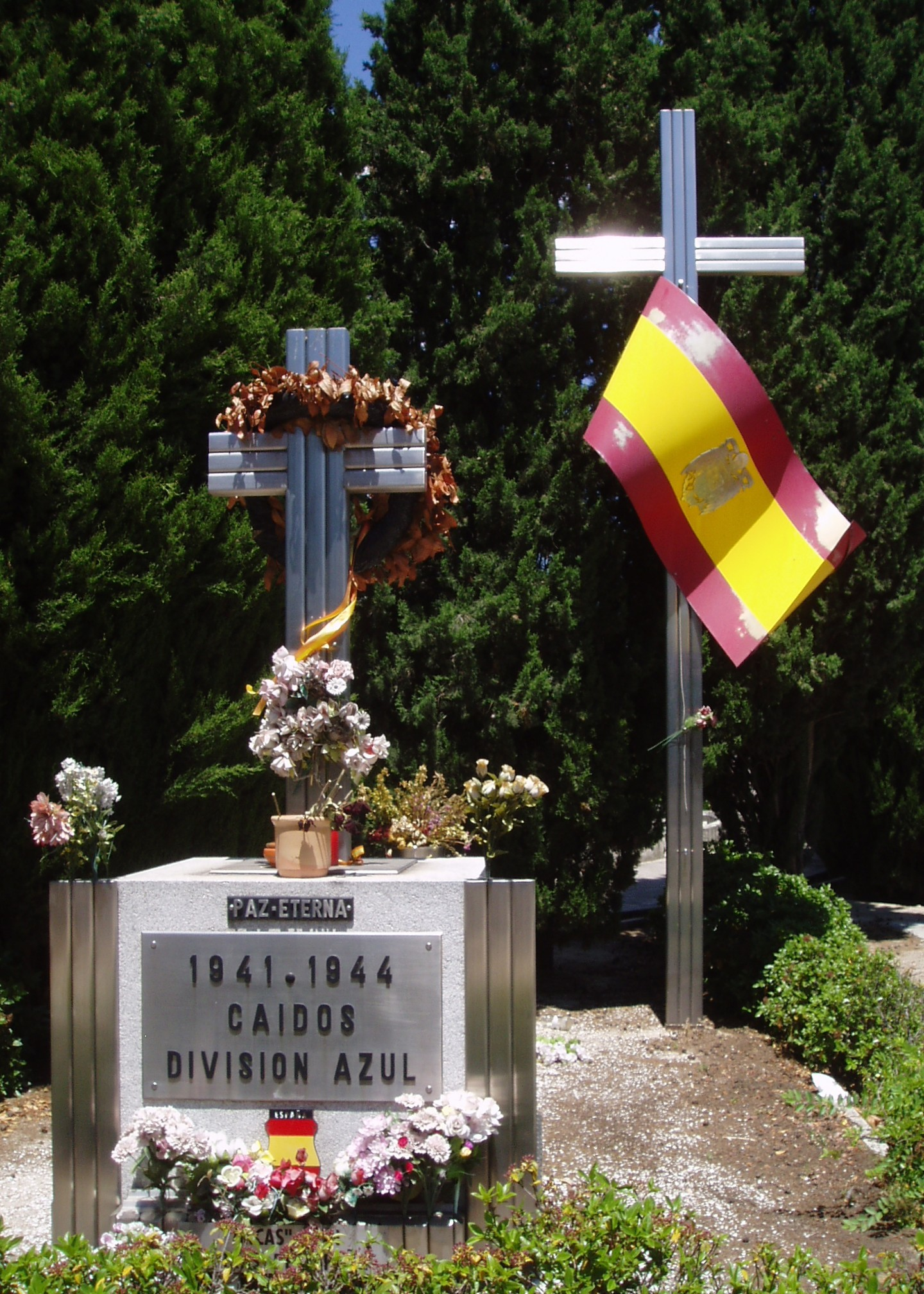
Memorial of the Blue Division at La Almudena Cemetery, Madrid

372 members of the Blue Division, the Blue Legion, or volunteers of the Spanische-Freiwilligen Kompanie der SS 101, were taken prisoner by the victorious Red Army; 286 of these men were kept in captivity until 2 April 1954, when they returned to Spain aboard the ship Semiramis, supplied by the International Red Cross.

=== Spanish volunteers in Allied service ===
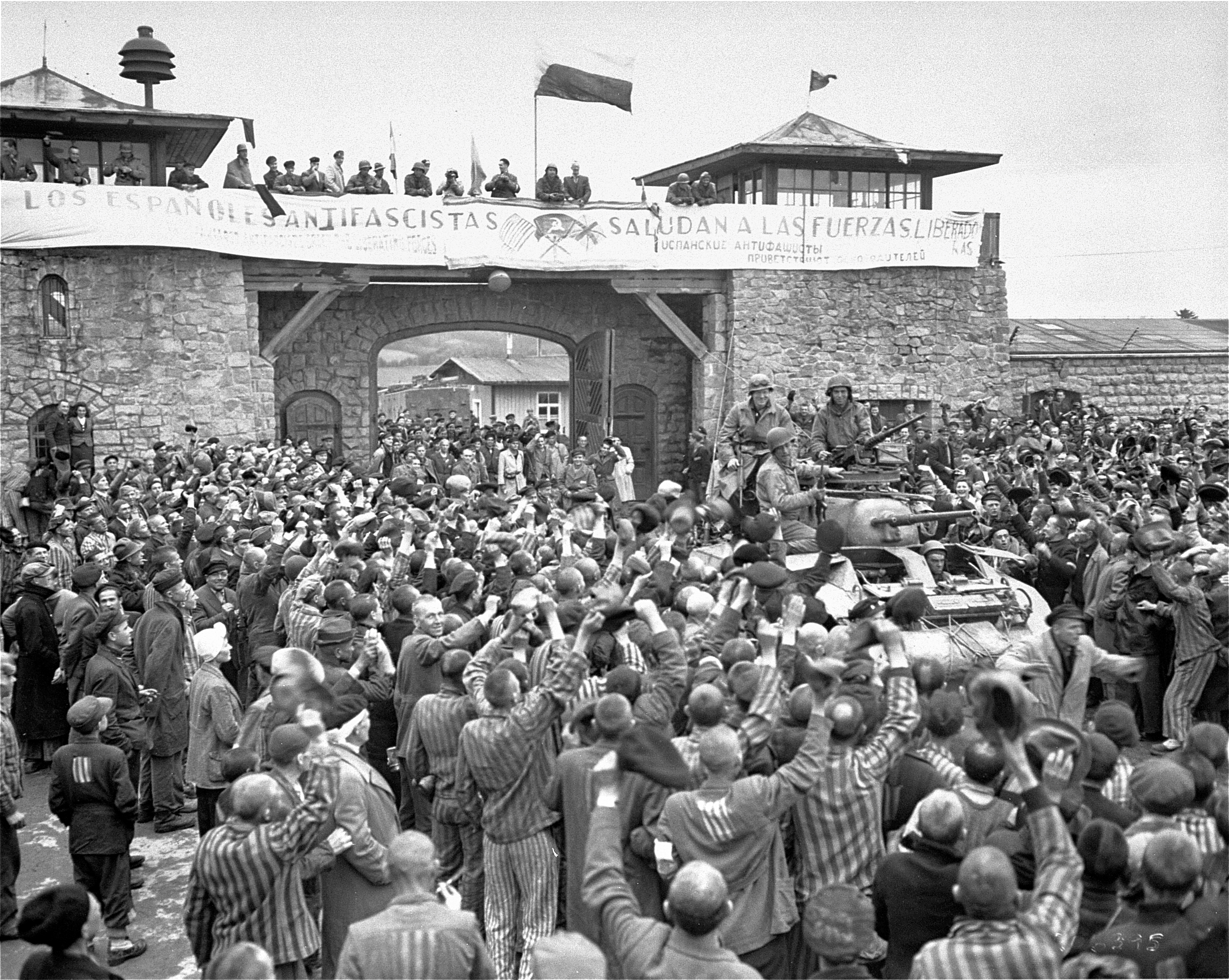
An M8 Greyhound armored car of the US Army's 11th Armored Division entering the Mauthausen concentration camp. The banner in the background (in Spanish) reads as "Anti-fascist Spaniards salute the forces of liberation".

After their defeat in the Spanish Civil War, large numbers of Republican veterans and civilians went into exile in France; the French Republic interned them in refugee camps, such as Camp Gurs in southern France. To improve their conditions, many joined the French Foreign Legion at the start of World War II, making up a sizeable proportion of it. Around sixty thousand joined the French Resistance, mostly as guerrillas, with some also continuing the fight against Francisco Franco. Several thousand more joined the Free French Forces and fought against the Axis Powers. Some sources have claimed that as many as 2,000 served in General Leclerc's Second French Division, many of them from the former Durruti Column. (Note: The number of Spaniards that served in the Second French Armoured Division in World War II remains disputed. The official French Annuaire des anciens combattants de la 2e DB, Imprimerie de Arrault, 1949 claimed there were less than 300 Spaniards.)

The 9th Armoured Company comprised almost entirely battle-hardened Spanish veterans; it became the first Allied military unit to enter Paris upon its liberation in August 1944, where it met up with Spanish Maquis fighting alongside French resistance fighters. Furthermore, 1,000 Spanish Republicans served in the 13th Demi-Brigade of the Foreign Legion.

In Eastern Europe, the Soviet Union received former Communist Spanish leaders and child evacuees from Republican families. When Germany invaded the Soviet Union in 1941, many, such as communist General Enrique Líster, joined the Red Army. According to Beevor, 700 Spanish Republicans served in the Red Army and another 700 operated as partisans behind the German lines. Individual Spaniards, such as the double-agent Juan Pujol García (code name GARBO), also worked for the Allied cause.

== Bribes by MI6 ==
According to a 2008 book, Winston Churchill authorised millions of dollars in bribes to Spanish generals in an effort to influence General Franco against entering the war on the side of Germany. In May 2013 files were released showing MI6 spent the present-day equivalent of more than $200 million bribing senior Spanish military officers, ship owners and other agents to keep Spain out of the war.

== Resources and trade ==
Despite lacking cash, oil and other supplies, Francoist Spain was able to supply some essential materials to Germany. There was a series of secret war-time trade agreements between the two countries. The principal resource was wolfram (or tungsten) ore from German-owned mines in Galicia, northwestern Spain. Tungsten was essential to Germany for its advanced precision engineering and therefore for armament production. Despite Allied attempts to buy all available supplies, which rocketed in price, and diplomatic efforts to influence Spain, supplies to Germany continued until August 1944.

Payment for wolfram was effectively set against the Spanish debt to Germany. Other minerals included iron ore, zinc, lead and mercury. Spain also acted as a conduit for goods from South America, for example, industrial diamonds and platinum. After the war, evidence was found of significant gold transactions between Germany and Spain, ceasing only in May 1945. It was believed that these were derived from Nazi looting of occupied lands, but attempts by the Allies to obtain control of the gold and return it were largely frustrated.

== Espionage and sabotage ==
As long as Spain permitted it, the Abwehr – the German intelligence organisation – was able to operate in Spain and Spanish Morocco, often with cooperation of the Nationalist government. Gibraltar's installations were a prime target for sabotage, using sympathetic anti-British Spanish workers. One such attack occurred in June 1943, when a bomb caused a fire and explosions in the dockyard. The British were generally more successful after this and managed to use turned agents and sympathetic anti-Fascist Spaniards to uncover subsequent attacks. A total of 43 sabotage attempts were prevented in this way. By January 1944, a Gibraltarian and two Spanish workers, convicted of attempted sabotage, had been executed.

The Abwehr also financed, trained and equipped saboteurs to attack British naval assets. The Germans contacted a Spanish Army staff officer from Campo de Gibraltar, Lieutenant Colonel Eleuterio Sánchez Rubio, member of Falange and coordinator of the intelligence operations in the Campo, to establish a network of saboteurs with access to Gibraltar. Sánchez Rubio designated Emilio Plazas Tejera, also a member of Falange, as operations chief of the organisation. The Spanish agents sank the armed trawler HMT Erin, and destroyed the auxiliary minesweeper HMT Honju, which resulted in the deaths of six British seamen on 18 January 1942, among them an officer from HMS Argus. Plazas was assisted by the Spanish naval commander of Puente Mayorga, Manuel Romero Hume, who allowed him to beach a rowboat there.

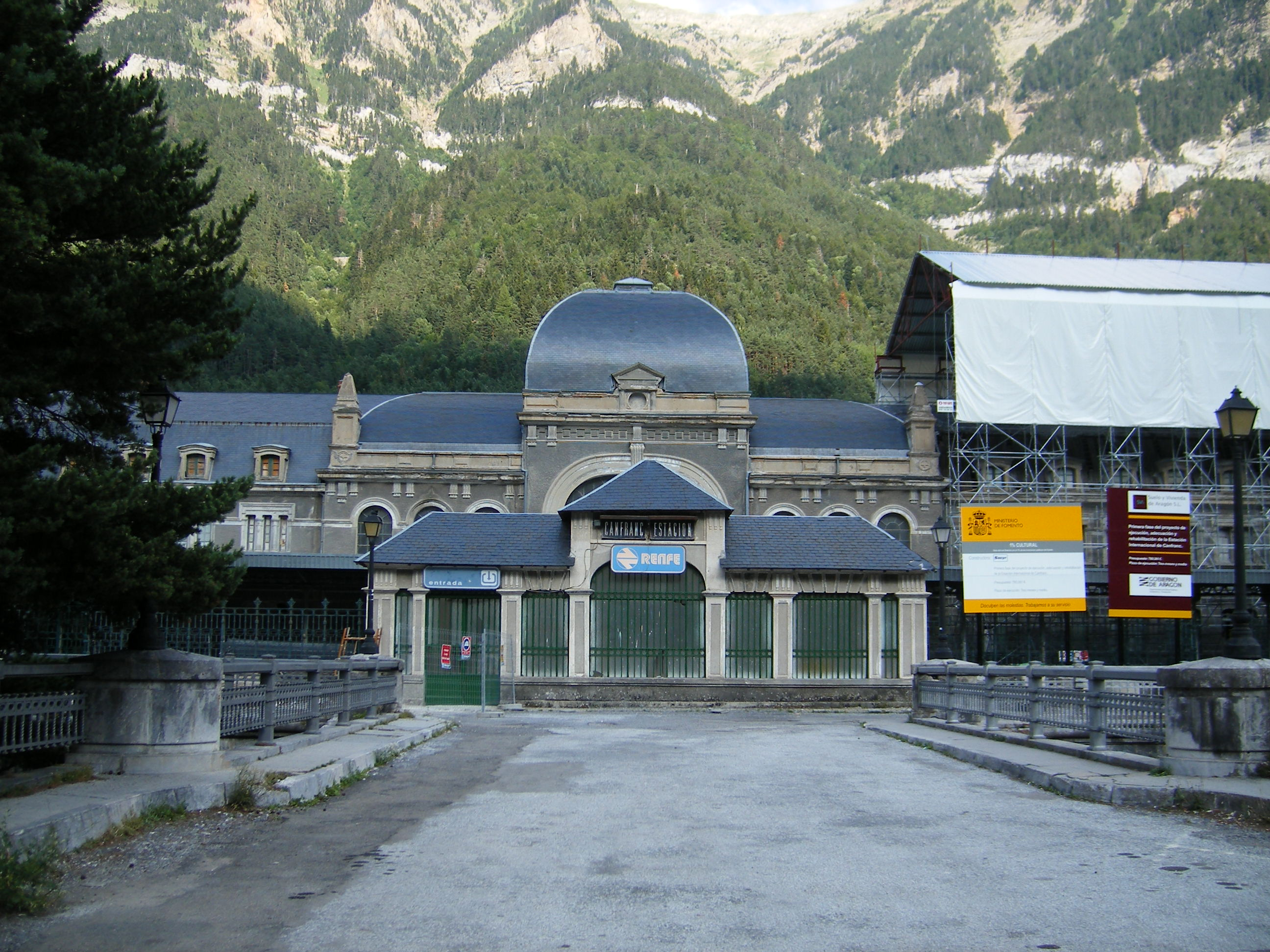
The international station of Canfranc

The Abwehr also maintained observation posts along both sides of the Straits of Gibraltar, reporting on shipping movements. A German agent in Cádiz was the target of a successful Allied disinformation operation, Operation Mincemeat, prior to the invasion of Sicily in 1943. In early 1944, the situation changed. The Allies were clearly gaining the advantage over the Axis and one double agent had provided enough information for Britain to make a detailed protest to the Spanish government. As a result, the Spanish government declared its "strict neutrality". The Abwehr operation in southern Spain was consequently closed down. The rail station of Canfranc was the conduit for the smuggling of people and information from Vichy France to the British consulate in San Sebastián. The nearer border station of Irún could not be used as it bordered occupied France.

== Jews and other refugees ==
In the first years of the war, "Laws regulating [the admittance of Jews] were written and mostly ignored." The Jews who came to Spain were mainly from Western Europe, fleeing deportation to concentration camps from occupied France, but also Jews from Eastern Europe, especially Hungary. Trudi Alexy refers to the "absurdity" and "paradox of refugees fleeing the Nazis' Final Solution to seek asylum in a country where no Jews had been allowed to live openly as Jews for over four centuries."

Throughout World War II, Spanish diplomats of the Franco government extended their protection to Eastern European Jews, especially in Hungary. Jews claiming Spanish ancestry were provided with Spanish documentation without being required to prove their case and either left for Spain or survived the war with the help of their new legal status in occupied countries.

Once the tide of war began to turn, and Count Francisco Gómez-Jordana Sousa succeeded Franco's brother-in-law Serrano Súñer as Spain's foreign minister, Spanish diplomacy became "more sympathetic to Jews", although Franco himself "never said anything" about this. Around that same time, a contingent of Spanish doctors travelling in Poland were fully informed of the Nazi extermination plans by Governor-General Hans Frank, who was under the misimpression that they would share his views about the matter; when they came home, they passed the story to Admiral Luís Carrero Blanco, who told Franco.

Diplomats discussed the possibility of Spain as a route to a containment camp for Jewish refugees near Casablanca, but it came to naught without Free French and British support. Nonetheless, control of the Spanish border with France relaxed somewhat at this time, and thousands of Jews managed to cross into Spain (many by smugglers' routes). Almost all of them survived the war. The American Jewish Joint Distribution Committee operated openly in Barcelona.

Shortly afterwards, Spain began giving citizenship to Sephardic Jews in Greece, Hungary, Bulgaria, and Romania; many Ashkenazic Jews also managed to be included, as did some non-Jews. The Spanish head of mission in Budapest, Ángel Sanz Briz, saved thousands of Ashkenazim in Hungary by granting them Spanish citizenship, placing them in safe houses and teaching them minimal Spanish so they could pretend to be Sephardim, at least to someone who did not know Spanish. The Spanish diplomatic corps was performing a balancing act: Alexy conjectures that the number of Jews they took in was limited by how much German hostility they were willing to engender.

Toward the war's end, Sanz Briz had to flee Budapest, leaving these Jews open to arrest and deportation. An Italian diplomat, Giorgio Perlasca, who was himself living under Spanish protection, used forged documents to persuade the Hungarian authorities that he was the new Spanish Ambassador. As such, he continued Spanish protection of Hungarian Jews until the Red Army arrived.

Although Spain effectively undertook more to help Jews escape deportation to the concentration camps than most neutral countries did, there has been debate about Spain's wartime attitude towards refugees. Franco's regime, despite its aversion to Zionism and "Judeo"-Freemasonry, does not appear to have shared the rabid anti-Semitic ideology promoted by the Nazis. About 25,000 to 35,000 refugees, mainly Jews, were allowed to transit through Spain to Portugal and beyond.

Some historians argue that these facts demonstrate a humane attitude by Franco's regime, while others point out that the regime only permitted Jewish transit through Spain. After the war, Franco's regime was quite hospitable to those who had been responsible for the deportation of the Jews, notably Louis Darquier de Pellepoix, Commissioner for Jewish Affairs (May 1942 – February 1944) under the Vichy Régime in France, and to many other former Nazis, such as Otto Skorzeny and Léon Degrelle, and other former Fascists like Ante Pavelic.

José María Finat y Escrivá de Romaní, Franco's chief of security, issued an official order dated 13 May 1941 to all provincial governors requesting a list of all Jews, both local and foreign, present in their districts. After the list of six thousand names was compiled, Romaní was appointed Spain's ambassador to Germany, enabling him to deliver it personally to Himmler. Following the defeat of Germany in 1945, the Spanish government attempted to destroy all evidence of cooperation with the Nazis, but this official order survived.

== Japanese war reparations ==
At the end of the war, Japan was compelled to pay high amounts of money or goods to several nations to cover damage or injury inflicted during the war. In the case of Spain, the reparations were due to the deaths of over a hundred Spanish citizens, including several Catholic missionaries, and great destruction of Spanish properties in the former Spanish colony of the Philippines during the Japanese occupation. To that effect, in 1954 Japan concluded 54 bilateral agreements including one with Spain for $5.5 million, paid in 1957.

== See also ==
- List of Spanish military equipment of World War II
- Moscow Gold
- Spanish Maquis
- Laurel Incident
- Iberian Pact
- Portugal during World War II
- Neutral powers during World War II
- Spain during World War I

== Sources ==
- Bowen, Wayne H. (2000). Spaniards and Nazi Germany: Collaboration in the New Order. Columbia, MO: University of Missouri Press. p. 250. ISBN 978-0826213006. OCLC 44502380.
- Bowen, Wayne H. (2005). Spain During World War II. Columbia, MO: University of Missouri Press. p. 279. ISBN 978-0826216588. OCLC 64486498.
- Brenneis, Sara J.; Herrmann, Gina, eds. (2020). Spain, the Second World War, and the Holocaust: History and Representation. University of Toronto Press. ISBN 978-1487505707.
- Hayes, Carlton J. H. Wartime mission in Spain, 1942–1945 (1945) ISBN 978-1121497245. by the U.S. ambassador
- León-Aguinaga, Pablo. "The Trouble with Propaganda: the Second World War, Franco's Spain, and the Origins of US Post-War Public Diplomacy." International History Review 37.2 (2015): 342–365. doi:10.1080/07075332.2013.879916.
  online
- Mogaburo López, Fernando (2017). Historia Orgánica De Las Grandes Unidades (1475–2018) (PDF). Madrid: Ministerio de Defensa – Mando de Adiestramiento y Doctrina.
- Marquina, Antonio (1998). The Spanish Neutrality during the Second World War. American University International Law Review, 14(1), pp. 171–184.
- Payne, Stanley G (2008). Franco and Hitler. New Haven: Yale University Press. ISBN 978-0300122824.
- Payne, S.G. (1987). The Franco Regime, 1936–1975. Madison: University of Wisconsin. p. 238.
- Pike, David Wingeate (2000). Spaniards in the Holocaust: Mauthausen, Horror on the Danube. London: Routledge. p. 480. ISBN 0415227801.
- Preston, Paul. "Spain" in The Cambridge History of the Second World War: vol 2 (2015) pp. 301–323 doi:10.1017/CHO9781139524377.016
- Shulman, Milton (1995) [1947]. Defeat in the West. Chailey, East Sussex: Masquerade Publications. ISBN 1872947034.
- Thomàs, J. ed. Roosevelt and Franco During the Second World War: From the Spanish Civil War to Pearl Harbor (Springer, 2008).
