= Military Regions of Spain =

Former military administrative districts

The military regions of the Spanish Armed Forces were a administrative subdivision that existed in Spain from the 18th century to the end of the 20th century. They constituted a territorial subdivision in terms of the allocation of human and material resources for defence purposes, and responded to a territorial defence model (see es:Neutralidad armada, Armed Neutrality).

== Spanish Army ==
Spanish military regions were commanded by a captain general and the garrisons were made up of regiments, which were grouped into brigades and divisions, commanded by the respective generals. There were also auxiliary and non-combatant units (for example health, Quartermaster, etc.) and other combatant units not grouped into regiments and reporting directly to the captain general (for example, naval or air forces).

=== Origins ===
Military regions of Spain after the 1841 reforms.

In 1492, the Catholic Monarchs created the first captaincy general of Castile in the recently conquered Kingdom of Granada. This would later lead to the creation of the military regions. During the reign of Felipe V of Spain the old figure of Captain General, responsible for the royal army present in his jurisdiction, was revitalized.

The division of Spain into captaincies general dates from 1705, when they adjusted to the old kingdoms that constituted the Hispanic Monarchy. They were thirteen regions: Andalusia, Aragon, Burgos, Canary Islands, Castilla la Vieja, Catalonia, Extremadura, Galicia, Coast of Granada, Guipúzcoa, Mallorca, Navarra and Valencia. In 1714 the Captaincy General of Castilla la Nueva was created from the General Commissariat of the War People of Madrid.

In 1898 the peninsular territory was reduced to seven new military regions, while at the same time that the General Command of Balearic Islands, Canary Islands, Ceuta and Melilla. In 1907 the captaincies general were restructured, receiving the name of military regions.

=== Second Republic ===
During the Second Spanish Republic, one of the military reforms of the politician and minister Manuel Azaña suppressed the military regions, creating instead the organic divisions commanded by a major general.

=== Francoism ===
At the end of the Civil War, the Spanish (Francoist) Army numbered 1,020,500 men, in 60 Divisions. During the first year of peace, Franco dramatically reduced the size of the Army to 250,000 in early 1940, with most soldiers two-year conscripts.

After the establishment of the Franco dictatorship, through the Decree of 4 July 1939 of the Ministry of National Defence the administrative division of military regions and their scope were officially established. The eight traditional Military Regions (Madrid, Sevilla, Valencia, Barcelona, Zaragoza, Burgos, Valladolid, La Coruña) were reestablished. In 1944 a ninth Military Region, with its headquarters in Granada, was created. In 1959 it would be raised to the same rank as the others and its commander raised to lieutenant general (for organic reasons, the command had until then been conferred on a division general, with the title and powers of captain general), at the same time that it would also integrate the province of Jaén, until then dependent on the II Military Region. Thus, the following regions were established:

Military regions of Spain after the 1944 reforms.

Military regions of Spain after the 1960 reforms.

Military Regions of Spain (1939–1984)

Region No.	Coat of Arms	Region Details
I		I Military Region, captaincy general of Madrid.
II		II Military Region, captaincy general of Seville.
III		III Military Region, captaincy general of Valencia.
IV		IV Military Region, captaincy general of Barcelona.
V		V Military Region, Captaincy General of Zaragoza.
VI		VI Military Region, Captaincy General of Burgos.
VII		VII Military Region, Captaincy General of Valladolid.
VIII		VIII Military Region, Captaincy General of La Coruña.
IX		IX Military Region, Captaincy General of Granada.

The Ninth Military Region was not created in 1939. Due to the Allied landings in North Africa, Operation Torch, in November 1942, the creation of the IX Military Region was established to reorganize the forces in the area. For this purpose, it was established as a segregation of the II Military Region and with General Captaincy in Granada, on 1 March 1944.

==== 1965 reorganization ====
After the failure of the pentomic reorganization of 1958 (American-inspired structuring of pentomic divisions, which were divided into five "combat groups" that could act independently), as it was based on American doctrine but did not have its human, material and financial resources, the Spanish Army undertook a new reorganization in 1965, inspired by French military doctrine, and with a marked regionalizing profile. From an operational point of view, the Army units were organized into:

Units of the FII.

DAC-1.

DIM-2.

DIMT-3.

BRC Jarama I.

BRIPAC.

BRIAT.

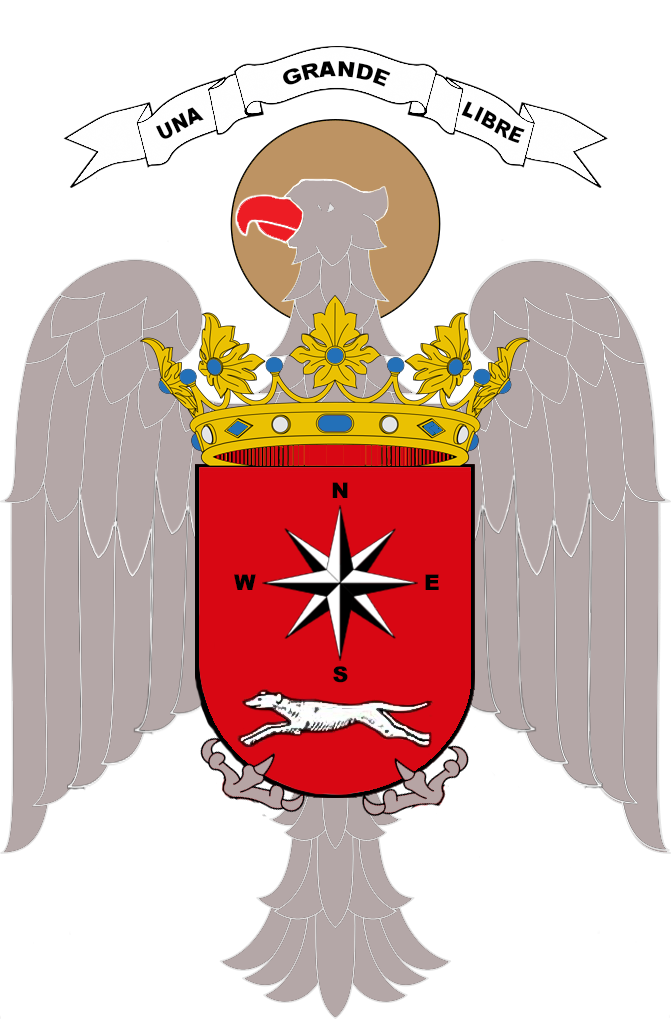
BRIR.

BRARTCE.

- Immediate Intervention Forces (FII), were prepared to be projected to the European scenario as allies of NATO against the Warsaw Pact. Their preparation and armament were oriented to conventional warfare, and they had limited defence capacity against nuclear weapons. Depending on the type of unit and their territorial deployment, they were maintained at between 70% (in the case of Divisions) and 100% (in the case of Brigades) of their required strength. Formed by:
  - Armoured Division No. 1 "Brunete" (DAC-1) (I Military Region (Spain)).
  - Mechanised Infantry Division "Guzmán el Bueno" No. 2 (DIM-2) (II Military Region (Spain)).
  - Motorized Division Maestrazgo No. 3 (DIMT-3) (III Military Region).

These types of units provided the military regions in which they were stationed with enormous military power and strategic importance, since they were first-rate military units, well armed and powerful.

Simultaneously, in 1965, both the Reserve Infantry Brigade (BRIR), which would be based in the IX Military Region, and the Army Corps Artillery Brigade (BRARTCE), located in the VI Military Region, would be constituted and included within the FII, at the same time as the Cavalry Division, established after the Civil War, would be dissolved, also creating and including the Cavalry Brigade (BRC) Jarama I, mostly quartered in the VII Military Region. Shortly after, in December of that same year, the Parachute Brigade (BRIPAC) was created in the 1st Military Region, and in January 1966, in the 8th Military Region, the Airborne Brigade (which would also be included within the Immediate Intervention Forces), thus culminating this new process of reorganization of the Spanish Army.

- The Operational Territorial Defense Forces (DOT) were responsible for the defence of the military region where they were stationed and were designed to counter subversive warfare, infiltrations, and landings. Their functions included initial zone coverage, coastal and border defence, actions against hostile strongholds, guerrilla suppression, permanent defence of key areas and strategic points within the military region, implementation of extreme security and emergency measures, containment of serious riots and tumultuous demonstrations, and facilitating the mobilization and deployment of units when necessary. Their primary mission was the defence of the State, the Government, and the territory against internal enemies. They were under the direct command of the Captains General of the various military regions and, in peacetime, operated at 40-50% of their theoretical strength, with plans to supplement their numbers through the mobilization of reservists.

=== Democracy ===
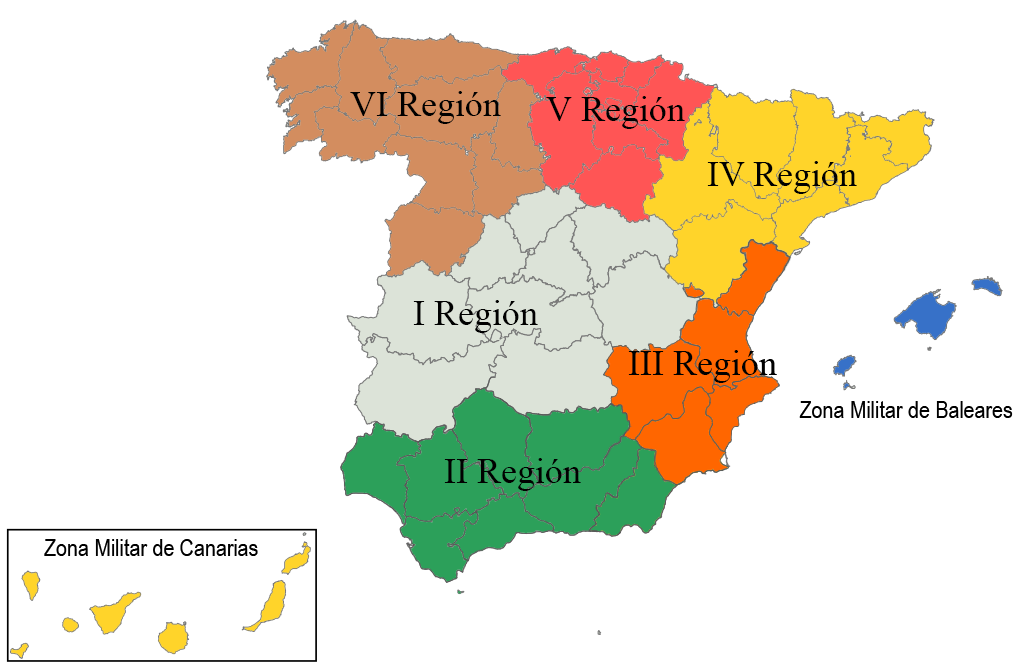
Military regions of Spain from 1984 onward.

After 1978, along with other extrapeninsular demarcations, the Spanish Army went from being divided from nine to six and four military regions. To this end, on 17 October 1984 the second (Seville) and ninth (Granada) were abolished, to constitute the Southern Military Region, in application of the decree of restructuring of the territorial organization for the Army, which was approved that same year.
