= Eusebio Calonge =

Spanish military officer of the Navy and politician

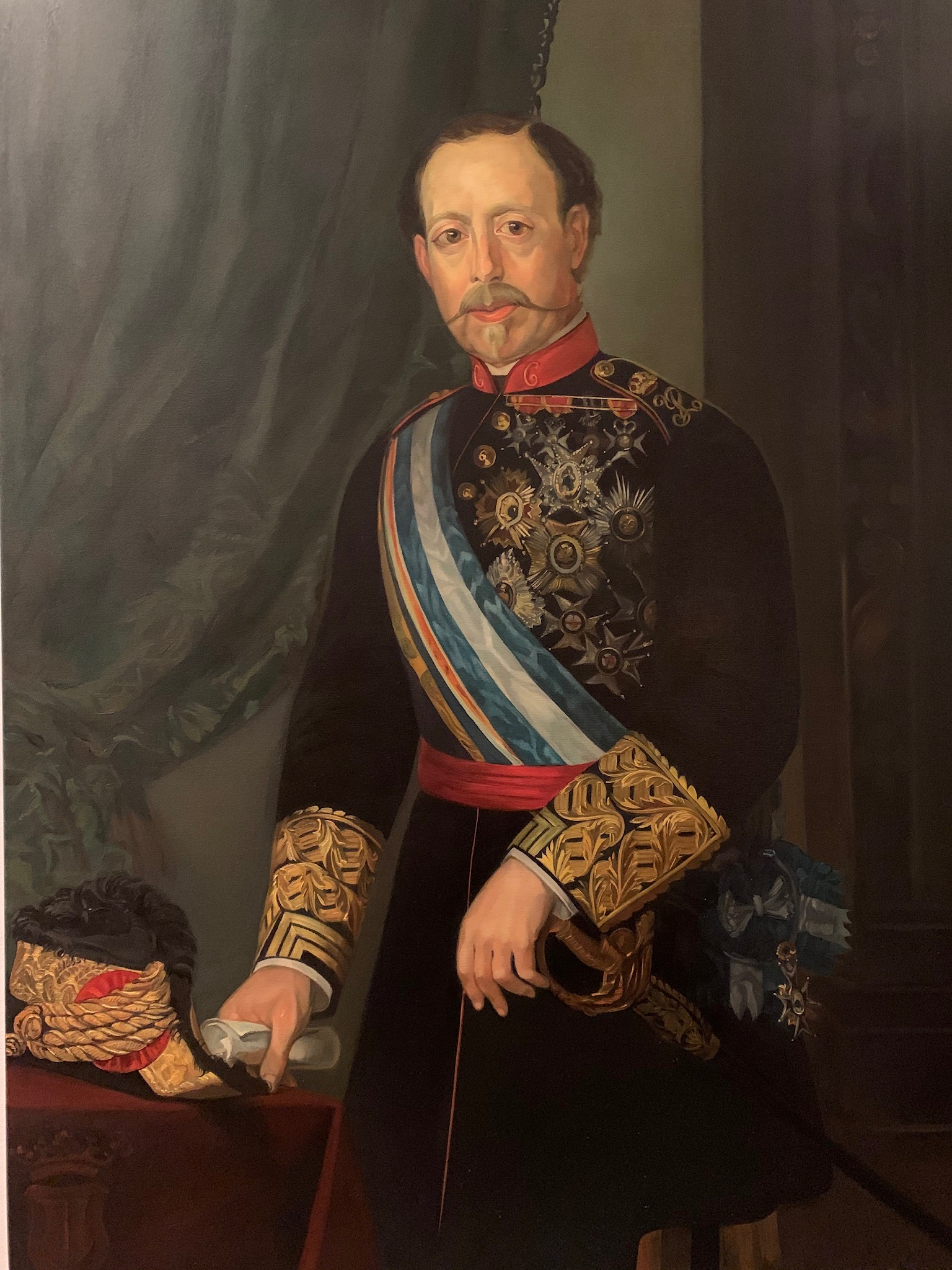

Senator for life of the Senate of Spain
- In office 1853–1868

Minister of State
- In office 13 July 1866 – 9 June 1867
- Monarch: Isabella II
- Prime Minister: Ramón María Narváez
- Preceded by: Lorenzo Arrazola
- Succeeded by: Alejandro de Castro

Minister of the Navy, Commerce and Overseas Governance of Spain
- In office 10 July – 13 July 1866
- Monarch: Isabella II
- Prime Minister: Ramón María Narváez

Personal details
- Born: Eusebio de Calonje y Fenollet; 15 December 1813 Vitoria, Spain
- Died: 28 October 1873 (aged 59) Madrid, Spain
- Party: Moderate Party
- Spouse: Joaquina García de Vicuña (m. 1840)

Military service
- Branch/service: Spanish Army; Spanish Navy
- Years of service: 1833–1873
- Rank: Lieutenant General
- Battles/wars: First Carlist War; Second Carlist War; Glorious Revolution

Eusebio de Calonje y Fenollet (15 December 1813 – 28 October 1873) was a Spanish military officer and politician of the Moderate Party. He served as Minister of State, Minister of the Navy, senator, deputy of Zaragoza, Almería and Teruel provinces as well as the Captain General of Aragon, Navarre and Canary Islands.

== Biography ==
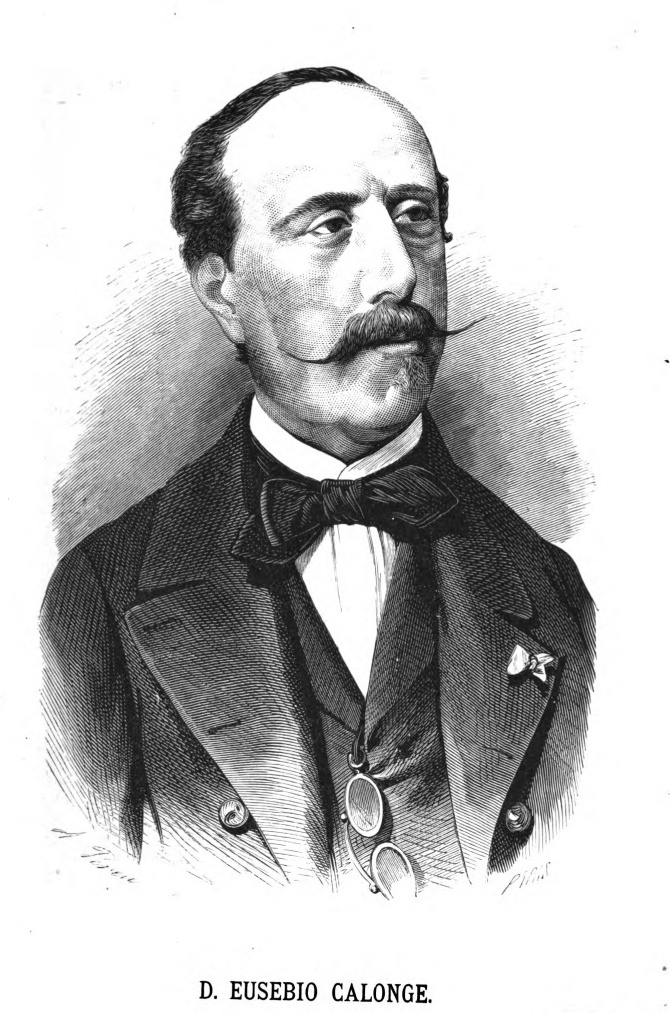
Eusebio de Calonje. Engraving by Marcelo París after a drawing by Alfredo Perea: Carlos Rubio, Historia filosófica de la revolución española de 1868, Madrid.

A military officer affiliated with the Moderate Party, he fought in the First Carlist War, reaching the rank of colonel. He was forced into exile during the regency of Baldomero Espartero. He returned to Spain in 1843 and served as a deputy in 1845, 1848, 1850, and 1853. Promoted to brigadier general of infantry in 1846, he held the Captaincy General of Navarre from 1852 to 1854. In 1866, he served as Minister of the Navy for three days and, later that year, as Minister of State until September 1867. At the outbreak of the Revolution of 1868, he was commander-in-chief of the armies of Old Castile, the Basque Country, Navarre, and Galicia. After the revolution's success, he was permitted to go to Portugal.

He returned to Spain in October 1870 and was reinstated in the army after swearing allegiance to the constitution, although he remained on reserve status. In 1871, he was condemned by a court-martial to the loss of his post and honors for refusing to swear allegiance to Amadeo of Savoy. After the abdication of Amadeo I and the proclamation of the republic, he declined to return to his post. He was a life senator from 1853 to 1868 and secretary of the chamber in 1858.

In March 1840 he married Joaquina García de Vicuña. They had a son, Eusebio de Calonje y García de Vicuña, who was also a military officer and reached the rank of brigadier general and captain of the Royal Corps of Halberdier Guards.

== Political positions ==
- Member of Parliament for the Province of Zaragoza (1845–1846)
- Member of Parliament for the Province of Almería (1848–1850)
- Member of Parliament for the Province of Teruel (1850–1851)
- Captain General of the Canary Islands (1852)
- Captain General of Navarre (1852–1854)
- Captain General of Aragon (1867)

== Distinctions ==
- Laureate Cross of Saint Ferdinand (1848)
- Order of Isabella the Catholic (1850)
- Grand Cross of the Order of Saint Hermenegild (1860)
- Grand Cross of the Order of Charles III (1864)
- Grand Cross of the Order of the Tower and Sword (1867)
- Order of Naval Merit (1867)

Political offices
Preceded by Juan Zavala De La Puente	Minister of the Navy, Commerce and Overseas Governance of Spain; 10 July – 13 July 1866	Succeeded by Joaquín Gutiérrez Rubalcaba Casal
Preceded by Lorenzo Arrazola	Minister of State; 13 July 1866 – 9 June 1867	Succeeded by Alejandro de Castro
