= Alfredo Erquicia =

Spanish military officer (1897–1978)

- Born: Alfredo Erquicia Aranda; 24 October 1897; Jaén
- Died: 22 October 1978 (aged 80); Jerez de la Frontera
- Military career
- Allegiance: Kingdom of Spain (1913–1931); Spanish Republic (1931–1936); Spanish State (1936–1967)
- Branch: Spanish Army
- Service years: 1913–1967
- Rank: Lieutenant general
- Commands: Armoured Division No. 1 "Brunete"; Canary Islands; North Africa
- Conflicts: Rif War; Spanish Civil War
- Awards: See awards section
- Other work: Governor General of the plazas de soberanía

Alfredo Erquicia Aranda (24 October 1897 – 22 October 1978) was a Spanish military officer.

== Biography ==
He entered the Toledo Infantry Academy in 1913, promoted to lieutenant in 1918 and assigned to the Infantry Regiment "Asturias" No. 31, participating in the Rif War, during which he commanded a company of the Moroccan indigenous police.

After the outbreak of the Spanish Civil War, he joined the Nationalist faction. In the early days of the conflict, he organized the so-called "Volunteer Mounted Police Group" in Seville, an auxiliary surveillance force specializing in rearguard repression, of which Erquicia himself would be the commander. At the beginning of 1937, he participated in the conquest of Málaga, leading the "Antequera–Abdalajís" column, operating in the north of the Province of Málaga. During the course of the war, he also commanded the 2nd Brigade of the 32nd Division and the 2nd Brigade of the 102nd Division. Later, after rising to the rank of colonel, he obtained command of the 22nd Division, that covered the Cordoba front.

During the Francoist dictatorship he continued his military career, serving as head of the divisional infantry of the 23rd and 22nd divisions, and later as commander of the Armoured Division No. 1 "Brunete", based in Madrid. In 1959, after rising to the rank of lieutenant general, he was appointed Captain General of the Canary Islands. Later, in 1962, he would be appointed head of the Spanish Army of North Africa and Governor General of the plazas de soberanía. He went into reserve in 1967.

He died in Jerez de la Frontera on 22 October 1978.

== Awards ==
- Grand Cross of the Royal and Military Order of Saint Hermenegild (1947)
- Grand Cross of Military Merit (1949)
- Grand Cross of Naval Merit (1966)

== Bibliography ==
- Engel, Carlos (2000). Historia de las divisiones del ejército nacional (in Spanish). Almena Ediciones.
- Martínez Bande, José Manuel (1981). La batalla de Pozoblanco y el cierre de la bolsa de Mérida (in Spanish). Madrid: San Martín.
- Reig Tapia, Alberto (1990). Violencia y terror (in Spanish). Torrejón de Ardoz: Akal. ISBN 84-7600-693-4.
- Salas, Nicolás (1992). Sevilla fue la clave: república, alzamiento, Guerra Civil (1931–1939) (in Spanish). Castillejo. ISBN 8480580003.
- Mazarrasa, Javier de (1993). Corazón, cañones, corazas: División Acorazada Brunete no. 1 : cincuenta años de historia (in Spanish). ISBN 9788460615538.
