= Mechanised Infantry Division "Guzmán el Bueno" No. 2 =

The Mechanised Division "Guzmán el Bueno" No. 2 whose name recalled Guzmán el Bueno, a nobleman of 1256–1309, was a military formation of the Spanish Army, created in 1965. Its headquarters was located at Granada in the IX Military Region (Spain).

It was not the first use of the name "Guzman el Bueno" for an army division: Division de Infanteria Experimental No. 21 "Guzman el Bueno" (DIE 21) had existed from the 1950s as part of the Spanish "Pentomic" structure. The previous DIE 21 had been part of Army Corps 2 (Seville) and had had its headquarters at Algeciras, including Agrupación de infantería (AIs) at Seville (AI "Soria" 9); AI "Extremadura" 15 (Algeciras); AI Pavía 19 (San Roque); AI Álava 22 (Tarifa); and AI "Granada" 34 (Huelva), plus Agrupación Blindada Sagunto No. 7 (Cavalry Group No. 7 "Sagunto", located at Seville); RACA 14 at Seville; and battalions of sappers and signallers at Cádiz.

With the Francoist reorganisation of 1965, the army was divided into two parts, the Immediate Intervention Forces (FII) and the territorial defence forces. The FII were to be a "an army corps equipped and trained for conventional and limited nuclear warfare, ready to be deployed within or outside national borders." Three divisions were created as the spearhead of the Immediate Intervention Forces: Armoured Division No. 1 "Brunete", Mechanised Division No. 2 "Guzman el Bueno"; and Motorised Division "Maestrazgo" No. 3 with its headquarters in Valencia. The "Guzman el Bueno" Division as reorganised by 1970 had two brigades, Mechanised Brigade (BRIMZ) XXI at Cordoba, with RIMT Lepanto 2 Córdoba; Mechanized Infantry Regiment "Castilla" No. 16 at Badajoz; and Motorised Brigade (BRIMT) XXII at Jerez de la Frontera with RIMIX "Soria" 9 Sevilla and RIMT "Pavía" 19 at San Roque. Among its divisional troops was the now-Light Armored Cavalry Regiment "Sagunto" No. 7.

The division existed from 1965 to the mid-1990s, surviving the Modernización del Ejército de Tierra (META) reorganisation of 1984 onwards. But the "NORTE" Plan of 1994 reduced the now "Maneouvre Force," located in the old Captaincy General of Valencia, to an army corps equivalent of a complete heavy division and the equivalent of a light division with reduced support. The "Guzman el Bueno" division was disestablished, though its BRIMZ XXI was retained, renumbered BRIMZ X and moved to Cerro Muriano (see es:Brigada «Guzmán el Bueno» X), and incorporated within the remaining "Brunete" heavy division. The 7th Light Armoured Cavalry was disbanded in mid-1995.
