= Alejandro de Castro y Casal =

Spanish politician (1812–1881)

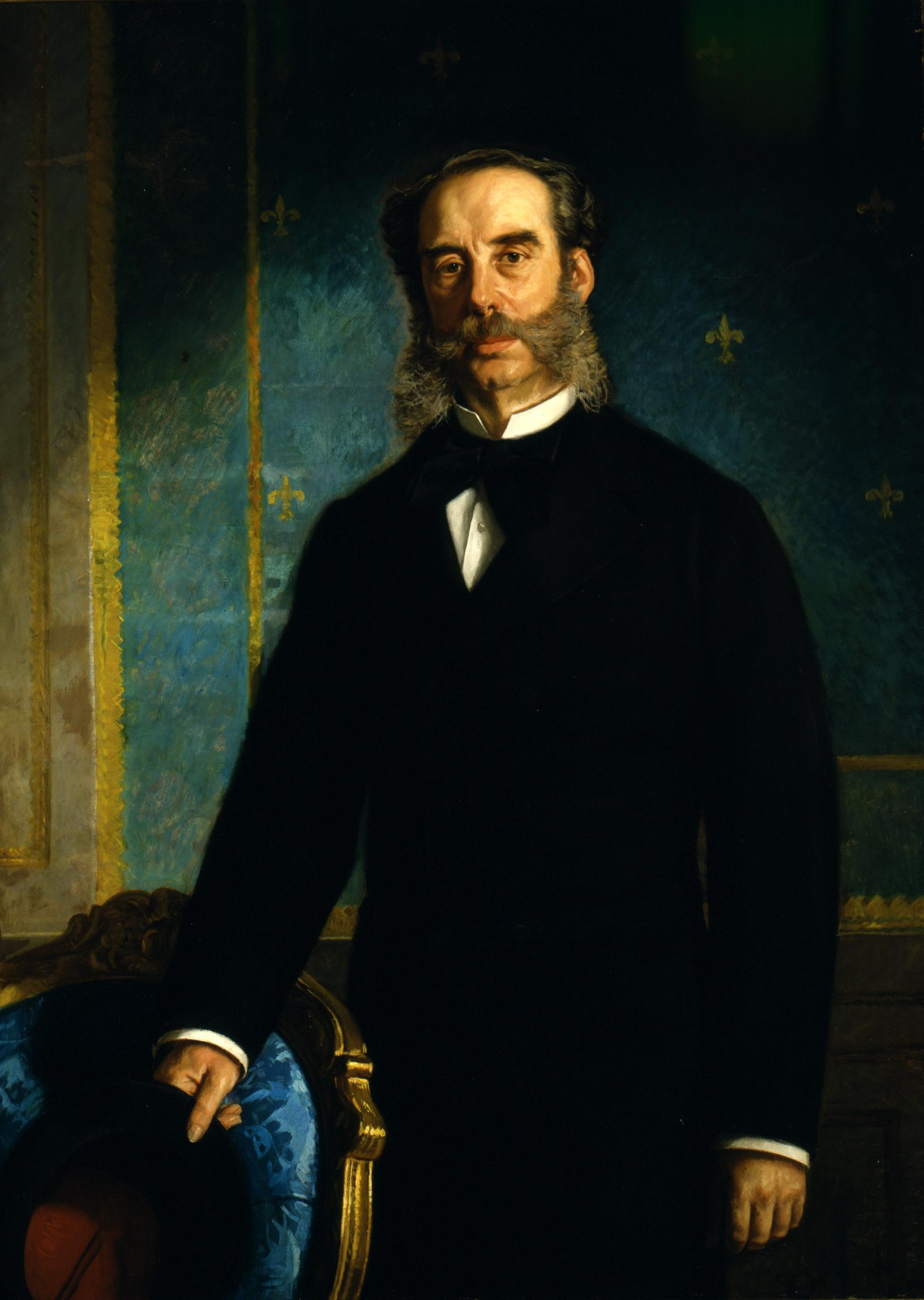
Alejandro de Castro

Alejandro de Castro y Casal (23 April 1812 in A Coruña, Spain – 6 July 1881 in Zarauz, Spain) was a Spanish politician who served as Minister of State and as President of the Congress of Deputies.

Political offices
Preceded by Eusebio de Calonge y Fenollet	Minister of State; 9 June 1867 – 27 June 1867	Succeeded by Lorenzo Arrazola
Preceded by Augusto Ulloa	Minister of State; 31 December 1874 – 12 September 1875	Succeeded by The Count of Casa Valencia
