= Southern Military Region =

Southern Military Region may refer to:

- Southern Military Region (Egypt)
- Southern Military Region (Sweden)

== See also ==
- Southern Military District
- Southern Region (disambiguation)
