= III Military Region (Spain) =

Military district of Spain

Coat of arms of Military Region III Levant

The III Military Region (Región Militar III Levante) also known as the Captaincy General of Valencia, was a historical subdivision of Spanish territory from the military point of view (a military district), from 1939 to 1984. Its jurisdiction extended through the provinces of the current Valencian Community, and the Murcia Region. The region's headquarters was located in Valencia.

== Territory ==
From 1943, it comprised the following six Province of Spain: Valencia, Castellón, Alicante, Albacete, and the Murcia.

By the 1980s, it had its headquarters in Valencia encompassed the provinces of Albacete, Alicante, Castellón, and Valencia, as well as the Region of Murcia and the Balearic Islands.

== History ==
=== Origins ===
The division of Spain into Captaincies General dates from 1705, when they adjusted to the old kingdoms that constituted the Hispanic Monarchy. They were thirteen regions: Andalusia, Aragon, Burgos, Canary Islands, Castilla la Vieja, Catalonia, Extremadura, Galicia, Coast of Granada, Guipúzcoa, Mallorca, Navarra and Valencia.

In 1898, the peninsular territory was divided into seven new Military Regions, at the same time that the General Command of Balearic Islands, Canary Islands, Ceuta and Melilla. The III Military Region has its origin in the Captaincy General of Valencia, maintaining headquarters and the five provinces of the old kingdoms of Valencia and of Murcia, temporarily adding the Cuenca province of the Captaincy General of Castilla la Nueva.

=== 20th century ===
After the proclamation of the Second Republic, a government decree dissolved the military regions and replaced them with Organic Divisions. In July 1936, the head of the III Organic Division was brigadier general Fernando Martínez-Monje Restoy.

In July 1939, after the end of the Spanish Civil War the military regions were re-established. The III Region is assigned the III Army Corps with two divisions. By 1944, the two division consisted of the 31st (Valencia, RI "Tetuán" 14 at Castellón; RI España 18 at Albacete; RI Guadalajara 20 at Valencia); and the 32nd (Alicante, with the RI "San Fernando" 11 at Alicante; RI Mallorca 13 at Lorca; RI Vizcaya 21 at Alcoy). The corps also had a naval base defence regiment, RIBN "Sevilla" 40 at Cartagena. There were a total of seven Infantry, 1 of Cavalry, 3 of Field Artillery, 1 of Anti-aircraft and one regiment of Engineers.

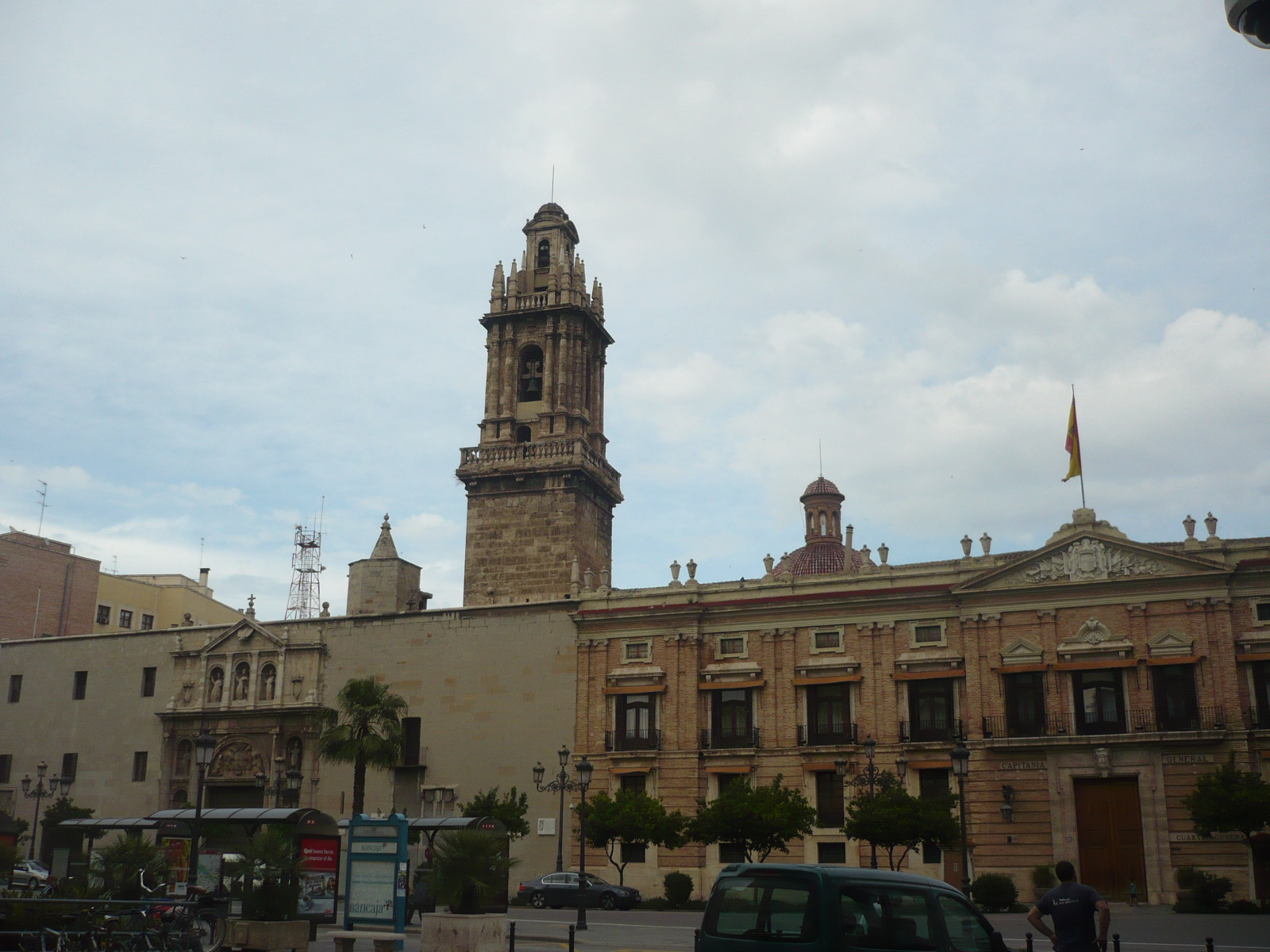
Convent of Santo Domingo de Valencia, the old headquarters of the Captaincy located next to the already disappeared Citadel

During the first moments of the failed 1981 Spanish coup d'état attempt the then captain general of the area, Lieutenant General Jaime Milans del Bosch, joined the uprising and decreed the State of War throughout the region under its jurisdiction. That night of February 23, Milans del Bosch took to the streets of Valencia with 1,800 military personnel and 60 tanks, which were broadcast on television. The city was surrounded by soldiers with armored vehicles and other army trucks that had left the bases of Bétera and Paterna. An armored column went to Manises Air Base to convince its commander to join the coup, but he did not. Furthermore, given the clear refusal of the King Juan Carlos I to support the coup plotters, del Bosch had to obey the King's orders and withdrew the troops from the streets. With the exception of Madrid (I Military Region), in no other military region were there attempted coups. The next day he was arrested and later on trial for the failed coup attempt.

In the 1995 territorial reorganisation, the 'Levant' character of the III Military Region was totally lost; the III Military Region was given the name 'Pirenaica,' made up of parts of the former IV and V Military Regions on the French border. A numbered RM III finally disappeared in 2002.

== See also ==
- Convent of Santo Domingo (Valencia) (a Spanish Army headquarters)
- Military Regions of Spain
