= Armoured Division No. 1 "Brunete" =

Military unit of Spain

The Mechanised Division No. 1 Brunete whose name recalled the Battle of Brunete during the Spanish Civil War, was a military formation of the Spanish Army, created in 1943 under the name of Armoured Division No. 1 and later as Armoured Division Brunete. It was disbanded after an Army reorganisation in 2006.

It was considered the best-armed and most powerful division in Spain, made up of an armoured brigade, two mechanised brigades, a cavalry regiment, a field artillery regiment, an anti-aircraft artillery regiment, an engineer group, as well as a logistics group and a grouping of the General Staff, with its units distributed in Castilla y León, Madrid, Castilla-La Mancha, Extremadura, La Rioja and Andalusia. With the military reform of 2006 it was deactivated, and ceased to exist, although its brigades continued in service.

In the late 1980s it included the XI Mechanised Infantry Brigade (including the 6th Mechanised Infantry Regiment), the XII Armoured Brigade (built around the 31st Mechanised Infantry Regiment "Asturias") and supporting formations and units.

== Franco regime ==
The division was established on August 20, 1943, in accordance with General Reserve Instruction No. 2 of the Central General Staff of the Spanish Army, on the basis of the previous 13th Division (es:13.ª División (Ejército Franquista)) part of the I Army Corps of Military Region I. It traces its name to the Battle of Brunete during the Spanish Civil War, which was the largest tank battle in the military history of Spain. Its origins can be found in the military restructuring after the civil war, in which five regiments of battle tanks were established that took advantage of the captured vehicles. In its beginnings it included an infantry regiment, two motorized infantry and one tank regiment.

Its most modern vehicles were 20 Panzer IV ausf H, bought from Nazi Germany during the Second World War, but it had many of the former Soviet T-26s captured in the civil war from the Republican People's Army. The Panzer IVs received in late 1943 were organized into two companies, distributed among two battalions in the division's armored regiment.

Its first major general in command was Ricardo Rada Peral, and the division was established at the El Goloso Camp, in the Sierra de Guadarrama.

With the normalization of diplomatic and military relations with the United States in the mid-1950s, M24 Chaffee and M47 Patton battle tanks, self-propelled artillery units, and a "heavy weapons" company joined the division. Between 1953 and 1968, the Spanish Army received a total of 446 medium battle tanks (M47s and M48s), 123 light tanks (M24 Chaffees and M41s), as well as 30 M74 armoured recovery vehicles. In 1970, the United States agreed to extend the military aid program by another five years, giving Spain another 66 M48A2 tanks and 17 M41A3s.

The division was reorganized in 1965 due to the new vehicles. This included the General Staff, based at El Pardo, and the Nucleo de Tropas Divisionario (Divisionary Troop Nucleus). The latter was formed by the Villaviciosa Light Armored Cavalry Regiment, the Campaign Artillery Regiment, the 1st Anti-Air Artillery Group, Engineering Regiment No. 1 and the Divisional Logistics Group. There were two fighting brigades: Mechanized Infantry Brigade XI, which included the 6th Saboya Motorized Infantry Regiment, the 55th Uad Ras Mechanized Infantry Regiment, the XI Self-Propelled Artillery Group, the XI Engineering Battalion and Logistics Group XI. The other was Armoured Brigade XII, which was made up of the 61st Alcázar de Toledo Armoured Infantry Regiment, the 31st Asturias Mechanized Infantry Regiment, the XII Self-Propelled Artillery Group, the XII Engineering Battalion and Logistics Group XII. The Alcázar de Toledo Armoured Infantry Regiment included most of the division's tanks, two regiments of 48 M48s and 54 M47s, respectively.

== 1981 attempted coup ==
The Brunete Division had an important role in the conspirators' plans for the 1981 Spanish coup d'état attempt (the so-called "23-F"), which occurred on February 23, 1981. At that time, it was made up of 13,000 troops with abundant vehicles and war material, and its commanding general was Major General José Juste Fernández. Prior to this, there was the General of Division Luis Torres Rojas (at that time, military governor of La Coruña, in the VIII Military Region) and previously before then Captain General of the III Military Region, Jaime Milans del Bosch. Both were military officers heavily involved in the conspiracy and with a long conspiratorial past. Important officers of the division, such as José Ignacio San Martín (chief of the division's General Staff) and Ricardo Pardo Zancada were fully in favour of the coup d'état and were active conspirators. During an official reception on November 18, 1980, Colonel José Ignacio San Martín had commented to the king Juan Carlos I that "in the division they were" pissed off, very pissed off "with the situation in the country."

By the afternoon of February 23, the Brunete commanders had received orders to place troops in Madrid "at the service of Spain and in the name of the King." They had been assigned the following positions: the Carrera de San Jerónimo, the Retiro Park, the Isabel II canal, the Campo del Moro (adjacent to the Palacio de Oriente) and the main media, especially Radio Televisión Española. Torres Rojas rushed back from La Coruña to try to take command of the division and get it involved in the coup, but did not succeed. The Brunete troops did not reach those sites because of the orders of the Captain General of Madrid, Lieutenant General Quintana Lacaci, who contained the commanders of the units that were already leaving. Much later, the divisional commander, Major General Juste, realizing that the King had not ordered any movement of troops (contrary to what the conspirators had announced), also ordered any action to be stopped. However, the hesitant attitude of General Juste in the first few moments earned him dismissal a few months later.

== Post Cold War ==
The division was reorganised and reduced after the end of the Cold War, under the NORTE plan. It was dissolved in 2006.
