= Meeting at Hendaye =

1940 meeting between German leader Adolf Hitler and Spanish dictator Francisco Franco

- Hitler and Franco at Hendaye station
- Host country: Vichy France
- Date: 23 October 1940
- Cities: Hendaye
- Venues: Hendaye station
- Participants: Adolf Hitler; Joachim von Ribbentrop; Francisco Franco; Ramón Serrano Suñer

The Meeting of Hendaye, or Interview of Hendaye, took place between Francisco Franco and Adolf Hitler, then respectively Caudillo of Spain and Führer of Germany, on 23 October 1940 at the railway station in Hendaye, France, near the Spanish–French border. The meeting was also attended by the respective Spanish and German foreign ministers: Ramón Serrano Suñer of Francoist Spain and Joachim von Ribbentrop of Nazi Germany.

The object of the meeting was an attempt to fix the terms for Spain to join the Axis Powers in their war against the British Empire. However, after seven hours of talks, the Spanish demands still appeared extortionate to Hitler—the cession of French Morocco and part of French Algeria alongside Gibraltar, the attachment of French Cameroon to the Spanish colony of Guinea, and large quantities of food, petrol and arms to relieve the critical economic and military situation faced by Spain after the Spanish Civil War (1936–1939). Hitler did not wish to disturb his relations with Vichy France by accepting Spanish territorial demands in the aftermath of the Battle of Dakar, in which the Vichy French had defeated an Allied attempt to capture the port of Dakar in French West Africa.

Ultimately, the meeting ended in failure and the only concrete result was the signing of a secret agreement under which Franco was committed to entering the war at a date of his own choosing, and Hitler gave only vague guarantees that Spain would receive "territories in Africa".

Francoist Spain maintained close political and economic ties to Nazi Germany and Fascist Italy throughout the period of the Holocaust. Francisco Franco had taken power in the Spanish Civil War with military aid from Germany and Italy. He was personally sympathetic to aspects of Nazi ideology, including anti-communism and antisemitism.

== See also ==
- Germany–Spain relations
- France–Spain relations
- Spain during World War II
- Spanish occupation of Tangier (1940–1945)
- Military history of Gibraltar during World War II
- Operation Felix
- Visit of Heinrich Himmler to Spain in 1940
