= Ricardo Pardo Zancada =

Spanish former military commander (born 1935)

- Born: 1935 (age 90–91); Badajoz
- Allegiance: División Acorazada Brunete
- Branch: Infantry major
- Conflicts: 1981 Spanish coup d'état attempt

Ricardo Pardo Zancada (born 1935) is a Spanish former military commander. He was commanding officer and he was involved in the 1981 Spanish coup d'état attempt, so he was sentenced to twelve years in prison for military rebellion and pardoned in 1989.
