= Captaincy General of Aragon =

Administrative district of the Spanish Empire (1711–1835)

Captaincy General of Aragon (1711-1835) Capitania General de Aragon (Spanish)
- 1711–Administrative dissolution: 1835 (Military dissolution: 1931)
- coat of arms of the Captaincy General of Aragon
- Status: Captaincy General of the Spanish Empire (1711-1835)
- Capital: Aragon
- Official languages: Spanish (official)
- Religion: Roman Catholicism (official)
- Government: Spanish Monarchy
  - 1700-1746: Philip V
  - 1746-1759: Ferdinand VI
  - 1759-1788: Charles III
  - 1788-1808: Charles IV
  - 1808–1813: Joseph I Bonaparte (not recognized)
  - 1810–1814: Cortes of Cádiz
  - 1814–1833: Ferdinand VII
- Historical era: Colonial era
  - Established: 1711
  - Disestablished: Administrative dissolution: 1835 (Military dissolution: 1931)
- Currency: Spanish colonial real

The Captaincy General of Aragon (Spanish: Capitanía General de Aragon) was an administrative district of the Spanish Empire created to replace the Kingdom of Aragon after the Nueva Planta decrees in 1711.

== History ==
=== Establishment ===
Following the Nueva Planta decrees by King Philip V of Spain in 1711, the Crown of Aragon was abolished. Aragon was merged with Castile to officially become a royal captaincy general of the Spanish Empire. At the conclusion of the political independence of the Kingdom of Aragon, the Captain General of Aragon was assigned by the Monarchy of Spain, succeeding the title of Viceroy of Aragon.

=== The 19th Century ===
The Treaty of Fontainebleau between King Charles IV and Napoleon allowed French troops to be positioned in Spain, ostensibly to prepare for the invasion of Portugal, thereby reinforcing his presence in the country. This led to widespread discontent and the Tumult of Aranjuez on March 17, 1808. The Spanish people pressured King Charles IV to abdicate in favor of his son and rival, Ferdinand VII who was declared the legitimate monarch two days into the rebellion. La Grande Armée of the First French Empire invaded and occupied Madrid by March 23, resulting in the Dos de Mayo Uprising on May 2. The French Emperor separately invited both Bourbon monarchs King Ferdinand VII and his father Charles IV to Bayonne and forced their abdications on May 7, 1808. As the Spanish monarchy renounced the throne, Napoleon's brother Joseph Bonaparte was installed as the king of Spain for a brief reign characterized by the Bayonne Constitution. News of the repression intensified Spanish resistance during the Peninsular War and the French occupation of Zaragoza. Jorge Juan Guillelmi, acting as the Captain-General of Aragon, refused to arm an uprising of Zaragozans on May 24, 1808, despite the threat posed by the invading Napoleonic Army. When his palace was stormed in Aragon's capital, the general was deposed and imprisoned in the Aljafería. As a result, the populace unanimously handed command of the government to José de Palafox y Melci. Stepping in as the Captain General, Palafox led the citizens of Zaragoza through the First siege of Zaragoza against the French forces under General Charles Lefebvre-Desnouettes as well as the Second siege of Zaragoza. Palafox was officially confirmed as the Captain-General of Aragon by the Cortes upon the Treaty of Valençay's withdrawal of French troops and restoration of King Ferdinand VII in 1813.

Due to reforms after the anti-clerical riots of 1835, the captaincy general of Aragon was stripped of its civil powers. It continued solely in a military capacity until 1931, when it was dissolved following the proclamation of the Second Spanish Republic and the Spanish Constitution of 1931.

On August 10, 1982, Aragon became one of the Autonomous communities of Spain.

== See also ==
- Kingdom of Aragon
- Crown of Aragon
- Nueva Planta decrees
