= VIII Military Region (Spain) =

1939-84 military district in Spain

The VIII Military Region, also known as the Captaincy General of Galicia, was a military district of the Spanish Armed Forces from 1939 to 1984. It was focused upon territorial defence.

It comprised the four Galician provinces: the Province of La Coruña, the Province of Lugo, the Province of Orense and Pontevedra.

== History ==
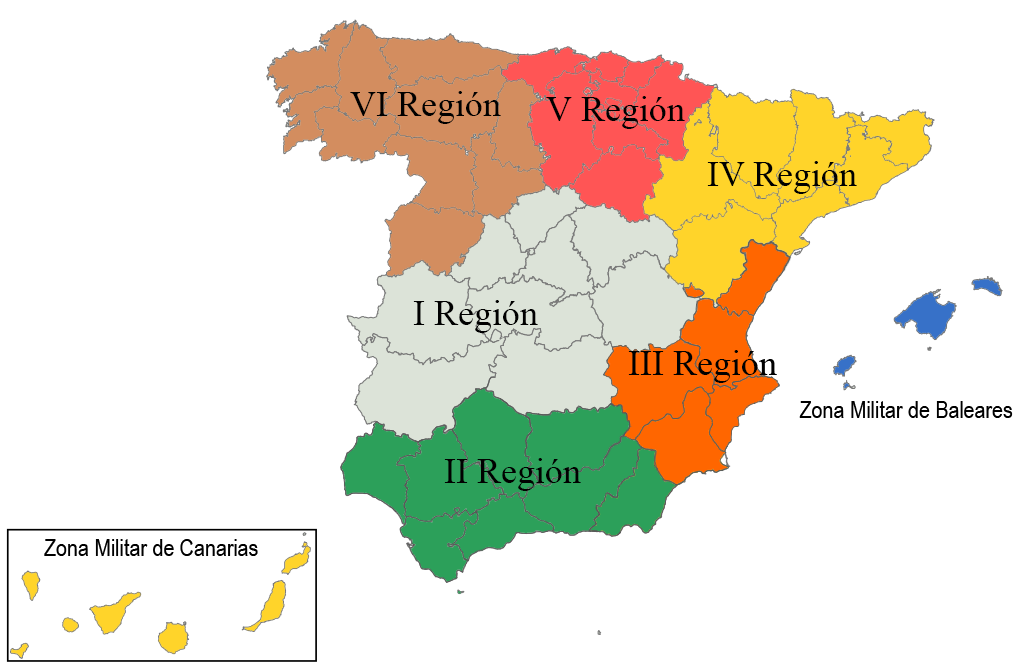
Military regions of the Spanish Army, after 1984.

The division of Spain into Captaincies General dates from 1705, when they were adjusted to the old kingdoms that constituted the Hispanic Monarchy. They were thirteen regions: Andalusia, Aragon, Burgos, Canary Islands, Castilla la Vieja, Catalonia, Extremadura, Galicia, Coast of Granada, Guipúzcoa, Mallorca, Navarra and Valencia.

In 1898 the peninsular territory was divided into seven new military regions, as well as the General Command of Balearic Islands, Canary Islands, Ceuta and the General Command of Melilla.

After the proclamation of the Second Spanish Republic in 1931, a government decree dissolved the military regions and replaced them with Organic Divisions. In July 1936, General Enrique Salcedo Molinuevo was the head of the VIII Organic Division. In July 1939, after the end of the Spanish Civil War the military regions were re-established. The VIII Region was assigned the VIII Army Corps with two divisions: the 81st (La Coruña) and the 82nd (Lugo). By 1944 the 81st Division was located at Lugo with the RI Zamora 8 Orense; RI Zaragoza 12 Santiago; and the RI Isabel la Católica 29 at La Coruña. The 82nd Division, now located at Vigo had the Regimiento de infanterí de Base Naval (RIBN) "Murcia" 42 at Vigo; RIBN Tarragona 43 at Pontevedra; and the RIBN Mérida 44 at Ferrol. Also part of the corps was Cavalry Regiment (RC) "Cazadores de Talavera" 13 at Lugo; the 48th (corps) and 28th (81st Div) artillery regiments; and battalions of sappers and signalers at Lugo.

The Region was disestablished in 1984 when Spain's military regions were reduced from nine to six. Organic Law 1/1984 of January 5 merged Military Region II with Military Region IX, the fourth with the fifth, and Military Region VII with Military Region VIII. Regions VII and VIII became RM II Sur.

== See also ==
- Military Regions of Spain
