= Jesús Gayoso Rey =

Spanish policeman (1971–2020)

- Born: Jesús Gayoso Rey; 26 April 1971; Mieres, Asturias, Spain
- Died: 27 March 2020 (aged 48); Logroño, Spain
- Military career
- Allegiance: Kingdom of Spain
- Branch: Spanish Civil Guard
- Service years: 1996–2020
- Rank: Lieutenant colonel
- Commands: Head of the Rapid Action Group; Chief of Haro lockdown during coronavirus pandemic in Spain

Jesús Gayoso Rey (26 April 1971 – 27 March 2020) was a Spanish Lieutenant colonel Civil Guard. He had been head of the Rapid Action Group since 2014.

== Biography ==
Gayoso was born in the Asturian town of Mieres in 1971, but grew up in La Coruña. He was the son of a Civil Guard and was married. He died on 27 March 2020 as a result of complications from COVID-19.

== Career ==
In 1991, Gayoso joined the Zaragoza General Military Academy, where he graduated as a lieutenant in July 1996. That same year, after successfully completing the special training course, he was assigned to the 1st Company of the Rapid Action Group (Grupo de Acción Rápida, GAR), based in Bilbao, where his unit participated in counter-terrorism operations. When he was promoted to captain, he took charge of the 3rd Company of Navarra, and later, between 2001 and 2007, he directed the 2nd Company of San Sebastián, based in Inchaurrondo.

As commander, he was assigned to the General Staff of the Directorate-General of the Civil Guard, where he remained from 2009 to 2014. Finally, he returned as Chief of GAR, the elite unit of the Civil Guard, where he was promoted to lieutenant colonel.

During his professional career, he participated in several humanitarian missions abroad, being assigned to the mission in Afghanistan between 2009 and 2010, and in countries such as Tunisia, Belarus, Mauritania, Niger, Turkey, Bulgaria, Chile, Israel, Iraq, Finland, Romania, Honduras, and Morocco. He was appointed the leader of the European Union project GARSI-Sahel, where police from African countries similar to GAR are trained. His last commission was in Niger, where he was deployed with a Company of Gendarmes on the border with Mali.

=== 2020 Haro lockdown ===
The GAR headquarters were established in Logroño. La Rioja is one of the regions of Spain hardest hit by the COVID-19 pandemic. During the first weeks, one of the main outbreaks was located in the Rioja town of Haro. To contain the disease, the GAR in that municipality carried out security and disinfection tasks. Gayoso contracted the disease, although he was not physically deployed in Haro, and was admitted to the intensive care unit of the San Pedro de Logroño Hospital. On 27 March 2020, the Ministry of the Interior announced that he had died, becoming the fourth fatality within the security corps due to the disease.

== Awards ==
- 10 Crosses with white insignia to the merit of the Civil Guard.
- 3 Silver Crosses to the merit of the Civil Guard.
- Order of Civil Merit (2018)
- Order of Police Merit
- Cross of Aeronautical Merit
- Cross of Military Merit
- 1 Medal of Merit in the Afghanistan Campaign by the US Armed Forces.
- 1 Commendable Service Medal of the Army of the Armed Forces.
- 1 Bronze Medal of the French National Defense.
