= Marcial Barro García =

Spanish military officer

- Born: Marcial Barro García; 6 January 1879; Kingdom of Spain
- Died: Unknown
- Military career
- Allegiance: Kingdom of Spain (1895–1931); Spanish Republic (1931–1936); Nationalist faction (1936–1939); Nationalist Spain (1939–1941)
- Branch: Spanish Army
- Service years: 1895–1941
- Rank: General
- Commands: 13th Infantry Brigade; Military Governor of Valladolid; VII Military Region
- Conflicts: Spanish Civil War
- Other work: Inspector General of the Civil Guard (1936–1937)

Marcial Barro García (1879 – unknown) was a Spanish military officer, general of the Spanish Army and Director General of the Civil Guard within the Nationalist faction during the Spanish Civil War.

== Biography ==
Born on 6 January 1879, he entered the Toledo Infantry Academy on 26 August 1895. In 1934 he rose to the rank of brigadier general.

Shortly after his promotion he was appointed commander of the 13th Infantry Brigade, based in Valladolid. In July 1936 he was still in charge of this unit. Implicated in the conspiracy, when the Spanish coup of July 1936 took place he joined the uprising. In September 1936 he assumed the position of Inspector General of the Civil Guard, on an interim basis. During this period he directed and organized the remnants of the Civil Guard in the Nationalist zone. He held the position until his dismissal on 12 March 1937, being replaced by General Ricardo Serrador Santés. On that date he also ceased to be commander of the 13th Infantry Brigade.

In June 1937 he was appointed military governor of Valladolid, a position that a few months later would be added to that of Captain General of the VII Military Region. He held both posts until shortly after the end of the Civil War, resigning in 1939. In 1941 he was placed in reserve status.

== Decorations ==
- Grand Cross of the Royal and Military Order of Saint Hermenegild (1935)

== Bibliography ==
- Clemente, José Carlos (1995). Ejército y conflictos civiles en la España contemporánea (in Spanish). Fundamentos.
- de Arce, Carlos (1998). Los generales de Franco (in Spanish). Seuba Ediciones.
- Martínez Bande, José Manuel (2007). Los años críticos: República, conspiración, revolución y alzamiento (in Spanish). Madrid: Encuentro. ISBN 978-84-306-0487-6.
- Merino, Julio (1985). La tragedia de los generales españoles, 1936 (in Spanish). Barcelona: Plaza y Janés.
- Puig, Jaime J. (1984). Historia de la Guardia Civil (in Spanish). Editorial Mitre.

Government offices
Preceded by Federico de la Cruz Boullosa	Inspector General of the Civil Guard; 1936–1937	Succeeded by Ricardo Serrador Santés
