= Fernando Cotoner y Chacón =

Spanish politician and military personnel (1817–1888)

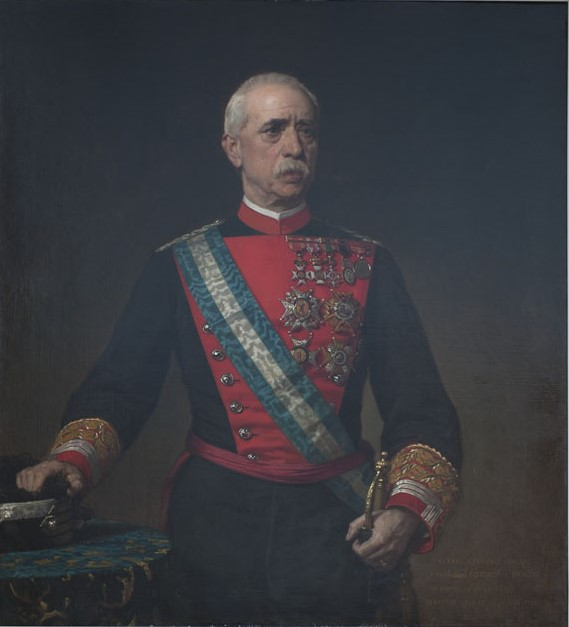

Director General of the Civil Guard
- In office September 28, 1874 – January 21, 1882
- Preceded by: José Antonio Turón y Prats
- Succeeded by: Tomás García-Cervino y López de Sigüenza

Minister of War (acting)
- In office June 29, 1874 – September 3, 1874
- Preceded by: Juan de Zavala
- Succeeded by: Francisco Serrano Bedoya

Captain General of Catalonia
- In office 1865 – 1866
- Preceded by: Rafaél de Echagüe y Bermingham
- Succeeded by: Manuel Gasset y Mercader

Captain General of Catalonia
- In office 1863 – 1864
- Preceded by: Luis García y Miguel
- Succeeded by: Rafael Mayalde y Villaroya

Captain General of Aragon
- In office 1862 – 1863

Governor of Puerto Rico
- In office January 28, 1857 – July 31, 1860
- Preceded by: José Lémery e Ibarrola
- Succeeded by: Sabino Gamir Maladen

Captain General of Mallorca
- In office 1847 – 1854
- Preceded by: Miguel Tacón y Rosique
- Succeeded by: Bernardo de Echaluce

Member of the Congress of Deputies for the Balearic Islands
- In office 1843 – 1847

Personal details
- Born: January 17, 1817 Palma de Mallorca, Balearic Islands, Spain
- Died: June 16, 1888 (aged 71) Barcelona, Kingdom of Spain
- Party: Constitutional Party
- Children: José Cotoner y Allendesalazar
- Parent: José Cotoner y Despuig
- Occupation: Politician & strategist
- Awards: Grand Cross of the Order of Charles III; Grandee of Spain; Marquisate of Cenia; Order of Calatrava; Order of Isabella the Catholic; Royal and Military Order of Saint Ferdinand; Royal and Military Order of Saint Hermenegild

Military service
- Rank: General

Fernando Cotoner y Chacón (1817-1888), 1st marqués de la Cenia, Lieutenant at the Carlist Wars, Governor of Puerto Rico, interim Minister of War and Director general of the Civil Guard.Captain General of the Balearic Islands. Senator for life for the Balearic Islands.
