= Enrique Cánovas Lacruz =

Spanish military officer

- Born: Enrique Cánovas Lacruz; June 29, 1877; A Coruña, Kingdom of Spain
- Died: October 13, 1965 (aged 88); Madrid, Francoist Spain
- Spouse: Concepción Curbera Vicuña (m. 1910; died 1933)
- Military career
- Allegiance: Kingdom of Spain (1892–1931); Spanish Republic (1931–1936); Nationalist faction (1936–1939); Nationalist Spain (1939–1943)
- Branch: Spanish Army
- Service years: 1892–1943
- Rank: General
- Commands: General Command of the Balearic Islands; III Military Region
- Conflicts: Rif War; Revolution of 1934; Spanish Civil War
- Awards: Grand Cross of the Order of Cisneros; Grand Cross (with White Decoration) of Military Merit
- Other work: Director General of the Civil Guard (1942–1943)

Enrique Cánovas Lacruz (29 June 1877 – 13 October 1965) was a Spanish military officer, captain general of Valencia and Director General of the Civil Guard during the early years of the Francoist regime. With the rank of colonel, he led the Spanish coup of July 1936 in Galicia, since generals Enrique Salcedo (commander of the VIII Military Region) and Rogelio Caridad Pita (military governor of A Coruña) refused to join the uprising; they were arrested and executed.

== Biography ==
Born in A Coruña on 29 June 1877, his parents were Pascual Cánovas Carrillo, captain of the Infantry, and his mother Práxedes Lacruz Tordesillas. Shortly after, the family moved to Vigo, where he spend his childhood and managed to excel in his studies. On August 24, 1892, when he was barely 15 years old, he entered the General Military Academy of Toledo.

After his return from Cuba, he married Concepción Curbera Vicuña, daughter of local businessman Enrique Curbera Tapias, on 23 September 1910. His wife died on 4 November 1933. Two years later, in 1935, he entered the Generalate Promotion Course.

Graduated from the Academy of Military Engineering of Guadalajara, after passing through the General Military Academy of Toledo, at the time of the coup d'état on 18 July 1936, he held the rank of colonel and was chief of the Service of Engineers of the VIII Military Region. He joined the Nationalist faction and was in charge of making the coup succeed in Vigo. During the Civil War he was promoted to divisional general and assigned to the General Command of the Balearic Islands from 1937 until the end of the conflict.

On 7 October 1940, he replaced Lieutenant General Antonio Aranda as Captain General of the III Military Region. During his tenure, he softened the situation of the special courts, allowing defenders to provide all kinds of evidence. On 13 April 1942, he was appointed Director General of the Civil Guard, a position he held until 1 July 1943, when he moved to the reserve. During his tenure, the internal regulations and official uniforms were approved.

== Awards ==
- Grand Cross (with White Decoration) of Military Merit (1941)
- Grand Cross of the Order of Cisneros (1965)

Government offices
Preceded by Eliseo Álvarez-Arenas Romero	Director General of the Civil Guard; 13 April 1942 – 1 July 1943	Succeeded by Camilo Alonso Vega
