= José Miguel Vega Rodríguez =

Spanish military officer (1913–1992)

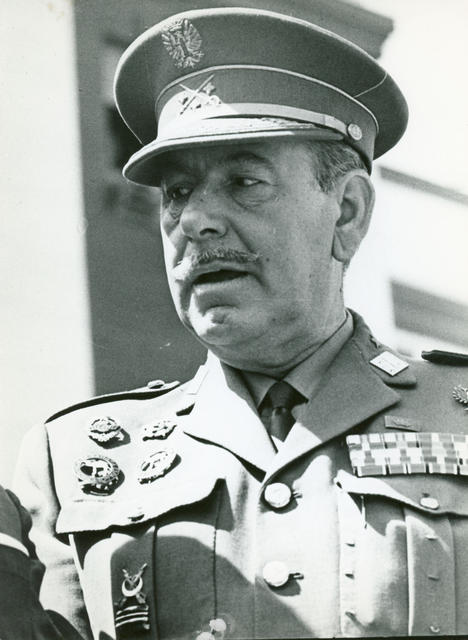
- Born: 19 December 1913; Ceuta
- Died: 30 May 1992 (aged 78); Madrid
- Burial place: Mingorrubio Cemetery; 40°32′12″N 3°47′11″W
- Spouse: María de los Ángeles Guillén Fernández
- Children: 3
- Military career
- Allegiance: Spanish Republic (1936); Nationalist Spain (1936–1941, 1942–1979); Nazi Germany (1941–1942)
- Branch: Spanish Army; German Army (Wehrmacht)
- Service years: 1936–41, 1942–79 (Spain); 1941–42 (Germany)
- Rank: Lieutenant general
- Units: 33rd Cádiz Infantry Regiment; Regulares; Blue Division
- Conflicts: Spanish Civil War; World War II
- Awards: See awards section
- Other work: Governor of Ifni (1967–1969); Director General of the Civil Guard (1974–1975)

Director general of the Civil Guard of Spain
- In office 17 May 1974 – 10 October 1975
- Caudillo: Francisco Franco
- Prime Minister: Carlos Arias Navarro
- Minister of Governance: José García Hernández
- Preceded by: Carlos Iniesta Cano
- Succeeded by: Ángel Campáno López

Chief of Staff of the Army of Spain
- In office 13 January 1977 – 24 May 1978
- Monarch: Juan Carlos I
- Prime Minister: Adolfo Suárez
- Minister of the Army: Félix Álvarez-Arenas (Note: Until 5 July 1977.)
- Minister of Defence: Manuel Gutiérrez Mellado (Note: From 5 July 1977.)
- Preceded by: Ramón Cuadra Medina
- Succeeded by: Tomás de Liniers y Pidal

Governor-General of Ifni
- In office 9 May 1967 – 25 June 1969
- Caudillo: Francisco Franco
- Prime Minister: Francisco Franco
- Minister of Foreign Affairs: Fernando María Castiella
- Preceded by: Marino Trovo Larrasquito
- Succeeded by: Position abolished

José Miguel Vega Rodríguez (19 December 1913 – 30 May 1992) was a Spanish military officer. He served in numerous positions, most notably as President of the Supreme Council of Military Justice, Chief of Staff of the Army and Director General of the Civil Guard. Additionally, he served as the last colonial governor of Ifni.

== Biography ==
Vega was born in Ceuta on 19 December 1913. Son of Lieutenant Colonel Antonio Vega Montes de Oca, arrested after the Sanjurjo uprising in 1932, the family was left in a precarious economic situation, so Vega decided to join the infantry as a volunteer soldier on 1 July 1932, becoming a second-class Civil Guard on 24 March 1934. On 25 April 1934, he joined the 18th Civil Guard Regiment, based in Córdoba, specifically in a rural post in Moratella, on the estate of the Marquis of Viana. Meanwhile, he studied the exact sciences with scarce means and great effort at the University of Córdoba (passing the first year and being the only student at the university to obtain an outstanding grade in mathematical analysis) and prepared for the Military Academy entrance exams, managing to enter the Toledo Infantry Academy on 20 January 1936, forming part of a promotion of officers that would later be known as "the Montaña barracks promotion."

=== Civil War ===
On 15 July 1936, Vega arrived in Cádiz on vacation, coming from the Montaña barracks in Madrid, where he was a student. Two days later, on 17 July, while still in Cádiz, he was surprised by the Spanish coup of July 1936 against the Second Republic, which started the Spanish Civil War. He reported to the 33rd Cádiz Infantry Regiment and fought in that Nationalist unit until the end of April 1937, when he moved to the III Tabor of the 4th Group of the Regulares of Larache. He reached the rank of second lieutenant on 28 October 1938, the rank of provisional lieutenant that same year and the rank of provisional captain on 6 May 1939.

=== World War II ===
As a captain, during World War II, on 1 July 1941 Vega joined the Blue Division (Spanish: División Azul, German: Blaue Division), or the 250th Infantry Division of the German Wehrmacht, the unit of Spanish volunteers sent to fight alongside the Axis powers against the Soviet Union on the Eastern Front. On 1 August 1941 he was assigned as head of the II Company of the 250th Mobile Reserve Battalion. During that campaign he achieved promotion to commander for war merits. On 26 October 1942 he returned to Spain.

=== Francoist period ===
Vega was promoted to brigadier general in 1966 and to divisional general in 1970. Until these promotions, he held, among other important positions, that of colonel-chief of the Saharan Tercio "Alejandro Farnesio" IV of the Spanish Legion in Villa Cisneros (Spanish Sahara), the head of the General Staff of the VII Military Region in Valladolid, the military governor of Gran Canaria, as well as the governor of Ifni, being appointed on 29 May 1967. While in this position, he issued the last General Order of the territory and carried out the last lowering of the Spanish flag in Sidi Ifni, for the retrocession of the colony to Morocco on 30 June 1969.

Borders of the Ifni territory (red line) at the time of the retrocession to Morocco.

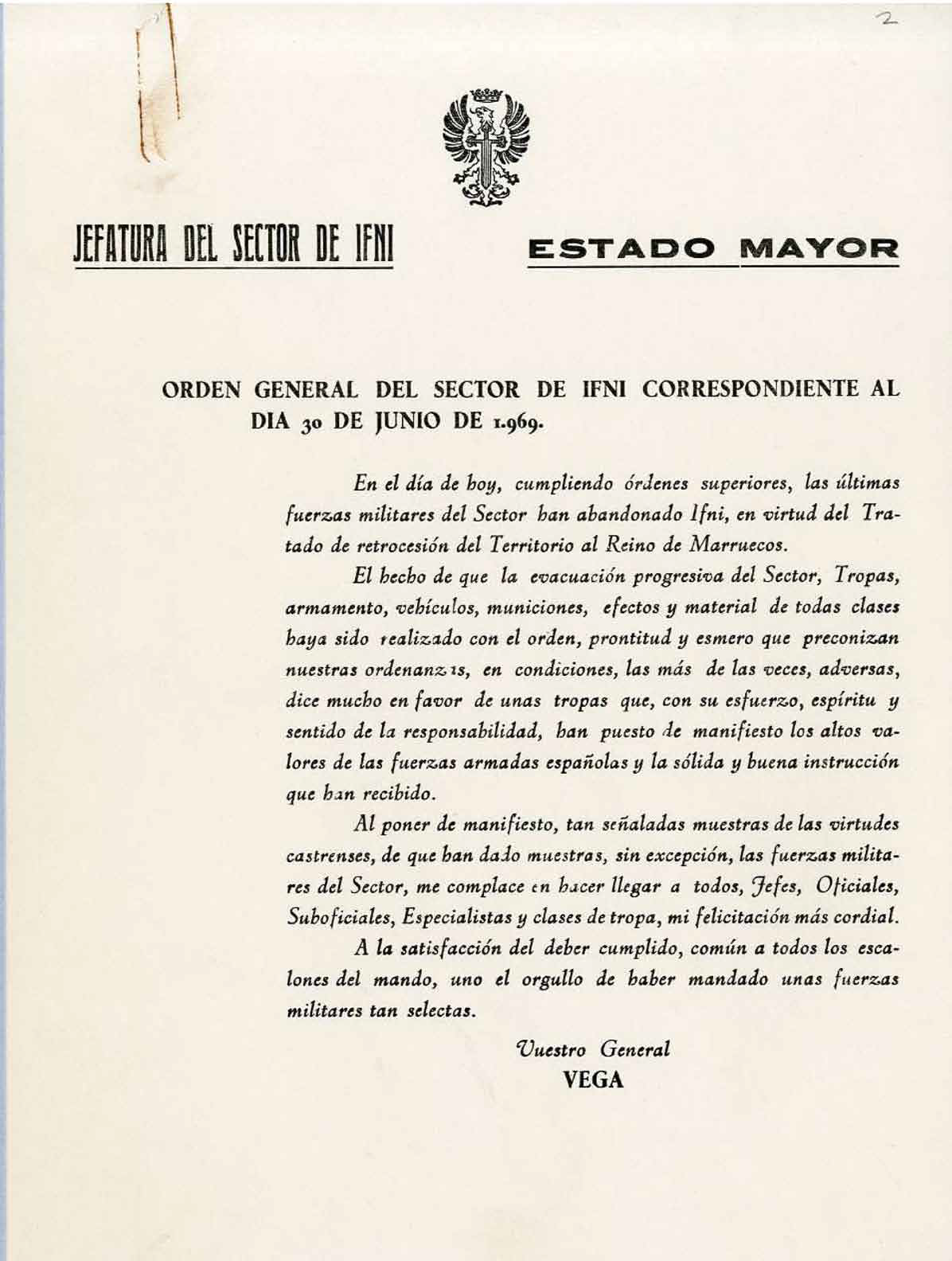
The last General Order of the Ifni territory, issued by General Vega on 30 June 1969

He also presided over the retrocession ceremony together with General Mohamed Oufkir, Moroccan Minister of the Interior, in Plaza de España on 1 July 1969. After the act of lowering and raising the flags, General Vega pronounced the following words:

Mr. Minister:

It is a great honour for me to represent the Spanish Government before Your Excellency at the ceremony of the handover of Ifni to the Kingdom of Morocco.

My General, we have left here the best of Spain, our desire and our concern has always been to respect the beliefs, customs and habits of the people of Ifni and to contribute to the extent of our ability to the cultural and economic development of its population.

I would like to record the cordial welcome that the Administration, the armed forces and the population have given to the Moroccan Administration and ask Your Excellency to offer His Majesty King Hassan II the assurance that he will find among the Baamaranis his most faithful and loyal subjects.

To you, my people, I want to say that I will always have you in my heart and that, if I have succeeded during my time at the head of this territory, in earning your respect and friendship, I will consider myself amply rewarded for my efforts.

Allow me, Your Excellency, to be the first to echo the traditional ties of friendship that unite our peoples and shout in your honour:

Long live Morocco!

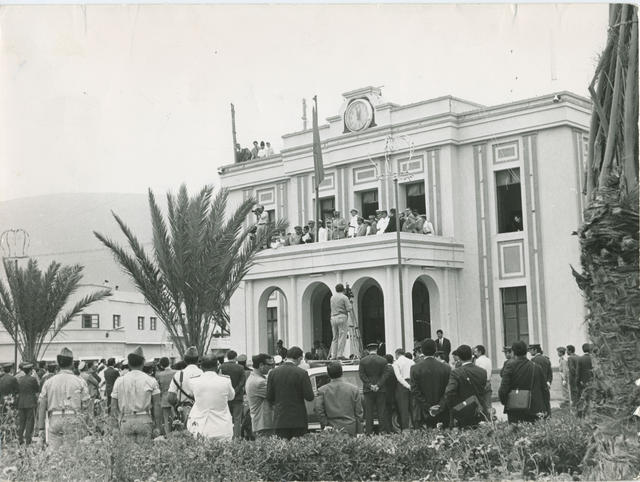
The retrocession ceremony of the Ifni territory to Morocco in Plaza de España, 1 July 1969

He also taught at the Army Higher School, of which he became director. He taught classes in war economy, international law and military organization. In his teaching role, it is worth highlighting the humanistic side in the training of officers, having studied two years of philosophy and literature at the University of Granada. In fact, in the first lesson of the VI Course for Senior Commands, in the presence of the Prince of Spain (the future King Juan Carlos I), he gave a lecture called: "Philosophy and military command: overcoming crises through the ages".

He was promoted to the rank of lieutenant general on 23 February 1973, a rank with which he was named Captain General of the VII Military Region, holding that position until 27 April 1973, when he was named President of the Supreme Council of Military Justice.

On 17 May 1974, he was appointed Director General of the Civil Guard, a position he held until 10 October 1975. The exceptional circumstance was that, having joined the Civil Guard in 1932 as a lower-ranking guard, 42 years later he reached its highest command. During his period as Director General he was known as "Guard Vega". After his term in office, he returned to the position of Captain General of the VII Military Region.

=== Transition ===
On 18 March 1976, Vega left the Captaincy General of the VII Military Region and was assigned to the I Military Region as captain general. On 27 April 1976, the ceremony of his inauguration was held in the throne room of the Captaincy General of the I Military Region. When Vega took the floor, he briefly reviewed his military career and assessed the past, present and future of the army, ending with the following reflection:

It would be well to remember that ideas must not be confused with ideals. Ideals should be like stars; lofty, permanent, dazzling, but unattainable. Ideas are like running water, which needs to be renewed to maintain its clarity. Remain faithful to ideals by ascending the ladder of ideas, which is the key to spiritual evolution.

The Council of Ministers held on 13 January 1977 appointed him Chief of Staff of the Army (JEME), that would soon be integrated into the new military structure of the Board of Joint Chiefs of Staff (JUJEM), created pursuant to Royal Decree-Law 11/1977, of 8 February.

At the Pascua Militar celebration on 6 January 1978, he gave a speech before King Juan Carlos I, in which he praised the military capabilities of Enrique Líster and Juan Modesto, leaders of the Spanish Republican Army in the Spanish Civil War. This caused expressions of surprise and annoyance in some of the military attendees, and caused Lieutenant General Carlos Iniesta Cano, who was present at the event in a very visible place, to cross himself. At the end of the event, what he had said was the subject of extensive comment among those present.

Even on the side opposite us, there have been people who, perhaps, if they had felt the calling at an early age, would have been magnificent generals and perhaps would not have thought the way they thought, and I am referring to Modesto, Líster, etc., who undoubtedly had some of these military virtues that we are all interested in having, especially in the highest ranks.

After having strong disagreements with Manuel Gutiérrez Mellado, at that time first vice president of the government and minister of defence, he resigned his position on 17 May 1978, noting his disagreement with the government policy of military appointments, in effect little respectful of the professional careers of the generals, and also with the reduction of the functions of the JUJEM, pursuant to Royal Decree 836/1978, of 27 March.

The last active position he held was again that of president of the Supreme Council of Military Justice, which he held from 25 August 1978 to 20 December 1979, when he was transferred to the "Arms or Corps Destination" group, having reached the retirement age of 66 on 19 December 1979.

=== Democracy ===
Vega went into the active reserve on 12 October 1982.

On the occasion of the celebration of the golden anniversary of the "Montaña Barracks promotion", on 11 April 1986, he was received in audience by King Juan Carlos I along with the rest of his classmates.

On 30 May 1992, he died at the "Generalísimo Franco" Military Hospital in Madrid, and was buried in the Mingorrubio Cemetery.

On 22 May 1999, he was posthumously promoted to the honorary rank of the General of the Army.

== Private life ==
Vega's grandfather was a rear admiral in the Spanish Navy and his father, Antonio Vega Montes de Oca, was a well-known military officer who participated in the Sanjurjo uprising with the rank of lieutenant colonel. He was arrested and admitted to the Castle of Santa Catalina along with other military officers, including José Enrique Varela.

He was a deeply military, liberal man (although he defined himself as a social democrat), great soldier, of extraordinary austerity, and with a deep-rooted sense of democracy. He was married to María de los Ángeles Guillén Fernández, and was the father of two sons and a daughter (María Luisa Vega Guillén). One of his sons died in a traffic accident, a tragedy that was difficult for him to overcome, and the other followed the family military tradition in the infantry (Fernando Vega Guillén).

== Awards ==
- Iron Cross
  - 2nd class (1942)
  - 1st class (1942)
- Cross (with White Decoration) of Military Merit, 3rd class (1961)
- Cross (with White Decoration) of Naval Merit, 3rd class (1964)
- Grand Cross of the Royal and Military Order of Saint Hermenegild (1966)
- Order of Africa with the Category of Grand Officer (1968)
- Grand Cross (with White Decoration) of Aeronautical Merit (1969)
- Grand Cross of the Order of Civil Merit (1969)
- Grand Cross (with White Decoration) of Military Merit (1972)
- Grand Cross (with White Decoration) of Naval Merit (1974)

== Notes ==
Military offices
Preceded by Ramón Cuadra Medina	Chief of Staff of the Spanish Army; 13 January 1977 – 24 May 1978	Succeeded by Tomás de Liniers y Pidal
Government offices
Preceded by Carlos Iniesta Cano	Director General of the Civil Guard; 17 May 1974 – 10 October 1975	Succeeded by Ángel Campano López
Preceded by Marino Trovo Larrasquito	Governor of Ifni; 29 May 1967 – 30 June 1969	Position abolished Retrocession of the territory to Morocco
