= Ricardo Serrador Santés =

Spanish military officer

- Born: Ricardo Serrador Santés; 1877; Talavera de la Reina
- Died: January 23, 1943 (aged 65–66); Santa Cruz de Tenerife
- Military career
- Allegiance: Nationalist Spain
- Branch: Spanish Army
- Rank: General
- Commands: Captaincy General of the Canary Islands
- Conflicts: Rif War; Sanjurjada; Spanish Civil War
- Awards: Grand Cross of the Royal and Military Order of Saint Hermenegild (1941); Grand Cross (with White Decoration) of Military Merit (1941); Grand Cross (with White Decoration) of Naval Merit (1942)
- Other work: Inspector General of the Civil Guard (1937)

Ricardo Serrador Santés (Talavera de la Reina, 1877 – Santa Cruz de Tenerife, 23 January 1943) was a Spanish military officer, known for his participation in the Spanish Civil War on the Nationalist side.

== Biography ==
=== Military career ===
Son and grandson of soldiers, as a young man he entered the Toledo Infantry Academy. He participated in the Rif War commanding a unit of the Regulares, forming part of the so-called Africanists.

With the rank of colonel he participates in Sanjurjada, the failed attempted coup d'état led by General José Sanjurjo, on 10 August 1932. He was convicted, dismissed from service and exiled to Villa Cisneros in Spanish Sahara, although at the end of 1932 he managed to escape along with other convicts. Accepted by the amnesty granted by the radical government of Alejandro Lerroux, he rejoined the Spanish Army and was assigned to Valladolid, headquarters of the VII Organic Division.

Serrador actively participated in the military conspiracy that led to the Spanish coup of July 1936, being one of the organizers of the Nationalist uprising in the Province of Valladolid. These activities raised the suspicions of the Madrid authorities, so in April he was sanctioned by the Government with a month of arrest in Cartagena and later forcibly assigned to Madrid. However, Serrador managed to evade police surveillance and on 19 July he managed to move to Valladolid.

=== Civil War ===
Already in Valladolid he met the retired general Andrés Saliquet, new leader of the uprising in the city, who after deposing general Nicolás Molero managed to take control of the VII Organic Division. Throughout that day the rebels managed to suppress the pockets of resistance, especially the workers.

At midnight on Tuesday, 21 July, Serrador left Valladolid commanding a column composed of Falangists from the city with the mission of occupying an important mountain pass in the Sierra de Guadarrama, the Guadarrama Pass, located west of Somosierra. At two in the morning on the 22nd, they left along the Olmedo highway towards Villacastín and the pass along the N-VI Madrid–A Coruña highway. When they arrived at the pass they found that it had already been occupied by a group of the MAOC militiamen from Madrid, but they managed to evict them during the Battle of Guadarrama, and on 25 July it was in their hands. However, their advance towards Madrid was stalled by strong Republican resistance, so their offensive towards the capital failed. The front in this sector will remain motionless until the end of the conflict.

At the end of 1936 he was appointed commander of the "Ávila" Division. Later Serrador was appointed commander of the 71st Division, and later Chief of the "Group of Divisions of Guadarrama–Somosierra" that garrisoned the front in the Sierra de Guadarrama. While in command of the 71st Division, during the Battle of Brunete the initial Republican attack caught his unit by surprise, forcing them to give ground and suffering serious casualties.

Coat of arms of the Captaincy General of the Canary Islands

On 8 January 1937, he was promoted to brigadier general, and on 23 February 21939, he became major general.

=== Captain General of the Canaries ===
After the end of the Civil War, in August 1939 he was appointed Captain General of the Canary Islands, a position he would hold until his death on 23 January 1943. His period as military commander in the Canary Islands coincided with World War II, which gave him greater power. He was also appointed head of the Economic Command of the Canary Islands, which was created to try to avoid isolation of the archipelago during the years of the conflict. Shortly before his death he was promoted to the rank of lieutenant general.

== See also ==
- Our Lady of Africa Market
- General Serrador Bridge

== Bibliography ==
- VV.AA. (1990). Historia general de España y América XVII. La segunda república y la guerra civil (in Spanish). Madrid: Ediciones Rialp.

Government offices
Preceded by Marcial Barro García	Inspector General of the Civil Guard; 1937	Succeeded by Emilio Fernández Pérez
Military offices
Preceded by Vicente Valderrama Arias	Captain General of the Canary Islands; 1939–1943	Succeeded by Eugenio Sanz de Larín; Interim
