= Eliseo Álvarez-Arenas Romero =

Spanish military officer

- Born: Eliseo Álvarez-Arenas Romero; June 14, 1882; Alcázar de San Juan, Kingdom of Spain
- Died: July 8, 1966 (aged 84); Madrid, Francoist Spain
- Military career
- Allegiance: Nationalist Spain
- Branch: Spanish Army
- Rank: General
- Commands: VI Organic Division; General Command of Melilla; Captaincy General of Barcelona; V Military Region; Captaincy General of Valencia; III Military Region
- Conflicts: Rif War; Spanish Civil War
- Awards: Grand Cross (with White Decoration) of Military Merit (1944)
- Other work: Director General of the Civil Guard (1939–1942)

Eliseo Álvarez-Arenas Romero (14 June 1882 – 8 July 1966) was a Spanish military officer who participated in the Rif War and the Spanish Civil War, commanding several military units. During the Francoist regime he held important positions, being Director General of the Civil Guard between 1939 and 1942.

== Biography ==
He was born in the town of Alcázar de San Juan in La Mancha.

During the first years of his military career he served in Africa, participating in the Rif War. He was stationed in the Regulares forces, composed of native Moroccans. By 1924 he already held the rank of lieutenant colonel and directed the Tabor of Regulares of Ceuta. After the proclamation of the Second Spanish Republic, in 1932 he rose to the rank of brigadier general.

=== Civil War ===
At the time of the Spanish coup of July 1936, he was commander of the 9th Infantry Brigade based in Zaragoza and dependent on the V Organic Division. After joining the Nationalist faction, he cooperated effectively with his superior officer, General Miguel Cabanellas, to take control of the Aragonese capital and undertake repression against Republican and worker organizations. He was later appointed military governor of Logroño and commander of the 12th Infantry Brigade, shortly after assuming command of the VI Organic Division and the military forces of the provinces of Biscay, Álava, Burgos and Palencia. In Álava he managed to conquer several key positions, and also managed to stop several assaults by the Republican forces of the Northern Front on the fronts of Villareal and Espinosa de los Monteros, leaving this position on 11 December.

In January 1937 he was appointed military commander of Melilla and head of the Eastern Constituency of Morocco, a position he held until December 1938. During his period of command there were some 117 executions in the city. He was also in charge of recruiting and organizing Moroccan mercenary units, which he sent to the Iberian Peninsula, where they played an important role on the battle fronts. During the course of the war he became director of the Granada Infantry Academy, created for the training of military commanders. In December 1938 he was appointed Undersecretary of Public Order.

In the context of the Catalonia Offensive, following the fall of Barcelona on 26 January 1939 he went to the city as Captain General of Catalonia, to take command of the occupation forces. When Minister of Propaganda, Dionisio Ridruejo, arrived in Barcelona with the idea of holding several political rallies, Álvarez-Arenas did not give him authorization for them to be held and told Ridruejo that the most important thing was to "restore the altars of the city". Shortly thereafter, on 28 February, he was promoted to the rank of major general. In July he would leave his post in Barcelona and briefly assume command of the V Military Region, based in Zaragoza.

=== Francoist dictatorship ===
In September 1939, the recently restructured government of Francisco Franco appointed him Inspector General of the Civil Guard. During his mandate, in March 1940, the merger of the Carabineros within the Civil Guard took place, and the title of Director General was reinstated for the leadership of the body. (Note: A decree of 5 April 1940 reinstated the title of Director General.) He also proceeded to relentless repression and purification of the body, expelling all elements not considered attached to the Francoist regime. He left the position in April 1942.

In 1942 he was appointed Captain General of Valencia and commander of the III Military Region.

Later he was a member of the Supreme Council of Military Justice (Consejo Supremo de Justicia Militar, CSJM).

== Bibliography ==
- Alía Miranda, Francisco; del Valle Calzado, Ángel Ramón; Morales Encinas, Olga M. (2008). La guerra civil en Castilla-La Mancha, 70 años después (in Spanish). Cuenca: Servicio de Publicaciones de la Universidad de Castilla-La Mancha.
- Álvarez, José E. (2001). Betrothed of Death, The: The Spanish Foreign Legion During the Rif Rebellion 1920–1927. London: Greenwood. ISBN 0-313-30697-4.
- Cabanellas, Guillermo (1975). La guerra de los mil días: nacimiento, vida y muerte de la II República Española (in Spanish). Vol. II. Buenos Aires: Heliasta.
- Clara, Josep (2000). Epistolari de Josep Cartañà, bisbe de Girona (1934–1963) (in Catalan). Publicacions de l'Abadia de Montserrat.
- Clark, Clyde L. (1950). The evolution of the Franco regime. Appendix: significant legislation in the evolution of the Franco regime. US State Department.
- De Arce Robledo, Carlos (1998). Los generales de Franco (in Spanish). Seuba Ediciones.
- Díez Puertas, Emeterio (2002). El montaje del franquismo. La política cinematográfica de las fuerzas sublevadas (in Spanish). Laertes.
- Martínez de Baños, Fernando (2007). El Maquis. Una cultura del exilio español (in Spanish). Delsan Ediciones.
- Moga Romero, Vicente (2004). Las heridas de la historia: testimonios de la guerra civil española en Melilla (in Spanish). Bellaterra.
- Puig, Jaime J. (1984). Historia de la Guardia Civil (in Spanish). Editorial Mitre.
- Ruiz Marín, Julián (1998). Crónica de Zaragoza año por año. Tomo II (1921–1939) (in Spanish). Librería General.
- Saiz-Pardo, Melchor (1996). Granada sitiada, 1936–1939 (in Spanish). Editorial Comares.
- Thomas, Hugh (2001). The Spanish Civil War. London: Penguin Books.

Military offices
| Preceded by Francisco Llano de la Encomienda (1936) | Captain General of Catalonia; January–July 1939 | Succeeded by Luis Orgaz Yoldi |
Government offices
| Preceded by Emilio Fernández Pérez | Director General of the Civil Guard; 6 September 1939 – 13 April 1942 | Succeeded by Enrique Cánovas Lacruz |
