= Ángel Ramírez de Cartagena y Marcaida =

Spanish military officer (1901–1977)

- Born: Ángel Ramírez de Cartagena y Marcaida; 24 September 1901; Algeciras
- Died: 20 August 1977 (aged 75); Málaga
- Military career
- Allegiance: Kingdom of Spain; Spanish Republic; Nationalist Spain; Nazi Germany
- Branch: Spanish Army; German Army (Wehrmacht)
- Rank: Lieutenant general
- Units: Spanish Legion; Blue Division
- Conflicts: Rif War; Spanish Civil War; World War II
- Awards: See awards section
- Other work: Director General of the Civil Guard (1966–1967)

Ángel Ramírez de Cartagena y Marcaida (24 September 1901 – 20 August 1977) was a Spanish military officer, lieutenant general of the Spanish Army and Director General of the Civil Guard during the Francoist regime.

== Biography ==
=== Military career ===
Ramírez de Cartagena entered the Toledo Infantry Academy at the age of 17 in 1918.

==== Rif War ====
In 1921, Ramírez de Cartagena left the academy as second lieutenant in infantry and was assigned to the Vergara Regiment No. 57, serving in Melilla. In 1923 he was promoted to lieutenant and his assignment was the Badajoz Infantry Regiment No. 73, participating in the Rif War. In 1926 he was assigned to take the light combat tank course. After completing the course in 1928, he was promoted to captain and continued in the Badajoz Infantry Regiment No. 73. In 1934 he was assigned to the Infantry Regiment No. 10, and the following year, he was assigned to the Melilla Cazadores Battalion No. 3, and later in 1936 he was assigned to the Ceuta Cazadores Battalion No. 7.

==== Civil War ====
Ramírez de Cartagena joined the Nationalist faction in the Civil War, being assigned to the Machine Gun Battalion No. 4. Shortly after he was sent to the Sanjurjo Bandera, and when this was dissolved he was assigned to the Spanish Legion. On 25 August 1937, while being captain of the Infantry of the Second Tercio of the Legion in the Aragon campaign, he was seriously wounded. As captain in the 15th Bandera of the Legion on 23 May 1938, the Spanish Republican Army began an offensive on the Sort front (Lérida) and he was in charge of defending the Mogote de Piedras de Aolo position. The offensive lasted until 30 May 30, when the Republican troops withdrew without being able to take that position. From 22 to 24 July 1938, he withstood the attacks of the Republican Army in the Valadredo position despite being wounded, and for this he was awarded the Military Medal. In 1938 he was promoted to commander and he was given command of the 17th Bandera, which fought in Catalonia.

==== World War II ====
Ramírez de Cartagena participated in World War II, as a member of the Blue Division (Spanish: División Azul, German: Blaue Division), or the 250th Infantry Division of the German Wehrmacht, the unit of Spanish volunteers sent to fight alongside the Axis powers against the Soviet Union on the Eastern Front; he was commander of the III Battalion of the 26th Regiment.

==== Francoist period ====
In 1943 Ramírez de Cartagena was promoted to lieutenant colonel for war merits, was an aide-de-camp to the Captain General of the I Military Region and in 1951 he was assigned to the Mehallas Group. Being promoted to colonel, in 1952 he was assigned to command the Tercio Duque de Alba II of the Legion, in Dar Riffien (Tétouan). He was promoted to brigadier general in 1957, and later served as Subinspector of the Legion. In 1961 he was promoted to divisional general of infantry and appointed commander of the Armoured Division No. 1 "Brunete". He was promoted to lieutenant general in 1965 and appointed Captain General of the VIII Military Region. He was appointed Director General of the Civil Guard from 14 January 1966 to 21 September 1967, when he left office.

== Awards ==
- Individual Military Medal (1938)
- Cross (with White Decoration) of Military Merit, 1st class (1945 and 1955)
- Grand Cross of the Royal and Military Order of Saint Hermenegild (1957)
- Grand Cross (with White Decoration) of Military Merit (1958)

== Bibliography ==
- Mazarrasa, Javier de (1993). Corazón, cañones, corazas: División Acorazada Brunete no. 1 : cincuenta años de historia (in Spanish). ISBN 9788460615538.

Government offices
Preceded by Luis Zanón Aldalur	Director General of the Civil Guard; 14 January 1966 – 21 September 1967	Succeeded by Antonio Cores Fernández de Cañete
