= Carlos Iniesta Cano =

Spanish military officer

- Born: 13 May 1908; Madrid
- Died: 6 August 1990 (aged 82); Madrid
- Military career
- Allegiance: Kingdom of Spain (1926–1931); Spanish Republic (1931–1936); Nationalist Spain (1936–1978)
- Branch: Spanish Army
- Service years: 1926–78
- Rank: Lieutenant general
- Unit: Regulares
- Conflicts: Spanish Civil War
- Awards: See awards section
- Other work: Spanish ambassador to Algeria (1970–1972); Director General of the Civil Guard (1972–1974)

Carlos Iniesta Cano (13 May 1908 – 6 August 1990) was a Spanish military officer, lieutenant general of the Spanish Army and Director General of the Civil Guard during the late Francoist regime.

== Biography ==
Iniesta was born on 13 May 1908 in Madrid. He entered the Toledo Infantry Academy at the age of 15, achieving the rank of second lieutenant of infantry in 1926. He served for 8 years in the Spanish protectorate in Morocco, in the Grupo de Regulares de Tétouan No.1.

=== Civil War ===
At the start of the Spanish Civil War, with the rank of lieutenant, Iniesta requested entry into the Spanish Legion, serving in the fourth banner that was part of the 13th Division (also known as "the Black Hand") and participating in the advance on Madrid and also in the fighting at the University City. He distinguished himself on several occasions, earning several decorations and reaching the rank of commander. During the conflict he was taken prisoner on one occasion but managed to escape.

=== Francoist period ===
In 1946 Iniesta obtained the diploma of General Staff officer. Between 1949 and 1955 he was stationed at the Spanish Embassy in Washington, D.C. He was promoted to colonel in 1959. Between 1964 and 1967 he was director of the General Military Academy in Zaragoza. Later he served as military governor of Huesca and military governor of Madrid, where he stood out for his tenacious opposition to student movements against the regime of Francisco Franco.

In July 1970 he was appointed Spanish ambassador to Algeria, leaving office in 1972. Promoted to lieutenant general and appointed Director General of Civil Guard, serving in that position between 21 January 1972 and 13 May 1974. In the reserve since 1978, he died in 1990 as a result of a pulmonary embolism after suffering from pulmonary emphysema and circulatory problems.

He was president of the Brotherhood of Former Legionary Knights. Member of the National Council of the Movement and the National Confederation of Ex-Combatants, he was considered a prominent member of the military part of the immobilist sector of the regime during the late Francoist period, the so-called Búnker.

He was procurator in the Spanish Cortes between 1967 and 1977. He was one of the 59 procurators who, on 18 November 1976, voted against the Political Reform Act that repealed the Fundamental Principles of the Movement.

== Works ==
- (in Spanish) Memorias y recuerdos, Editorial Planeta, Barcelona 1984.

== Awards ==
- Grand Cross of the Royal and Military Order of Saint Hermenegild (1964)
- Grand Cross (with White Decoration) of Military Merit (1966)
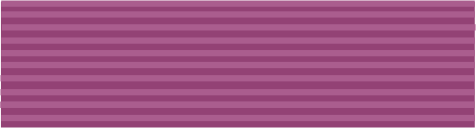
- Grand Cross of the Order of Cisneros (1969)
- Grand Cross of the Order of Civil Merit (1972)
- Grand Cross (with White Decoration) of Aeronautical Merit (1972)
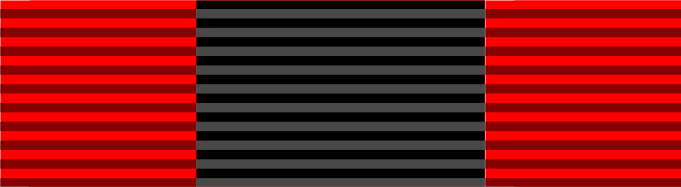
- Grand Cross of the Imperial Order of the Yoke and Arrows (1974)

== Bibliography ==
- Preston, Paul (1995) [1990]. The Politics of Revenge: Fascism and the Military in 20th-century Spain. London and New York City: Routledge. ISBN 0-203-40037-2.

Government offices
Preceded by Luis Díez-Alegría	Director General of the Civil Guard; 21 January 1972 – 13 May 1974	Succeeded by José Miguel Vega Rodríguez
Diplomatic posts
Preceded by José Luis de los Arcos y Elío	Spanish Ambassador to Algeria; 24 July 1970 – 21 January 1972	Succeeded by José Ramón Sobredo Rioboo
