= List of directors general of the Civil Guard (Spain) =

Director General of the Civil Guard
- Director General de la Guardia Civil
- Emblem of the Civil Guard

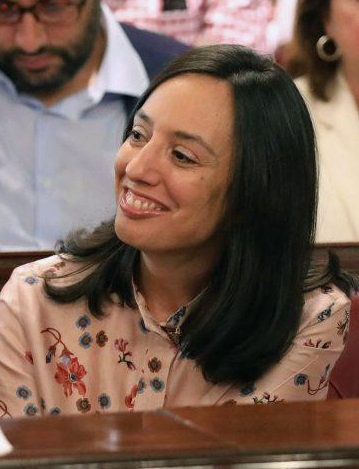
- Incumbent; Mercedes González Fernández since 28 March 2023
- Ministry of the Interior; Secretariat of State for Security; Civil Guard
- Style: The Most Excellent (formal); Mr. Director General (informal)
- Abbreviation: DGC
- Reports to: The secretary of state for security
- Nominator: The minister of the interior
- Appointer: The monarch
- Formation: 2 September 1844; 182 years ago
- First holder: Francisco Javier Girón
- Deputy: Deputy Director of Operations; Lt. Gen. Ángel Gozalo Martín
- Website: Civil Guard website

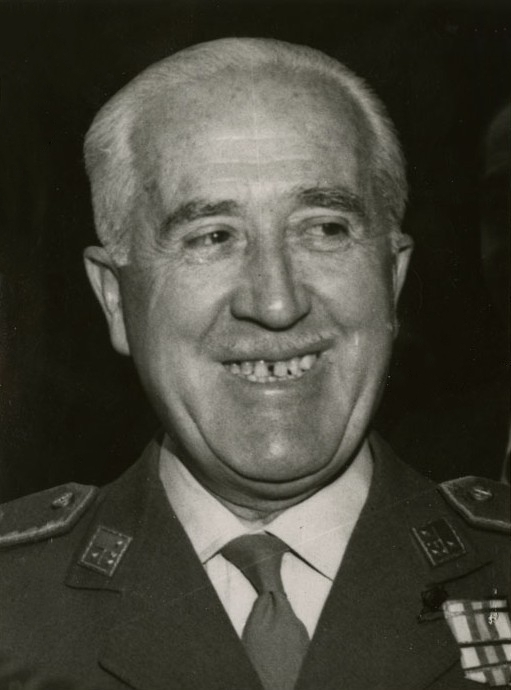
General Camilo Alonso Vega, longest-serving Director General of the Civil Guard (1943–1955).

This article lists the directors general of the Civil Guard, the national gendarmerie and a law enforcement agency of Spain.

The director general is the official of the Ministry of the Interior who commands the Civil Guard, and heads the Directorate-General of the Civil Guard.

== List ==
Name	Appointed	Dismissed	Notes
Francisco Javier Girón	2 September 1844	10 July 1854	1st term.
Antonio María Alós	18 July 1854	1 August 1854	
Facundo Infante Chaves	1 August 1854	19 July 1856	
José MacCrohon y Blake	1 September 1856	12 October 1856	
Francisco Javier Girón	12 October 1856	1 July 1858	2nd term.
Isidoro de Hoyos y Rubín de Celis	2 July 1858	21 November 1863	1st term.
Ángel García-Loygorri y García de Tejada	29 September 1864	25 June 1865	
Isidoro de Hoyos y Rubín de Celis	25 June 1865	28 December 1865	2nd term.
Francisco Serrano Bedoya	28 December 1865	11 July 1866	1st term.
Rafael Acedo Rico y Amat	11 July 1866	11 March 1867	
José Antonio Turón y Prats	11 March 1867	16 September 1868	1st term.
Anselmo Blaser y San Martín	16 September 1868	26 September 1868	Glorious Revolution.
Juan Antonio de Zaratiegui y Zeliqueta	26 September 1868	25 October 1868	
Francisco Serrano Bedoya	25 October 1868	18 June 1872	2nd term.
Cándido Pieltain y Jove-Huergo	19 June 1872	26 March 1873	Proclamation of the First Spanish Republic (11 February 1873).
Mariano Socías del Fangar y Lledó	5 July 1873	19 September 1873	
Juan Acosta Muñoz	19 September 1873	10 October 1873	
Segundo de la Portilla Gutiérrez	10 October 1873	18 January 1874	
José Antonio Turón y Prats	18 January 1874	28 September 1874	2nd term.
Fernando Cotoner y Chacón	28 September 1874	21 January 1882	Restoration of the monarchy (29 December 1874).
Tomás García-Cervino y López de Sigüenza	23 January 1882	5 November 1883	1st term.
Agustín de Burgos y Llamas	5 November 1883	26 April 1884	
Ramón Fajardo Izquierdo	26 April 1884	4 August 1884	
Remigio Moltó y Díaz-Berrio	6 August 1884	9 December 1885	
Tomás García-Cervino y López-Sigüenza	9 December 1885	3 December 1887	2nd term.
José Chinchilla y Díez de Oñate	13 January 1888	11 December 1888	1st term.
Thomás O'Ryan y Vázquez	11 December 1888	13 November 1890	
Luis Dabán y Ramírez de Arellano	14 November 1890	22 January 1892	
Romualdo Palacio González	30 January 1892	8 February 1899	
José Chinchilla y Díez de Oñate	8 February 1899	2 March 1899	2nd term.
Antonio Dabán y Ramírez de Arellano	16 March 1899	27 July 1901	
Federico Ochando	27 July 1901	30 August 1902	
Luis de Pando y Sánchez	30 August 1902	13 July 1903	
Camilo García de Polavieja	13 July 1903	23 November 1903	
Arsenio Linares y Pombo	23 November 1903	6 December 1903	
Vicente Martitegui	7 December 1903	28 January 1905	1st term.
Joaquín Sánchez Gómez	28 January 1905	25 August 1910	
Vicente Martitegui	25 August 1910	25 January 1912	2nd term.
Ángel Aznar y Butigieg	31 January 1912	3 March 1913	
Ramón Echagüe y Méndez Vigo	3 March 1913	30 October 1913	
Agustín de Luque y Coca	30 October 1913	10 December 1915	1st term.
Enrique de Orozco	10 December 1915	23 July 1916	
Antonio Tovar y Marcoleta	23 July 1916	20 April 1917	
Agustín de Luque y Coca	20 April 1917	26 June 1917	2nd term
Salvador Arizón y Sánchez Fano	26 June 1917	6 December 1918	
Juan Zubia y Bassecourt	6 December 1918	26 March 1925	
Ricardo Burguete Lana	27 March 1925	3 November 1928	
José Sanjurjo	3 November 1928	3 February 1932	Proclamation of the Second Spanish Republic (14 April 1931).
Miguel Cabanellas	3 February 1932	15 August 1932	1st term.
Cecilio Bedia de la Cavallería	15 August 1932	15 February 1935	Asturian Revolution of 1934.
Miguel Cabanellas	15 February 1935	7 January 1936	2nd term.
Sebastián Pozas Perea	7 January 1936	24 July 1936	Remained loyal to the Republic following the Spanish coup of July 1936.
Spanish Civil War (Note: During the Spanish Civil War, the leadership of the Civil Guard was split between the warring factions. Within the Republican faction, General José Sanjurjo y Rodríguez de Arias assumed the leadership, until the reconstitution of the body into the National Republican Guard. Within the Nationalist faction, General Federico de la Cruz Boullosa temporarily assumed the position of Inspector General, being succeeded by generals Marcial Barro García (1936–1937), Ricardo Serrador Santés (1937) and Emilio Fernández Pérez (1937–1939).)
Eliseo Álvarez-Arenas Romero	6 September 1939	13 April 1942	Integration of the Carabineros into the Civil Guard (1940).
Enrique Cánovas Lacruz	13 April 1942	1 July 1943	
Camilo Alonso Vega	24 July 1943	30 May 1955	Longest-serving Director General of the Civil Guard.
Pablo Martín Alonso	30 June 1955	8 February 1957	
Eduardo Sáenz de Buruaga	8 February 1957	23 April 1959	
Antonio Alcubilla Pérez	23 April 1959	7 December 1962	Creation of the Traffic Grouping (1959).
Luis Zanón Aldalur	10 December 1962	31 December 1965	
Ángel Ramírez de Cartagena y Marcaida	14 January 1966	21 September 1967	
Antonio Cores Fernández de Cañete	6 October 1967	22 January 1969	
Luis Díez-Alegría	7 March 1969	13 January 1972	
Carlos Iniesta Cano	21 January 1972	13 May 1974	Assassination of Luis Carrero Blanco (20 December 1973).
José Miguel Vega Rodríguez	17 May 1974	10 October 1975	
Ángel Campano López	10 October 1975	23 December 1976	Death of Francisco Franco (20 November 1975) and the Montejurra massacre (9 May 1976).
Antonio Ibáñez Freire	23 December 1976	2 May 1978	1977 Atocha massacre.
Carlos Oliete Sánchez	2 May 1978	2 July 1979	
Pedro Fontenla Fernández	2 July 1979	19 April 1980	
José Luis Aramburu Topete	24 April 1980	26 October 1983	1981 coup attempt (23F), led by Lt. Col. Antonio Tejero of the Civil Guard.
José Antonio Sáenz de Santa María	2 November 1983	3 October 1986	
Luis Roldán	31 October 1986	3 December 1993	
Ferrán Cardenal de Alemany	3 December 1993	7 May 1996	
Santiago López Valdivielso	7 May 1996	30 April 2004	2004 Madrid train bombings.
Carlos Gómez Arruche	30 April 2004	28 April 2006	
Joan Mesquida Ferrando	28 April 2006	21 April 2008	Unified command of the National Police Corps and the Civil Guard. Simultaneously served as the Director General of the Police.
Francisco Javier Velázquez	21 April 2008	31 December 2011	Unified command of the National Police Corps and the Civil Guard. Simultaneously served as the Director General of the Police.
Arsenio Fernández de Mesa	3 January 2012	18 November 2016	
José Manuel Holgado Merino	18 November 2016	29 June 2018	2017 Barcelona attacks and the 2017–2018 constitutional crisis.
Félix Vicente Azón Vilas	29 June 2018	18 January 2020	
María Gámez Gámez	18 January 2020	28 March 2023	First woman to hold this office.
Mercedes González Fernández	28 March 2023	Incumbent	

== Bibliography ==
- Cabanellas, Guillermo (1977). Cuatro generales: La Lucha por el poder [Four Generals: The Struggle for Power] (in Spanish). Vol. III. Barcelona: Editorial Planeta.
- Clark, Clyde L. (1950). The evolution of the Franco regime. Appendix: significant legislation in the evolution of the Franco regime. US State Department.
- Clemente, Mariano (1995). Ejército y conflictos civiles en la España contemporánea [Army and civil conflicts in contemporary Spain] (in Spanish). Ediciones Fundamentos.
- Silva Amador, Lorenzo (2010). Sereno en el peligro: La aventura histórica de la Guardia Civil [Serene in danger: The historical adventure of the Civil Guard] (in Spanish). Madrid: Edaf. ISBN 978-84-414-2643-6.
- Orella, José Luis (2001). La formación del Estado nacional durante la Guerra civil española [The formation of the national state during the Spanish Civil War] (in Spanish). Actas.
