= Bernardo O'Connor =

Bernardo O'Connor y Ophaly, (Strasbourg, (5 March 1696 – Madrid, 29 March 1780), first Count of Ofalia, was a Spanish-Irish General.

== Biography ==
Spanish General O'Connor was a descendant of what is usually described in Irish history as the Flight of the Wild Geese at the end of the 17th century.

He fought in the Irish regiment and participated in the Spanish conquest of Oran (1732). He reached the rank of Lieutenant-Colonel in 1741, Brigadier in September 1745 and Mariscal de campo in April 1747.

He was a military governor of Tortosa (1745), Pamplona (1760) and Barcelona (1761).

He was also interim Captain General of Catalonia (1767 and 1772-1773), In agreement with his predecessor, Ambrosio de Funes Villalpando, then Secretary of War, he attempted to implement the lottery for military service, which had been voluntary until then. This caused serious incidents in Barcelona (the Quintes riot), which forced Ambrosio de Funes Villalpando to dismiss him.

He became Captain General of Castilla la Vieja (1773) and of Granada (1774).

He was created Count of Ofalia in 1776 by King Charles III of Spain, in remembrance of the Baronetcy of Ophaly, County Kildare, Ireland, where his family came from.

Bernardo O'Connor never married and had no children.

His title was inherited by Felix Maria de Salabert-O'Brien, the son of a grand niece of Bernard O'Connor. Felix Maria de Salabert was in his own right, 5th Marqués de la Torrecilla (es), title by King Charles II of Spain awarded on 25 September 1688, and 6th Marqués de Valdeolmos (es), title awarded also by King Charles II on 3 July 1687.

== Sources ==
- Real Academia de la Historia
- Enciclopedia Catalana
