= GREIM =

Coat of arms of the GREIMs

The Mountain Rescue and Intervention Groups (Spanish: Grupos de Rescate e Intervención en Montaña, GREIM) are the special units of the Spanish Civil Guard focused on mountain and cave rescue, and, in general, all the police work in mountain conditions.

== History ==
=== The Skiing-Climbing Groups ===
After the Spanish Civil War, under the Law of 15 March 1940, the Carabineros Corps charged with protecting the borders against smuggling became part of the Civil Guard. Border Commands were set up, responsible for sealing the Pyrenees and the Spanish-Portuguese border. During the first years of their existence, the Commands were faced with incursions by Maquis who infiltrated with subversive propaganda and material for use in acts of sabotage inside Spanish territory.

The only way to establish effective surveillance over the border was by training the forces in skiing, so that the Civil Guard could keep watch on the border passes during the winter. Beginning in 1945, the members of the 223rd Border Command of Jaca, who patrolled the Aragonese Pyrenees, attended ski instruction organized by the 51st and 52nd divisions of the army.

In 1954 the training program was removed from army oversight, and ski courses began at the Civil Guard barracks at Coll de Ladrones in the Aragon Valley, attended by members of the Border Commands of Pamplona, Tremp, and Figueras, which, together with the Jaca command, provided full coverage for the Pyrenees border.

By 1967 the sport of mountaineering was recovering after the hiatus resulting from the Civil War. The emerging Spanish middle class were starting to enjoy the natural beauty of the mountains, and began suffering accidents. Since 1956 the Mountain Aid Groups of the Spanish Mountaineering Federation (FEM) had been doing a commendable job of rescuing accident victims, but their performance was hampered because channels of communication were poor, and because they needed permission to do their work, as the people giving aid were not professionally qualified.

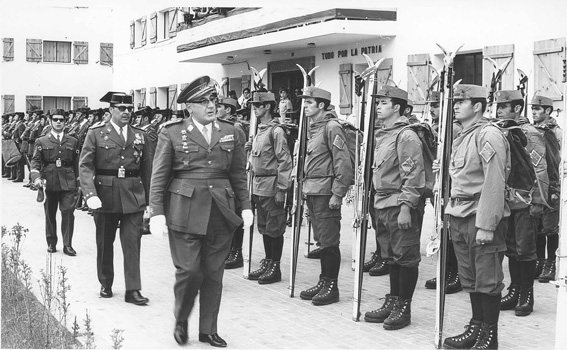
Ski units in Jaca, 1973

On 11 March 1967 the official bulletin of the Civil Guard announced the creation of the specialty of Skier-Climber. The first course would be held at Coll de Ladrones, with a module in skiing and a module in climbing. Both modules would include experience in rescue and first aid.

The initial deployment in September 1967 had little success, since the guards were intended to remain in their bases and come to the rescue only when accidents occurred, without a period of training and maintenance of their level of expertise.

This first unsuccessful attempt led the commanders of the Civil Guard to reconsider. They brought together the first-trained specialists in three new units, which were established on 1 November 1968 in Jaca and Boltaña – both in the province of Huesca - and in Granada province.

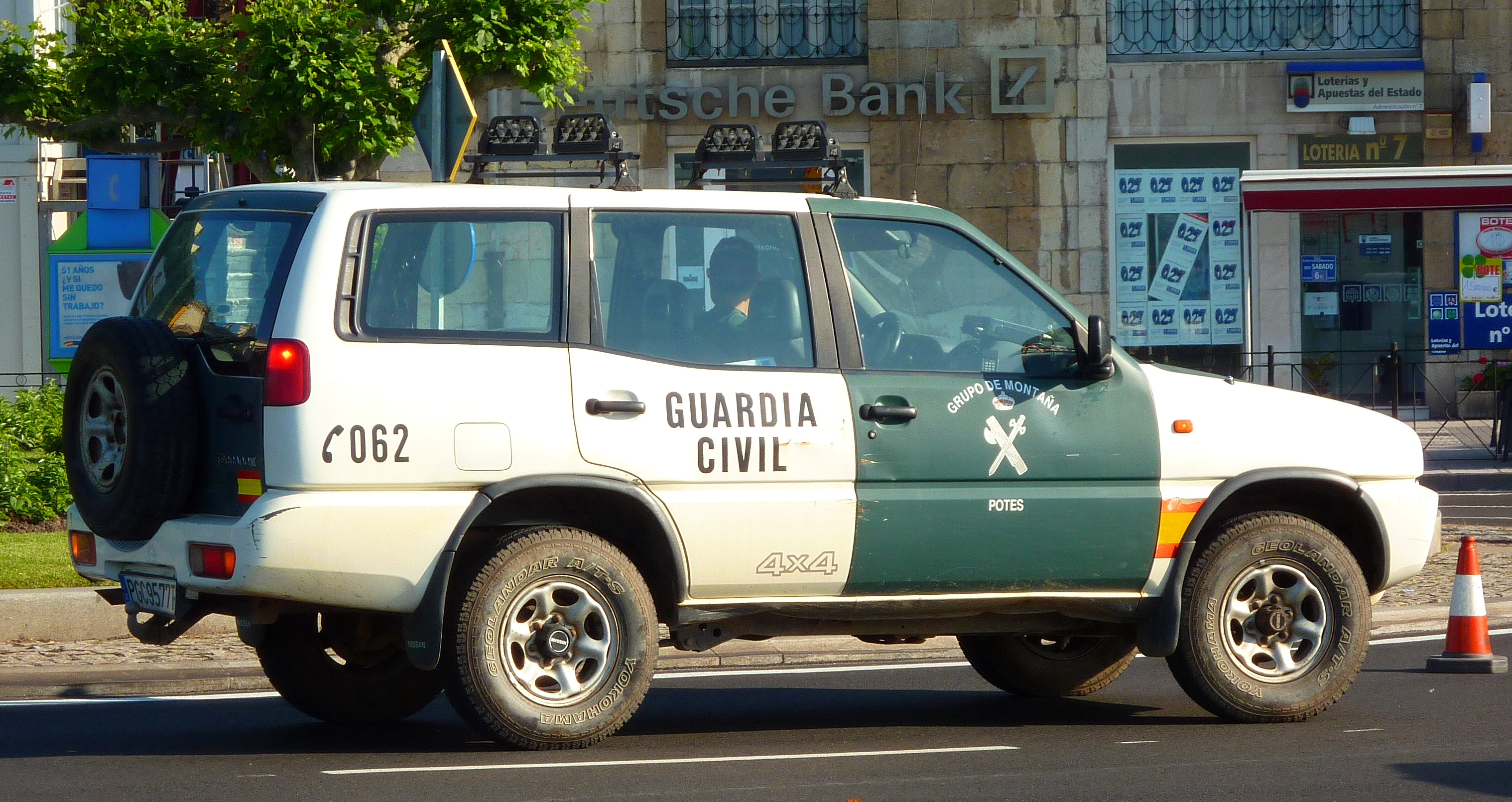
Nissan Terrano II with mountings for skis, on the roof of the GREIM base at Potes (Cantabria).

=== The development of the modern Mountain Service ===
Under pressure from Spanish and French mountaineers to provide a rescue service equal to that of the French Gendarmerie, in 1981 the Civil Guard service was reorganised and GREIM units were set up in all the main mountain areas of Spain. A training school (CAEM) and a national inspectorate were established.

In the early 1990s the present-day Mountain Service took shape, employing about 250 Civil Guards and making use if the Guard helicopter units. In 1992 the International Commission for Alpine Rescue acclaimed the Mountain Service as one of the four best in the world, together with those of France, Switzerland and Austria.

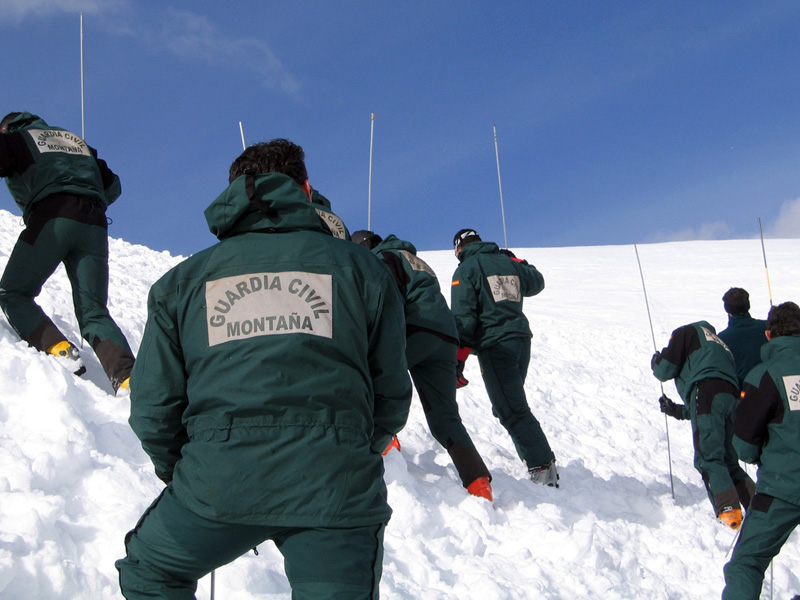
Rescue of a climber buried in an avalanche

== Functions ==
The tasks assigned to the Civil Guard Mountain Service are as follows:

- To render assistance to persons who are the victims of accidents, lost, or cut off in the mountains or places difficult to access.
- To ensure compliance with the regulations for natural and environmental conservation in the mountains.
- To enforce security and compliance with legislation in force in the areas where they work.
- To monitor, control and maintain public order on ski slopes, including during mountain sports competitions.

== Composition ==
Although these Civil Guard units have been generally known as GREIM, in fact the units are currently of several types: SEREIM (Sección de Montaña), made up of about 15 specialists under the command of a Civil Guard officer; GREIM (Grupo de Montaña), made up of about 11 specialists under the command of a non-commissioned officer; and EREIM (Equipo de Montaña), made up of 5 or 6 specialists under the command of a corporal. The units are based in all mountain areas of the Spanish mainland and islands.

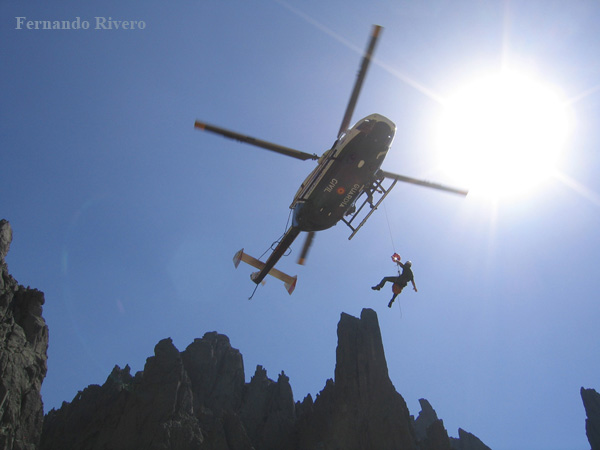
Helicopter evacuation in Los Galayos-Gredos

== Organisation ==
=== Central formations ===
The following units are under the control of GREIM headquarters, under the command of a Civil Guard Colonel:

==== Special Mountain Unit (Unidad Especial de Montaña) ====
This provides advice to the Head of the Service; specialist support to other units; research and development of new techniques, ways of working and equipment.

==== Competitions Team ====
This team has existed since 1960 to represent the Service at mountain sports events. Members have represented Spain in recent Winter Olympics. There are permanent cross-country biathlon and ski-mountaineering teams based at Jaca, and a downhill-skiing team is formed each year for the Military Ski Championships.

==== Mountain Expedition Group (Grupo Alpinístico Expedicionario) ====
This was formed in 1999 to allay the concerns of Civil Guard specialists who undertake mountaineering in other countries. The group has climbed peaks in Peru (Huascarán, Artesonraju, etc.), Chilean Patagonia ( Torres del Brujo) and the Himalayas ((Cho Oyu and Everest).

==== Specialist Training Centre (CAEM) ====
This centre, under a qualified Civil Guard commander, is responsible for specialist education of mountain service personnel. It is located at Candanchú (Huesca). The training program lasts 10 months and includes Survival and Movement in the Mountains, Caving, Cave Rescue, Rock-face Rescue, Topography, Downhill and Mountain Skiing, Rock- and Ice-Climbing, and Mountain Sports, as well as first-aid training. This is the only centre in Spain to provide mountain-rescue training recognised internationally by the International Commission for Alpine Rescue.

The centre has provided training for mountain service staff from other countries, and works together with the French Gendarmerie and the Italian Carabinieri. Staff from the Fire and Civil Defence staff receive training there, as do medical doctors taking the CUEMUM course in mountain medicine.

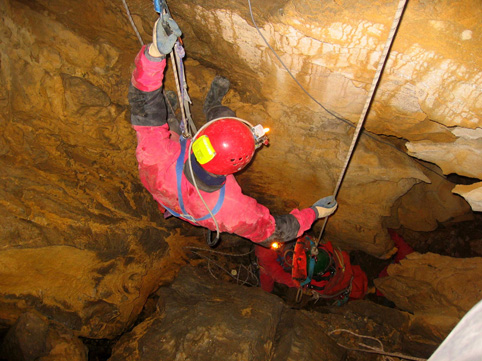
Cave rescue

=== Territorial formations ===
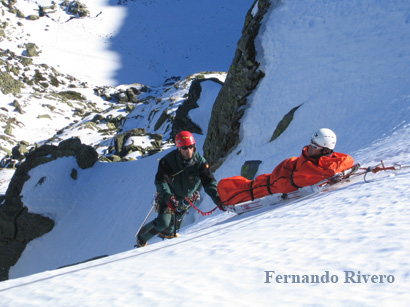
GREIM from Barco de Ávila carries out a rescue on an ice slope

The service is organised territorially in five areas, corresponding to the main mountain areas of Spain. Each area is commanded by a Civil Guard lieutenant or second lieutenant, and comprises the SEREIM, GREIM and EREIM units distributed as follows:

- Jaca area
  - Jaca SEREIM
  - Boltaña GREIM
  - Benasque GREIM
  - Roncal GREIM
  - Pamplona GREIM
  - Huesca EREIM
  - Panticosa EREIM
  - Tarazona EREIM
  - Mora de Rubielos EREIM
- Cangas de Onís area
  - Cangas de Onís SEREIM
  - Mieres GREIM
  - Potes GREIM
  - Sabero GREIM
  - A Pobra de Trives EREIM
- Navacerrada area:
  - Navacerrada SEREIM
  - El Barco de Ávila GREIM
  - Arenas de San Pedro EREIM
  - Riaza EREIM
  - Ezcaray EREIM
- Granada area
  - Granada SEREIM
  - Palma de Mallorca GREIM
  - Tenerife GREIM
  - Álora EREIM
  - Onteniente EREIM
- Viella area
  - Viella GREIM
  - Puigcerdá EREIM

== Contact ==
A telephone code 062 is provided for emergency calls to any GREIM unit.

== Statistics ==
Between 1981 and 2013 the service carried out 16,607 rescue missions in the mountains, caves and other places difficult of access. In the year 2013 the service attended 892 incidents. It reported 94 deaths and 475 injuries, and assisted another 1,010 people. There were 87 false alarms.
