= Vicente Montávez Aguillaume =

Spanish politician (born 1980)

Member of the Congress of Deputies
- Incumbent
- Assumed office 17 September 2024
- Preceded by: Mercedes González Fernández
- Constituency: Madrid

Personal details
- Born: 26 March 1980 (age 46)
- Party: Spanish Socialist Workers' Party

Vicente Montávez Aguillaume (born 26 March 1980) is a Spanish politician serving as a member of the Congress of Deputies since 2024. He has served as secretary general of the Spanish Socialist Workers' Party in Puente de Vallecas since 2017.
