= Nature Protection Service (Spain) =

Nature Protection Service Servicio de Protección de la Naturaleza
- Coat of Arms

- Service Badge

- Graduate Course Badge
- Abbreviation: SEPRONA

Agency overview
- Formed: 1988

Jurisdictional structure
- Operations jurisdiction: Spain
- Constituting instrument: Organic Law 2/1986
- Specialist jurisdiction: Environment, parks, heritage property

Operational structure
- Parent agency: Civil Guard

The Nature Protection Service (Spanish: Servicio de Protección de la Naturaleza, SEPRONA) is a unit of the Spanish Civil Guard responsible for nature conservation and management of the hunting and fishing industry. It serves to carry out and oversee State provisions to preserve nature, the environment, water resources, and preserving wealth in hunting, fish farming, forestry and other nature related industries. They are also heavily involved in work against spills and contamination, illegal trade of protected species, unregulated hunting and fishing activities, protection of natural spaces, and prevention and extinction of fires.

== History ==
The idea of SEPRONA dates back to June 7, 1876, where the Spanish monarchy ordered the Civil Guard to take on new security and police objectives, varying from the protection of public mountains, fire prevention, preventing clandestine royalties and other resources. Not until 1986, however, where the State demanded the Civil guard ensure conservation of nature and the environment. Thus in 1988 the Civil Guard created the Servicio Protección de la Naturaleza, or SEPRONA, guaranteeing Spanish citizens the right to a suitable environment as well as the right to preserve the environment. SEPRONA was reorganized again in 2000, and since it is entrusted with the prevention of environmental harm and protection of movable and immovable property listed as historic assets in all the Spanish national territory and its territorial, including sea preservation of protected and endangered species. "Its base of work is very extensive, and its components work with over 2000 laws and decrees in constant and continuous adaptation to both policy changes themselves of the European Union, State, autonomous community and even municipal ordinances, being the specialty of the Civil Guard, which handles more legislation".

== Organization ==
The headquarters of SEPRONA is called Unidad Central Operativa Medioambiental (UCOMA). Because Spain has the largest degree of biodiversity in Europe, the country itself serves as a point of reference in topics regarding nature conservation. This puts a higher amount of environmental responsibility on Spain versus other European countries. About 11.8% of Spain's national territory is conserved by regional or national government.

Each province is accounted for having the following:

1. Technical Office: Which coordinates and supports missions of SEPRONA
2. Teams: investigate and quantify environmental violations.
3. Patrol: Responsible for prevention, monitoring and reporting aggressions.

The responsibilities associated with the Nature Protection Service vary, yet all its purposes serve to better the environment and conserve nature. Aside from the roles mentioned above, SEPRONA is associated with the collaboration with the authorities and bodies concerned to plan and execute an effective policy in a given area. "Since 2002 there is a cooperation agreement between the autonomous community (Ministry of agriculture and water) and the Ministry of the Interior for protection of the nature of the Region teams collaborate on environmental inspection tasks. For its part the autonomous administration contributes, through financial contributions to the improvement of the material means and formation of civil guards involved in the aforementioned teams."

With the collaboration of those local authorities, they work to:

- Promote behaviors of respect for nature.
- Check the status of conservation of water resources (continental and maritime), geological and forestry to prevent any pollution, aggression or abusive use.
- Assist in the prevention of forest fires.
- Protect the atmospheric environment monitoring the degree of pollution and radioactivity level.
- Perform the actions aimed to promote the normal development of the flora and fauna (continental and maritime) and particularly protected species.
- Contribute to the correct use of forestry, hunting and fishing resources.
- Facilitate the proper enjoyment of the natural space preventing activities that can degrade it.
- Create the databases relating to the service.

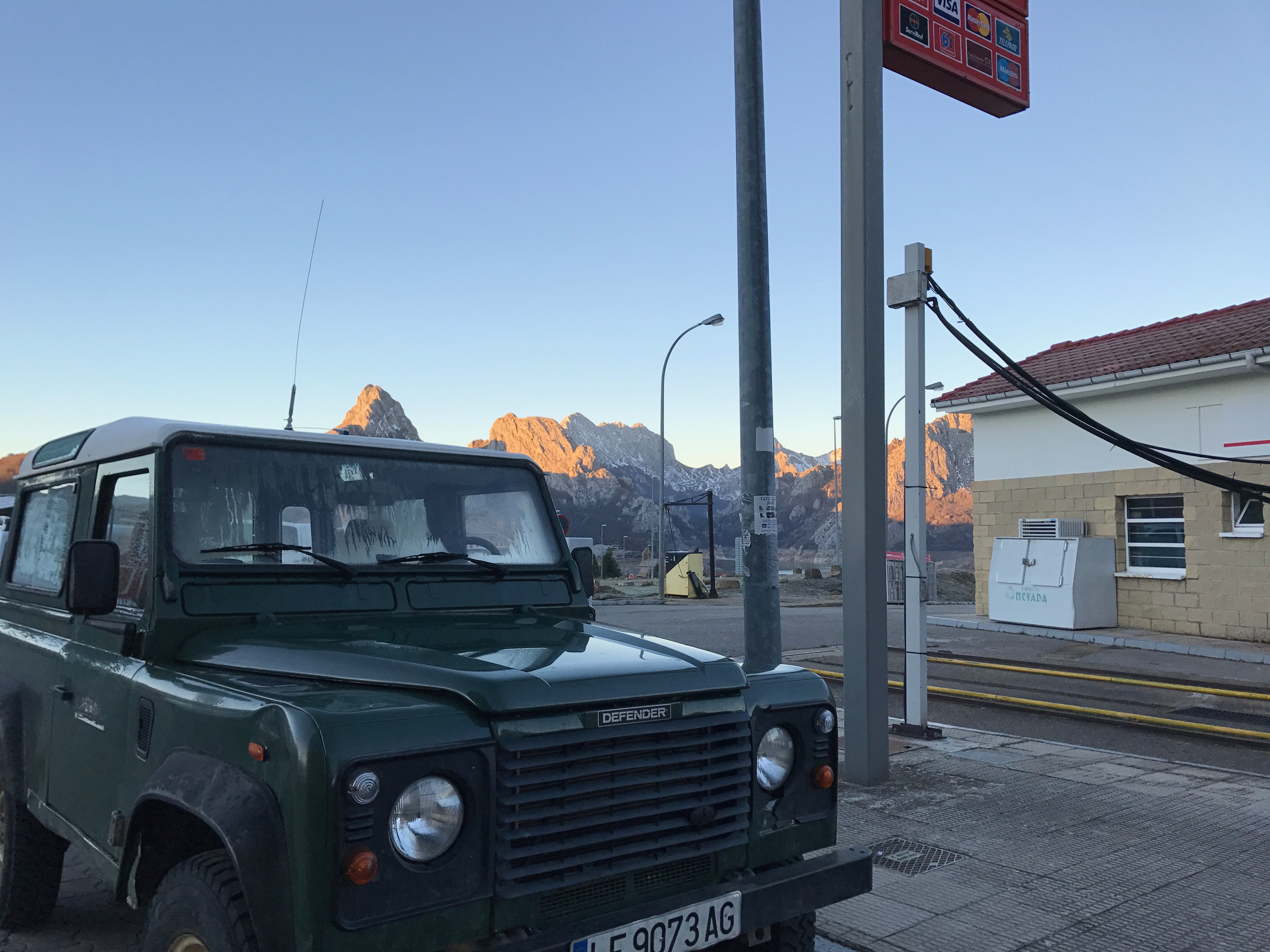
A Land Rover Defender of a Seprona gamekeeper in Riaño

== Effectiveness ==
The following are statistics of SEPRONA's environmental policing from the Ministry of the Interior for the year 2010:

Intervention	Class
3,276	Crimes and Misdemeanors
120,927	Administrative Offensives
27,976	Reports
457	Arrests
900	Charged

Moreover, in 2011 alone SEPRONA arrested more than 300 people on account of violations against the environment. Over 200 people were involved in violations in management of the territory, 72 in forest fires and 10 in illegal trade of exotic species Infringements with the largest number of complaints were for hunting, fishing and possession of protected species laws, and for issues regarding urban, dangerous, radioactive and sanitary residues.

== See also ==
- Hunting in Spain
