= Mercedes González Fernández =

Spanish politician (born 1975)

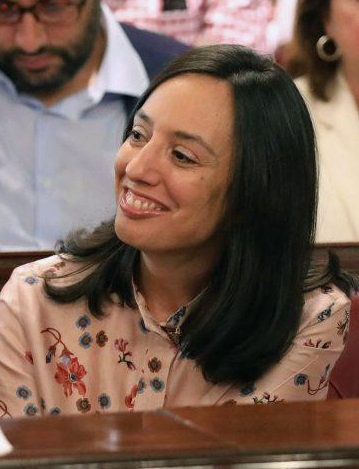
- González in 2018

Director General of the Civil Guard
- Incumbent
- Assumed office 17 September 2024
- Preceded by: Leonardo Marcos González
- In office 28 March 2023 – 14 June 2023
- Preceded by: María Gámez Gámez
- Succeeded by: Leonardo Marcos González

Member of the Congress of Deputies
- In office 17 August 2023 – 17 September 2024
- Succeeded by: Vicente Montávez Aguillaume
- Constituency: Madrid

Personal details
- Born: 2 June 1975 (age 50)
- Party: Spanish Socialist Workers' Party

María de las Mercedes González Fernández (born 2 June 1975) is a Spanish politician. She has served as director general of the Civil Guard since 2024, having previously served from March to June 2023. From 2023 to 2024, she was a member of the Congress of Deputies.
