= Dionisio Ridruejo =

Spanish poet and political figure

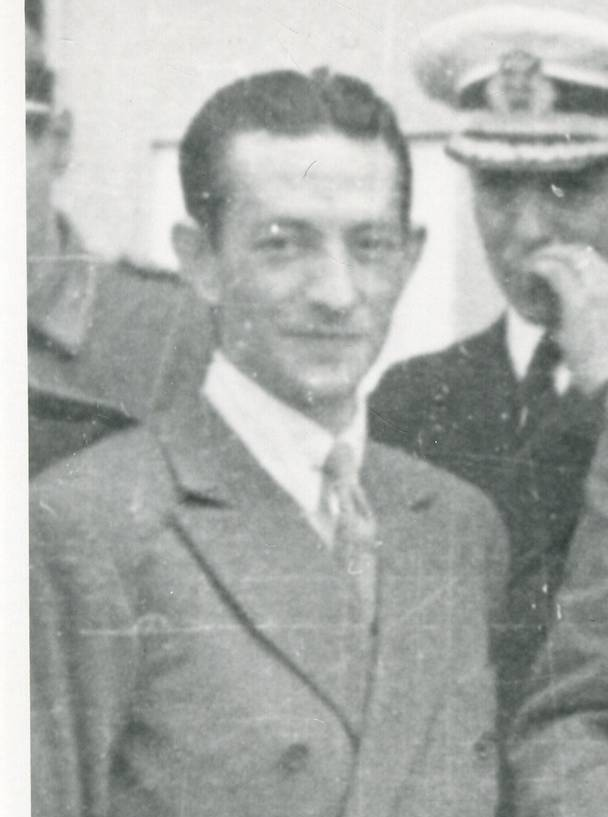
- Born: Dionisio Ridruejo Jiménez; 12 October 1912; Burgo de Osma-Ciudad de Osma
- Died: 29 June 1975 (aged 62); Madrid
- Occupation: Poet
- Known for: Political activist
- Notable work: Cara al Sol, Escrito en España
- Political party: Falange

Dionisio Ridruejo Jiménez (12 October 1912 – 29 June 1975) was a Spanish poet and political figure associated with the Generation of '36 movement and a member of the Falange political party. He was co-author of the words to the Falangist anthem Cara al Sol. In later years he fell from favour with the Francoist State and eventually became associated with opposition groups.

== Falangism ==
Ridruejo was born in Burgo de Osma-Ciudad de Osma. A close friend of Ramón Serrano Suñer, his tireless work as a propagandist, as well as his short stature and swarthy appearance, earned him the early nickname of the "Spanish Joseph Goebbels". Under Serrano Súñer's influence he was appointed as Minister of Propaganda to the cabinet of Francisco Franco in 1938. A strong Falangist and as a result sometimes in conflict with the military tendency within Francoism, he was censured during the Spanish Civil War by General Álvarez-Arenas for producing propaganda leaflets in the Catalan language, with the military elite deciding that Spain's minority languages should be crushed rather than courted.

Ridruejo's uneasiness with the conservative military elements of Franco's government was to prove his undoing. Thus his dismissal from the post of Propaganda Minister was secured in 1941 by his Cabinet colleague Colonel Valentín Galarza Morante after Ridruejo had published an article in Arriba condemning the hold that he felt the Colonel had over Franco. Galarza used his influence to ensure the dismissal of Ridruejo and he would not return to government thereafter. He was also damaged by the fact that he had been active in support of Nazi Germany as other pro-Nazis such as Sancho Dávila y Fernández de Celis and Pedro Gamero del Castillo were dismissed at the same time. Ridruejo volunteered for the Spanish Blue Division sent to fight as part of the German Army on the Eastern Front in Russia. He served from 1941 to 1942 before being invalided out.

== Anti-Franco activity ==
In 1955 the disillusioned Ridruejo set up a semi-clandestine club bringing together 'authentic' Falangists with communists, socialists and democrats (such as Enrique Múgica, Fernando Sánchez Dragó, Ramón Tamames, José María Ruiz Gallardón, and others) in a loose alliance united only by opposition to Francoist Spain. His opposition activity saw him jailed briefly the following year and again in 1957 when he told the Cuban radical journal Bohemia that he was active in the illegal opposition. By this point he had become involved with the Partido Social de Acción Democrática, an illegal opposition group that supported democratisation and a liberal cultural outlook, as well as left-wing economic ideas.

By the early 1960s Ridruejo's opposition activity saw him living in exile in South America. He published his autobiography, Escrito en España in Argentina in 1962 with the book also detailing his conversion from Falangism to social democracy which had occurred around this time. He returned to Spain late in life and died in Madrid in 1975.

== Poetry ==
Ridruejo was a devotee of classical Spanish literature, as well as Dante and Plutarch and he produced poetry in a number of forms, ranging from Garcilaso de la Vega-styled sonnets to blank verse. In the 1940s he was particularly noted for the religious tone of much of his poetry, often giving praise to God for His mercy. His later works are marked by a growing theme of existential angst, inspired by his disillusionment with Franco and his increasingly impoverished circumstances due to his fall from grace.

== See also ==
- Café Gijón (Madrid)
