= Captain General of Catalonia =

The office of Captain General of Catalonia (Spanish: Capitán general de Cataluña; Catalan: Capità general de Catalunya) was created in 1713 by the Nueva Planta decrees of King Philip V of Spain to replace that of Viceroy of Catalonia.

== List of Captains General of Catalonia ==
=== Under Philip V ===
- 1713–1714: Restaino Cantelmo-Stuart
- 1714: James FitzJames, 1st Duke of Berwick
- 1714–1715: Alberto Octavio Tserclaes de Tilly
- 1715–1719: Francisco Pío de Saboya y Moura
- 1719: Antonio del Valle (interim)
- 1720: Francesco Caetano de Aragona
- 1720–1722: Francisco Pío de Saboya y Moura
- 1722–1725: José Carrillo de Albornoz, 1st Duke of Montemar
- 1725–1735: Guillaume de Melun, Marquis of Richebourg
- 1735–1737: Ignace-François de Glymes-Brabant, Lord of la Falize
- 1737–1738: Jorge de Verboom, 1st Marquess of Verboom (interim)
- 1738–1742: Ignace-François de Glymes-Brabant, Lord of la Falize
- 1742–1746: Jaime Miguel de Guzmán de Avalos y Spinola

=== Under Ferdinand VI ===
- 1746: Pedro de Vargas y Maldonado
- 1746–1767: Jaime Miguel de Guzmán de Avalos y Spinola

=== Under Charles III ===
- 1767: Bernard O'Conner Phaly (interim)
- 1767–1772: Ambrosio de Funes Villalpando
- 1772–1773: Bernard O'Conner Phaly (interim)
- 1773–1777: Philippe de Cabannes
- 1777–1784: Francisco González y de Bassecourt
- 1784: Felix O'Neille (interim)
- 1784–1789: Francisco González y de Bassecourt

=== Under Charles IV ===
- 1789–1792: Francisco Antonio de Lacy
- 1793–1794: Antonio Ricardos
- 1794: Jerónimo Girón de Moctezuma Ahumada y Salcedo (interim)
- 1794: Luis Firmín de Carvajal, Conde de la Unión
- 1794–1796: José de Urrutia y de las Casas
- 1796: Juan Vicente de Güemes Padilla Horcasitas y Aguayo
- 1797–1799: Agustín de Lancaster y Araciel
- 1799: Antonio Cornell y Ferraz
- 1799–1800: Domingo Izquierdo
- 1800–1801: Pedro Caro y Sureda
- 1801–1802: Francisco de Horcasitas y Colón de Portugal
- 1802–1808: Juan Procopio Bassecourt y Bryas

=== Under Ferdinand VII ===
- 1808: José Manuel de Ezpeleta
- 1808–1809: Galcerán de Vilalba de Meca i de Llorac

=== Under Joseph Bonaparte (Governor general) ===
- 1810: Charles-Pierre Augereau
- 1810: Louis Emmanuel Rey (interim)
- 1810–1811: Étienne Jacques Joseph Macdonald
- 1811–1813: Charles Mathieu Isidore Decaen
- 1813–1814: Louis Gabriel Suchet

=== Spanish counterparts ===
- 1808: Domingo Traggia
- 1808–1809: Juan Miguel de Vives y Feliu
- 1809: Theodor von Reding
- 1809: Antoine de Malet, Marquis de Coupigny (interim)
- 1809: Joaquín Blake y Joyes
- 1809: Francisco Gómez de Terán y Negrete
- 1809: Jaime García-Conde (interim)
- 1810: Enrique José O'Donnell
- 1810: Juan Manuel de Villena
- 1810: Carlos O'Donnell (interim)
- 1810–1811: Miguel Iranzo
- 1811: Luis González-Torres de Navarra y Castro
- 1811–1813: Luis de Lacy
- 1813–1814: Francisco de Oliver-Copons y Méndez-Navia

=== Under Ferdinand VII (restoration) ===
- 1814: Joaquín Ibáñez, Baron de Eroles
- 1814: Francisco Bernaldo de Quirós y Mariño de Lobera
- 1815: Andrés Pérez de Herrasti (interim)
- 1815–1820: Francisco Javier Castaños
- 1820–1822: Pedro Villacampa y Maza de Lizana
- 1822: José María Santocildes
- 1822: Joaquín Ruiz de Porras
- 1822: Francisco Javier Ferraz y Cornell
- 1822–1823: Francisco Javier de Oms y de Santa Pau
- 1823: Fernando Gómez de Butrón (interim)
- 1823: Antonine Rotten (interim)
- 1823: Francisco Espoz y Mina
- 1823–1824: Joaquín Ibáñez, Baron de Eroles
- 1824–1825: Francisco Bernaldo de Quirós y Mariño de Lobera (interim)
- 1825–1826: Juan Caro Sureda
- 1826–1827: Francisco Bernaldo de Quirós y Mariño de Lobera
- 1827–1832: Roger Bernard Charles d'Espagnac de Ramefort
- 1832–1835: Manuel Llauder

=== Under Isabella II ===
- 1835–1836: Francisco Espoz y Mina
- 1836–1836: Juan Aldama e Irábien
- 1837: Francisco Serrano
- 1837–1839: Ramón de Meer y Kindelány
- 1839–1840: Jerónimo Valdés
- 1840–1842: Juan Van Halen
- 1842–1843: Antonio de Seoane (interim)
- 1843: José Cortínez y Espinosa (interim)
- 1843: Miguel Araoz
- 1843: Laureano Sanz y Alfeirán
- 1843–1845: Ramón de Meer y Kindelány
- 1845: Manuel Gutiérrez de la Concha
- 1845: Manuel Bretón del Rio
- 1845–1847: Manuel Pavía y Lacy
- 1847: Manuel Gutiérrez de la Concha
- 1847–1848: Manuel Pavía y Lacy
- 1848: Fernando Fernández de Córdova
- 1848–1849: Manuel Gutiérrez de la Concha
- 1849–1854: Ramón de la Rocha
- 1854–1855: Domingo Dulce, 1st Marquis of Castell-Florite
- 1855–1858: Juan Zapatero y Navas
- 1858–1862: Domingo Dulce, 1st Marquis of Castell-Florite
- 1862–1863: Luis García y Miguel
- 1863–1864: Fernando Cotoner y Chacón
- 1864–1865: Rafael Mayalde y Villaroya
- 1865: Rafaél de Echagüe y Bermingham
- 1865–1866: Fernando Cotoner y Chacón
- 1866–1867: Manuel Gasset y Mercader
- 1867–1868: Juan de la Pezuela y Cevallos
- 1868: Manuel Pavía y Lacy
- 1868: Joaquín Bassols y de Marañosa

=== Provisional Government (1868–1871) ===
- 1868–1869: Ramón de Nouviles y de Rafols
- 1869–1872: Eugenio de Gaminde y Lafont

=== Under Amadeo I ===
- 1872: Manuel de la Serna y Hernández Pinzón
- 1872: Gabriel Baldrich i Palau

=== First Republic ===
- 1872–1873: Eugenio Gaminde y Lafont
- 1873: Juan Contreras y San Román
- 1873: José García Velarde
- 1873: Juan Acosta y Muñoz
- 1873: José Antonio Turón y Prats

=== Provisional Government (1873–1874) ===
- 1873–1874: Arsenio Martínez-Campos y Antón
- 1874: Rafael Izquierdo y Gutiérrez
- 1874: Francisco Serrano y Bedoya
- 1874: José López Domínguez
- 1874: Fernando del Pino y Villamil (interim)

=== Under Alfonso XII ===
- 1874–1876: Arsenio Martínez-Campos y Antón
- 1876–1879: Ramón Blanco y Erenas
- 1879–1880: Luís de Prendergast y Gordon
- 1880–1881: Manuel Pavía
- 1881: Luís de Prendergast y Gordon
- 1881–1883: Ramón Blanco y Erenas
- 1883–1886: José Luis Riquelme y Gómez

=== Under Alfonso XIII ===
- 1886: Joaquín Sánchez del Castillo
- 1886–1890: Ramón Blanco y Erenas
- 1890: Arsenio Martínez-Campos y Antón
- 1890–1893: Ramón Blanco y Erenas
- 1893: Arsenio Martínez-Campos y Antón
- 1893–1896: Valeriano Weyler
- 1896–1899: Eulogio Despujol y Dusay
- 1899–1901: Manuel Delgado y Zuleta
- 1901–1902: Enrique Bargés y Pombo
- 1903–1905: Manuel Delgado y Zuleta
- 1905–1906: Vicente de Martítegui y Pérez de Santamaría
- 1906–1909: Arsenio Linares y Pombo
- 1909: Luis de Santiago y Manescau
- 1909–1914: Valeriano Weyler
- 1914–1915: César del Villar y Villate
- 1915–1917: Felipe Alfau y Mendoza
- 1917: José Marina y Vega
- 1917–1918: José Barraquer y Roviralta
- 1918: Ramón García y Menacho
- 1918–1920: Joaquín Milans del Bosch
- 1920: Valeriano Weyler
- 1920–1921: Carlos Palanca y Cañas
- 1921–1922: José Olaguer Feliú
- 1922–1924: Miguel Primo de Rivera
- 1924–1930: Emilio Barrera Luyando
- 1930: Prince Carlos of Bourbon-Two Sicilies
- 1930–1931: Ignacio Despujol y de Sabater

=== Second Republic ===
- 1931: Eduardo López Ochoa
- 1931–1935: Domènec Batet
- 1935–1936: Francisco Llano de la Encomienda

=== Under Francisco Franco ===
- 1939: Eliseo Álvarez-Arenas Romero
- 1939–1941: Luis Orgaz Yoldi
- 1941–1942: Alfredo Kindelán
- 1943–1945: José Moscardó
- 1945–1949: José Solchaga
- 1949–1957: Juan Bautista Sánchez
- 1957–1962: Pablo Martín Alonso
- 1962–1965: Luis de Lamo y Peris
- 1965–1967: José Luis de Montesino-Espartero y Averly
- 1967–1971: Alfonso Pérez-Viñeta
- 1971–1972: Joaquín Nogueras y Márquez
- 1973–1976: Salvador Bañuls y Navarro

=== Under Juan Carlos I ===
- 1976–1978: Francisco Coloma Gallegos
- 1978–1979: Antonio Ibáñez Freire
- 1979–1980: Luis Otero Saavedra
- 1980–1981: Antonio Pascual Galmes
- 1981–1982: Ricardo Arozarena Girón
- 1982–1983: José Antonio Sáez de Santa María
- 1983–1984: Luis Sáez Larumbe
- 1984–1986: Fernando Rodrígez Ventosa
- 1986–1987: Baldomero Hernández Carreras

==== Región Militar Pirenaica ====
- 1987–1990: José Luis Carrasco Lanzós
- 1991–1993: Ricardo Marzo Mediano
- 1993–1997: Antonio Martínez Teixidó
- 1997–1999: Victor Suanzes Pardo
- 1999–2000: Rafael de Valenzuela Teresa
- 2000–2003: Luis Alejandre Sintes

==== Inspector General of the Army ====
- 2003–2006: Francisco Boyero Delgado
- 2006–2010: Fernando Torres González
- 2010–2013: José Manuel Muñoz Muñoz
- 2013-2017: Ricardo Álvarez-Espejo García
- 2017-2022: Fernando Aznar Ladrón de Guevara
- 2022–: Manuel Busquier Sáez
