= Emtan Karmiel =

Israeli weapons company

Emtan Karmiel Ltd. is an Israeli company that develops and manufactures small arms, pistols and rifles, for militaries and law enforcement agencies in Israel and around the world.

== History ==
Founded in 1977 by Reuven Zada, Emtan Karmiel started operation as a family business producing precision machining parts for the defense industry. In the early 1980s, the company began manufacturing rifle parts and precision parts for the defense industry of Israel.

Since the late 1990s, Emtan Karmiel is an original equipment manufacturer (OEM) that specializes in parts for Israeli made weapons and the A15 model (M4 / M16 sub-models), while operating production lines for rifle kits, as well as rifle and gun parts for European manufacturers.

Emtan Karmiel manufactures in-house rifles, pistols, modern barrels and submachine guns.

== International operations ==
The company provides products for customers including the Philippine National Police, the Philippine Bureau of Jail Management and Penology, the Royal Thai Police, the Democratic Republic of the Congo (DRC), manufacturers of firearms in Switzerland, Germany, the United Kingdom and customers in America, Africa and South America and for the commercial markets in Europe, South and Central America.

== Products ==
=== Military and law enforcement ===
- MZ-4 automatic rifle that comply with the MIL-SPEC (M4/M16 equivalent)
- MZ-4 P automatic rifle MZ-4 with Piston operation system (M4/M16 with improved operation and design)
- MZ-4 P FRB MZ-4 with piston operation system and folding retractable buttstock
- MZ-47 automatic rifle for use with AK47 magazines and ammunition 7.62x39 (M4/M16 platform with AK47 compatibility)
- MZ-300 automatic rifle 300 Blackout 7.62x35 (M4/M16 platform with 300 blackout barrel for special forces)
- MZ-9 automatic sub-machinegun (M4/M16 compact platform with 9MM NATO capabilities)
- Spare parts and conversion from old "long" M16 to new "short" flat-top M4 (ideal for governments that want to modify existing rifle stock instead of going for a new purchase and tender)
- Ramon 9mm striker polymer pistol
- MZ-10S sniper rifle

=== Commercial and civilian ===
- MZ-15 semi-automatic rifle MIL-SPEC (AR15 equivalent)
- MZ-15 P semi-automatic rifle MZ-15 with piston operation system (AR15 with improved operation and design)
- MZ-15 P FRB MZ-15 with piston operation system and folding retractable buttstock.
- MZ-47 S semi-automatic rifle for use with AK47 magazines and ammunition7.62x39 (AR15 platform with AK47 compatibility)
- MZ-300 S semi-automatic rifle 300 blackout 7.62x35 (AR15 platform with 300 blackout barrel)
- MZ-9 S semi-automatic sub-machinegun/pistol (AR15 compact platform with 9MM NATO capabilities).
- Ramon 9mm striker polymer pistol
- MZ-10S sniper rifle
