= Grupo de Acción Rápida =

Tactical unit of the Spanish Civil Guard

Rapid Action Group
- Grupo de Acción Rápida (Spanish)
- Active: 1982–present
- Country: Spain
- Agency: Guardia Civil
- Type: Police tactical unit
- Operations jurisdiction: National
- Part of: Jefatura de Unidades Especiales y de Reserva
- Headquarters: Logroño
- Abbreviation: GAR

Structure
- Agents: Approx. 500
- Companies: Four

Commanders
- Current commander: Lieutenant Colonel Jesús Gayoso Rey

Grupo de Acción Rápida (GAR) (English: Rapid Action Group) is the tier two police tactical unit of the Spanish Civil Guard (Spanish: Guardia Civil) that specializes in quick response to emergencies with SWAT unit tactics.

== Mission ==
The unit's missions primarily involve anti-irregular military, apprehension of armed and dangerous criminals, counterterrorism and hostage rescue crisis management, executive protection, high-risk tactical law enforcement situations, operating in difficult to access terrain, protecting high-level meeting areas, providing security in areas at risk of attack or terrorism, special reconnaissance in difficult to access and dangerous areas, support crowd control and riot control, and tactical special operations.

== History ==
Tracing its origins to the Unidad Antiterrorista Rural (UAR) formed in April 1978. The Grupo Antiterrorista Rural was formed in 1982 and later renamed to Grupo de Acción Rápida. It is based in Logroño.

Initially aimed to counter Euskadi Ta Askatasuna (ETA), since 1998 it has re-oriented towards international deployments, taking part in European Union (EU), NATO, and United Nations (UN) missions in Afghanistan, Bosnia, Central African Republic, Haiti, Kosovo, and the Lebanon.

== Training ==
Applicants to GAR have to complete over five months of training with between 25% and 30% completing the course.

== Equipment ==
Firearms used include the Heckler & Koch USP Compact 9×19mm, Heckler & Koch MP5 9×19mm and the Heckler & Koch HK417 7.62×51mm respectively.

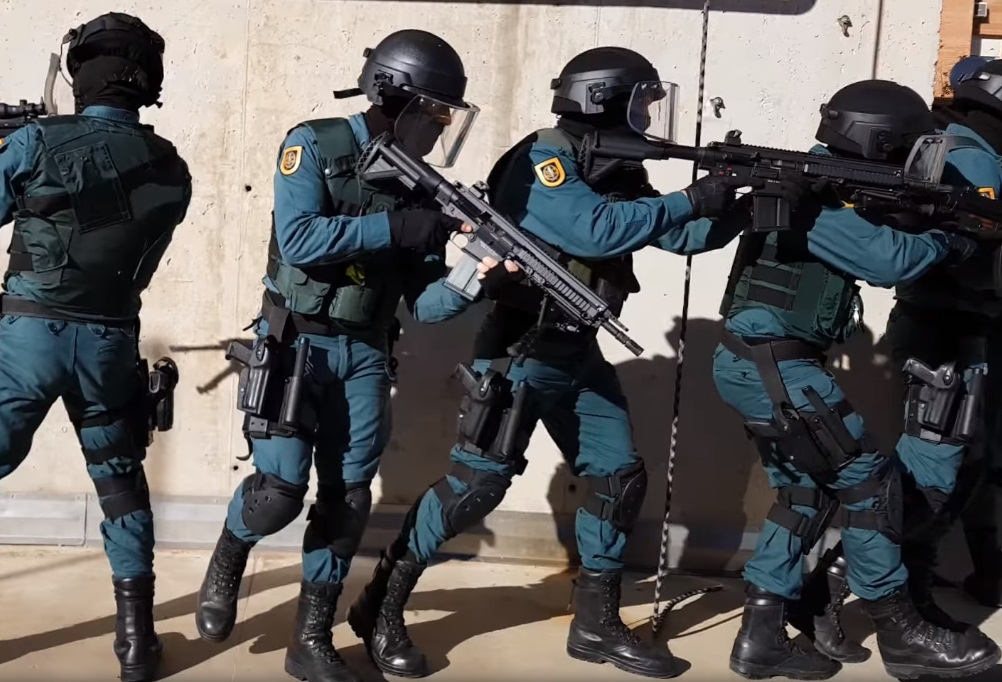
Members of the unit during the staging of a mannequin challenge video.
