= Civil Guard (Spain) =

Gendarmerie of Spain

Civil Guard Guardia Civil
- Emblem of the Civil Guard
- Abbreviation: GC
- Motto: El honor es mi divisa Honour is my badge

Agency overview
- Formed: 13 May 1844
- Employees: 92,549 total (2025) and, of that, 82,387 in active service (2025)
- Annual budget: €3.67 billion, 2026

Jurisdictional structure
- Operations jurisdiction: Spain
- General nature: Gendarmerie

Operational structure
- Overseen by: Directorate-General of the Police
- Headquarters: Calle de Guzmán el Bueno, 110, 28003 Madrid, Spain
- Elected officers responsible: Fernando Grande-Marlaska, Minister of the Interior; Margarita Robles, Minister of Defence
- Agency executives: Mercedes González Fernández, Director-General; Manuel Llamas Fernández, Deputy Director of Operations
- Parent agency: Directorate-General of the Civil Guard

Notables
- Award: Laureate Cross of Saint Ferdinand

Website
- www.guardiacivil.es

The Civil Guard (Spanish: Guardia Civil [ˈɡwaɾðja θiˈβil]) is one of the two national law enforcement agencies of Spain, the other being the National Police Corps. As a national gendarmerie, it is military in nature and is responsible for civil policing under the authority of both the Ministry of the Interior and the Ministry of Defence. The role of the Ministry of Defence is limited except in times of war, when the Ministry has exclusive authority. The corps is colloquially known as the benemérita (the meritorious or the reputables). In annual surveys, it generally ranks as the national institution most valued by Spaniards, closely followed by other law enforcement agencies and the armed forces.

It has both a regular national role and undertakes specific foreign peacekeeping missions and is part of the European Gendarmerie Force. As a national gendarmerie force, the Civil Guard was modelled on the French National Gendarmerie and has many similarities.

As part of its daily duties, the Civil Guard patrols and investigates crimes in rural areas, including highways and ports, whilst the National Police deals with safety in urban situations. Most cities also have a Municipal Police Force. The three forces are nationally co-ordinated by the Ministry of the Interior. The Civil Guard is usually stationed at casas cuartel, which are both minor residential garrisons and fully-equipped police stations.

== History ==
=== Origin ===
The Guardia Civil was founded as a national police force in 1844 during the reign of Queen Isabel II of Spain by the 2nd Duke of Ahumada and 5th Marquess of Amarillas, an 11th generation descendant of Aztec emperor Moctezuma II. Previously, law enforcement had been the responsibility of the "Holy Brotherhood", an organization of municipal leagues. Corruption was pervasive in the Brotherhood, where officials were constantly subject to local political influence, and the system was largely ineffective outside the major towns and cities. Criminals could often escape justice by simply moving from one district to another. The first Guardia police academy was established in the town of Valdemoro, south of Madrid, in 1855. Graduates were given the Guardia's now famous tricorne or Cavaliers hat as part of their duty dress uniform.

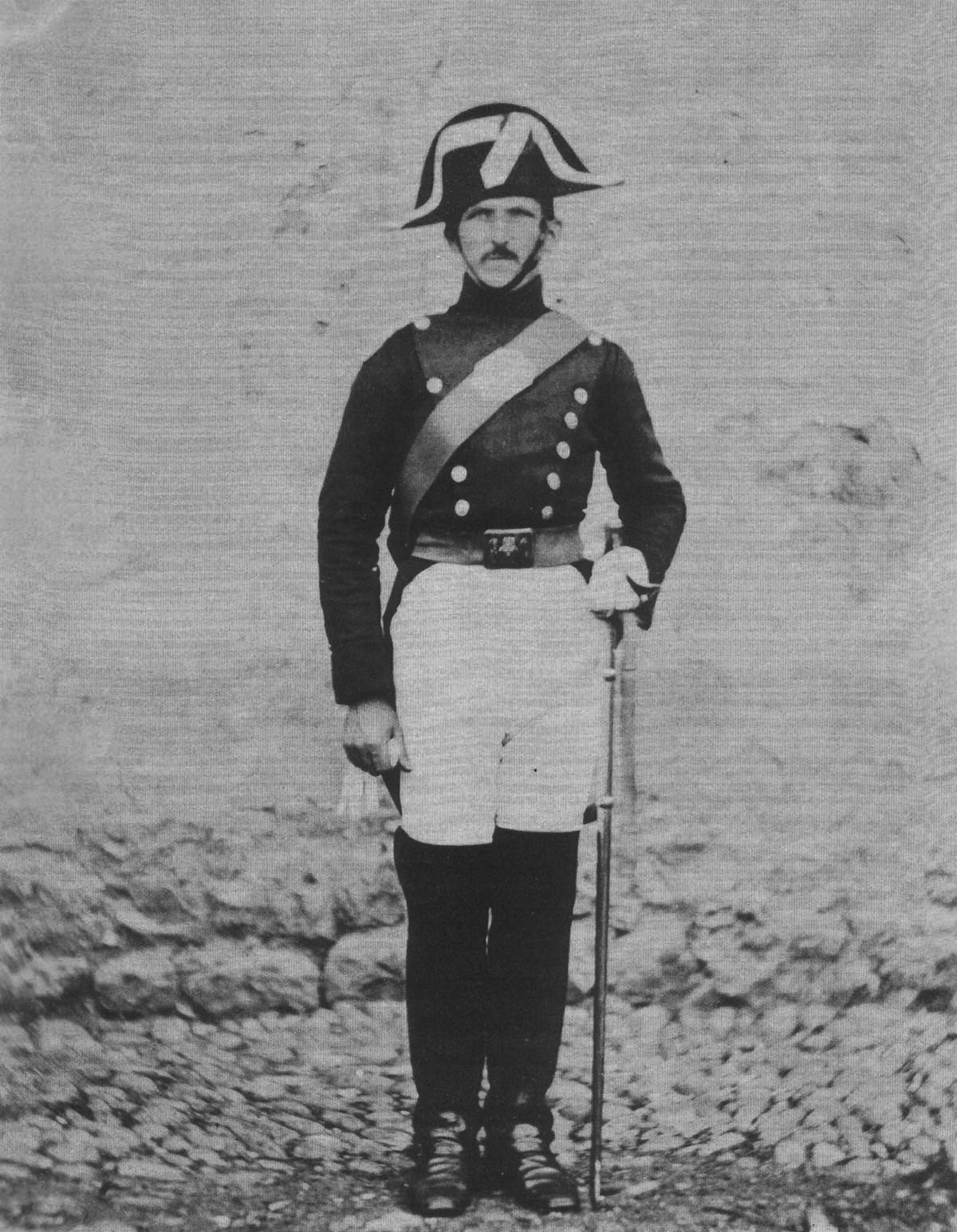
First ever photograph taken of a Guardia Civil, somewhere between 1855 and 1857 in Reinosa, Spain.

The Guardia was initially charged with putting an end to brigandage on the nation's highways, particularly in Andalusia, which had become notorious for numerous robberies and holdups of businessmen, peddlers, travelers, and even foreign tourists. Banditry in this region was so endemic that the Guardia found it difficult to eradicate it completely. As late as 1884, one traveler of the day reported that it still existed in and around the city of Málaga:

The favorite and original method of the Malagueño highwayman is to creep up quietly behind his victim, muffle his head and arms in a cloak, and then relieve him of his valuables. Should he resist, he is instantly disembowelled with the dexterous thrust of a knife...[The Spanish highwayman] wears a profusion of amulets and charms...all of undoubted efficacy against the dagger of an adversary or the rifle of a Civil Guard.

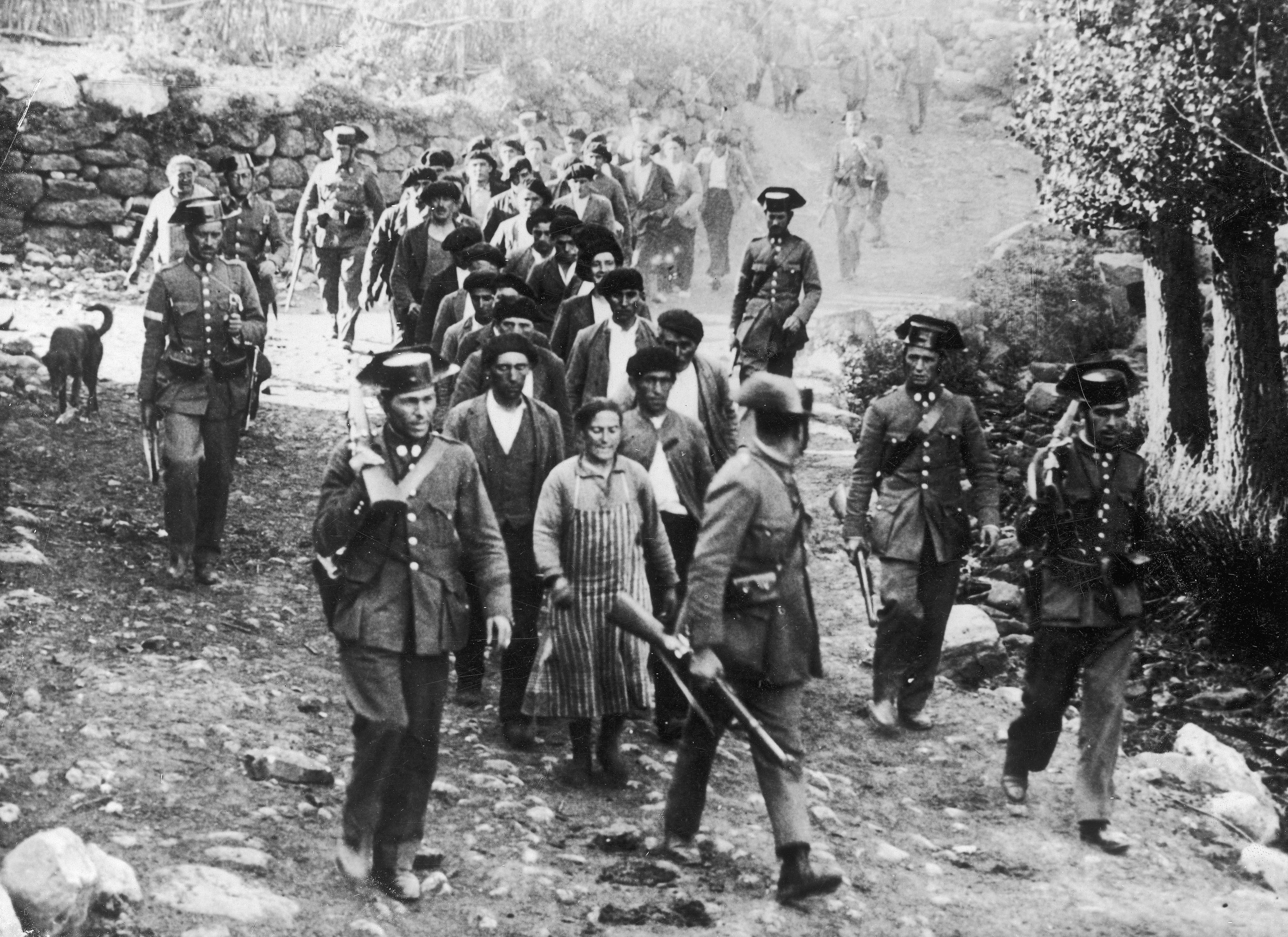
Column of Guardias Civiles during the 1934 Asturian Revolution, Brañosera

The Guardia Civil was also given the political task of restoring and maintaining land ownership and servitude among the peasantry of Spain by the King, who desired to stop the spread of anti-monarchist movements inspired by the French Revolution. The end of the First Carlist War combined with the unequal distribution of land that resulted from prime minister Juan Álvarez Mendizábal's first Desamortización (1836–1837) had left the Spanish landscape scarred by the destruction of civil war and social unrest, and the government was forced to take drastic action to suppress spontaneous revolts by a restive peasantry. Based on the model of light infantry used by Napoleon in his European campaigns, the Guardia Civil was transformed into a military force of high mobility that could be deployed irrespective of inhospitable conditions, able to patrol and pacify large areas of the countryside. Its members, called 'guardias', maintain to this day a basic patrol unit formed by two agents, usually called a "pareja" (a pair), in which one of the 'guardias' will initiate the intervention while the second 'guardia' serves as a backup to the first.

Under the pre-1931 monarchy, relations between Gitanos and the Civil Guard were particularly tense.

=== Spanish Civil War (1936–1939) ===
Republican Civil Guard emblem (1931–1939)

During the Spanish Civil War, the Guardia Civil forces split almost evenly between those who remained loyal to the Republic, 53% of the members (which changed their name to Guardia Nacional Republicana – "Republican National Guard") and the rebel forces. However, the highest authority of the corps, Inspector General Sebastián Pozas, remained loyal to the republican government. Their contribution to the Republican war efforts were invaluable, but proved effective on both sides in urban combat.

The proportion of Guardia Civil members that supported the rebel faction at the time of the 1936 coup was relatively high compared to other Spanish police corps such as the Guardias de Asalto and the Carabineros (Real Cuerpo de Carabineros de Costas y Fronteras), where when the Civil War began over 70% of their members stayed loyal to the Spanish Republic.

Loyalist General of the Guardia Civil José Aranguren, commander of the 4th Organic Division and Military Governor of Valencia, was arrested by the victorious Francoist troops when they entered the city of Valencia at the end of March 1939. After being court-martialed, Aranguren was given the death penalty and was executed on 22 April in the same year.

=== Colonial service ===
Locally recruited units of the Guardia Civil were employed in Spain's overseas territories. These included three tercia (regiments) in the Philippines and two companies in Puerto Rico prior to 1898. Over six thousand Civil Guards, both indigenous and Spanish, were serving in Cuba in 1885 and smaller units were subsequently raised in Ifni and Spanish Guinea.

=== Francoist era (1939–1975) and attempted coup d'état (1981) ===
Following the Civil War, under the dictatorship of General Francisco Franco (1939–1975), the Guardia Civil was reinforced with the members of the Carabineros, the "Royal Corps of Coast and Frontier Carabiniers", following the disbandment of the carabinier corps.

Critics of the Guardia Civil have alleged numerous instances of police brutality because of the organisation's association with Franco's regime. The fact that the Guardia largely operated in mostly rural and isolated parts of the country increased the risk of police violations of individual civil rights through lack of supervision and accountability. Federico García Lorca's poems have contributed to the Guardia Civil's reputation as a heavy-handed police force at the time.

The involvement of Guardia Civil figures in politics continued until the end of the twentieth century: on 23 February 1981, Lt. Col. Antonio Tejero Molina, a member of the Guardia Civil, participated with other military forces in the failed 23-F coup d'état. Along with 200 members of the Guardia Civil, he briefly took hold of the lower house of the Cortes before the coup collapsed following a nationally televised address denouncing the coup by King Juan Carlos.

== Modern force ==
The Guardia Civil as a police force has had additional responsibilities in addition to its traditional role. Certain duties are not delegated to the Civil Guard (as well as to the National Police) in some Autonomous Communities, as some have their own autonomous police forces. Forces such as the Mossos d'Esquadra and the Ertzaintza carry out duties such as highway patrol or law enforcement in rural areas, down to the Civil Guard elsewhere.

The Spanish Civil Guard patrol ship Rio Segura moored in Dakar, Senegal, during the counternarcotics and proliferation exercise Saharan Express on March 8, 2014.

It is the largest police force in Spain, in terms of area served. Today, their policing and safety duties include:

- law enforcement in all Spanish territory, excluding cities with more than 20,000 inhabitants,
- highway patrol,
- protection of the King of Spain and other members of the Spanish Royal Family,
- military police as part of military deployments overseas
- anti-narcotics operations,
- anti-smuggling operations,
- customs and ports of entry control,
- airport security,
- safety of prisons and safeguarding of prisoners,
- weapons licenses and arms control,
- security of border areas,
- bomb squad and explosives (TEDAX),
- high risk and special operations unit (UEI),
- coast guard,
- police deployments abroad (embassies),
- intelligence, counterterrorism and counter-espionage (SIGC),
- diving unit (GEAS),
- cyber and internet crime,
- mountain search and rescue (GREIM),
- hunting permits and environmental law enforcement (SEPRONA).

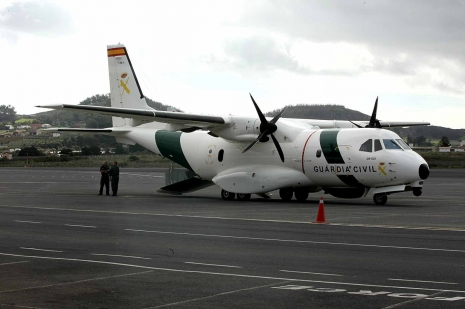
Guardia Civil's CASA CN235 surveillance aircraft

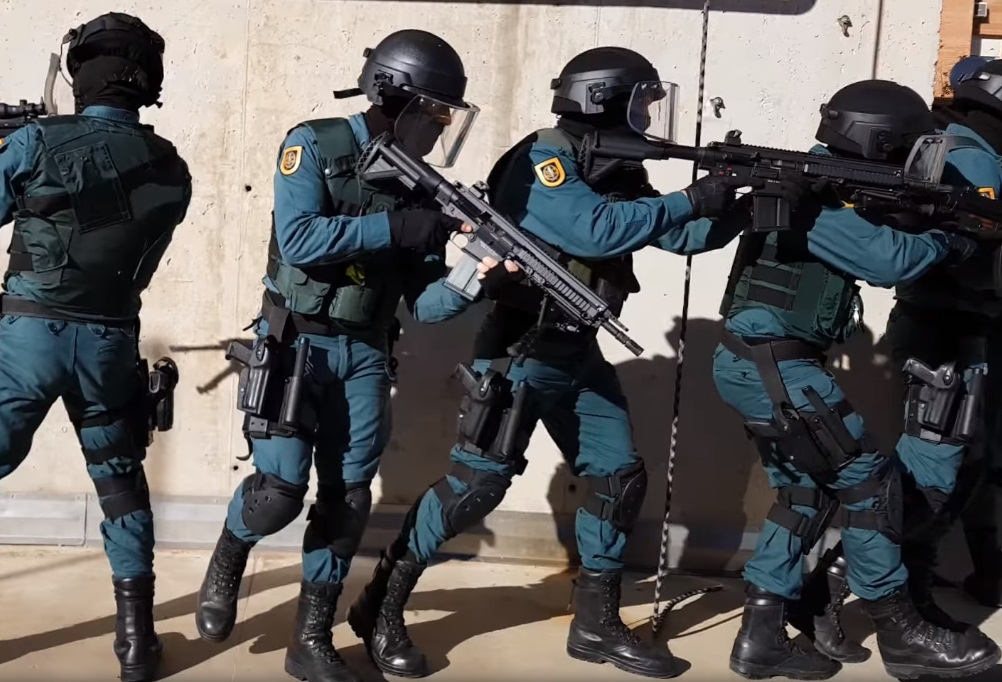
Quick reaction force, Grupo de Acción Rápida, of the Civil Guard.

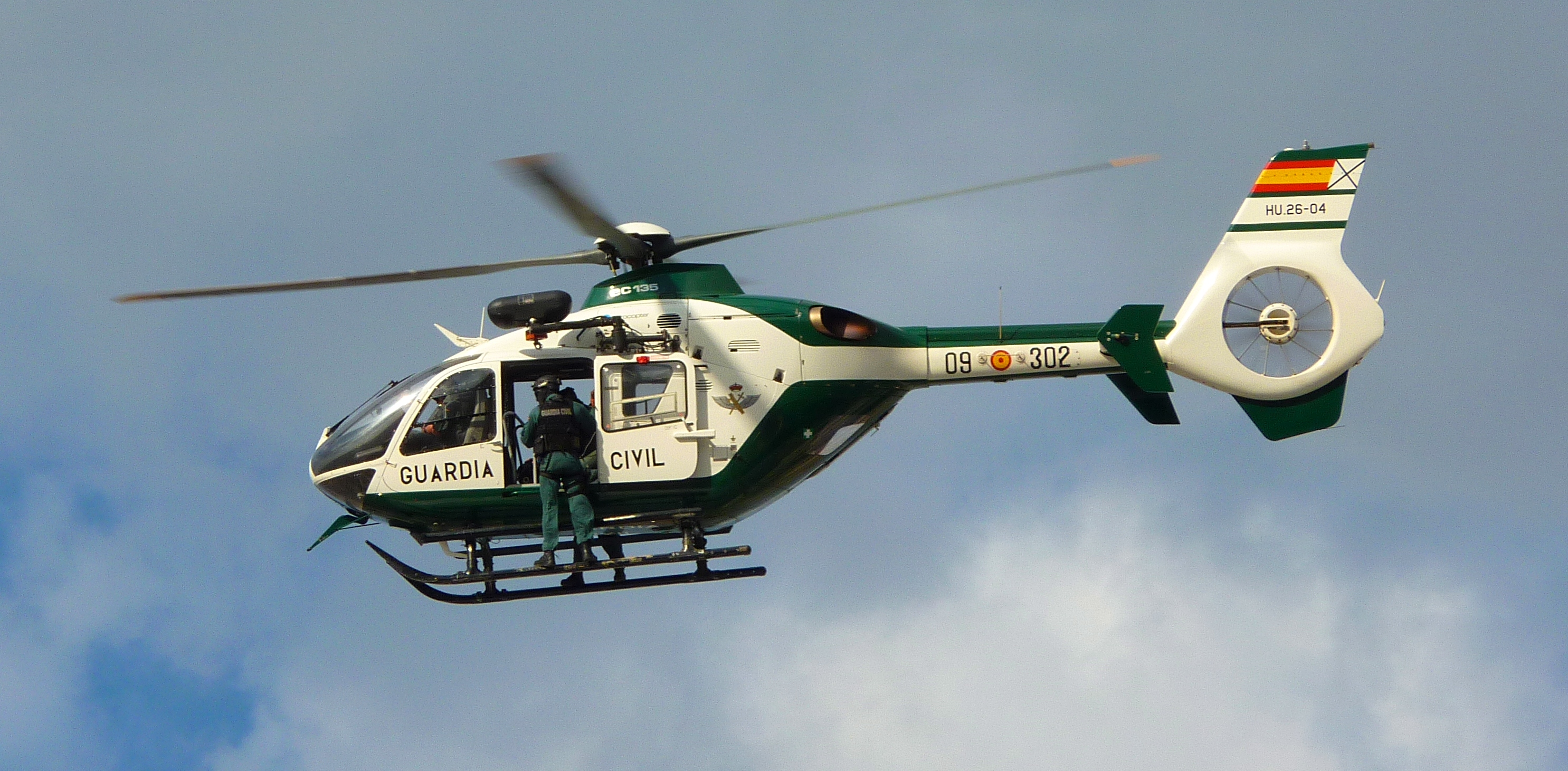
Spanish Civil Guard Eurocopter EC-135P-2 carrying members of the Unidad Especial de Intervención (Special Intervention Unit).

== Peacekeeping and other operations ==
The Guardia Civil has been involved in operations as peacekeepers in United Nations sponsored operations, including operations in Bosnia and Herzegovina, Angola, Congo, Mozambique, Nicaragua, Haiti, East Timor and El Salvador. They also served with the Spanish armed forces contingent in the war in Iraq, mainly as military police but also in intelligence gathering, where seven of its members were killed.

In the Afghan war the rapid reaction branch of the Guardia Civil—Grupo de Acción Rápida (GAR)—was deployed to the Kabul area in 2002 shortly after the invasion, and served as the protective team for the High Representative of the European Union. They served in this capacity until 2008. In that period, the Agrupación de Tráfico (Traffic Group), Jefatura Fiscal y de Fronteras (Customs and Revenue Service), Policía Judicial (Judicial Police), and Seguridad Ciudadana (Public Order and Prevention service) also deployed to Afghanistan to aid with peacekeeping.

After 2009, the mission of the Civil Guards in Afghanistan shifted focus to training up local security forces in the country. During that period, the counter-terrorism branch of the Guardia Civil—Unidad de Acción Rural (UAR)—deployed to Afghanistan to train the Afghan National Police as part of ISAF's Police Advisor Team (PAT) formerly the Police Operative Mentoring and Liaison Team (POMLT).

In addition to el instituto armado ("the armed institution"), the Guardia Civil is known as la benemérita ("the commendable", "the meritorious"). They served in the Spanish colonies, including Cuba, Puerto Rico, the Philippines, Spanish Guinea and Spanish Morocco.

The Guardia Civil has a sister force in Costa Rica also called the Guardia Civil. The Costa Rican "guardias" often train at the same academy as regular Spanish officers.

During the Iraqi Civil War, the GAR deployed to Iraq to train and assist Iraqi federal police in the fight against ISIS militants.

== Characteristics ==
- Members of the Guardia typically patrol in pairs.
- Members of the Guardia Civil often live in barracks (casa-cuartel) with their families.
- The Guardia Civil must accommodate the families of its "guardias", and became the first police force in Europe that accommodated a same-sex partner in a military installation.
- The symbol of the Guardia Civil consists of the Royal Crown of Spain, a sword and a fasces. The different units have variations of this symbol.
- The sidearm of the Guardia Civil from the 1970s to the early 1990s was the Star Model BM pistol chambered in 9mm until its replacement by the Beretta 92; the Beretta was later replaced by the H&K USP.

=== Traditions ===
Monogram

Ship racing stripe

==== Hymn ====
The Guardia's first song was composed between 1915 and 1916 by Asunción García Sierra (who wrote the lyrics) and Ildefonso Moreno Carrilllo (who composed the music) as a school hymn. In the 1920s, Lieutenant Colonel José Osuna Pineda was assigned to the center as Head of Studies and arranged the original text and melody. This marching song was that of the College of Young Guardsmen, adopted as the school's alma mater march since December 1922. Despite the absence of any legal provision, the song became official upon its use.

==== Motto ====
The motto of the Civil Guard is "El Honor es mi Divisa" ("Honor is my badge"). It comes from article 1 of the "Cartilla del Guardia Civil", written by the Duke of Ahumada in 1845. The full text says: "Honor is the main badge of the Civil Guard; it must, therefore, be kept spotless. Once lost, it is never recovered".

==== Music Unit ====
The Music Unit of the Civil Guard (Spanish: Unidad de Música de la Guardia Civil) is the military band of the Civil Guard and is one of several in the Armed Forces. It is officially part of the guard's General Directorate. Since its creation in 1844, it has had musical infantry and cavalry formations through various ranks. The Civil Guard, the Royal Guard, and many Army cavalry and artillery units retained mounted bands with cavalry trumpeters at the time, while the infantry of both the Army and Civil Guard had bugle bands then (formerly corps of drums composed of drummers and fifers). On 19 November 1859 a unified band appeared for the first time. Other bands were formed throughout the years in both Madrid and Valdemoro. In 1940, the first squads of Civil Guard musicians were officially approved and applications to join the official Civil Guard band were released in October 1941. In 1949, as a consequence of the merging of the Carabineros Corps and the Civil Guard, their music bands were unified. These templates remained that way for over two decades when they were increased to adapt them to those of army music, forming two bands: one with 75 musicians attached to the General Directorate of the Corps and with 50 instrumentalists belonging to the Jefatura de Enseñanza. The resolutions of 28 June 2004 and 14 February 2006 unified the two music units, becoming the current band, which reports to the General Subdirectorate of Personnel and is administratively attached to the General Affairs Service.

A small mounted band is in service with the Security Group's Civil Guard Cavalry Squadron, with its barracks and stables in Valdemoro, administratively under the supervision of the Young Guardsmen's College. Unlike other mounted bands, they only use small fanfare trumpets (clarines de caballeria and trompetas bajas). They continue the traditions of the Civil Guard cavalry since its foundation. In 2022 the Mounted Band of the Civil Guard Cavalry Squadron finally received its own kettledrummer, bringing it in line with the Royal Guard's Mounted Band of the Royal Escort Squadron.

==== Tricorn ====
The Civil Guard is characterised by its tricorn hat, officially called the "black hat" by the Civil Guard, the official headgear in full and service dress uniforms. Other pieces of headgear such as peaked caps, berets or garrison caps are also used. Throughout its history, other headwear of various types, colors and shapes have been used, including the Teresiana kepi.

==== Patronage ====
On 8 February 1913, Our Lady of the Pillar was declared by royal decree as the guard's exalted patron saint.

== Uniforms ==
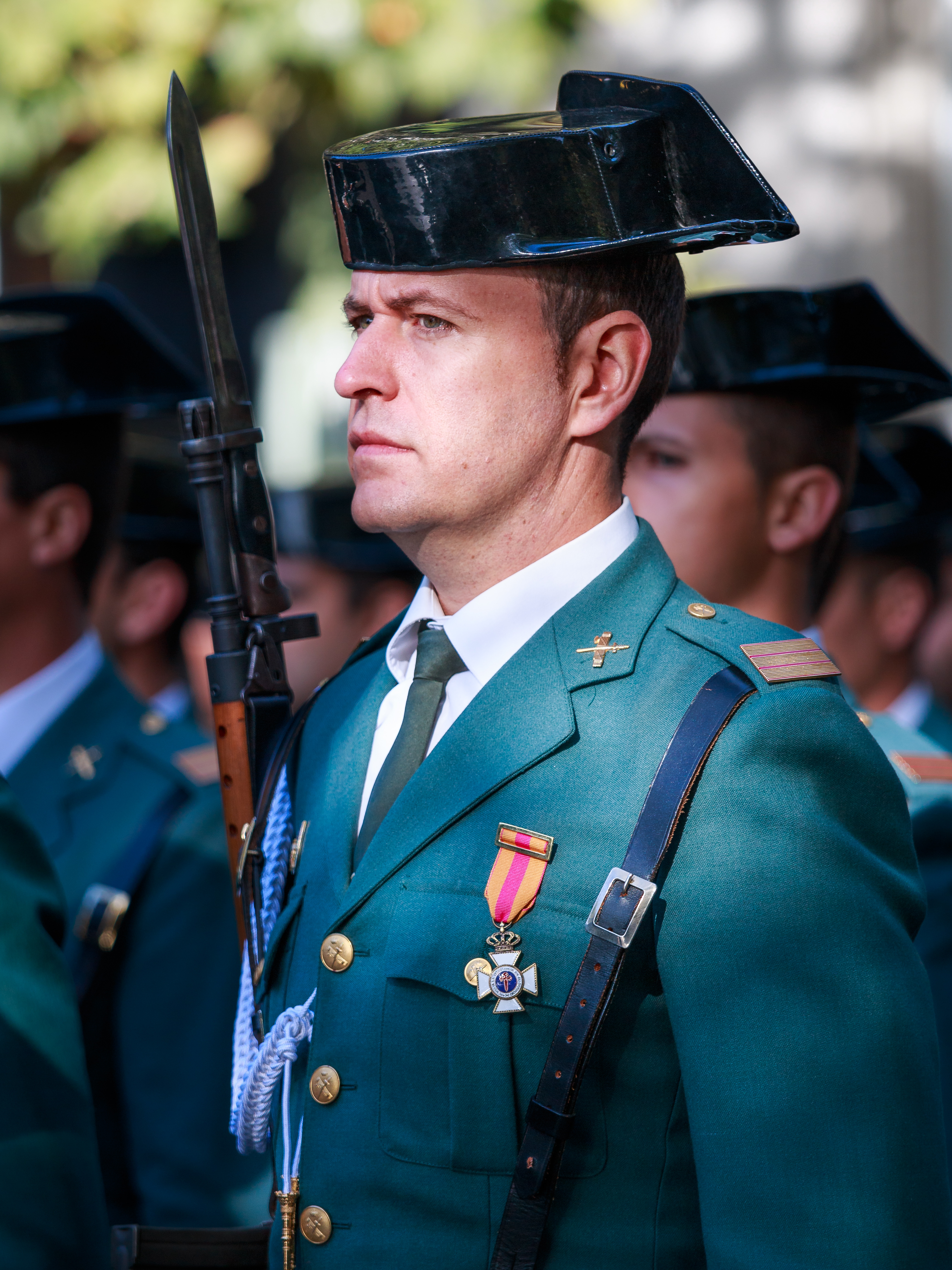
Spanish Guardia Civil wearing the tricornio hat during National Day celebrations in Madrid.

A wide range of clothing is currently worn according to the duties being performed (see schematic diagrams below).

The traditional headdress of the Guardia is the tricornio hat, originally a tricorne. Its use now is reserved for ceremonial parades and duty outside public buildings, together with the army-style tunic and trousers previously worn. For other occasions a cap or a beret is worn.

The historic blue, white and red uniform of the Guardia is now retained only for the Civil Guard Company of the Royal Guard and the gastadores (parade markers) of the Civil Guard Academy.

A modernised new style of working uniform was announced for the Civil Guard in 2011, for general adoption during 2012. This comprises a green baseball cap, polo shirt and cargo pants. The kepi-like "gorra teresiana" was abolished.

Uniforms of the Civil Guard
Patrol	Patrol Road waistcoat	Traffic Group Motorcyclist ATGC	Sailor Coverralls	Sailor Summer	USECIC	GAR	GRS Winter

GREIM Rescue	GEAS Diver	Camouflage Military Police	Service Dress Winter	Service Dress Summer	Full Dress	Evening Dress	Ceremonial Dress Historic

Uniforms of the Civil Guard 1989–2012
Patrol Winter	Patrol Summer	Patrol Road waistcoat	Traffic Group

== Ranks and insignia ==
NATO code	OF-10	OF-9	OF-8	OF-7	OF-6	OF-5	OF-4	OF-3	OF-2	OF-1
(Spain) Spanish Civil Guard
(Spain) Spanish Civil Guard			Teniente general	General de división	General de brigada	Coronel	Teniente coronel	Comandante	Capitán	Teniente	Alférez

NATO code	OR-9		OR-8	OR-7	OR-6	OR-5	OR-4	OR-3	OR-2	OR-1
(Spain) Spanish Civil Guard
(Spain) Spanish Civil Guard	Suboficial mayor	Subteniente	Brigada	Sargento primero	Sargento	Cabo mayor	Cabo primero	Cabo	Guardia Civil de Primera (Note: Rank in abeyance)	Guardia Civil

== Organization and specialities ==
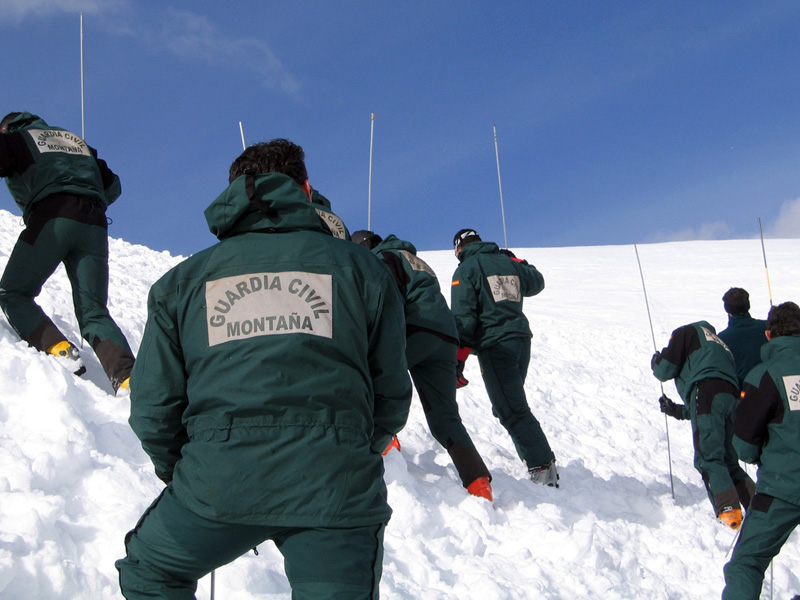
A mountain rescue group (GREIM) from the Civil Guard in an avalanche rescue training exercise.

1939–1977 Civil Guard emblem

The Corps has been organised into different specialties divided into operational and support specialties:

- UAR (Unidad de Acción Rural) – The rural tactical service branch of the Guardia Civil
- Seguridad Ciudadana – Public Order and Prevention Service, which makes up the bulk of the Guardia Civil
- GEAS (Grupo Especial de Actividades Subacuáticas) – Divers
- GRS (Grupo de Reserva y Seguridad) – Security Group, involved in riot control and includes personnel of the Civil Guard Cavalry Squadron
- SEMAR (Servicio Marítimo) – Guardia Civil Naval Service, tasked with seashore surveillance and fisheries inspections
- SEPRONA (Servicio de Protección de la Naturaleza) – Nature Protection Service, for environmental protection
- SAER (Servicio Aéreo) – Guardia Civil Air Service
- Servicio Cinológico – K-9 Unit, for drug and explosives detection and people tracking
- GREIM (Grupos de Rescate e Intervención en Montaña / Servicio de Montaña) – Mountain and Speleology Rescue
- Jefatura Fiscal y de Fronteras – Customs and Revenue Service
- SIGC (Servicio de Informacion de la Guardia Civil) – Intelligence Service
- TEDAX (Técnicos Especialistas en Desactivación de Artefactos Explosivos) – lit, Explosive Artifacts Defuser Specialised Technicians (EOD)
- Agrupación de Tráfico – Traffic Group, The Guardia Civil Highway Patrol unit, tasked with the control of highways and trunk roads
- GAR (Grupo de Acción Rápida) – Rapid Reaction Group. Special antiterrorist unit, operating within all of Spain and participating in some foreign missions
- UCO (Unidad Central Operativa) – Central Operative Unit, a branch of the Policía Judicial focused on complex or nationwide investigations
- UEI (Unidad Especial de Intervención) – Special Intervention Unit
- ODAIFI (Oficinas de Análisis e Investigación Fiscal) – investigation for prosecution of criminal offenses, notably detection of contraband (notably money, drugs, stolen objects and CITES) at points of entry to Spain.
- USESIC (Las Unidades de Seguridad Ciudadana de la Comandancia, citizen security units of command centres) Elite forces attached to some regional headquarters

== Personnel requirements ==
- Spanish citizenship
- Fluent Spanish language
- Cadets at sixteen and adult service between eighteen and thirty-one years old.
- Completed compulsory secondary education (ESO)
- No record of chronic illness, and general good health.
- Ability to swim

== Equipment ==
=== Firearms ===
Weapon	Origin	Type
EMTAN Ramon	Israel	Standard issue
Heckler & Koch USP Compact	Germany	Standard issue
Beretta 92	Italy	Being phased out for H&K USP Compact and EMTAN Ramon
Heckler & Koch MP5	Germany	Standard issue submachine gun
EMTAN MZ-4P	Israel	In 5.56×45mm version
Heckler & Koch G36	Germany	In use
Heckler & Koch HK33	Germany	In use
SIG Sauer MCX Rattler	USA	15 units chambered in 300 AAC Blackout purchased in 2023
CETME rifle	Spain	
SIG SG 553	Switzerland	

=== Aircraft ===
- CASA CN 235
- INDRA P2006T

=== Helicopters ===
- MBB BÖ-105
- MBB/Kawasaki BK-117
- Airbus H-135
- Airbus H-365 Dauphin II

== Training of other forces ==
The Guardia Civil has some training and supervision responsibilities for essentially private security services with similar names:

- Guardas Rurales (country estates and nature reserves)
- Guardas de Caza (hunting grounds and game reserves)
- Guardapescas Marítimos (fish farms and shellfish reserves)

The Guàrdia Urbana de Barcelona is not part of the Guardia Civil.

== See also ==
- Emblems of the Spanish Civil Guard
- Fuerzas Auxiliares
- Civil Guard (disambiguation)
- Order of Merit of the Civil Guard
- Guardia de Asalto
- Policía Armada
- Policía Nacional
- Republican National Guard (Portugal)
- Civil Guard (Philippines)
- "Spanish Bombs" by The Clash, references the Spanish Civil War.
- Operation Anubis

== Bibliography ==
- Silva, Lorenzo (2018) [2017]. Sereno en el peligro: la aventura histórica de la Guardia Civil. Madrid: Edaf. ISBN 978-84-414-3808-8.
