= Spanish Intelligence Community =

- Coat of Arms of Spain

Agency overview
- Formed: May 6, 2002
- Jurisdiction: Madrid, Spain
- Agency executives: Pedro Sánchez, Prime Minister; Carlos Cuerpo, Deputy Prime Minister

The Spanish Intelligence Community (Spanish: Comunidad de Inteligencia Española) is a group of intelligence organizations dependent on the Government of Spain that established themselves as an intelligence community through Law 11/2002. The intelligence community can be divided into three blocks:

- Foreign intelligence: Formed by the National Intelligence Center along with its minor agencies.
- Domestic intelligence: Formed mainly by the Intelligence Center for Counter-Terrorism and Organized Crime and other minor agencies.
- Military intelligence: Formed by the Armed Forces Intelligence Center and the agencies of each branch of the Armed Forces.

To all these agencies, must to be added the intelligence agencies from the different police corps of Spain. The Intelligence Community responds directly to the Prime Minister and the Council of Ministers.

== Members ==
| Agency | Parent Agency | Government Department | Date est. |
|---|---|---|---|
| Department of National Security | None | Prime Minister's Office | 2012 |
| National Intelligence Centre | None | Ministry of Defence | 2002 |
| National Cryptologic Center | National Intelligence Centre | Ministry of Defence | 2004 |
| National Security Office | National Intelligence Centre | Ministry of Defence | 1983 |
| Intelligence Center for Counter-Terrorism and Organized Crime | Secretariat of State for Security | Ministry of the Interior | 2014 |
| General Commissariat of Judiciary Police | National Police Corps | Ministry of the Interior | 1958 |
| General Commissariat of Information | National Police Corps | Ministry of the Interior | 1912 |
| Civil Guard Information Service | Civil Guard | Ministry of the Interior | 1941 |
| Central Operative Unit | Civil Guard | Ministry of the Interior | 1987 |
| Armed Forces Intelligence Center | Office of the Chief of the Defence Staff | Ministry of Defence | 2005 |
| Joint Cyber-Defence Command | Office of the Chief of the Defence Staff | Ministry of Defence | 2013 |
| Intelligence and Security Section | Office of the Chief of Staff of the Army | Ministry of Defence | |
| Signals Intelligence and Electronic Warfare Section | Office of the Chief of Staff of the Army | Ministry of Defence | |
| Central Naval Security Section | Office of the Chief of Staff of the Navy | Ministry of Defence | |
| Intelligence and Security Section | Office of the Chief of Staff of the Air and Space Force | Ministry of Defence | |
| Counterintelligence and Information Section | Office of the Chief of Staff of the Air and Space Force | Ministry of Defence | |
| Aerospace Intelligence and Targeting Center | Office of the Chief of Staff of the Air and Space Force | Ministry of Defence | |
| Customs Surveillance Service | Spanish Tax Agency | Ministry of Finance | 1944 |
| Information Division | Mossos d'Esquadra | Government of Catalonia | 1983 |
| Information and Analysis Unit | Ertzaintza | Basque Government | 1982 |
| Information Division | Policía Foral | Government of Navarre | 2004 |

== Supervision ==
According to Law 11/2002, of May 6, the intelligence community is supervised by the three powers of the State.

In the case of the government, article 6 of the law establishes the Government Delegated Committee for Intelligence Affairs, chaired by the Deputy Prime Minister, whose purpose is "to ensure the proper coordination of all State information and intelligence services for the formation of an intelligence community".

It has three main responsabilities:

- To propose to the Prime Minister the annual objectives of the National Intelligence Centre, which must be incorporated into the Intelligence Directive.
- To monitor and evaluate the progress made toward achieving the objectives of the National Intelligence Centre.
- To ensure the coordination of the National Intelligence Centre, the intelligence services of the State Security Forces and Corps, and the civil and military administrative bodies.

With regard to parliament, article 11 of the law obliges the Congress of Deputies to have a committee, chaired by the President of the Congress of Deputies, to supervise its "expenses, functioning and activities".

Finally, the judiciary oversees and, where appropriate, authorizes some clandestine activities. According to Organic Law 2/2002, of May 6, regulating the prior judicial control of the National Intelligence Centre, the Plenary of the General Council of the Judiciary must designate a Supreme Court justice responsible for the CNI affairs—and a substitute justice—, who will be responsible for authorizing those activities of the intelligence services that involve the violation of fundamental rights such as the inviolability of the home and the secrecy of communications.

== Emblems ==
Most of Spanish Intelligence Agencies emblems and logos have its reproduction prohibited.

Emblems of members of the IC
Emblem of the Armed Forces Intelligence Center

Emblem of the Civil Guard's Central Operative Unit

Emblem of the CITCO

Emblem of the MCCE

Emblem of the General Commissariat of Information

Emblem of the General Commissariat of Judiciary Police

Emblem of the Customs Surveillance Service

== See also ==
- Australian Intelligence Community
- Israeli Intelligence Community
- Pakistani intelligence community
- Russian Intelligence Community
- United States Intelligence Community
