= Central Operative Unit =

Spanish Civil Guard Unit

- Unidad Central Operativa (Spanish)
- Emblem of the UCO
- Active: Since 8 September 1987; 38 years ago
- Country: Spain
- Agency: Civil Guard
- Abbreviation: UCO

Structure
- Agents: More than 700

The Central Operative Unit (Spanish: Unidad Central Operativa, UCO) is a specialized division of the Civil Guard of Spain responsible for the investigation and prosecution of the most serious forms of crime and organized crime, whether national or international, as well as support to the Territorial Units of Judicial Police, that, due to lack of personnel or resources, or because the criminal field is more than one autonomous communities, require the support of this Unit.

== Functions ==
The main crimes that the UCO investigates are:

- Economic crimes, including frauds, counterfeit money and smuggling.
- Drugs trafficking.
- Money laundering.
- Homicides and kidnappings.
- Crimes against the national heritage sites.
- Telematics crimes.
- Crimes against the environment, including trafficking of endangered species.
- Medicaments trafficking.
- Smuggling of valuable objects.
- Arms trafficking, explosives smuggling and hazardous goods trafficking.
- Human trafficking.
- Vehicles smuggling.

Also, the UCO has the duty to realize investigations ordered by a judge, a court or a prosecutor.

== Structure ==
- Commander of the Unit (a Civil Guard Colonel).
  - Department of Technical and Operational Support.
  - Department of Criminal Investigation specialized in General Delinquency.
  - Department of Criminal Investigation specialized in Economic and Technological Delinquency.
  - Department of Criminal Investigation specialized in Drug Trafficking and Smuggling.
  - Unit attached to the Anti-Drug Special Attorney's Office.
  - Unit attached to the Anti-Corruption Special Attorney's Office.
  - Teams Against Organized Crime (ECO), six teams through the country.

== Important cases ==
- February 27, 1994. Release of Maria Àngels Feliu after 492 days kidnapped.
- July 23, 2007. Arrest of Jaime Giménez Arbe (known as "The Loner") in Figueira da Foz, Portugal.
- October 27, 2009. The dismantling of a corruption plot in the metropolitan area of Barcelona, in the so-called "Pretoria Case", in which the mayor of Santa Coloma de Gramenet and other former public officials were arrested.
- October 27, 2014. The dismantling of a corruption plot called "Púnica Case".
- July 18, 2017. The dismantling of a corruption plot in the Royal Spanish Football Federation.

== See also ==
- General Commissariat of Judiciary Police
- Spanish Intelligence Community
- National Police Corps
