= Intelligence Center for Counter-Terrorism and Organized Crime =

Spanish domestic intelligence agency

- Centro de Inteligencia contra el Terrorismo y el Crimen Organizado
- Emblem of the CITCO

Intelligence agency overview
- Formed: October 15, 2014; 11 years ago
- Preceding agencies: National Anti-Terrorism Coordination Center; Intelligence Center against Organized Crime
- Headquarters: Madrid, Spain
- Ministers responsible: Aina Calvo, Secretary of State
- Intelligence agency executive: Francisco Javier Marín Lizárraga, Director
- Parent department: Secretariat of State for Security

The Intelligence Center for Counter-Terrorism and Organized Crime (Spanish: Centro de Inteligencia contra el Terrorismo y el Crimen Organizado, CITCO) is the Spanish domestic intelligence agency responsible for the prevention of terrorism and organized crime by managing and analyzing all intelligence. It was formed in October 2014 by merging of the National Anti-Terrorism Coordination Center and Intelligence Center against Organized Crime.

== History ==
The agency was created on October 15, 2014 by the Royal Decree 873/2014, of 10 October 2014, which modified the Royal Decree 400/2012, of 17 February 2014, by which the basic structure of the Ministry of the Interior was developed. The agency resulted from the merged of two predecessor domestic intelligence agencies, the National Anti-Terrorism Coordination Center (CNCA) and the Intelligence Center against Organized Crime (CICO) under the Secretariat of State for Security within the Ministry of the Interior. The purpose of the union was to optimize efforts and take advantage of economic resources of both agencies in the face of growing threats and the link between violent extremist, terrorist organizations and organized crime.

== Functions ==
CITCO is responsible for the reception, integration and analysis of the strategic information available in the fight against organized crime, terrorism and violent radicalism, the design of specific strategies against these threats, and, where appropriate, the establishment of criteria for Action and operational coordination of the bodies acting in the cases of coincidence or concurrence in the investigations, and in particular:

- To receive, integrate and analyze information and operational analysis related to organized or especially serious crime, terrorism and violent radicalism that are relevant or necessary for the elaboration of strategic and prospective criminal intelligence in relation to these phenomena, both in its national and international projection, integrating and channeling to the State Security Forces and Corps all the operational information that it receives or captures.
- To dictate, determine and establish, in the cases of joint or concurrent intervention, the coordination and action criteria of the operative units of the State Security Forces and Corps, and of those with other intervening agencies, according to their competencies support the intervention.
- To prepare annual reports on the situation of organized crime, terrorism and violent radicalism in Spain, as well as a periodic assessment of the threat in these fields.
- To develop and disseminate statistical information related to these matters and in particular to drug trafficking.
- To propose national strategies against organized crime, terrorism and violent radicalism and update them on a permanent basis, coordinating and verifying their development and implementation.
- To establish, within the scope of their powers, the corresponding relationships with other centers or similar units of the European Union, their Member States or third countries

== Personnel ==
The personnel of the agency are composed from the National Police Corps (CNP), Civil Guard, Customs Surveillance Service, Prison officers, Armed Forces and Centro Nacional de Inteligencia (CNI).

=== Directors ===
1. National Police Chief Commissioner José Luis Olivera Serrano, acting director (2014 – 2015) and director (2015 – 2018).
2. Civil Guard Colonel Francisco Montes López, acting director in July 2018.
3. Civil Guard Brigadier general Ángel Alonso Miranda, director from (July 2018 – September 2020).
4. Civil Guard Brigadier general Manuel Navarrete Paniagua (September 2020 – December 2024).
5. Civil Guard Brigadier general Francisco Javier Marín Lizárraga, director since December 2024.

== See also ==
- Terrorism in Spain
- Spanish Armed Forces Intelligence Center
- General Commissariat of Information
- Civil Guard Information Service
