= Directorate-General of the Civil Guard =

- Dirección General de la Guardia Civil
- Civil Guard emblem

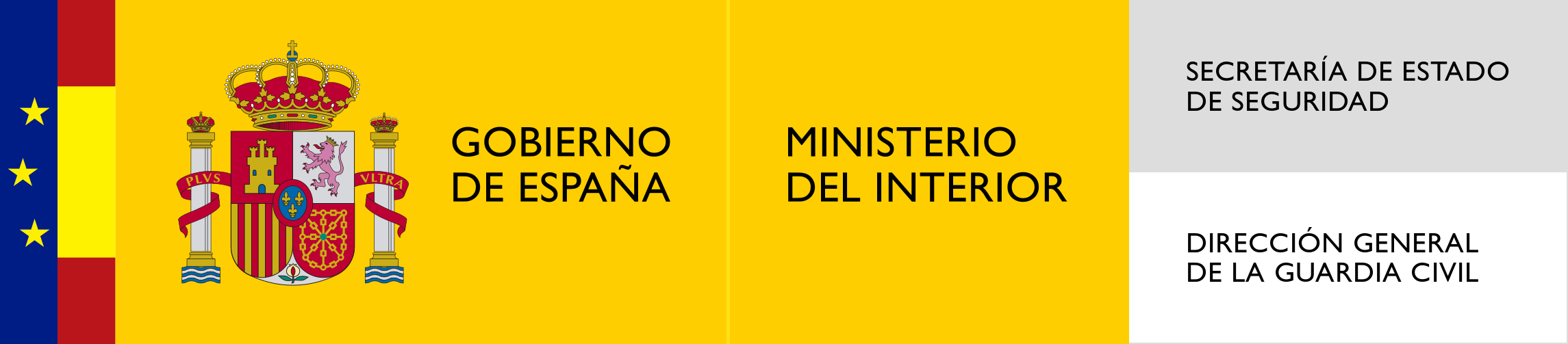

Agency overview
- Formed: September 1, 1844; 181 years ago
- Type: Directorate-General
- Jurisdiction: Government of Spain
- Headquarters: 110 Guzman el Bueno Street Madrid
- Annual budget: € 3.67 billion, 2023
- Agency executives: Mercedes González Fernández, Director-General; Manuel Llamas Fernández, Deputy Director of Operations
- Parent department: Secretariat of State for Security
- Child agency: Civil Guard
- Website: www.guardiacivil.es

The Directorate-General of the Civil Guard (DGGC) is a component of the Spanish Department of the Interior responsible for exercising the direct command of the Civil Guard law enforcement agency. The DGGC, integrated in the Secretariat of State for Security, is in charge of organize, direct, coordinate and execute the missions entrusted to the Civil Guard by the provisions in force, in accordance with the guidelines and orders issued by the Ministers of the Interior and of Defense, within the scope of their respective powers.

The DGGC was created in 1844 as an Inspectorate-General and it was renamed as Directorate-General in 1859. Briefly, during 1932 to 1939 it was known again as Inspectorate-General. Since its inception, it has been integrated in the Ministry of the Interior and it has been dependent also from the Ministry of Defence, in all the maters related to the military nature of the agency.

The Directorate-General of the Civil Guard is headed by the Director-General, an official appointed by the Prime Minister at the joint request of the Defence and Interior Ministers. To assist the Director-General there is a deputy director of Operations (DAO), a Civil Guard officer with the rank of Lieutenant general. The current director-general of the Civil Guard is Mercedes González Fernández and the DAO is Ltn. General Manuel Llamas Fernández.

== History ==
=== Historic context ===
The need to create a rural agency that gave security to the fields and roads of Spain was evident in the first half of the 19th century. The confiscation processes of the mentioned century, the fractionation of rural property, the dissolution of the National Militia and the political vicissitudes and continuous changes of government were some of the causes that led to the birth of the Civil Guard by Royal Decree of March 28, 1844.

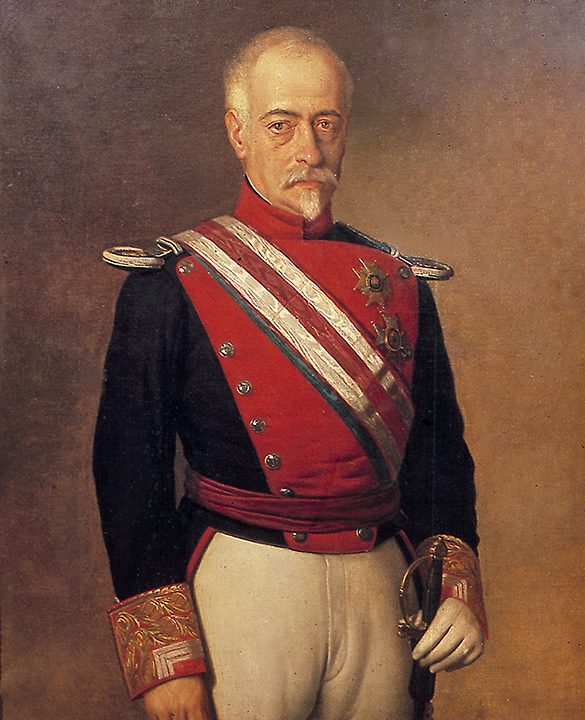
The Duke of Ahumada, first director-general.

Francisco Javier Girón, 2nd Duke of Ahumada was appointed to organize the agency. He made a report explaining how the agency and the remuneration system to the agents should be regulated, a report that considerably reduced the budget, and that caused the approval of a new Royal Decree on May 13 that repealed that of April —which did not come into force— and that is the true date of creation of the agency.

=== Inspectorate-General ===
The aforementioned decree of May 13, 1844 created an Inspectorate-General as the central administrative organ in all the matters relating the agency's organization, personnel, discipline and material, and related to both the Ministry of War and the Ministry of the Interior. The creation of the Inspectorate became effective with the appointment of its first holder, Francisco Javier Girón, who was rewarded for his work in creating the agency with that position on September 1, 1844.

Another decree of October 15 gave the inspector-general as functions those of "direction and inspection of the agency, and from its authority all branches of the service (...) depend, as well as the internal regime, administration and discipline. He will direct his organization dedicating himself with special and exquisite care to establish and perfect the privileged and interesting service to which said agency is dedicated, proposing to the Royal approval the improvements or variations that time and experience prove necessary to its perfection. And finally, he will watch over the strict observance of these regulations, as well as that of his special service and other subsequent resolutions that will be communicated to him". The royal decree also established that, in order to fulfill its functions, the inspector had to be dependent of the Ministry of the Interior and of War.

=== Veteran Civil Guard ===
On December 29, 1857, a Royal Decree stipulates that the Urban Guard of Madrid would depend on the Inspector-General of the Civil Guard and on March 24, 1858, another new Decree provided that the Urban Guard would depend on the Ministry of the War in terms of organization, personnel, armament and discipline and that of the Interior in relation to services, payment of salaries, quartering and material. For this reason, on April 6, 1859, it changes its name to Veteran Civil Guard (Guardia Civil Veterana) and the Inspection-General was renamed as the Directorate-General for the Civil and Veteran Guard.

With this agency practically integrated into the Civil Guard, on October 12, 1864, the organ was renamed as the Directorate-General of the Civil Guard.

=== Second Republic and Francisco Franco's Dictatorship ===
After a failed coup d'état on August 10, 1932, the government of the Second Republic reformed the law enforcement agencies and, as a result, by decree of August 16, 1932, the DGGC is abolished and the Inspection-General is recovered, with full and unique dependence from the Interior Department. The Inspectorate was structured in September of that year, being integrated by the inspector-general, the military secretariat and three offices.

After the Civil War and the rebellious victory, the great part of the Carabineros remained loyal to the republic, and although a large part of the Civil Guard also, the first was punished with its dissolution and integration in the second mainly by the great prestige that, already at the time, had this last. This was done through the Law of 15 March 1940, which also integrated the Civil Guard into the Armed Forces, although it maintained the Interior Ministry and Civil Governors (provincial leaders) dependence, in all matters relating to services, barracks, wages and material. This law also recovered the Directorate-General.

=== Democratic era ===
The Spanish transition to democracy was a time of great changes in the field of public safety, although they do not affected excessively the Directorate-General. In 1994 a new phenomenon occurs, such as the integration of two important departments, that of Justice and that of the Interior. Through this integration a super-ministry was created with powers in judicial and security affairs. The DGGC is renamed as General Secretariat-Directorate-General of the Civil Guard (since 1986 it had the rank of general secretariat) until 1996, when both departments separated.

==== Single control and current split ====
Between September 2006 and December 2011, the Directorates-General of the Police and of the Civil Guard were merged by Prime Minister Zapatero with the purpose of «carry out the tasks of both police forces in a more integral, homogeneous and coordinated way». In 2008, it was known that the Interior Minister, Alfredo Pérez Rubalcaba, was not comfortable with this union of command and wanted to split them again, but that was not the opinion of the Prime Minister and remained together. In 2009 it was created the University Center of the Civil Guard, integrated in the directorate-general. During this time both agencies maintained their differentiated structure and legal regime, with a different Coordination Office for each body. In addition, the positions of deputy directors of Operations (Director Adjunto Operativo, DAO) were created as a technical assistance organ to the director-general. There was one DAO for each law enforcement agency.

With the arrival of Prime Minister Rajoy to the government and the appointment of Juan Ignacio Zoido as Interior Minister, they decided to split the command again considering that the coordination task was a duty of the Secretary of State for Security and that every agency needed to have their own command. In July 2017, Minister Zoido abolished the positions of deputy directors of Operations, a decision that was reversed by Minister Fernando Grande-Marlaska in July of the following year.

== Organizational structure ==
The Directorate-General, led by the Director-General, is integrated by:

- Coat of arms of the Office of the Deputy Director of Operations of the Civil Guard.
  The Office of the Deputy Director of Operations, it is the immediately subordinate and main assistant organ to the Director-General in the exercise of its functions. It is in charge of planning, promoting and coordinating the services of the Civil Guard Units, in accordance with the guidelines issued by the director-general; it assumes, in general, all the tasks and activities that are expressly assigned to it by the Director-General, and it directs, promotes and coordinates the actions that the Civil Guard develops in the field of cybersecurity. As such, it is responsible for:
  - The Operations Command.
    - The Civil Guard General Staff.
    - The Special and Reserve Units Headquarters.
      - The Reserve and Security Group.
      - The Rural Action Unit.
      - The Civil Guard Air Service.
      - The Cinological and Trace Service.
      - The Service of Deactivation of Explosives and Nuclear, Radiological, Biological and Chemical Defense.
      - The Mountain Service.
      - The Protection and Security Service.
      - The Royal Household Security Unit.
      - The Prime Minister's Office Security Unit.
    - The Traffic Group Headquarters.
    - The Nature Protection Service Headquarters.
    - The Weapons, Explosives and Security Headquarters.
    - The Civil Guard Districts and the Ceuta and Melilla Commands.
  - The Border and Maritime Police Command.
    - The Fiscal and Border Headquarters.
    - The Maritime Police Headquarters.
  - The Information Headquarters.
  - The Judicial Police Headquarters.
    - The Central Operative Unit.
    - The Technical Unit of Judicial Police.
    - The Criminalistics Service.
  - The International Cooperation Headquarters.
  - The Digital Transformation and Cybersecurity Headquarters.
- Coat of arms of the Guardia Civil's Personnel Command.
  The Personnel Command.
  - The Personnel Headquarters.
    - The Human Resources Service.
    - The Remuneration Service.
    - The Disciplinary Regime Service.
  - The Teaching Headquarters.
    - The Selection and Training Service.
    - The Improvement Service.
    - The High Studies and Doctrine Service.
  - The Personnel Assistance Headquarters.
    - The Social Action Service.
    - The Healthcare Service.
    - The Psychology Service.
    - The Prevention Service.
    - The General Affairs Service.
    - The Historical Studies Service.
  - The Permanent Secretariat for Evaluation and Classification.
  - The Technical Secretariat.
- Coat of arms of the Guardia Civil's Support Command.
  The Support Command.
  - The Economic Affairs Headquarters.
    - The Hiring Service.
    - The Economic Management Service.
  - The Support Services Headquarters.
    - The Barracking Service.
    - The Mobile Material Service.
    - The Armament and Police Equipment Service.
    - The Supply Service.
  - The Technical Services Headquarters.
    - The Computing Service.
    - The Telecommunications Service.
    - The Service for Technological Innovation and Information Security.
    - The Statistics Service.
  - The Technical Secretariat.
- The Technical Cabinet, with functions of support to the director-general and to facilitate the coordination of the organs and Units that depend on him. Likewise, it is responsible for preparing the necessary studies and reports, processing the regulatory provisions within the scope of its competence, and how many other missions are entrusted by the head of the Directorate-General.

== Budget ==
The Directorate-General of the Civil Guard has a budget of € 3,672,034,140 for 2023. It is divided as follows:

Budget of the Directorate-General for 2023
Program No.	Program	Amount	Ref.
131N	Training of State Security Forces and Corps	€93,571,920	
131O	Forces and Corps in reserve	€211,295,470	
132A	Citizen security	€3,336,852,280	
132C	Police operations in drug matters	€30,314,470	
DGGC's total budget		€3,672,034,140	
