= Francisco Javier Velázquez =

Spanish civil servant (born 1951)

Francisco Javier Velázquez López (born 3 June 1951) is a Spanish civil servant who was from 18 April 2008 until 3 January 2012 Director General of the Police and Civil Guard. He was born in Castilblanco de los Arroyos, Andalusia, Spain and taught at the Charles III University of Madrid.

== See also ==
- National Police Corps
- Civil Guard

Government offices
Preceded by Joan Mesquida Ferrando	Director-General of the Police and Civil Guard; 2008–2012	Succeeded by Arsenio Fernández de Mesa; Director-General of the Civil Guard; Ignacio Cosidó; Director-General of the Police
