= Directorate-General of the Police =

- Dirección General de la Policía
- National Police Corps emblem

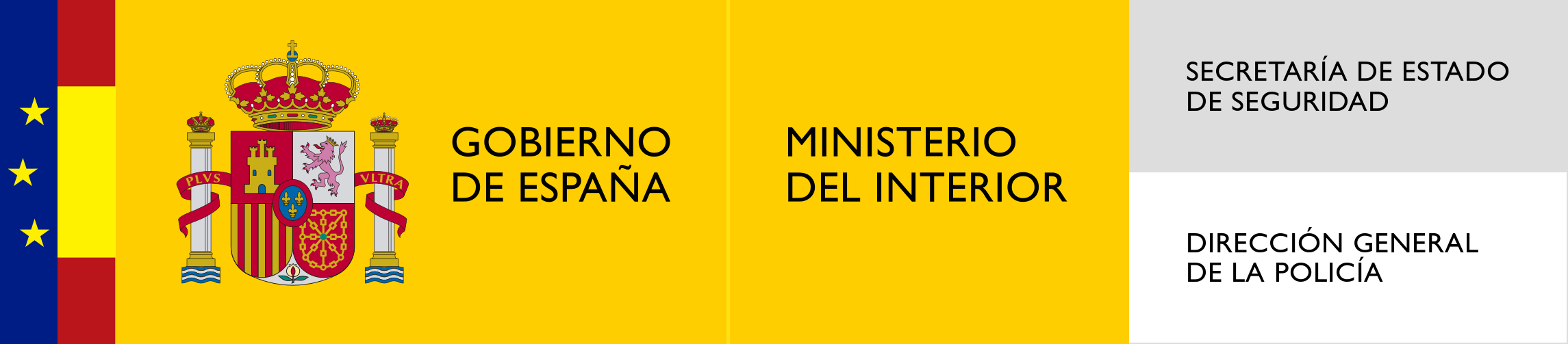

Agency overview
- Formed: May 10, 1979; 47 years ago
- Preceding agency: Directorate-General for Security
- Type: Directorate-General
- Jurisdiction: Government of Spain
- Headquarters: 5 Miguel Ángel Street Madrid
- Annual budget: € 3.96 billion, 2023
- Agency executives: Francisco Pardo, Director-General; José Luis Santafé Arnedo, Deputy Director of Operations
- Parent department: Secretariat of State for Security
- Child agency: National Police Corps
- Website: www.policia.es

The Directorate-General of the Police (DGP) is a component of the Spanish Department of the Interior responsible for exercising the direct command of the National Police Corps, the main civil law enforcement agency of Spain. The DGP, integrated in the Secretariat of State for Security, is in charge of organize, direct, coordinate and execute the missions entrusted to the National Police by the provisions in force, in accordance with the guidelines and orders issued by the Minister of the Interior.

The DGP was created in 1979 to replace the Directorate-General for Security in the command of the two civil police forces that existed at that time, the Corps of National Police and the Superior Police Corps. In 1986 both Corps were unified in the National Police Corps. Also, between 2006 and 2011 this directorate was unified with that of the Civil Guard.

The Directorate-General of the Police is headed by the Director-General, an official appointed by the Monarch at the request of the Interior Minister. To assist the Director-General there is a Deputy Director of Operations (DAO), a National Police Commissioner. The current director-general of the Police is the former SEDEF Francisco Pardo and the DAO is Chief Commissioner José Luis Santafé Arnedo.

== History ==
=== 1978 Police Act ===
Three weeks before the publication of the Constitution, the Police Act of December 4, 1978 was published. This law was a new stage for public safety in Spain. It structured the State security agencies through the Police and the Civil Guard. At the same time, the Police consisted of two agencies; the Superior Police Corps, successor to the General Police Corps and distantly from the Surveillance Corps (1852), and by the National Police Corps, direct successor to the Armed and Traffic Police Corps, and indirectly to the Security Corps (1852) and the Assault Guard (1932).

Also, this law meant the suppression of various public order organs, highlighting the Directorate-General for Security, a public order body created in the 1910s that during the dictatorship of Francisco Franco was the visible face of repression. Likewise, for the first time the functions of both police forces are clearly distributed, attributing to the police the "security in the provincial capitals and other large towns", and the rest of the territory and, in particular, the rural areas, they were responsibility of the Civil Guard as well as traffic and legislation on weapons and explosives.

=== Directorate-General of the Police ===
The Police Act created the Directorate-General of the Police to assume the functions of the Directorate-General for Security, under the orders of the new Directorate for State Security (DGS), a direct predecessor of the current Secretariat of State for Security. The last head of the DGS was Mariano Nicolás García.

Thus, becoming effective the mandate of said law, the DGP was fully operational in 1979, being its first holder José Sainz González. The DGP inherited the organizational structure of the DGS, being integrated by the director-general, the deputy director-general, the Personnel, Economic Management, and Teaching and Improvement Divisions, the General Commissariats of Information, of Judicial Police and of Documentation, as well as of the Inspectorate-General of the Police and the entire peripheral police structure.

=== Organic Act on Security Forces and Corps ===
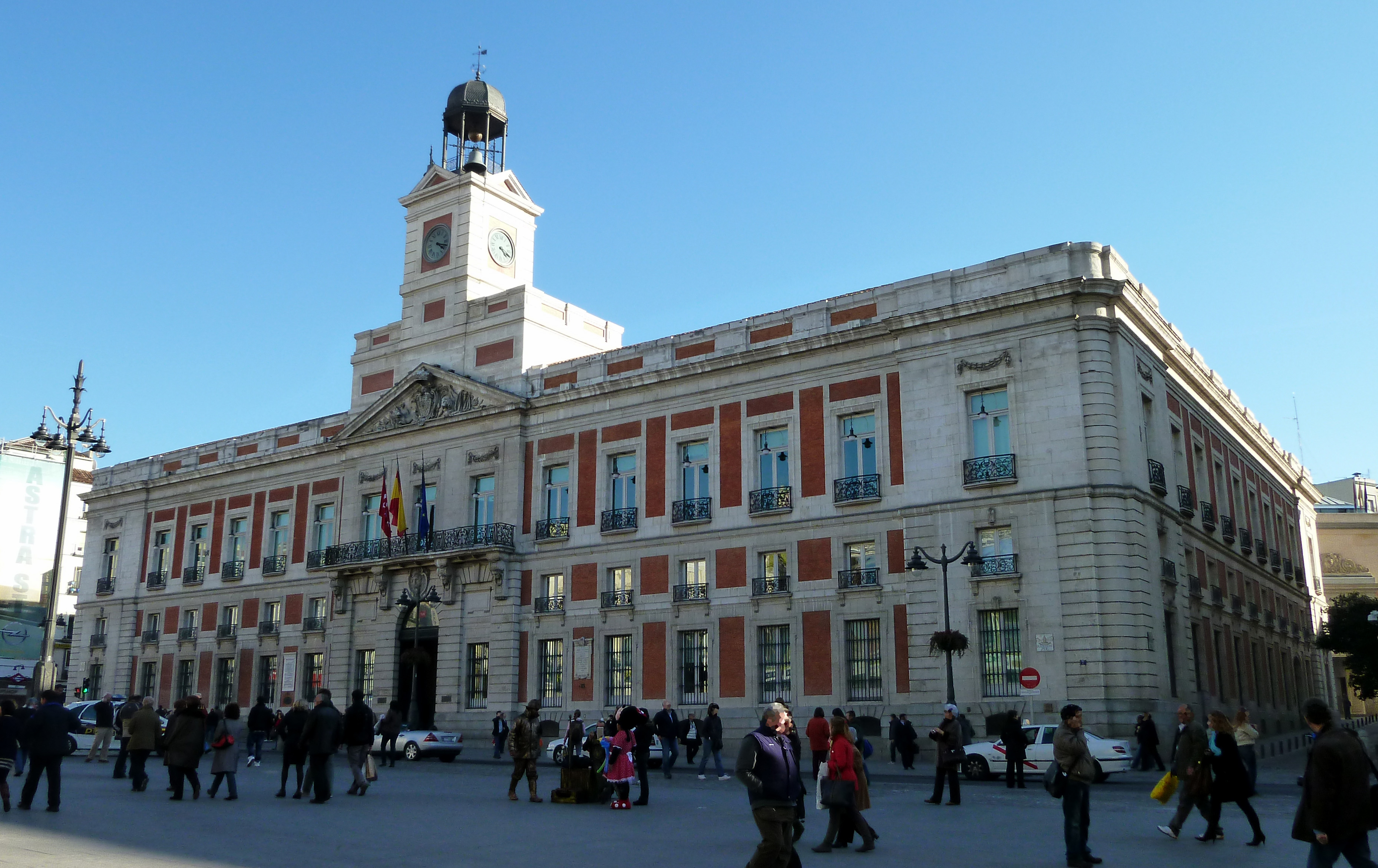
The Royal House of the Post Office, former headquarters of the organ and current seat of the Regional Government of Madrid.

The most relevant change to which the DGP has had to adapt has been to the approval of the Organic Act of Security Forces and Corps of March 13, 1986. This law was created «responding fundamentally to the mandate of article 104 of the Constitution», according to which an Organic Act should determine the functions, basic principles of action and statutes of the State Security Forces and Corps. This law meant for the DGP the integration of the Superior Police Corps and the Corps of National Police into the National Police Corps (CNP).

Also that year, the Directorate for State Security was raised to the rank of Secretariat of State and the Directorate-General of the Police was raised to the rank of general secretariat. Likewise, the DGP leaves the building of the Royal House of the Post Office and establishes its headquarters in the palace of the number 5 of Miguel Ángel Street. In 1987, the State security organs were reformed, and the deputy director-general (Subdirector general) was renamed as deputy director-general of Operations (Subdirector General Operativo), the General Commissariat for Public Safety (abolished in 1984) is recovered, and the Inspectorate-General of the Police and some divisions are suppressed and other organs are created with a level of deputy directorate-general.

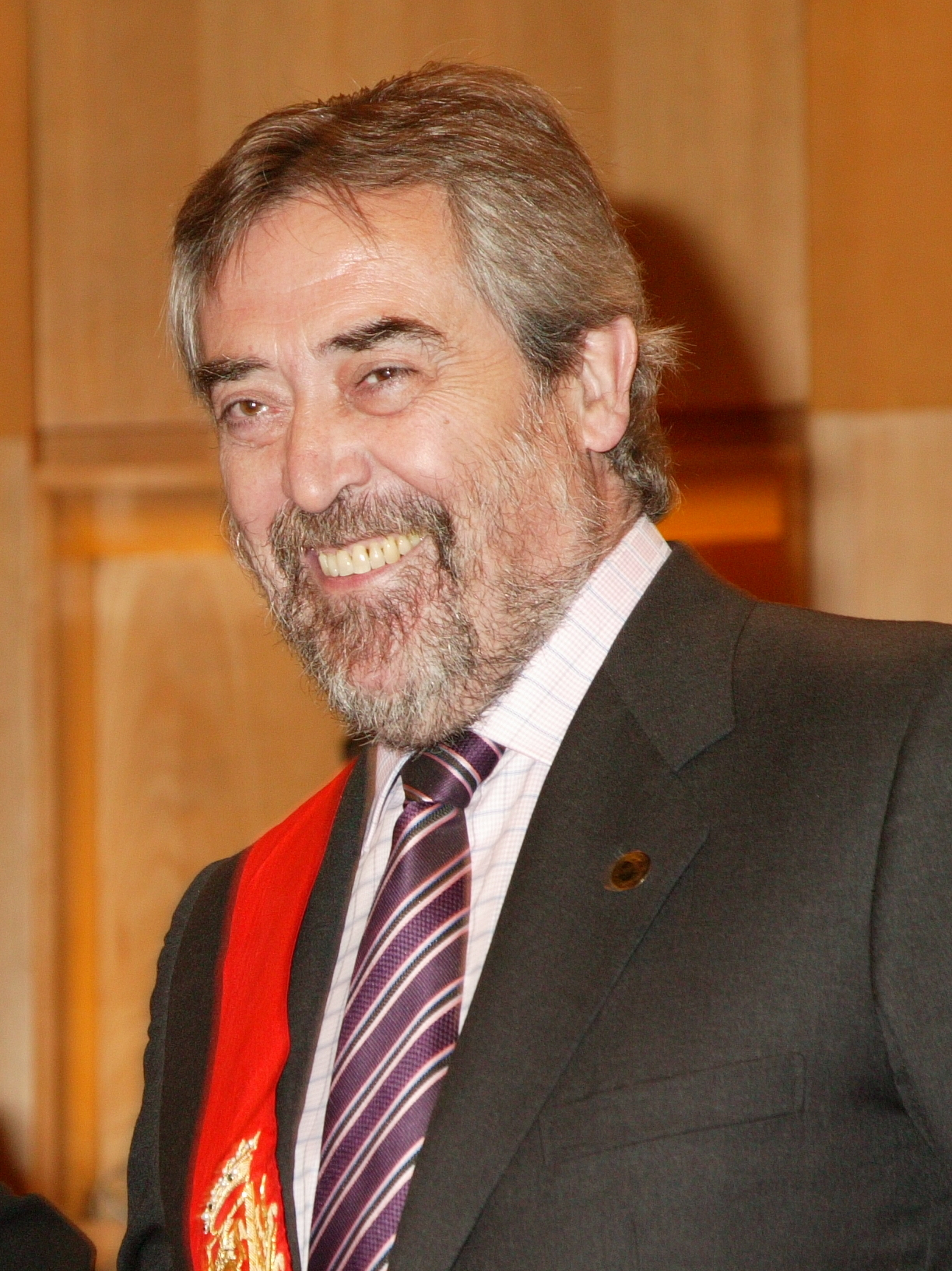
Juan Alberto Belloch, the only person to hold at the same time the portfolios of Justice and Interior.

=== Ministry of Justice and Interior ===
In 1994 a new phenomenon occurs, such as the integration of two important departments, that of Justice and that of the Interior. Through this integration a super-ministry was created with powers in judicial and security affairs. The DGP is renamed as General Secretariat-Directorate-General of Police (since 1986 it had the rank of general secretariat) until 1996, when both departments separated. It is during this reform when the General Commissariat for Scientific Police is created.

In 2000 the Government Delegation for Immigration and Foreigners was created, an organ with which the DGP had to coordinate to exercise its powers in these matters until 2004, when it was abolished and the immigration and foreigners policy passes to the Ministry of Labour and Social Affairs.

==== Single control and current split ====
Between September 2006 and December 2011, the Directorates-General of the Police and of the Civil Guard were merged by Prime Minister Zapatero with the purpose of «carry out the tasks of both police forces in a more integral, homogeneous and coordinated way». In 2008, it was known that the Interior Minister, Alfredo Pérez Rubalcaba, was not comfortable with this union of command and wanted to split them again, but that wasn't the opinion of the Prime Minister and remained together. In 2009 it was created the University Center of the Civil Guard, integrated in the directorate-general. During this time both agencies maintained their differentiated structure and legal regime, with a different Coordination Office for each body. In addition, the positions of Deputy Directors of Operations (Director Adjunto Operativo, DAO) were created as a technical assistance organ to the director-general. There was one DAO for each law enforcement agency.

With the arrival of Prime Minister Rajoy to the government and the appointment of Juan Ignacio Zoido as Interior Minister, they decided to split the command again considering that the coordination task was a duty of the Secretary of State for Security and that every agency needed to have their own command. In July 2017, Minister Zoido abolished the positions of Deputy Directors of Operations, a decision that was reversed by Minister Fernando Grande-Marlaska in July of the following year.

== Organizational structure ==
=== Central structure ===
The Directorate-General, led by the Director-General, is integrated by:

- The Office of the Deputy Director of Operations, responsible for collaborating with the Director-General in the direction of the functions of maintaining order and citizen security, and directly responsible for the direction, coordination and supervision of the central, supraterritorial and territorial police units; the monitoring and control of the results of the operational programs, and the definition of the human and material resources applicable to said programs. The DAO's Office acts as the National Central Office of Interpol, the National Unit of Europol and the Sirene Office.
  - General Commissariat of Information.
  - General Commissariat of Judiciary Police.
  - General Commissariat for Public Safety.
  - General Commissariat for Immigration and Borders.
  - General Commissariat of Scientific Police.
- The Deputy Directorate-General for Human Resources and Training, in charge of collaborating with the Director-General in the direction and coordination of both the management of DGP staff and their selection and training.
  - Personnel Division.
  - Training and Improvement Division.
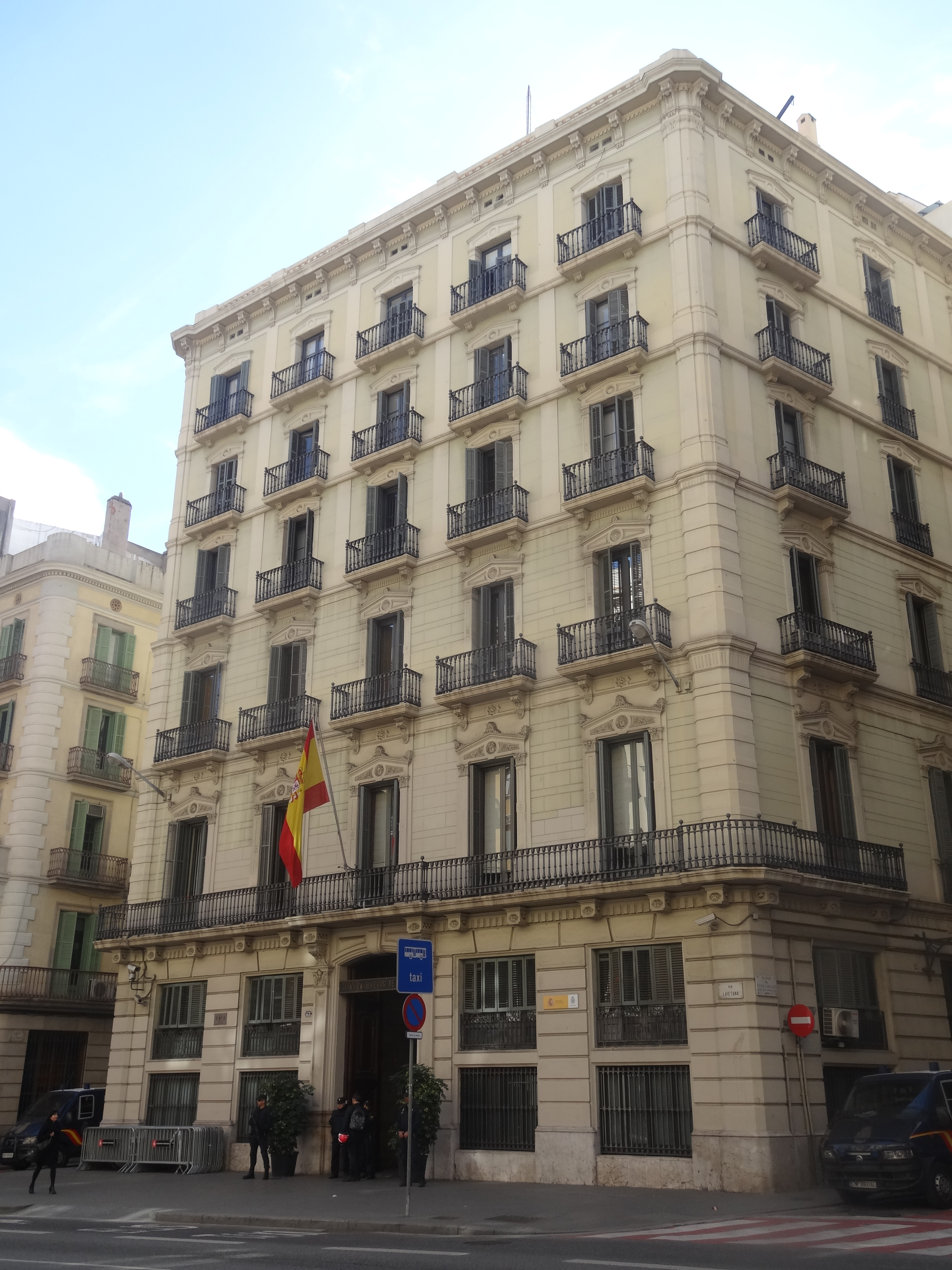
    Higher Office of Police in Barcelona, Catalonia.
- The Deputy Directorate-General for Logistics and Innovation, in charge of collaborating with the Director-General in the direction, coordination and management of economic and material resources, as well as of the documentation of Spaniards and foreigners, and police records.
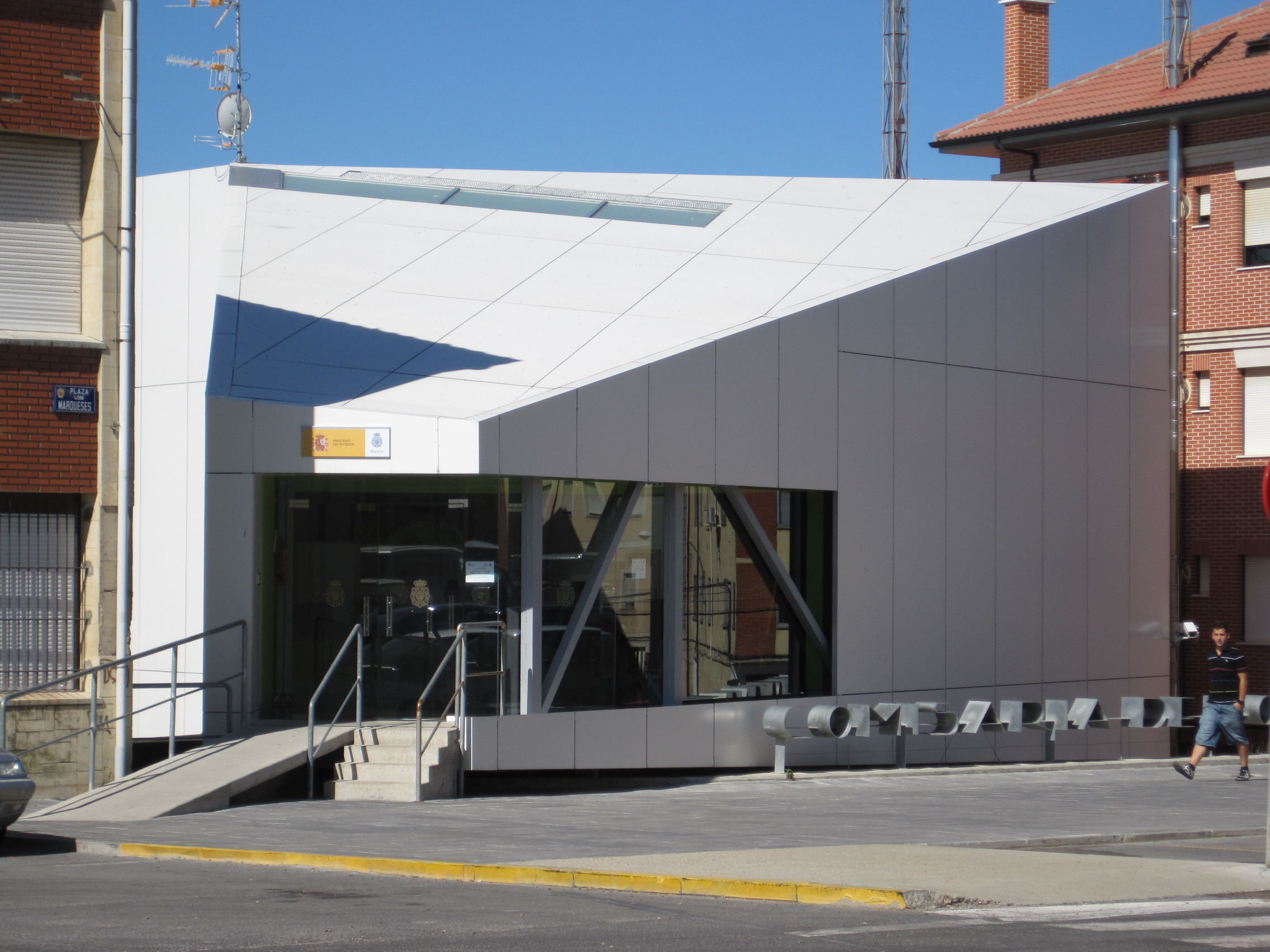
- A police station in Astorga, Castile and León.
  The International Cooperation Division, which is responsible for directing the collaboration and assistance to the foreign police agencies and the coordination of the working groups in which the DGP participates in the field of the European Union and other international institutions, as well as aspects related to missions of support to third countries and police personnel serving abroad.
  - Economic and Technical Division.
  - Documentation Division.

=== Peripheral structure ===
The peripheral structure is integrated by:

- The Highier Offices of Police, one in every region.
- The Provincial police stations.
- The Zonal police stations, which are police stations with jurisdiction over several districts.
- The Local and District Police Stations.
- The Joint or Mixed Police Stations, which are special police stations shared with neighbour countries.
- The Border Police Offices.
- The Documentation Units.

== Budget ==
The Directorate-General of the Police has a budget of € 3,960,133,110 for 2023. It is divided as follows:

Budget of the Directorate-General for 2023
Program No.	Program	Amount	Ref.
131N	Training of State Security Forces and Corps	€85,336,750	
131O	Forces and Corps in reserve	€93,424,680	
132A	Citizen security	€3,709,069,780	
132C	Police operations in drug matters	€72,301,900	
DGP's total budget		€3,960,133,110	

== See also ==
- Law enforcement in Spain
- Law enforcement in the European Union
- National Police Corps
- Directorate-General of the Civil Guard
