= Ricardo Peralta =

Ricardo Peralta may refer to:

- Ricardo Peralta y Fabi (1950–2017), Mexican astronaut trainee and academic
- Ricardo Peralta Ortega (born 1951), Spanish politician
