= Operation Gemini =

- Operation name: Operation Gemini
- Type: Child pornography crackdown
- Scope: Multinational

Participants
- Planned by: National Police Corps of Spain
- Executed by: National Police Corps of Spain, Judicial Police of Spain, National Police of Pamplona, Interpol and others
- No. of countries participating: 21

Mission
- Objective: The disruption of a paedophile ring commanded by Luís María G. A., codenamed Cupilover

Timeline
- Date executed: 2001

Results
- Arrests: 9 responsible for the servers and 54 others

Operación Géminis (Operation Gemini) was an international operation against an internet ring that produced and sold child pornography amongst servers distributed in 21 countries. It was described by the National Police Corps of Spain as "one of the most important [operations] from Europe".

== Criminal activities ==
According to the police, the crime ring began its operation in 2020 and distributed more than 20,000 images and videos of child pornography through 54 servers spread in 21 countries through mailing lists called Nudeboys and Clubteenboys. The material contained minors, including babies, posing naked or practicing sexual activities. The videos were 60 to 90 minutes long and cost from 3,900 to 6,500 pesetas plus the mailing costs.

The group was led by Luís María G. A., codenamed Cupilover, a 47 year-old man from Pamplona who owned a porn videotape store in Navarre. In 1986, he was accused by a Pamplona court of prostitution and corruption of minors practiced on Jarauta st. number 96, Navarre.

== Operation ==
The operation was coordinated by José Luis Torres, from the Brigade of Technological Delinquency of the National Police Corps, together with the Judicial Police of Spain, the National Police of Pamplona, Interpol and others. It happened simultaneously in 21 countries, including United States, Canada, Argentina, Mexico, Chile, Ecuador, Puerto Rico, Germany, Switzerland, Denmark, Finland, Holland, United Kingdom, Serbia, New Zealand, Australia, Thailand, Philippines, South Korea and Malaysia.

The police arrested Luís María and the others responsible for the servers, being José Luis H. R., Fernando C. M., Ricardo A. del P., Jorge Luis R.H., Enrique C. S., Juan Daniel F. P., Miguel Ángel E. M. and Ángeles C. M. The arrests happened in Santander, Barcelona, Alcorcón, Seville, Roquetas de Mar, El Astillero, Málaga and Madrid. Other 54 people were arrested, accused of production, diffusion and selling child pornography through the internet and 80 buyers were identified. According to the police, they were sure the entire network was shut down. The police also apprehended 8 computers, one laptop, 200 videotapes, 8 zip files, several e-mail correspondences, HDs, floppy disks, CDs and CD recorders.

The accused were judged in liberty by the Court of Instruction number 1, from Pamplona, the same organ responsible for the investigation. They could be sentenced from one to three years in prison.
