= Ana Botella Gómez =

Spanish politician (born 1958)

The Most Excellent Ana Botella Gómez MP
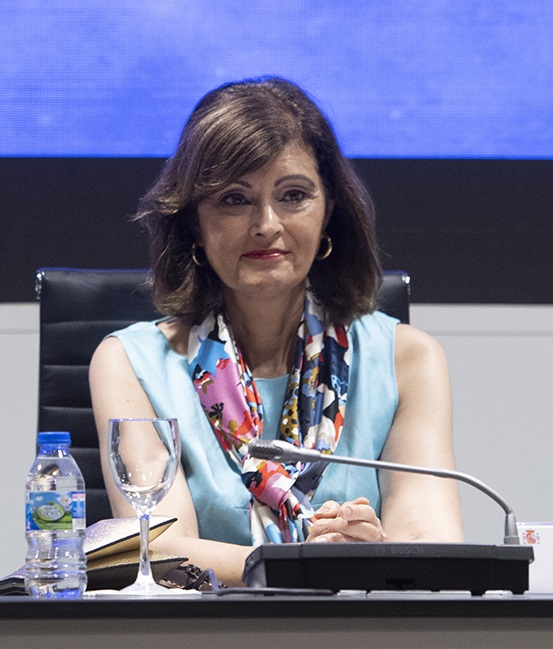
- Ana Botella in 2019

11th Secretary of State for Security
- In office 19 June 2018 – 18 January 2020
- Preceded by: José Antonio Nieto Ballesteros
- Succeeded by: Rafael Pérez Ruiz

Member of the Congress of Deputies
- Incumbent
- Assumed office 13 January 2016
- Constituency: Valencia

Personal details
- Born: Ana María Botella Gómez; 12 February 1958 (age 68) Valencia, Spain
- Party: Socialist Party
- Education: University of Valencia

Ana Botella Gómez (born 12 February 1958) is a Spanish politician of the Socialist Party serving as Member of the Congress of Deputies representing Valencia. From 2018 to 2020, she served as the 11th Secretary of State for Security of the Government of Spain.

== Biography ==
Botella was born in the Valencia in 1958. She has a degree in Geography and History by the University of Valencia, being one of the best of the promotion and awarded with the Extraordinary Degree Award. She also has a Diploma in Foreign Trade from the UNED (1984), a Master in Public Management from the Polytechnic University of Valencia (1995 - 1997), and a Diploma as University Specialist in International Security and Conflicts, from the Gutiérrez Mellado-UNED University Institute (2014).

As a civil servant, she has develop her career in the Regional Administration of Valencia. There, she served as Director-General of the Valencian Tourist Institute within the Regional Ministry of Industry, Trade and Tourism and as Chief of the Area of Promotion of Innovation and Competitiveness of the current Valencian Institute for Business Competitiveness.

Between 2007 and 2010 she served as Councillor of the City Council of Valencia with the Spanish Socialist Workers' Party. In 2010, prime minister José Luis Rodríguez Zapatero appointed her as Central Government' Delegate in the Valencian Community replacing Ricardo Peralta Ortega until 2012.

She made the leap to national politics in 2016, when she was elected MP by the Province of Valencia in the 2015 general election. She was re-elected in the 2016 and 2019 general elections. In June 2018, Interior Minister Fernando Grande-Marlaska appointed her as Secretary of State for Security, the second highest position within the Interior Ministry. She left the office on January 18, 2020, and she was replaced by the Minister's chief of staff, Rafael Pérez Ruiz.

== Awards ==
- Grand Cross of the Order of Merit of the Civil Guard (2024)
- Gold Cross of the Order of Merit for Security (2025)
