= General Commissariat of Information =

Spanish intelligence service

- Comisaría General de Información
- Emblem of the General Commissariat of Information

Agency overview
- Formed: November 28, 1912; 113 years ago
- Jurisdiction: Spain
- Headquarters: Madrid, Spain
- Employees: Classified
- Annual budget: Classified
- Agency executive: Eugenio Pereiro Blanco, Commissioner-General
- Parent department: Ministry of Interior
- Website: www.policia.es

The General Commissariat of Information (Spanish: Comisaría General de Información, CGI) is an intelligence service within the National Police Corps of Spain responsible for the collection, analysis and distribution of information relevant to domestic security, as well as its exploitation or operational use, especially in matters of counterterrorism, both nationally and internationally.

It is colloquially named secret police, though in Spain the name of secret police is usually used to any police officer in plainclothes.

== History ==
The General Commissariat of Information was created in November 1912 along with the Directorate-General for Security (currently Directorate-General of the Police) as a "center where all the data and information from the national territory flows, related to the maintenance of general order and the prevention and prosecution of crimes (...)".

In 1939 it was renamed as General Commissariat of Information. According to the agreements of the Council of Ministers, this service has the rank of secret, and his structure, budget, resources, procedures and agents can not be revealed.

== TEDAX ==
From the General Commissariat of Information depends the special unit called TEDAX-NRBQ. TEDAX is the Spanish name for the units trained in bomb disposal.

== See also ==
- Civil Guard Information Service (Civil Guard counterpart)
- General Commissariat of Judiciary Police
- Spanish Intelligence Community
- National Intelligence Center
