= Director General of the Police (Spain) =

Director-General of the Police
- Director General de la Policía
- Badge of the National Police Corps

- Flag of the National Police Corps

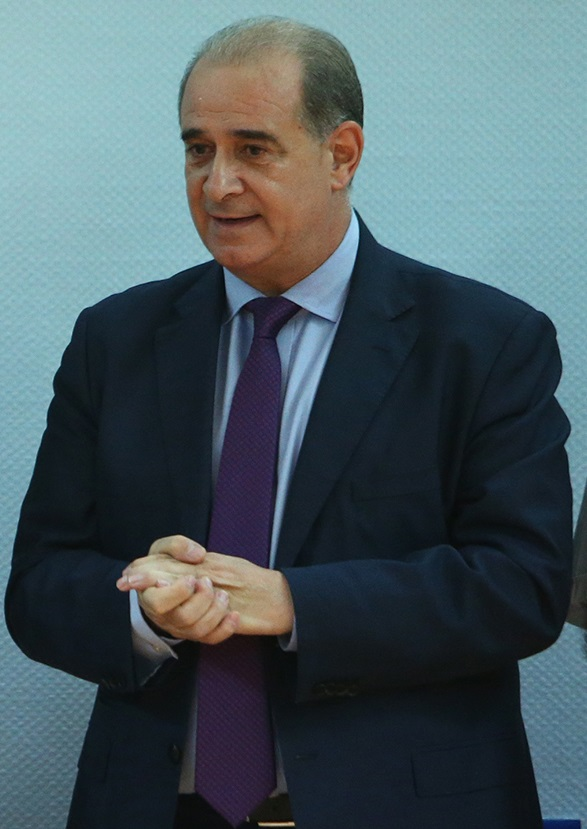
- Incumbent; Francisco Pardo Piqueras since June 30, 2018
- Ministry of the Interior; Secretariat of State for Security; Directorate-General of the Police
- Style: The Most Excellent (formal); Mr. Director General (informal)
- Abbreviation: DGP
- Reports to: Secretary of State for Security
- Nominator: Interior Minister
- Appointer: Monarch
- Formation: January 8, 1824 (as General Superintendence of Police); May 10, 1979 (current structure)
- First holder: José Sainz González
- Deputy: Deputy Director of Operations
- Website: National Police Corps website

The Director-General of the Police (DGP) of Spain is a high-ranking official in the Ministry of the Interior. The director-general is nominated by the Minister of Home Affairs after consulting to the Council of Ministers and is appointed by the Monarch. The director-general reports directly to the Secretary of State for Security and has rank of Under Secretary.

The director-general heads the Directorate-General, commands the National Police Corps and is in charge of the ordination, direction, coordination and execution of the missions entrusted to the police fulfilling with the orders received from the Ministry of the Interior. In addition, the director-general directs and coordinates the services and the central and peripheral organs of the National Police. The director-general is also in charge of giving its personnel the human and material resources to fulfill with their obligations, to establish collaboration relationships with other public and private bodies, to oversight the behavior of the personnel, to promote or degrade the police officers and promoting activities to improve the training of the officers.

In the international sphere, the director-general is the official responsible to offer the collaboration and help of the National Police Corps to other foreign law enforcements agencies, to collect, analyse and distribute information between national and international bodies necessary to guarantee the security of the country or allied countries and is also in charge of the matters relating foreigners, passports, IDs, drugs, and gambling.

== History ==
The current office of Director-General of the Police was created on May 10, 1979 to lead the two main law-enforcement agencies that at that time formed the police: the Superior Police Corps and the National Police Corps.

The Superior Police Corps, commonly known as Secret Police, were a police force responsible for the investigation of crimes, the recollection and analysis of information, the issuance of passports and IDs, as well as controlling migration matters and cooperate with foreign police corps. The National Police Corps was designed as an auxiliary police corps of the Superior Police Corps and was oriented to grant the security of citizens as well as patrol and protect police buildings.

In 1986, a new Police Forces Act was approved and a major change happened. The two law-enforcement agencies —Superior Police Corps and National Police Corps— merged into one national forced that assumed all the competencies of the service, becoming the now unified National Police Corps.

Between September 2006 and December 2011, the Directorates-General of the Police and of the Civil Guard were merged by Prime Minister Zapatero with the purpose of «carry out the tasks of both police forces in a more integral, homogeneous and coordinated way». In 2008, it was known that the Interior Minister, Alfredo Pérez Rubalcaba, was not comfortable with this union of command and wanted to split them again, but that wasn't the opinion of the Prime Minister and remained together.

With the arrival of Prime Minister Rajoy to the government, he decided to split the command again considering that the coordination task was a duty of the Secretary of State for Security and that every agency needed to have their own command.

== List of directors general ==
No.	Name	Appointed	Dismissed
Director General of the Police
1	José Sainz González	19 May 1979	11 March 1980
2	José Manuel Blanco Benítez	11 March 1980	16 March 1981
3	José Luis Fernández Dopico	16 March 1981	8 December 1982
4	Rafael del Río Sendino	8 December 1982	27 October 1986
5	José María Rodríguez Colorado	27 October 1986	27 July 1991
6	Carlos Conde Duque	27 July 1991	20 June 1994
7	Angel Olivares Ramírez	20 June 1994	8 May 1996
8	Juan Gabriel Cotino Ferrer	8 May 1996	27 July 2002
9	Agustín Díaz de Mera García Consuegra	27 July 2002	1 May 2004
10	Víctor García Hidalgo	1 May 2004	12 September 2006
Director General of the Police and Civil Guard
11	Juan Mesquida Ferrando	12 September 2006	22 April 2008
12	Francisco Javier Velázquez	22 April 2008	31 December 2011
Director General of the Police
13	Ignacio Cosidó Gutiérrez	31 December 2011	19 November 2016
14	Germán López Iglesias	19 November 2016	30 June 2018
15	Francisco Pardo Piqueras	30 June 2018	Incumbent
