= Jaime Giménez Arbe =

Spanish bank robber

- Born: January 12, 1956 (age 70); Las Rozas, Madrid, Spain
- Other name: El Solitario (The Loner)
- Occupation: Bank Robber
- Conviction: Homicide (two counts)
- Penalty: 47 years imprisonment

Details
- Country: Spain, Portugal

Jaime Giménez Arbe (also spelled Jiménez: (Note: The spelling Jiménez has been used in some press reports, though the correct spelling is Giménez, as he wrote it in a letter signed by himself and shown to press photographers by his lawyer Mariano Trillo-Figueroa)) born Madrid, 12 January 1956) is a Spanish bank robber known as El Solitario ("The Loner").

He admitted to more than thirty armed robberies of banks all over Spain, and was also convicted of the murder of two Civil Guards in Castejón (Navarra). In addition, in La Vall d'Uixó (Castellón), during an exchange of fire with El Solitario, one policeman died due to a stray bullet fired by another policeman. He was sentenced to 47 years' imprisonment in July 2008.

He has two sons with his British ex-wife Anne.

== Detention ==
He was arrested on 23 July 2007, in Figueira da Foz as part of "Operation Gloria". A large number of police officers, both Spanish (National Police officers and Civil Guards from the Central Operational Unit) and Portuguese (Judiciary Police) were there to arrest him while he was, presumably, about to rob the “Caixa Agrícola” Bank, located on Saraiva de Carvalho Street, near the market. He was charged with the murder of two Civil Guards, whom he shot after they asked him to identify himself.

When he was arrested, he was disguised with false beard, mustache and wig and, as always, he wore his bulletproof vest and carried three guns: two short ones and an automatic one. The unprecedented police presence looking for him ended a decade of crimes that made him one of the most wanted criminals in Spanish criminal history. In his usual dwelling, and also in a warehouse of his own, large numbers of guns and amounts of ammunition were found, as well as articles of disguise.

He was taken to Coimbra, where he was to make a statement before a judge. At the court door, before the many curious people and the media, he shouted "Hola a todos, soy El Solitario. ¡Salud españoles!" ("Hi, everyone. I’m The Loner. Here’s to you, Spain!")

== Stay in prison ==
On 27 July 2007 he started a hunger strike as a protest against being moved to a high security level prison. He stopped the protest two days later.

According to his lawyers, Portuguese Elisa Maia and Spanish José Mariano Trillo-Figueroa in an August 2007 press-conference, he admitted being a robber, but denied having murdered the three people of whose deaths he is accused, claiming that the former Civil Guard General Enrique Rodríguez Galindo, and the former President of the Regional Government of Extremadura Juan Carlos Rodríguez Ibarra were involved in the shooting of a shepherd in Zafra. and stating "I am innocent of the death of the two civil guards of Castejón and of a municipal policeman of Vall D "Uixó. It is my word of honor. I am not a murderer and if I have been forced to shoot law enforcement officers it has always been against my will and to avoid my arrest." He also admitted the robberies, stating "I robbed banks in order to liberate the Spanish from the banks’ thefts".

== Trial ==
During his trial in the Navarra Provincial High Court in July 2008, Jaime Giménez Arbe pleaded not guilty to the charge of murder of two Civil Guards, as well as declaring himself antisystem and anarchist and defining his robberies as “bank expropriation”. He also said he had started his criminal career with Corsican anti-capitalist groups, with which he committed his first robbery. Those sworn statements are similar to the ones in the letter he wrote in a letter to “public opinion” during his stay in Zuera prison.

He was found guilty of the murder in 2004 of the two Civil Guards, and was sentenced to 47 years' imprisonment.

=== Criminal record ===
| Date | Town | Province | Country | Details |
|---|---|---|---|---|
| January 18, 1993 | Adamuz | Córdoba | Spain | He used a Citroen C15, and was possibly helped by his brother. This bank does not exist any more. |
| May 2, 1994 | Viveiro | Lugo | Spain | Robbed a Banco Exterior de España office. Appropriated 5,700,000 pesetas. |
| May 10, 1996 | Zafra | Badajoz | Spain | Shooting with the Civil Guard outside a savings bank in which Arbe was wounded. He used a Renault 4 sadan, the plates of which belonged to a shepherd who was later mistakenly shot by the Civil Guard. |
| May 22, 1998 | Melide | A Coruña | Spain | Robbed a Caixa Galicia Bank office. |
| July 4, 1998 | Teruel | Teruel | Spain | Fled in a jeep after appropriating 1,778,000 pesetas from a CAI office. |
| September 4, 1998 | Binéfar | Huesca | Spain | Appropriated 3,997,000 pesetas from an Ibercaja office. |
| November 26, 1998 | Jumilla | Murcia | Spain | Robbed a CAM office and appropriated ₧12,600,000 million. |
| March 5, 1999 | La Roda | Albacete | Spain | Appropriated 3,000,000 pesetas from a Caja de Ahorros de Castilla La Mancha office. |
| April 23, 1999 | Socuéllamos | Ciudad Real | Spain | Attacked a CCM office and appropriated two million pesetas. |
| June 10, 1999 | Calahorra | La Rioja | Spain | Appropriated 1,197,000 pesetas from a Cajarioja office. |
| July 14, 1999 | A Estrada | Pontevedra | Spain | Appropriated 1,668,000 pesetas from a Caixa Pontevedra office. |
| July 15, 1999 | Chantada | Lugo | Spain | |
| September 2, 1999 | Alfaro | La Rioja | Spain | Appropriated more than 3,000,000 pesetas from the Ibercaja office in Alfaro's España Square.. |
| October 14, 1999 | Calamocha | Teruel | Spain | Appropriated 4,100,000 pesetas from an Ibercaja office. Fled in a Suzuki. |
| October 15, 1999 | Cariñena | Zaragoza | Spain | |
| December 23, 1999 | Mula | Murcia | Spain | As he was leaving, he said “Merry Christmas” to those present. |
| May 10, 2000 | La Vall d'Uixó | Castellón | Spain | Robbed a Caja Rural de San Isidro office, appropriating 3,300,000 pesetas. There was an exchange of fire with local police. One police officer died as a result of a shot by another. |
| December 22, 2000 | Gallur | Zaragoza | Spain | |
| June 14, 2001 | Pina de Ebro | Zaragoza | Spain | |
| August 18, 2001 | Cee | A Coruña | Spain | |
| October 9, 2001 | Zuera | Zaragoza | Spain | |
| January 23, 2002 | Calasparra | Murcia | Spain | Appropriated his largest amount in robberies up to then, more than €100,000. He carried out no more robberies for a year. |
| March 26, 2003 | Pozoblanco | Córdoba | Spain | Robbed a CajaSur office and appropriated €30,000. Fled in a Suzuki Vitara. |
| August 20, 2003 | Vilalba | Lugo | Spain | |
| September 19, 2003 | Torrijos | Toledo | Spain | Robbed a CCM office located in España Square. |
| June 9, 2004 | Castejón | Navarra | Spain | Killed two Civil Guards with a sub-machine gun, after a failed robbery in La Rioja (Spain). |
| April 20, 2006 | Sarria | Lugo | Spain | Shot a clerk in the leg and fled with €835,000. |
| May 10, 2006 | Alcobendas | Madrid | Spain | In La Moraleja district. Fled in a Renault Kangoo. |
| May 12, 2006 | Tres Cantos | Madrid | Spain | |
| October 10, 2006 | L'Alcúdia | Valencia | Spain | Robbed the Banco Popular office located in Antoni Almela Street, and appropriated €6,000. |
| November 11, 2006 | Ávila | Ávila | Spain | Robbed #8 Caja Ávila office, located between Virgen de las Angustias Street and Padre Victoriano Street. |
| December 14, 2006 | San Agustín del Guadalix | Madrid | Spain | Appropriated €10,000. This office had been previously robbed more than ten times. |
| February 7, 2007 | Madrid | Madrid | Spain | In Canillas district, 200 meters away from the Judge Police Station. |
| May 18, 2007 | Toro | Zamora | Spain | Shot a clerk in the leg, and fled with €6,000. |
| July 23, 2007 | Figueira da Foz | Coimbra | Portugal | Arrested as he was going to rob a bank in Figueira da Foz, Portugal. |

== Representations in media ==
- Soy El Solitario (I am The Loner) is a Spanish TV-miniseries by Manuel Ríos San Martín based on the investigation that lead to the arrest of Arbe.
- Me llaman el Solitario: autobiografía de un expropiador de bancos (ISBN 84-8136-564-5) is an autobiography by Arbe with foreword by Lucio Urtubia. published in 2009.
- La caza del solitario: documentary series released in 2015 and created by Carles Porta.
