= Ignacio Ulloa Rubio =

Ignacio Ulloa Rubio (born in Madrid in 1967) is a Spanish Judge and a member of the European General Court.

He studied in Madrid's (Complutense University). He was the Spanish's Secretary of State of Security between 2011 and 2013. He can speak Spanish, French, English, and has knowledge of German and Arabic. He is married and has two children.
