= Civil Guard Information Service =

Intelligence service within the Spanish Civil Guard

- Servicio de Información de la Guardia Civil
- Emblem of the Information Service

Agency overview
- Formed: February 24, 1941; 85 years ago
- Jurisdiction: Spain
- Headquarters: Madrid, Spain
- Employees: Classified
- Annual budget: Classified
- Agency executive: Div. General Luis Peláez Piñeiro, Commander
- Parent department: Ministry of Interior
- Parent agency: Civil Guard

The Civil Guard Information Service (Spanish: Servicio de Información de la Guardia Civil, SIGC) is an intelligence service within the Spanish Civil Guard responsible for the collection, analysis and distribution of information relevant to domestic security, as well as its exploitation or operational use, especially in matters of counterterrorism, both nationally and internationally.

As established in the Agreements of the Council of Ministers of November 28, 1986 and February 16, 1996, the structure, organization, resources and specific operating procedures of the Information Services and those specifically destined to the fight against terrorism, as well as such as its sources and any information or data that may reveal them, is classified information.

== History ==
During the second half of the 19th century and the beginning of the 20th century, the main problems faced by the Civil Guard were banditry and anarchist terrorism. Due to this, the first investigation and information units were created to put an end to these acts, as happened with the other Spanish police forces (Surveillance Corps and Security Corps). Likewise, in the 1930s the "Railway Brigades" were created, plainclothes groups in charge of monitoring rail transport and whose components, for the most part, ended up joining the SIGC.

However, the origin of an information service as such dates back to 1940. That year, the Civil Guard was completely reorganized by means of the Law of March 15, 1940 and the Order of April 8, 1940 that developed it, creating the Civil Guard' General Staff and mentioning for the first time an information service integrated in the Second Section of the General Staff.

To comply with this mandate, on February 24, 1941, the director-general of the Civil Guard issued a circular, completed by the reserved order of April 1, 1941, which contained the precise instructions for putting the service into operation, creating thus, officially, the Civil Guard Information Service (SIGC).

During the period of activity of the terrorist group ETA, the SIGC, together with the General Commissariat of Information (CGI), have been the most responsible for its combat and dismantling.

== See also ==
- Spanish Intelligence Community
- General Commissariat of Information (National Police counterpart)
- National Intelligence Center
