= Policía Foral =

Regional police of Navarre, Spain

Chartered Police of Navarre Policía Foral de Navarra Nafarroako Foruzaingoa

- Flag of the autonomous community of Navarre
- Common name: Policía Foral

Agency overview
- Formed: October 30, 1928
- Preceding agency: Cuerpo de Policía de Carreteras (1928-1963)

Jurisdictional structure
- Operations jurisdiction: Navarra, Spain
- Governing body: Government of Navarre
- Constituting instruments: Spanish Constitution of 1978; Ley Orgánica de Amejoramiento y Reintegración Foral de Navarra (1982)
- General nature: Local civilian police

Operational structure
- Headquarters: Calle Fuente de la Teja, s/n 31006 Pamplona-Iruña, Navarre, Spain
- Sworn members: 900
- Elected officer responsible: María José Beaumont
- Agency executive: Alfonso Fernández Díez, Chief
- Parent agency: Department of the Interior

Facilities
- Stations: List: Pamplona/Iruñea; Tudela/Tutera; Tafalla; Estella/Lizarra; Sangüesa/Zangoza; Altsasu; Elizondo

Website
- www.navarra.es/home_es/Temas/Seguridad

The Chartered Police of Navarre (Spanish: Policía Foral de Navarra, Basque: Nafarroako Foruzaingoa) is the autonomous police force for the chartered autonomous community of Navarre in Spain, largely replacing the Spanish Policía Nacional (National Police) and Guardia Civil (Civil Guard).

== Operation areas ==
It operates across the Community, and was founded from a traffic police unit set up by the Provincial Council of Navarre in 1929. As of 2020, the Spanish Civil Guard is gradually transferring one of its last competences in Navarre, traffic policing and highways patrolling to the Navarrese autonomous Police, leaving the Civil Guard to specific tasks in this Autonomous Community (as for Catalonia and the Basque Country).

== Organisation ==
As of 2007, the force had 925 police officers, with medium-term plans to increase that number to about 1,200.

The current standard issue sidearm for officers is the Glock 19 which has been in service since before 2010.

== Ranks ==
Ranks of the Policía Foral
| Insignia | | | | | | | no insignia |
| Spanish title | Jefe policía Foral | Comisario principal | Comisario | Inspector | Subinspector | Cabo | Agente Foral |
| Basque title | Foruzainburua | Komisario Nagusia | Komisarioa | Inspektorea | Inspektoreordea | Kaporala | Agentea |
| English translation | Foral police chief | Chief commissioner | Commissioner | Inspector | Sub-inspector | Corporal | Foral constable |
