= Policía Canaria =

Canary Islands Police Corps

General Police Corps of the Canary Islands Cuerpo General de la Policía Canaria
- Common name: Policía Autonómica de Canarias
- Abbreviation: CGPC

Agency overview
- Formed: June 30, 2010

Jurisdictional structure
- Operations jurisdiction: Canary Islands, Spain
- Legal jurisdiction: Canary Islands
- Governing body: Government of the Canary Islands
- Constituting instrument: Ley del Cuerpo General de la Policía Canaria (28 May 2008)
- General nature: Civilian police

Operational structure
- Headquarters: Santa Cruz de Tenerife y Las Palmas de Gran Canaria
- Sworn members: 295 (to be 1,700) (2024)
- Parent agency: Canary Islands Government

Website
- www.gobiernodecanarias.org/cgpoliciacanaria

The Cuerpo General Policía Canaria (CGPC) is the police force of the autonomous community of the Canary Islands, Spain. It was formed in 2010 by Paulino Rivero, the President of the Canary Islands.

== Role ==
The Ley del Cuerpo General de la Policía Canaria (English: Law of the General Police Corps of the Canary Islands), passed on 28 May 2008 by the Parliament of the Canary Islands, states that the functions of the police force include the guarding and protection of people, organs, buildings, facilities and installations of the autonomous community and its instrumental bodies, and to ensure compliance with the regulations and orders issued by the organs of the community, among others.

The term Policía Canaria (English: Canarian Police) includes the regional police and the local police bodies of the 88 Canary Island municipalities. It is nicknamed guanchancha, a portmanteau of "guanche" (the indigenous people of the islands) and Ertzaintza (the Basque police).

One hundred officers, 92 men and 8 women, made up the first promotion of the Canary Islands Police in a presentation ceremony held on June 30, 2010 at the Canary Islands Academy of Public Safety in Santa Cruz de Tenerife. The regional president said that this was only the first step in a deployment that will reach 1,700 officers in several phases.

Its first mission was to celebrate the Festival of the Virgen de las Nieves, on the island of La Palma.

The black uniforms of the riot police are very similar to those of the Mobile Brigade of the Basque police.

== Ranks ==
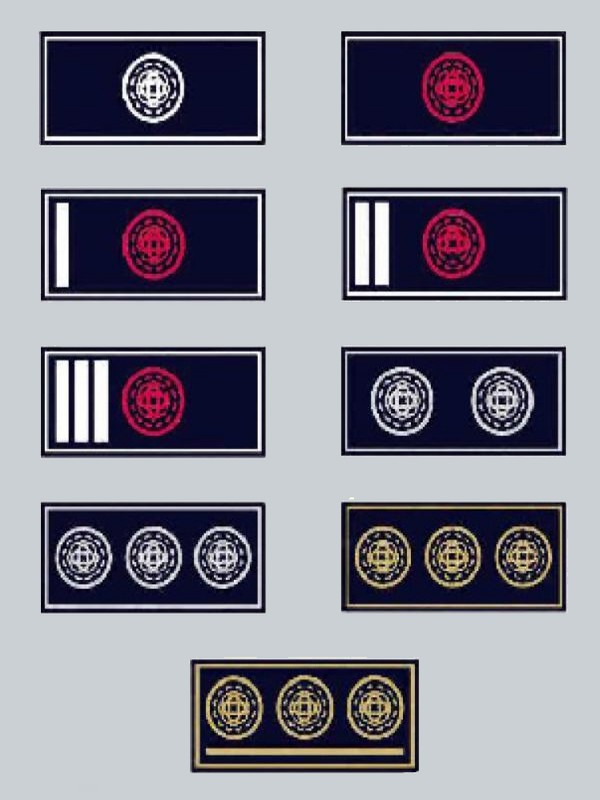
Rank insignias

- Polícia en prácticas (Trainee)
- Polícia (Constable)
- Oficial (Officer)
- Subinspector (Sub-Inspector)
- Inspector (Inspector)
- Subcomisario (Deputy Commissioner)
- Comisario (Commissioner)
- Comisario principal (Principal Commissioner)
- Comisario principal jefe (Chief Principal Commissioner)
