= Secretary of State for Security =

- Secretario de Estado de Seguridad
- Emblem of the Secretariat of State for Security

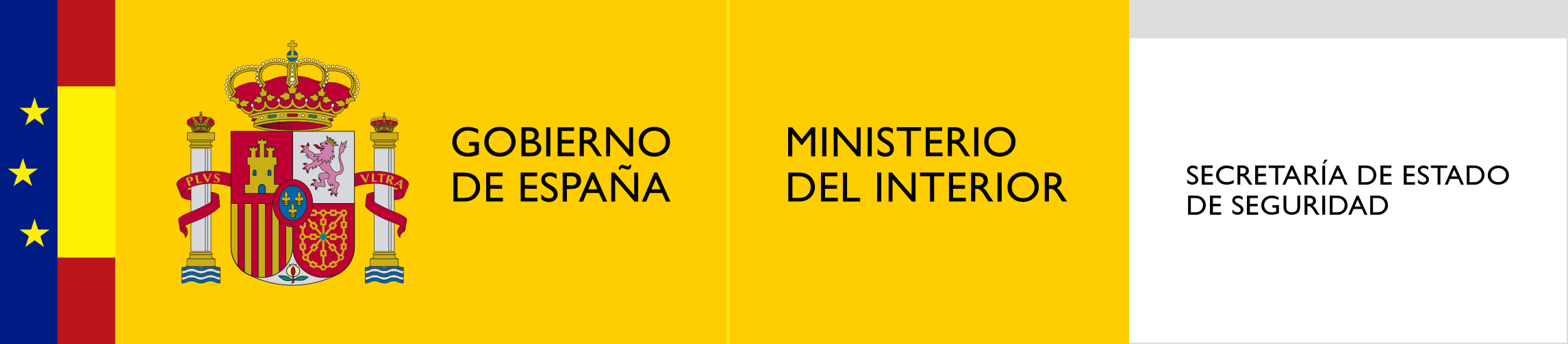

- Incumbent; Aina Calvo since 4 June 2025
- Ministry of the Interior; Secretariat of State for Security
- Style: The Most Excellent (formal); Mr./Ms. Secretary of State (informal)
- Abbreviation: SES
- Member of: National Security Council
- Nominator: The Interior Minister
- Appointer: The Monarch
- Precursor: Under-Secretary for Public Order
- Formation: 10 May 1979; 47 years ago
- First holder: Luis Alberto Salazar-Simpson
- Salary: Around €140,000 per year
- Website: Ministry of the Interior

The secretary of state for security, also known by its former name, director of State security, is a senior minister of the Spanish Ministry of the Interior responsible for assisting the minister of the interior in all matters related to public security.

In this regard, the secretary of state exercises command over the National-level security forces—National Police and Civil Guard—and coordinates the security responsibilities of other administrations. This high-ranking official is also entrusted with the responsibility of ensuring the exercise of constitutional rights and assists the minister with the department's international relations and cooperation.

The secretary of state for security is appointed by the Monarch on the advice of the Minister of the Interior and is a member of the National Security Council. Since 4 June 2025, Aina Calvo serves as secretary of state.

== History ==
This position was foreseen in the 1978 Police Act, although it was formally created by Royal Decree 1110/1979, of May 10, which established the police bodies. This norms replaced the position of Under-Secretary for Public Order (created in 1976) with a Director for State Security, with the rank of under-secretary. This new directorate was an intermediate coordinating body between the minister and the directors-general of the different police forces. Initially, the Directorate-General of the Police, which replaced the historic Directorate-General for Security—the main body responsible for the repression during the dictatorship—, and the police divisions for management and operations were the only attached bodies.

In June 1980, the position of Director for State Security was elevated to the rank of secretary of state, although this only lasted until December 1982, when was demoted again. During the 1981 Spanish coup attempt, Director Francisco Laína assumed the powers of prime minister.

In October 1986, the position was once more elevated to the rank of secretary of state, known since then as Secretary of State for Security-Director of the State Security. From 1994 to 1996, the position was named as Secretary of State of the Interior and, since 1996, it has been known as Secretary of State for Security.

== Structure ==
From the Secretary of State for Security depends:

- Director-General of the Police.
  It's the official which leads the civil department responsible for the direction and supervision of the National Police Corps actions, maintain international relationships with other police departments within the scope of its competences, issue of passports, IDs, immigration documents, private security licenses and other documents of its competence and provides the police with all the necessary materials (ammo, weapons, cars, helicopters...)
- Director-General of the Civil Guard.
  It's the official which leads the civil department responsible for the direction and supervision of the Civil Guard actions in coordination with the Ministry of Defence, establish the territorial organization of the Civil Guard, supervise the Civil Guard's competences over weapons and explosives, provide the police with all the necessary materials (ammo, weapons, cars, helicopters...) and to establish a fluent coordination between the Directorate-General and the Secretary of State for Migrations in the competences of the Civil Guard over foreigners.
- Director-General for International Relations and Immigration.
  The Director-General for International Relations and Immigration tops the Directorate-General for International Relations and Immigration which is responsible for the coordination of the international relations of the Ministry (highlighting mainly the European Union), the supervision of the police forces in embassies and other diplomatic missions abroad in coordination with the different directorates general of the police forces, the participation in the negotiations of international agreements over security and the supervision and improvement proposal over the migration issue.
- Director-General for Coordination and Studies.
  - The Director-General for Coordination and Studies tops the Directorate-General for Coordination and Studies which is responsible for supporting and advising the Secretary of State in the coordination of the police forces. This body also designs the plans about citizen security and it does statistical studies about criminality, among others.
- Deputy Director-General for Planning and Management of Infrastructures and Means for Security.
  It's responsible for planning the investments in security infrastructures, for proposing and overseen the works in the scope of security, manage and execute the programs of its competence coming from European founds, manage the Ministry's goods and carry out all the competences that the Secretary of State delegates on it.
- Deputy Director-General for Information and Communications Systems for Security.
  It's responsible for planning the investments in information and communications systems, standardize and homogenize these systems, the proposal of acquisition of new systems and modernition of the existed, manage and execute the programs of its competence coming from European founds, coordinate and develop data bases, communication systems and information systems (highlighting that related with the Eu-Lisa, Schengen system and with the Digital Emergency Radio State System), coordinate the investments in security R&D and the direction of the Security Technological Center.

The secretary of state oversees the Intelligence Center for Counter-Terrorism and Organized Crime (CITCO).

== List of secretaries of state ==
- Luis Alberto Salazar-Simpson (1979–1980)
- Francisco Laína (1980–1982)
- Rafael Vera Fernández-Huidobro (1982–1984)
- Julián Sancristóbal (1984–1986)
- Rafael Vera Fernández-Huidobro (1986–1994)
- Margarita Robles (1994–1996)
- Ricardo Martí Fluxá (1996–2000)
- Pedro Morenés (2000–2002)
- Ignacio Astarloa (2002–2004)
- Antonio Camacho Vizcaíno (2004–2011)
- Justo Tomás Zambrana Pineda (2011)
- Ignacio Ulloa Rubio (2011–2013)
- Francisco Martínez Vázquez (2013–2016)
- José Antonio Nieto Ballesteros (2016–2018)
- Ana Botella Gómez (2018–2020)
- Rafael Pérez Ruiz (2020–2025)
- Aina Calvo (2025–present)

== See also ==
- Law enforcement in Spain
- Order of Merit of the Civil Guard
- Order of Police Merit
- Order of Merit for Security
