= Francisco Pardo =

Spanish politician

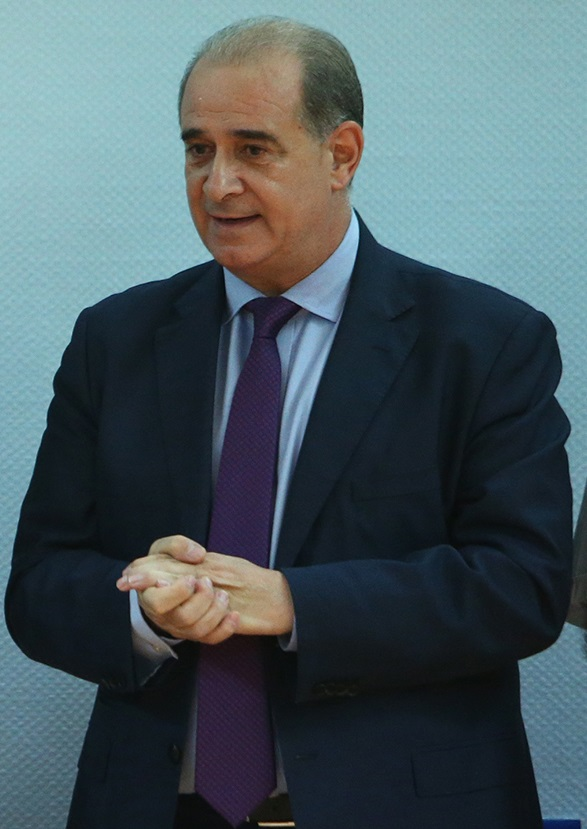

Director-General of the Police
- Incumbent
- Assumed office 30 June 2018
- Monarch: Felipe VI
- Prime Minister: Pedro Sánchez
- Preceded by: Germán López Iglesias

8th Secretary of State for Defence
- In office 20 April 2004 – 24 April 2007
- Monarch: Juan Carlos I
- Prime Minister: José Luis Rodríguez Zapatero
- Preceded by: Fernando Díez Moreno
- Succeeded by: Soledad López Fernández

Personal details
- Born: Francisco Pardo Piqueras; 13 February 1962 (age 64) Abengibre, Spain
- Party: Spanish Socialist Workers' Party
- Education: University of Murcia

Francisco Pardo (born 13 February 1962) is a Spanish politician serving as Director-General of the Police since June 1, 2018. Pardo is a member of the Spanish Socialist Workers' Party and he has previously served as the 8th Secretary of State for Defence from 2004 to 2007.

At regional level, Pardo has served as Speaker of the Castile-La Mancha regional parliament from 2007 to 2011, member of parliament from 2007 to 2012 and as Regional Minister for the Presidency of the Castile-La Mancha government from 2003 to 2004.

== Biography ==
Pardo is graduated in Law by the University of Murcia and has a master in European Law by the University of Castile-La Mancha. Member of the Socialist Party since its youth, his first political responsibilities were in the Regional Ministry of Agriculture of the Government of Castile-La Mancha, where he served as Chief of Staff to the Regional Minister from 1988 to 1993. He also served as Director-General for Institutional Relations of the Presidency of Castile-La Mancha from 1993 to 1999. He was a member of the Joint Committee for Devolutions State-Castile-La Mancha and member of the European Committee of the Regions from 1994 to 1995.

He continued serving in regional offices such as Chief of Staff to the President of Castile-La Mancha from 1999 to 2001 and Secretary-General of the Presidency from 2001 to 2003. He reached a regional portfolio in 2003, being appointed Regional Minister of the Presidency until the 2004 general election when he was appointed Secretary of State for Defence in the government of José Luis Rodríguez Zapatero and with José Bono first (2004-2006) and José Antonio Alonso later (2006-2007) as Defence Ministers. He resigned in 2007 to run in the 2007 regional elections, being elected MP and Speaker of the regional legislature. He left the office in 2011 and from 2011 to 2012 he was Second Vice President of the legislature.

In 2012, Pardo announced he was leaving politics resigning to his positions as member of parliament and as Provincial Secretary of the Socialist Party in the Province of Albacete.

He returned to politics on June 30, 2018 when the Minister of Home Affairs, Fernando Grande-Marlaska, appointed him as Director-General of the Police. In April 2020, he was admitted to a Madrid hospital after testing positive for COVID-19, thus joining his number two, the Deputy Director of Operations José Ángel González Jiménez, who had tested positive on March 31.
