= Judicial police =

Police who act under a prosecutor

The judicial police, judiciary police, or justice police are (depending on both country and legal system) either a branch, separate police agency or type of duty performed by law enforcement structures in a country. The term judiciary police is mostly a functional title, a role which is assumed by elements of the larger police force who act under direct guidance of the prosecutor. They exist primarily to provide evidence to the prosecutor. They can arrest and interrogate suspects, conduct lineups, question witnesses, and even interrogate non-suspects.

== Types ==
In civil law systems, it is common for judiciary police to be a separate police structure from internal affairs police structure, but they can overlap in duties and competencies.

The most important difference is that the judiciary police typically report to the judicial branch of government or to the justice ministry or department of the executive branch, and "normal" police, such as the gendarmerie, typically report to the ministry of internal affairs of the executive branch. Typical duties performed by the judicial police are administering and securing administration offices of the judicial branch, courts and prisons, providing physical security to judicial officials such as judges, criminal investigators and prosecutors, transportation of defendants and prisoners between courts, jails and law enforcement offices and other duties linked to enforcement of criminal law.

In some cases, the judicial police secure enforcement of non-criminal judicial decisions, such as providing physical security to judicial enforcement officers (ushers or bailiffs), but that is commonly the duty of normal police. It is common for criminal investigation duties, usually under the direction of a prosecutor's office or an examining magistrate, to be performed by the judicial police branch instead of a criminal investigation department within a standard police force, but it does not commonly participate in other forms of law enforcement, such as enforcement of traffic codes.

Civil law judiciary police are, thus, in many ways similar to the institutes of sheriff or marshall in common law countries.

== By country ==
=== France ===
Judicial police are a functional type of police in France that is responsible for the investigation, prosecution, and punishment of criminal offenses.

=== Brazil ===
In Brazil, the duties of the judicial police are the responsibility of the Civil Police of the States and the Federal District and the Federal Police, in accordance with paragraphs 4 and 1 of article 144 of the Constitution.

The function of the Judicial Police dates back to 1619, when the alcaides, carrying out their activities in the towns of the Colony, carried out measures to arrest evildoers, always accompanied by a clerk who would draw up a report of what had happened for later presentation to the magistrate. Later, the figure of the "criminal minister" (ministro criminal or meirinho) emerged, who in his districts mixed the roles of judge and police officer, keeping the peace, carrying out investigations, and ordering the arrest of criminals.

From 1808, with the creation of the Brazilian branch of the Portuguese General Intendancy of the Police of the Court and the State of Brazil in Rio de Janeiro (state) following the model of the Intendência-Geral da Polícia da Corte e do Reino in Portugal,, and the establishment in the same year of the Secretary of Políce (precursor of the current Civil Police of Rio de Janeiro State), followed by the creation of the position of Police Commissioner in 1810, the exercise of the Brazilian judicial police was established in the new police structure.

During the imperial government, it was the delegado (Note: Delegado: member of the police force whose role combines aspects of the roles of a sheriff and a crown prosecutor. The delegado receives the inquérito (written report) at the end of a police investigation. The delegado examines the report and decides whether or not to proceed with a prosecution of the suspect under investigation.) of the Chief of Police who carried out this function, which was retained after the Proclamation of the Republic in 1889, in the Civil Police of the Federal District and in the civil police of the other states of the federation.

As of 1967, the civil police, under the legislation of the military regime, lost their responsibilities related to uniformed ostentatious policing, which they had been carrying out since 1866 through their civil guard corps. This became the responsibility of the state military police and the municipal guards.

Under the terms of article 144, paragraph 4, of the Constitution, "the civil police, led by career delegados, are responsible, except for those under jurisdiction of the Union (Polícia Federal), for the functions of the judicial police and the investigation of criminal offenses, except military ones." They are subordinate to the state governors, through the public security secretariats.

The investigation of criminal offenses is carried out in the course of a police inquiry as provided for in the Code of Criminal Procedure. The Police investigation is conducted independently, exclusively by the delegado, under the terms of Law No. 12.830/2013, which refers it to the appropriate criminal court after its conclusion. The Public Prosecutor's Office may request additional measures to better investigate a case in order to file a criminal action.

== See also ==
- Polícia Judiciária, the main criminal investigation police branch in Portugal
- Federal Judicial Police, former federal police force of Mexico
- Central Directorate of the Judicial Police, France
- Police and Judicial Co-operation in Criminal Matters
- Central Directorate of the Judicial Police and Intelligence
- Judicial officer
