= General Commissariat of Judiciary Police =

Spanish police intelligence service

- Comisaría General de Policía Judicial
- Emblem of the General Commissariat of Judiciary Police

Agency overview
- Formed: November 10, 1958; 67 years ago
- Jurisdiction: Spain
- Headquarters: Madrid, Spain
- Agency executive: Eloy Quirós Álvarez, Commissary-General
- Parent agency: Directorate-General of the Police
- Website: www.policia.es

The General Commissariat of Judiciary Police (Spanish: Comisaría General de Policía Judicial, CGPJ) is an intelligence service within the National Police Corps of Spain responsible for the investigation of organized crime, economic and monetary crimes or cybercrime. CGPJ is also in charge of investigating drug trafficking, gambling control and collecting intelligence for the police corps.

The CGPJ was created in 1958 as General Commissariat of Criminal Investigation (CGIC) and renamed as General Commissariat of Judiciary Police in 1978.

== Units of the CGPJ ==
The units that form the General Commissariat of Judiciary Police are:

=== General Secretariat ===
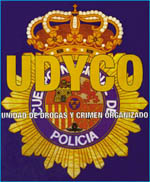

The Secretary-General supports and assists the Commissary-General, analyzes and plans its general lines of action, and manages matters relating to the personnel regime and means attached to it. It is also responsible for the data banks of the General Commissariat.

=== Organized Crime and Drugs Unit ===
The Organized Crime and Drugs Unit (UDYCO) investigates and prosecutes criminal activities related to drug trafficking and organized crime at both national and transnational levels. It also works as the operational coordination and technical support of its territorial units. This unit also contains:

- Central Brigade of Narcotics, which investigates and prosecutes crimes related to the illegal traffic of drugs, according to the legislation on the matter.
- Central Organized Crime Brigade, which investigates and prosecutes criminal activities linked to organized crime. The leadership on the Response Groups against Organized Crime (GRECO) stands out.
- Unit attached to the State Attorney General's Office, which carries out the duties assigned by the Judiciary Police to the body to which it is attached.

=== Unit of Specialized and Violent Delinquency ===
The Unit of Specialized and Violent Delinquency (UDEV) assumes the investigation and prosecution of criminal activities, at national and transnational levels, related to heritage, especially historical and artistic heritage, consumption and environment, criminal offenses in the field of doping in sport, the use of new Technologies, family and children, and crimes against persons and sexual freedom, as well as the operational coordination and technical support of the respective territorial units. From this Unit will depend:

- Brigade of Investigation of the Specialized Delinquency, in charge of the investigation and persecution of the crimes related to the patrimony, the consumption and the environment, the intellectual and industrial property. Of this brigade will depend the Service of Control of Gaming, with the mission of monitoring and inspection of the compliance with the norms on the game and investigation of the crimes that are generated in this area.
- Central Investigation Brigade for Crimes Against Persons, charged with the investigation and prosecution of crimes against life, liberty, homicides, sexual assaults and missing persons; As well as those committed in the family and in the field of minors.
- Historical Heritage Brigade, in charge of the investigation and prosecution of criminal activities related to the historical-artistic heritage.

GRECO Unit emblem

=== Criminal Intelligence Central Unit ===
The Criminal Intelligence Central Unit (UCIC) is responsible for the collection, reception, analysis, treatment and development of information related to criminality, as well as activities in the field of foresight and strategy. UCIC also assume the function of coordinating information of police interest. This Unit and the territorial units of intelligence, on which they are functionally dependent, assume the development of the criminal intelligence function.

=== Unit of Economic and Fiscal Delinquency ===
The Unit of Economic and Fiscal Delinquency (UDEF) assumes the investigation and prosecution of criminal activities, nationally and internationally, in matters of economic and fiscal delinquency, as well as the operational coordination and technical support to the respective Territorial Units. From this Unit will depend:

- Central Brigade of Economic and Fiscal Delinquency, which is responsible for investigating crimes related to Public Treasury, against Social Security, financial fraud, stock offenses and scams of special importance.
- Central Anti-corruption and Money Laundering Research Brigade, which is responsible for investigating crimes related to money laundering arising from criminal acts, international piracy, corruption in various forms and recovery of assets.
- Central Brigade of Economic Intelligence, which is responsible for investigating criminal offenses related to activities subject to control, surveillance or inspection of the bodies responsible for the prevention of money laundering.
- Brigade of Investigation of the Bank of Spain, which assumes the investigation of the crimes related to the falsification of national and foreign currency.
- Unit attached to the Office of the Special Prosecutor against Corruption and Organized Crime, which will carry out the duties of the Judiciary Police in the attached body.

=== Technological Research Unit ===
The Technological Research Unit (UIT) assumes the investigation and prosecution of criminal activities that involve the use of ICT and cybercrime at national and transnational level. This unit will depend on:

- Central Brigade of Technological Investigation, corresponding to the investigation of criminal activities related to the protection of minors, privacy, intellectual and industrial property and telecommunications fraud.
- Central Computer Security Brigade, which is responsible for investigating criminal activities that affect logical security and fraud.

== See also ==
- National Police Corps
- Civil Guard
