= Ricardo Peralta Ortega =

Spanish politician (born 1951)

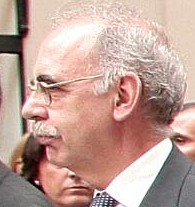
Ricardo Peralta Ortega

Ricardo Peralta Ortega (1951 in Belvis de la Jara, Toledo, Spain), is a Spanish politician and former member of the Spanish Parliament.

Married, with two children, he qualified as a Lawyer specialising in Labour Law. He became a member of the Communist Party of Spain (PCE) in 1972. In 1986 the PCE joined with other left-wing parties to form the coalition United Left (IU) and in 1989 he was elected to the Spanish Congress representing Valencia Province and was re-elected in 1993 and 1996. In September 1997, following internal divisions, he left IU and joined the newly created New Left Democratic Party (Partido Democratico de la Nueva Izquierda). In 1999 he was part of the strand of that party which broke away and merged with the Spanish Socialist Workers' Party (PSOE) which Peralta then joined. He did not stand at the 2000 election.

In May 2008, after an absence from front line politics, he was named as the Central Government's delegate in the Valencian Community.
