= National Police Corps (Spain) =

National civilian police force of Spain

National Police Corps Cuerpo Nacional de Policía
- Seal of the National Police Corps of Spain

- Badge of the National Police Corps of Spain

- Flag of the National Police Corps of Spain
- Common name: Policía Nacional
- Abbreviation: CNP
- Motto: "Servicio, Dignidad, Entrega, Lealtad" "Service, Dignity, Dedication, Loyalty"

Agency overview
- Formed: January 8, 1824 (as General Police of the Kingdom); 4 December 1978 (formation of current service); 13 March 1986 (current law)
- Preceding agencies: Cuerpo Superior de Policía; Cuerpo de Policía Armada
- Employees: Around 76,000 in active service (2026)
- Annual budget: €3.96 billion, 2026

Jurisdictional structure
- National agency (Operations jurisdiction): Spain
- Operations jurisdiction: Spain
- Population: 47,435,597
- Legal jurisdiction: As per operations jurisdiction
- Governing body: Government of Spain
- Constituting instruments: Spanish Constitution of 1978; Organic Act 2/1986
- General nature: Civilian police

Operational structure
- Overseen by: Directorate-General of the Police
- Headquarters: Calle Miguel Ángel, 5, 28039 Madrid, Community of Madrid, Spain
- Minister responsible: Fernando Grande-Marlaska
- Agency executives: Francisco Pardo Piqueras, Director-General; José Luis Santafé Arnedo, Deputy Director of Operations

Notables
- Anniversary: October 2
- Award: Order of Police Merit

Website
- www.policia.es

The National Police Corps (Spanish: Cuerpo Nacional de Policía, CNP; [ˈkweɾpo naθjoˈnal de poliˈθi.a]; also known simply as the National Police, Policía Nacional) is the national civilian police force of Spain. The CNP is mainly responsible for policing urban areas, whilst rural policing is generally the responsibility of the Civil Guard, the Spanish national gendarmerie force. The CNP operates under the authority of Spain's Ministry of the Interior. They mostly handle public safety, criminal investigation, judicial, terrorism and immigration matters, having also the exclusive responsibility for national ID cards and passports. The powers of the National Police Corps varies according to the autonomous community. For example, the Ertzaintza and the Mossos d'Esquadra are the primary police agencies in the Basque Country and Catalonia, respectively. In Navarre and Canary Islands, they share some duties jointly with Policía Foral (Foruzaingoa) and Policia Canaria.

It has its own emergency number, 091, which is the hallmark of the National Police and was the first emergency number to be used in Spain, in Madrid in 1958.

== History ==
The 1986 organic law unifying the separate uniformed and plainclothes branches of the national police was a major reform that required a considerable period of time to be brought into full effect. The former plainclothes service, known as the Superior Police Corps (Cuerpo Superior de Policía), but often referred to as the "secret police", formerly the General Police Corps (Cuerpo General de Policía), consisted of some 9,000 officers. Prior to 1986, it had a supervisory and coordinating role in police operations, conducted domestic surveillance, collected intelligence, investigated major crimes, issued identity documents, and carried out liaison with foreign police forces.

The uniformed service, the Armed Police Corps (Cuerpo de Policía Armada) which became the basis of the current National Police in 1978, was a completely separate organization with a complement of about 50,000 officers, including a small number of female recruits who were first accepted for training in 1984. The Director General of the National Police Corps, a senior official of the Ministry of Interior, commanded 13 regional headquarters, 50 provincial offices, and about 190 municipal police stations. In the nine largest cities, several district police stations served separate sections of the city. The chief of police of each station was in command of both the uniformed and the plainclothes officers attached to the station. A centrally controlled Special Operations Group (Grupo Especial de Operaciones—GEO) was an elite fighting unit trained to deal with terrorist and hostage situations.

The principal weapons regularly used by the uniformed police were 9mm pistols, 9mm submachine guns, CETME and NATO 7.62mm rifles, and various forms of riot equipment. Their original uniform consisted of light brown trousers and dark brown jackets.

The initial training phase for recruits to the National Police Corps was nine months, followed by a year of practical training. Promotions to corporal, sergeant, and sergeant major were based on seniority, additional training, and performance. In the Franco era, most police officers were seconded from the Spanish Army (with some from the Civil Guard). Under a 1978 law, future police officers were to receive separate training, and army officers detailed to the police were to be permanently transferred. By 1986 only 170 army officers remained in the National Police Corps. Under the 1986 organic law, military-type training for police was to be terminated, and all candidate officers were to attend the Higher Police School at Ávila, which previously had served as the three-year training center for the Superior Police Corps. The ranks of the plainclothes corps—commissioners, subcommissioners, and inspectors of first, second, and third class—were to be assimilated into the ranking system of the uniformed police—colonel, lieutenant colonel, major, captain, and lieutenant. Two lower categories—subinspection and basic—would include all nonofficer uniformed personnel. The newly unified National Police Corps was to be responsible for issuing identity cards and passports, as well as for immigration and deportation controls, refugees, extradition, deportation, gambling controls, drugs, and supervision of private security forces.

Franco's Policía Armada had once been dreaded as one of the most familiar symbols of the regime's oppressiveness. During the 1980s, however, the police underwent an internal transformation process, being brought to adopt the new democratic spirit of the times. The police supported the legally constituted government during the 1981 coup attempt. Led by the new police trade union, the police demonstrated in 1985 against right-wing militants in their ranks and cooperated in efforts to punish misconduct and abuses of civil rights by individual officers.

The current sidearm is the Heckler & Koch USP Compact 9×19mm.

== Duties ==
Law enforcement duties in Spain are regulated by the Organic law 2/1986 of March 13, 1986, making a distinction between the generic functions of all police forces and the exclusive duties that the law assigns to the national police, being those:

1. The issuing of identity documents (e.g., national ID cards and passports).
2. To control the arrival and departure of foreign and Spanish citizens.
3. Immigration law, refuge and asylum, extradition and expulsion.
4. Gambling enforcement.
5. Drug enforcement.
6. Collaboration with Interpol and Europol.
7. Control of private security companies.
8. General law enforcement and criminal investigation.

== Access and training ==
=== Requirements ===
- Be born or a naturalized Spanish citizen
- Be over 18 years of age.
- Be at least 1.65 metres (5 ft 5 in) tall, for men, and 1.60 metres (5 ft 3 in) for women
- Not have been convicted of fraud or dismissed by a local, regional or national government, or prevented from holding public functions.
- Hold a driving licence of the class specified by the government.

Basic Scale:

- Have or to be in conditions to obtain the Certificate of Bachillerato or equivalent.

Executive Scale:

- Have a Technical Engineer, Technical Architect, Qualified University student or equivalent or top formation degree.

=== Competitive examination ===
The applicant can choose between a Basic Scale career or an Executive Scale career. Applicants must pass the following basic tests before starting the academy:

- Physical test
- Multiple-choice exam
- Aptitude test
- Voluntary language test (English or French)
- Medical examination
- Interview

=== Training academy ===
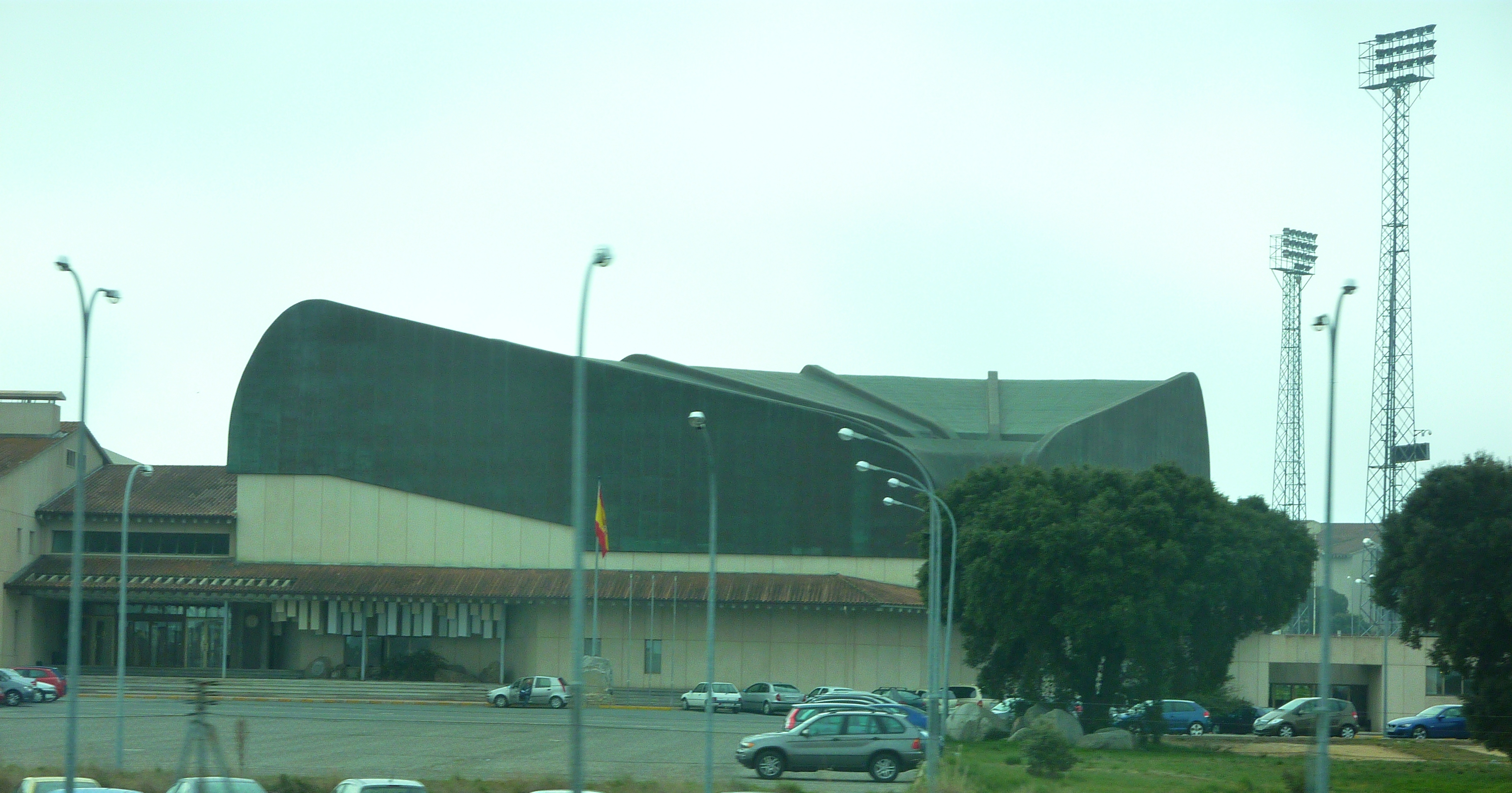
Ávila Police Academy

If the applicant has been chosen, they will receive professional training at the police academy in Ávila for nine months. Whilst trainees reside at the academy, they learn about Spanish law, receive firearms and self-defense training, conduct practical application exercises, learn the basics of the English or French languages and undergo training in crime investigation. Finally, the pupil will receive a policing practice for a year, in which there will be various common situations that will form him as an agent.

== Ranks ==
Spanish Policia Nacional wordmark (as seen on uniforms and vehicles).

From 1979 to 1986 the Police sported a military rank system, a holdover of the old Armed Police.

Above the cadet ranks (there are five cadet ranks), the current ranks are:

- Policía – Policeman/policewoman
- Oficial de Policía – Police Officer
- Subinspector – Sub-inspector
- Inspector – Inspector
- Inspector Jefe – Chief Inspector
- Comisario – Commissioner
- Comisario Principal – Principal Commissioner
- Jefe Superior – Superior Chief
- Comisario General – Commissioner General, and Jefe de División – Divisional Chief [equal ranks]
- Subdirector General – Sub-Director General
- Director Adjunto Operativo – Assistant Director of Operations
- Director General de la Policía – Director-General of Police

=== Rank insignia ===
Categories	Superior Grades				Superior		Executive		Deputy Inspector	Basic		Student
Spain
Spain	Director Adjunto Operativo (DAO)	Subdirector General	Comisario General/Jefe de División	Jefe Superior	Comisario Principal	Comisario	Inspector Jefe	Inspector	Subinspector	Oficial de Policía	Policía	Inspector Alumno en Prácticas	Inspector Alumno de 2º año	Inspector Alumno de 1º año	Policía en Prácticas	Policía Alumno

=== Rank insignia 1986–2014 ===
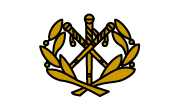
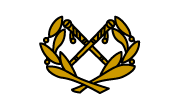
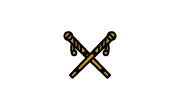
Categories	Superior Grades			Superior		Executive		Deputy Inspector	Basic		Student
Spain
Spain	DAO/Subdirector General	Comisario General/Jefe de División	Jefe Superior	Comisario Principal	Comisario	Inspector Jefe	Inspector	Subinspector	Oficial de Policía	Policía	Inspector Alumno de 2º año	Inspector Alumno de 1º año	Policía en Prácticas

Superior

Executive

Deputy Inspector

Basic

== Uniforms ==
CNP Uniforms
Service uniform SC	riot police UPR	riot police UIP	Tactical unit GOES	Tactical unit GEO	Bomb disposal TEDAX	Dress uniform	Dress uniform	Dress uniform (female)

CNP Uniforms 1989–2009
Service uniform	Service uniform	UIP/UPR	UIP 2000–2014	GOES 1990–1995

== Organization and operational police functions ==
The General Directorate of Police (DGP) of Spain is the governing body of the Ministry of the Interior, attached to the Secretary of State for Security, which is responsible for exercising direct command of the National Police Corps, as well as the organization, direction, coordination and execution of the missions entrusted to the National Police by current provisions, in accordance with the guidelines and orders issued by the Minister of the Interior.

In general, the National Police is divided into different areas of action for the exercise of its functions, both at the central level (for all of Spain) and at the territorial level, replicating this division of powers in all territorial dependencies, adapting each one to the corresponding scale. These are called operational police functions.

All different forms of organization, whether at the central or territorial level, follow this division of operational police functions, being divided into these 5 areas:

- Public Safety (Seguridad Ciudadana) – general law enforcement and public security functions, specially with patrol cars and with special units (K-9 unit, riot control unit, etc).
- Judiciary or Criminal Investigation Police (Policía Judicial) – crime investigation and judicial cooperation.
- Scientific or ForensicPolice (Policía Científica) – crime scenes units and preparation of expert reports for the judicial authority.
- Intelligence or Information (Información) – intelligence and anti-terrorism and radicalization unit, having always under his direction:
  - TEDAX-NRBQ (Servicio de Desactivación de Explosivos y Nuclear, Radiológico, Bacteriológico y Químico) – Explosive Ordinance Disposal (EOD) and CRBN (Chemical, Radiological, Biological, and Nuclear) specialised team.
- Immigration and Borders (Extranjería y Fronteras) – Control of foreigners and entry and exit from Spain, as well as issuance of documentation.

=== Central Structure ===
The National Police Corps depends on the General Directorate of Police (DGP) of Spain and is composed at the central level of:

- The Deputy Directorate of Operations (DAO), responsible for collaborating with the Director General in managing public order and citizen security functions, and for the direction, coordination, and supervision of central, supraterritorial, and territorial units; for monitoring and controlling the results of operational programs; for defining the human and material resources applicable to these programs; and for strategic planning regarding digital transformation. The DAO is also responsible for the operational police functions at a central level, being these:
  - The General Commissariat of Information
  - The General Commissariat of Judiciary Police
  - The General Commissariat of Public Safety
  - The General Commissariat of Immigration and Borders
  - The General Commissariat of Forensic Police.
- The DAO also has under his orders the following units:
  - The Operations and Digital Transformation Division.
  - The Strategic Planning and Coordination Unit.
  - The Special Operations Group (GEO)
  - The Internal Affairs Unit.
  - The Operational Support Brigade.
- The Subdirectorate General of Human Resources and Training, responsible for collaborating with the Director General in the direction and coordination of the management of DGP personnel, as well as their selection and training. It is divide into:
  - The General Secretariat.
  - The Human Resources Planning Unit.
  - The Occupational Risk Prevention and Social and Health Protection Unit.
  - The Personnel Division.
  - The Training and Development Division.
- The Subdirectorate General of Logistics and Innovation, responsible for collaborating with the Director General in the direction, coordination, administration, and management of financial and material resources, as well as documentation on Spanish and foreign nationals, and police archives. It is divided into:
  - The General Secretariat.
  - The Information Technology and Telecommunications Unit.
  - The Economic and Technical Division.
  - The Documentation Division.
- The International Cooperation Division, which is responsible for managing the Interpol National Central Bureau, the Europol National Unit, and the SIRENE Office, directing collaboration and assistance with police forces in other countries, and coordinating working groups in which the Directorate General of Police participates within the European Union and other international institutions, as well as aspects related to support missions to third countries and police personnel serving abroad. It is organised:
  - The General Secretariat.
  - The International Coordination Unit.
  - The Interpol National Central Bureau.
  - The Europol National Unit.
  - The SIRENE Office.
- The Technical Office, which is responsible for providing support and assistance to the Director General.

=== Territorial Structure ===
The territorial organization, hierarchically divided, will consist of:

- Regional Police Headquarters (Jefatura Superior de Policía), there is one in each autonomous community and in Ceuta and Melilla, except in Andalucía, that is divided into 2 of these. They are based in the capital of the autonomous community but not always.
- Provincial Police Headquarters (Comisaría Provincial), there is one in each spanish province, based in the provincial capital always.
- Local Police Stations (Comisaría local), existing only in those cities that are not the provincial capital and the Ministry of the Interior determines, generally being large urban areas but also in some smaller areas that, in principle, would correspond to the Guardia Civil.
- Zonal Police Headquarters (Comisaría Zonal), there are only few of these in large urban areas that are divided into districts, being responsible for their district o precinct police stations.
- District or Precinct Police Stations (Comisarías de Distrito), they exist only in the largest cities that, due to needs, are divided into smaller areas to respond, like in Madrid.

If there is a local police station, it is normally never divided into zonal or district police stations as they are smaller in size than the provincial ones, that are those that are divide into zonal and district police stations.

Apart from the territorial organization mentioned above, there are other different territorial units created only for specific functions:

- Police and Customs Cooperation Centers (Centros de Cooperación Policial y Aduanera), created by Spain on its borders, with Portugal and France, for the exchange of information and support of cross-border police and customs operations. These centers are a tool for preventing and suppressing crimes, improving police cooperation, and facilitating border control within the framework of the European Union.
- Police Cooperation Centers (Centros de Cooperación Policial), created by Spain with Morocco for the same functions as the Police and Customs Cooperation Centers but without customs cooperation.
- Border Posts (Puestos fronterizos), they exist in specific places on spanish borders to control entrance/exit from Spanish territory.They are normal border posts, different from the ones above.
- Immigration Units (Unidades de Extranjería), they exist for carrying out administrative procedures for foreigners.
- Documentation Units (Unidades de Documentación), they exist for carrying out issuance and obtaining of national ID and passport, only for Spaniards.

== Special units ==
- GOES (Grupos Operativos Especiales de Seguridad) – police tactical units.
- GEO (Grupo Especial de Operaciones) – elite police tactical unit, equivalent to GSG-9 or FBI HRT.
- UIP (Unidad de Intervención Policial) – Anti-riot unit.
- UPR (Unidad de Prevención y Reacción) – Anti-riot unit.
- UDYCO (Unidad de Drogas Y Crimen Organizado) – Drugs and organised crime investigation squad.
- UDEV (Unidad de Delincuencia Especializada y Violenta) – Investigation and pursuit several kinds of crimes like kidnapping, extortion, homicide and those related to artistic and cultural heritage and families.
- BIT (Brigada de Investigación Tecnológica) – Computer crime unit.
- UDEF (Unidad de Delincuencia Económica y Fiscal) – Financial crimes.
- UEGC (Unidad Especial de Guías Caninos) – Canine unit. Drug, explosives, money bills and people detection.
- SMA (Servicios de Medios Aéreos) – police helicopters, planes and drones unit.
- USPA (Unidad de Subsuelo y Protección Ambiental) – specialized in subsoil and sewerage security.
- GOIT (Grupo Operativo de Intervenciones Técnicas) – specialized in openings and accesses with technical difficulties.
- GOR (Grupo Operativo de Respuesta).
- GAC (Grupo de Atención al Ciudadano)
- Unidad Canina – Canine unit

== Gallery ==
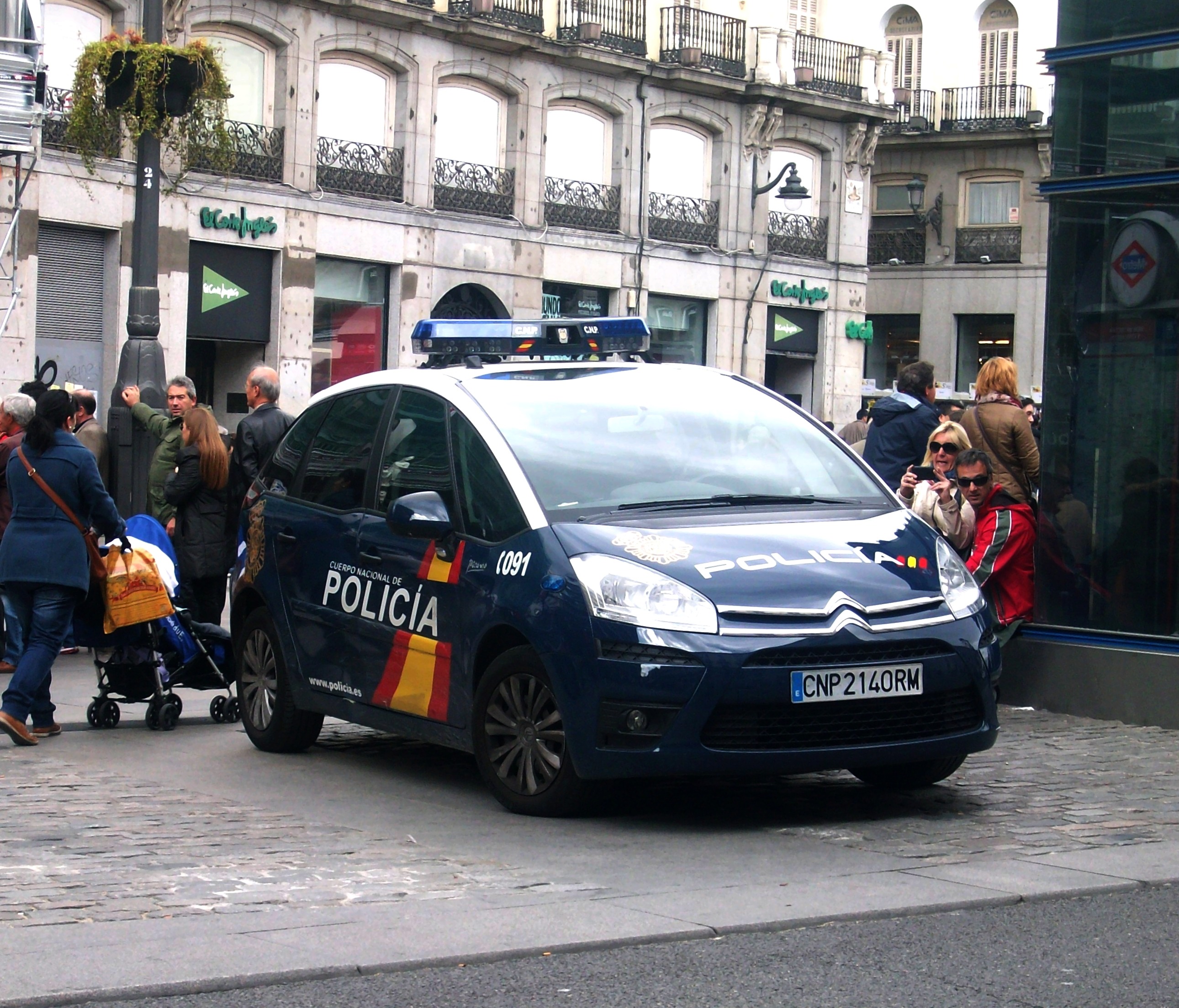
Citroën C4 Picasso

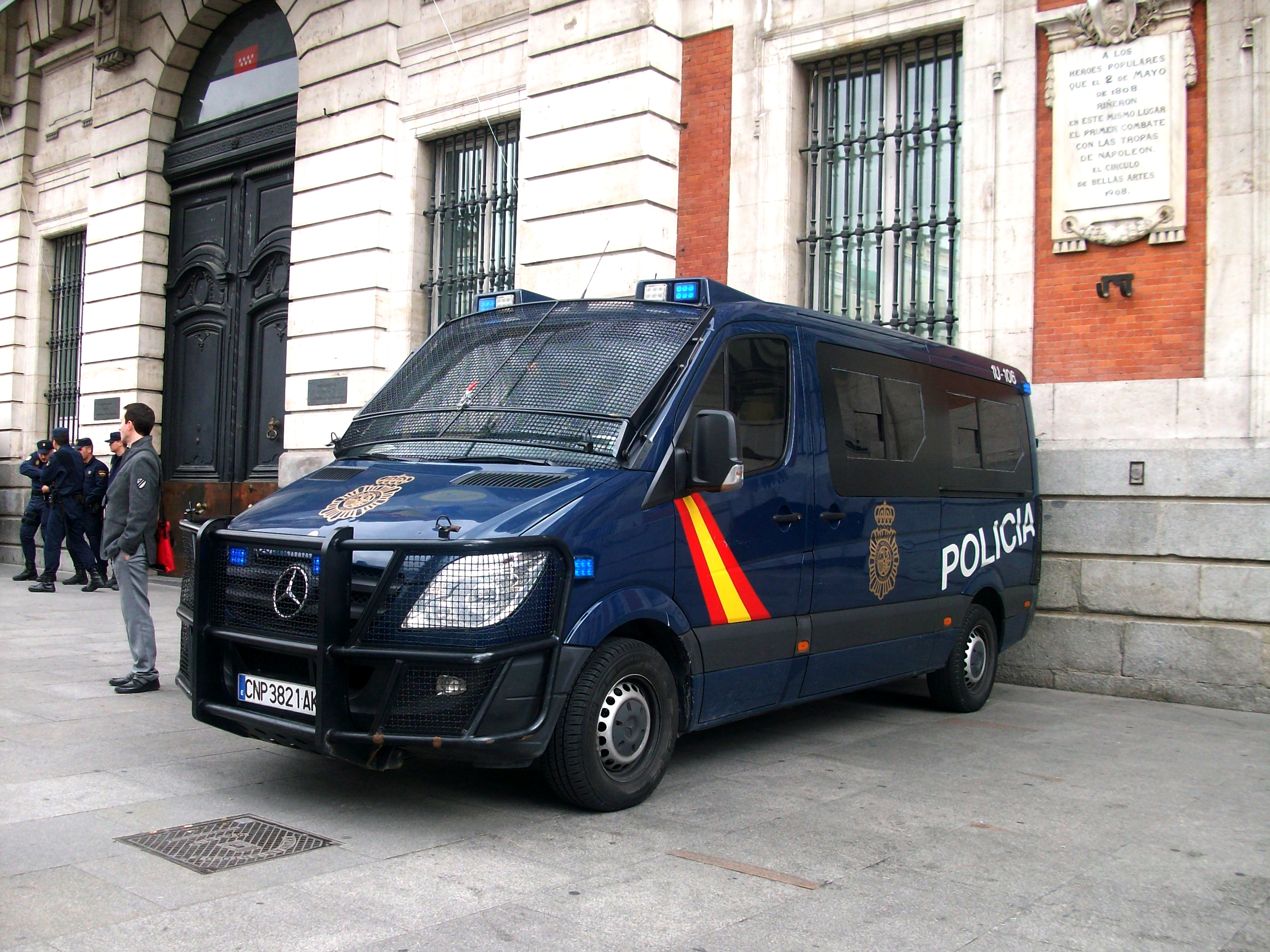
Mercedes-Benz Sprinter

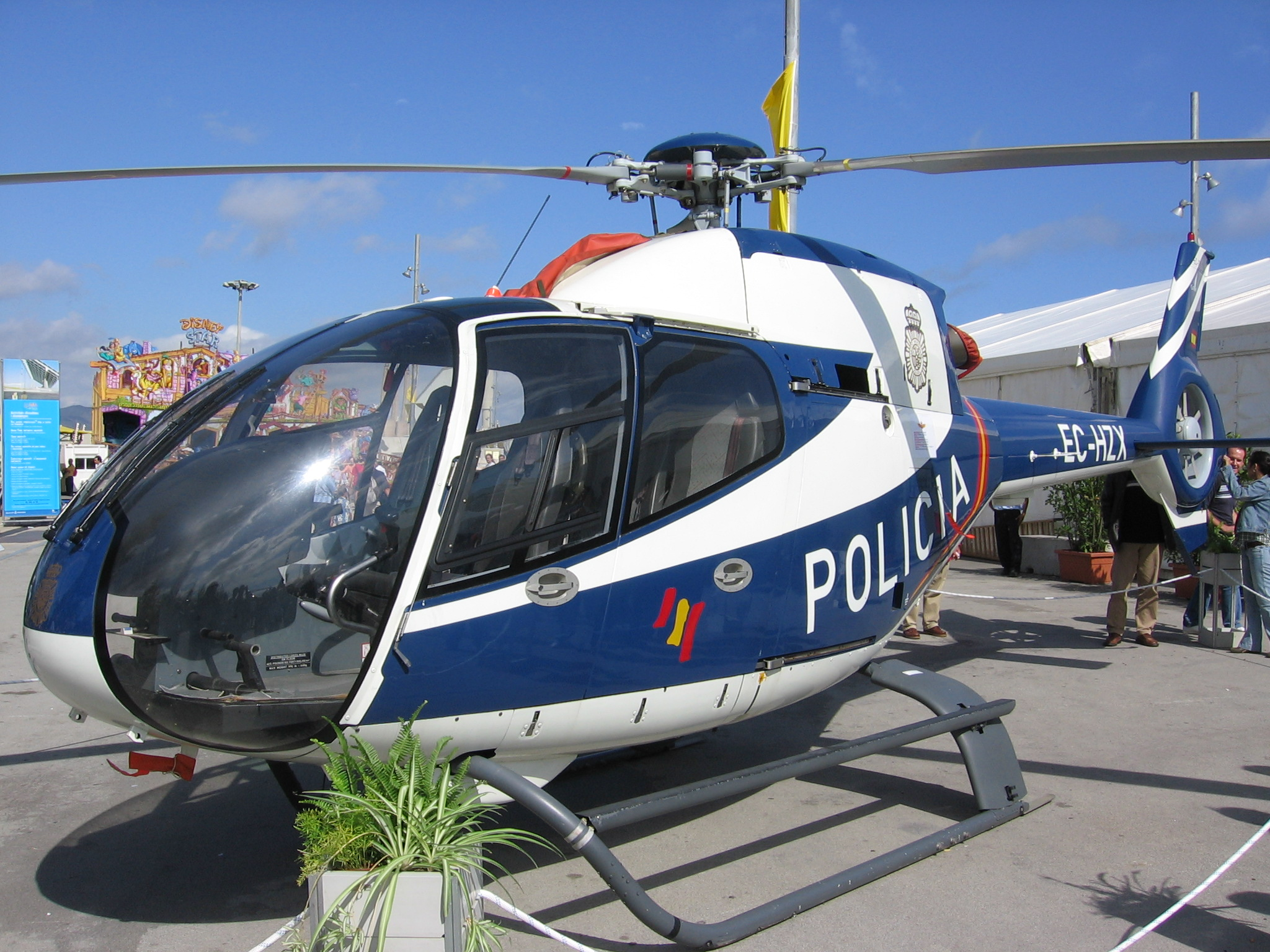
Eurocopter EC120

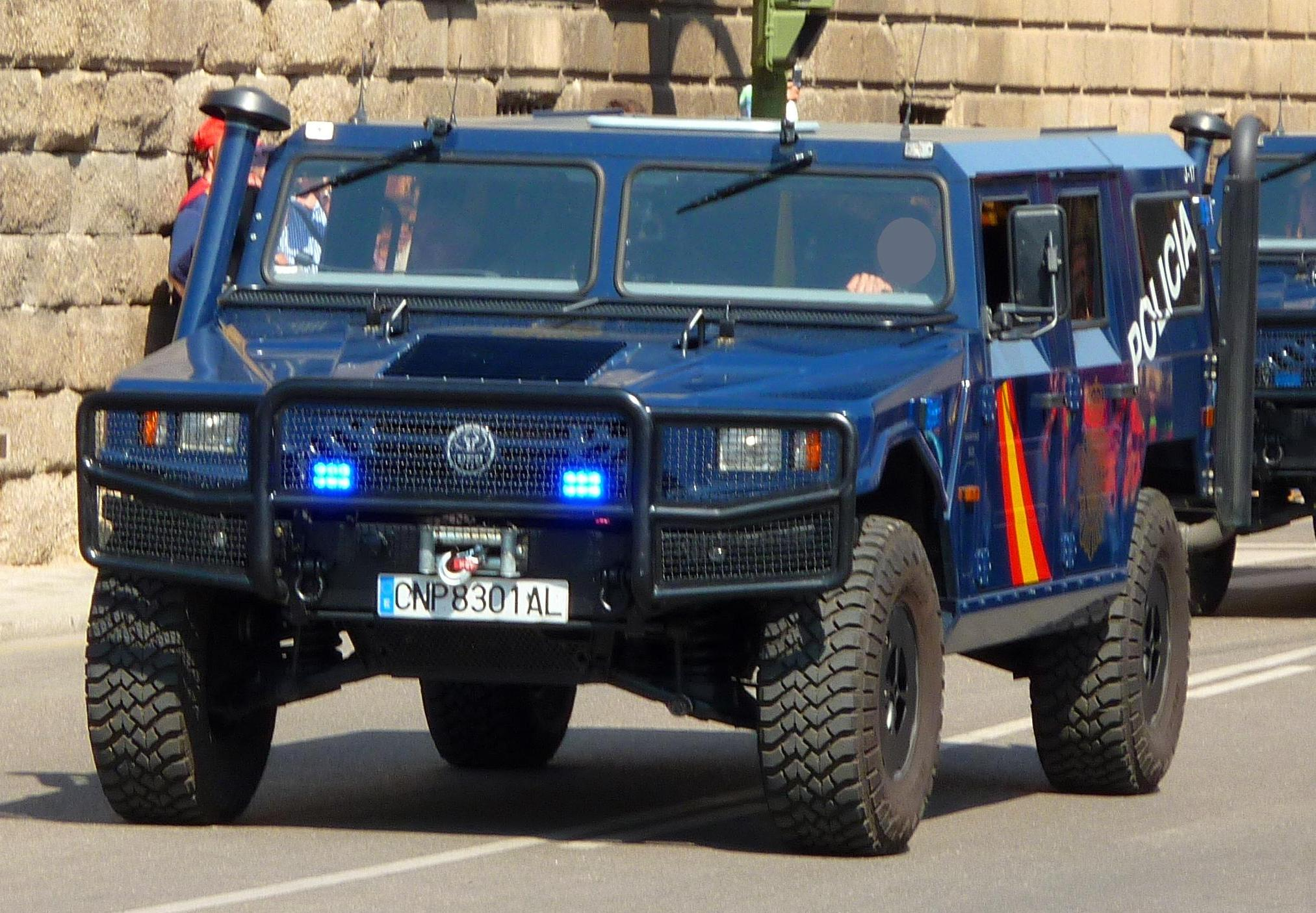
VAMTAC

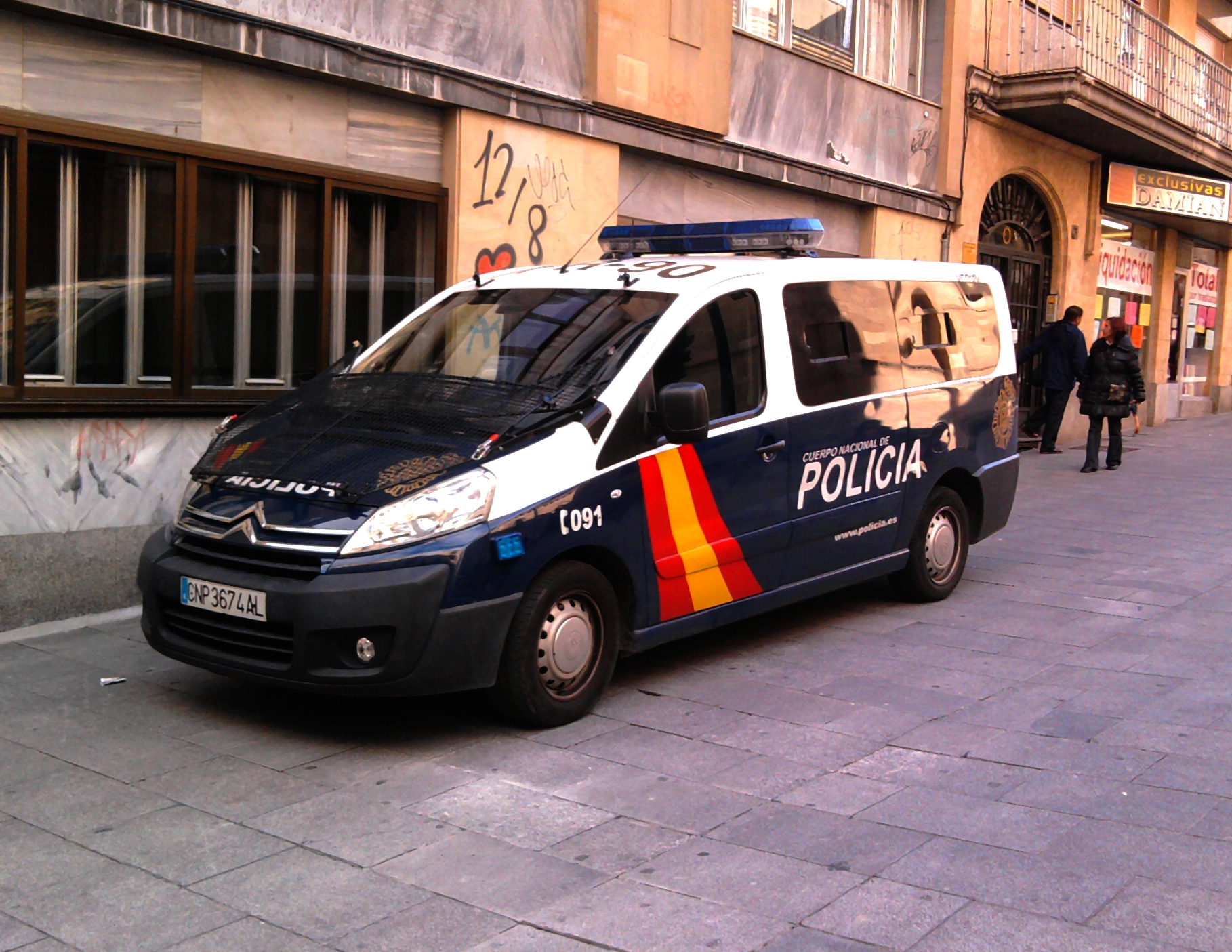
Citroën Jumpy

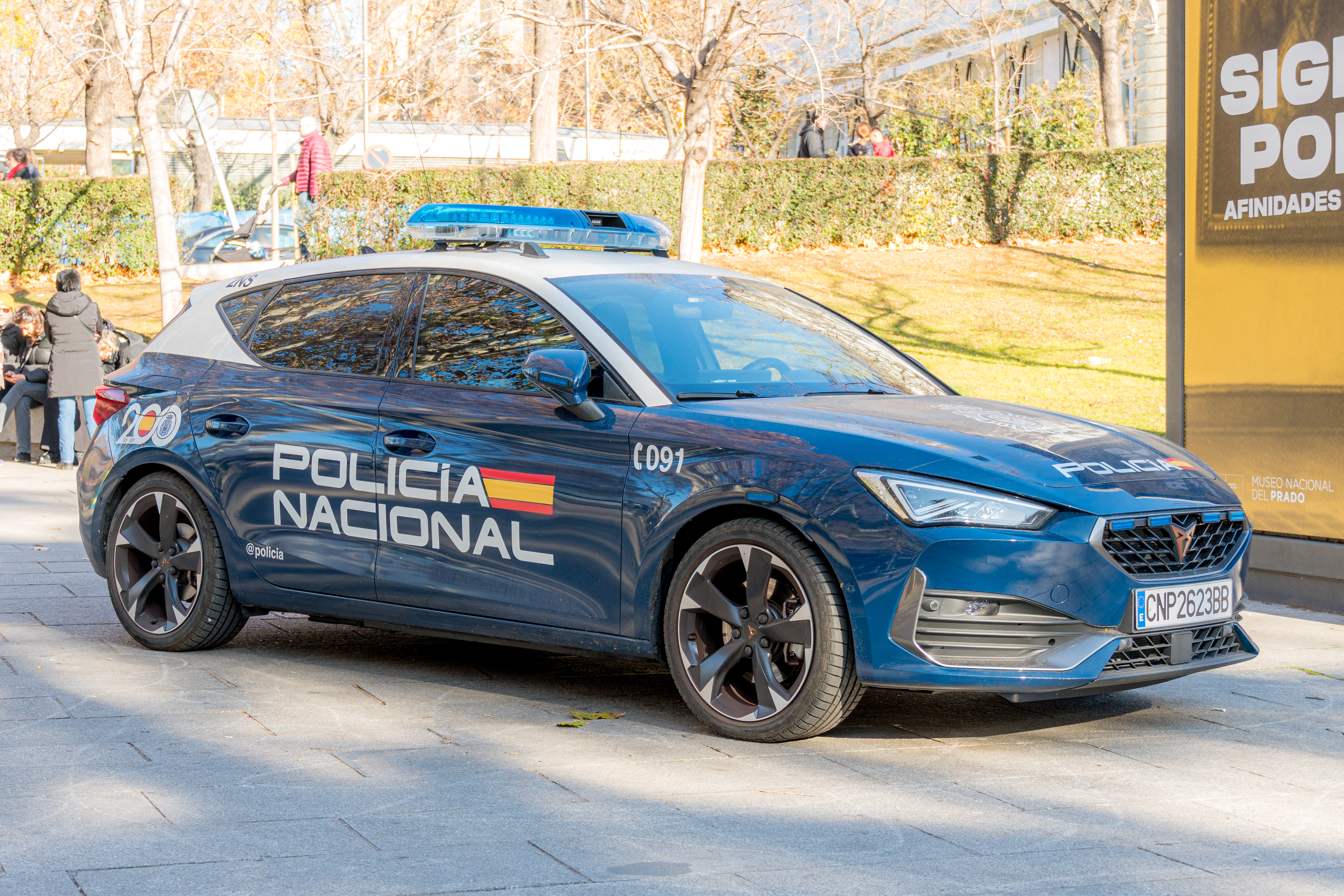
Cupra León

== See also ==
- Law enforcement in Spain
- Crime in Spain
