= General Serrador Bridge =

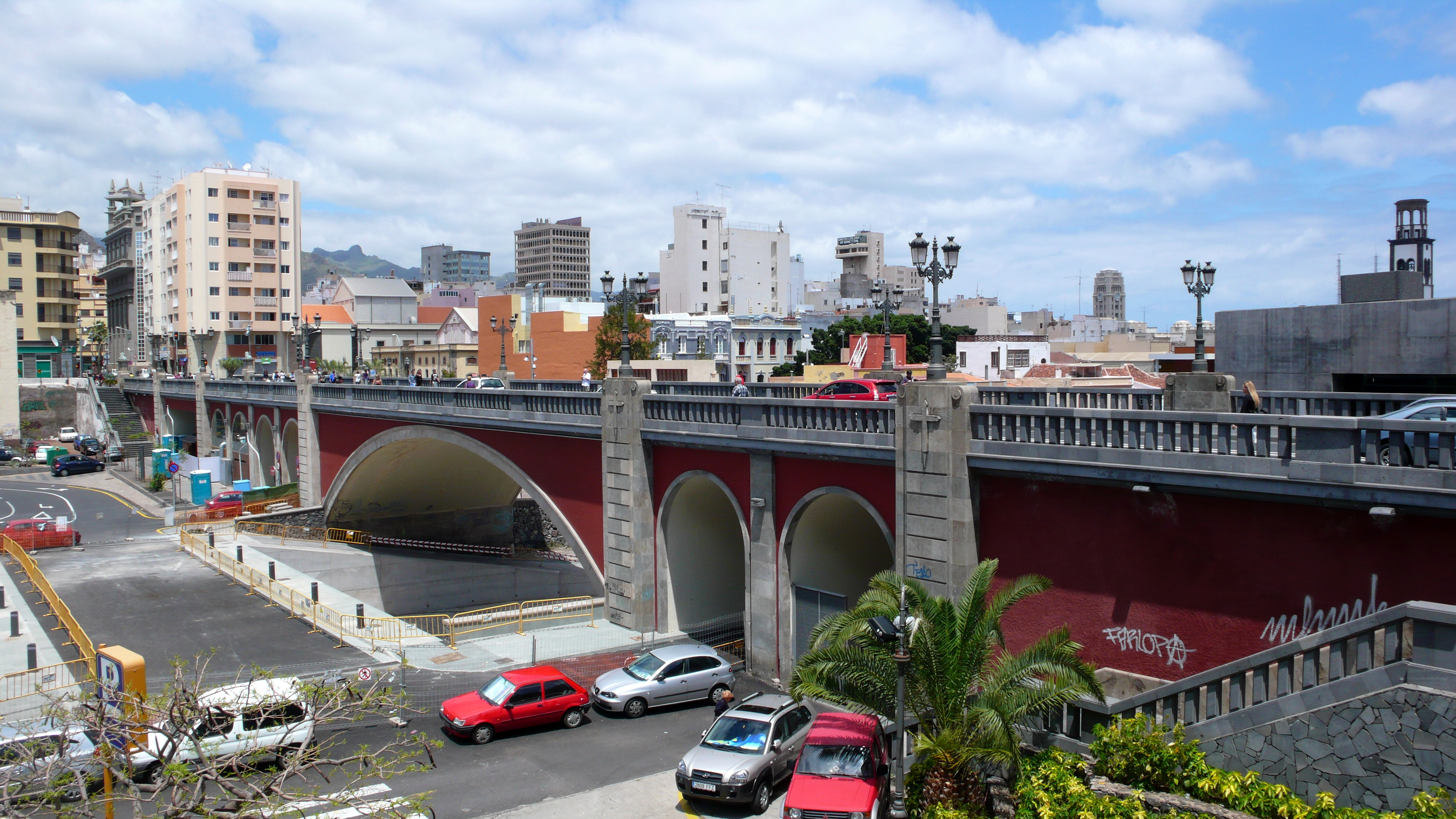
- The bridge in 2009
- Coordinates: 28°27′53″N 16°15′06″W
- Locale: Santa Cruz de Tenerife

History
- Designer: José Blasco Robles
- Opened: 1943
- Rebuilt: 2004

General Serrador Bridge (Spanish: Puente General Serrador) is a bridge across the Barranco de Santos in Santa Cruz de Tenerife, Tenerife, Spain.

== History ==
The bridge was designed in 1942, and was ordered by the Captain General of the Canary Islands, Ricardo Serrador Santés. Serrador died in 1943, and the bridge was named after him after it was completed under his successor, Francisco García-Escámez. Construction by Entrecanales y Távora started on 5 August 1942, and was formally completed on 3 January 1944, after the bridge's opening in 1943. The bridge was designed by José Blasco Robles.

It was renovated in 2004, at the cost of €1.7 million, but by 2010 it was starting to decay again, with cracks in tiles caused by oxidised metal nails.

== Structure ==
The bridge is 13 metres (43 ft) wide, carrying a two-lane road, pavements, and parking. It has a central arch over the ravine that is around 30 metres (98 ft) in length. It has light granite verticals, with reinforced concrete railings, and precast moldings. There are two access viaducts on one side of the central arch, and four on the other, both with closed masonry walls. There are matching 3 metres (9.8 ft) wide staircases on each end of the bridge that connect the top to the bottom level. It has two bronze lions on each side, which were replaced during repair works in 2016, when parking on the bridge was also blocked by pylons to prevent parking on the bridge, and a new basaltic stone balustrade.
