= Barranco de Santos =

Coordinates: 28.4680°N 16.2647°W

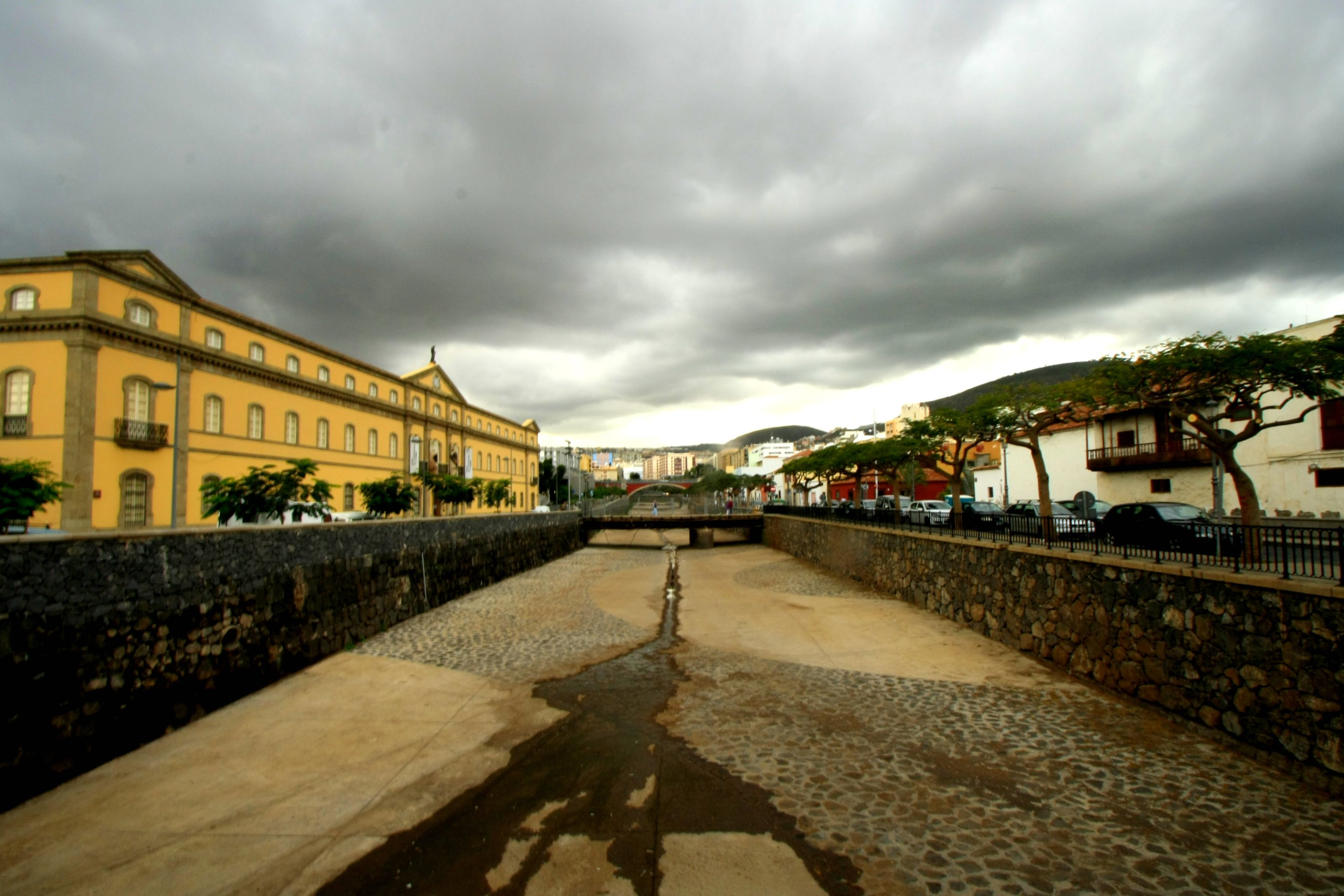
Barranco de Santos 2010

Barranco de Santos is a ravine in Tenerife, Spain.

== Bridges ==
The ravine is crossed by a number of bridges, including:

- Galcerán Bridge, opened in 1928.
- General Serrador Bridge, opened in 1943.
