= Galcerán Bridge =

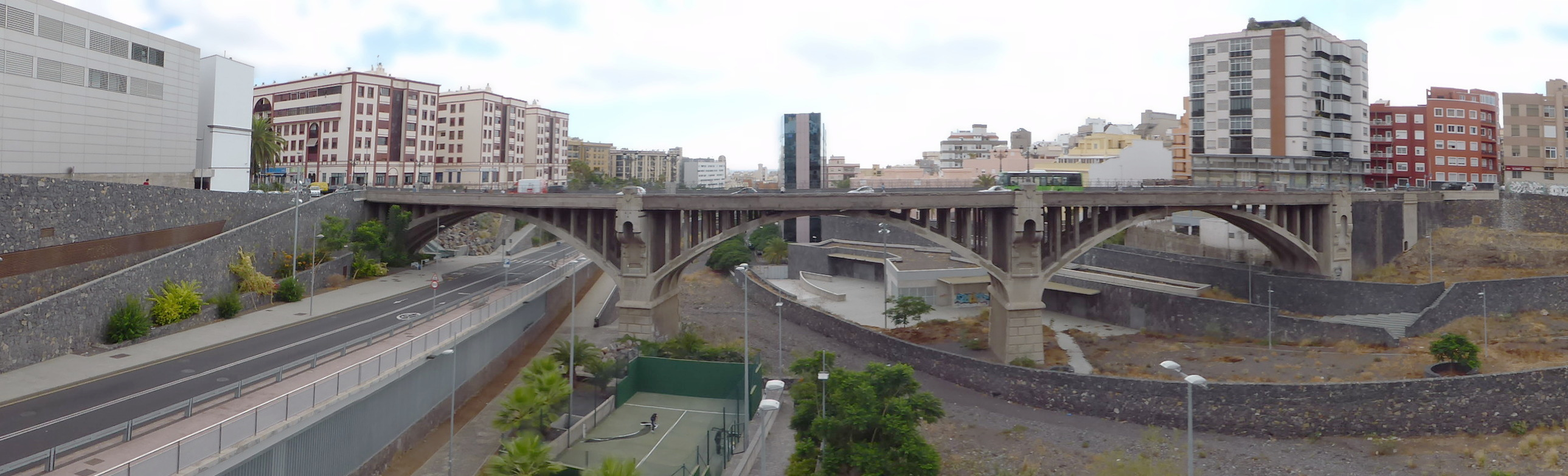
- The bridge in 2013
- Coordinates: 28°27′53″N 16°15′23″W
- Crosses: Barranco de Santos
- Locale: Santa Cruz de Tenerife, Tenerife, Spain

Characteristics
- Total length: 150 metres (490 ft)
- Height: 20 metres (66 ft)

History
- Architect: Antonio Pintor
- Engineering design by: Eduardo Torroja
- Constructed by: Construcciones Hidráulicas y Civiles SA
- Construction start: 7 June 1926; 98 years ago
- Construction cost: 638,438 peseta (bridge); 3,750 peseta (street light); 1,700,000 euro (renovation, 2018)
- Opened: 19 October 1928; 96 years ago
- Rebuilt: 2018; 7 years ago

Galcerán Bridge (Spanish: Puente Galcerán) is a bridge in Santa Cruz de Tenerife, Tenerife, Canary Islands, Spain. Conceived in 1904, it was constructed between 1926 and 1928, and officially opened on 19 October 1928 during a visit of Miguel Primo de Rivera to Tenerife. It was the third bridge to span the Barranco de Santos. It was refurbished in 2018.

== History ==
The bridge was conceived in 1904 by engineer Gudalfajaro, and it was constructed using a loan taken out by the Santa Cruz government when Santiago García Sanabria was mayor. The bridge was designed by architect Antonio Pintor and engineer Eduardo Torroja.

Acquisition of land for the bridge began in February 1926. At the time it belonged to Mr Cejas and Mr Montesdeoca, and was purchased for 10 pesetas per square metre. There was a controversy that the construction of the bridge could affect the newly built Estadio Heliodoro Rodríguez López.

Construction started on 7 June 1926. It was built by Construcciones Hidráulicas y Civiles SA at the cost of 638,438 pesetas. The 10 streetlights installed on it were bought from Seville at the cost of 3,750 pesetas. During construction, worker Benito Martín González died when he fell from the arches to the bottom of the ravine; there were also other accidents during construction.

The official opening was at 5 p.m. on 19 October 1928, as part of the visit of Prime Minister Miguel Primo de Rivera to Tenerife. When it opened, it was the third bridge to cross the Santos ravine. Its construction enabled the creation of the Los Molinos and La Salle neighbourhoods.

== Structure ==
The bridge is 150 metres (490 ft) long and 20 metres (66 ft) tall. While it originally had 1-metre-tall (3.3 ft) railings, these were replaced in 1954 with 0.9-metre-tall (3.0 ft) railings atop a parapet to limit the number of suicides from the bridge.

It was renovated in 2018. Work started in April 2018 and lasted five months, costing €1.7 million. The preventative work included improving and reinforcing the bridge structure and cladding. Historical information panels were also installed under the lamp posts.
