= Armorial of the Spanish Armed Forces =

Spanish military units have coats of arms, badges and emblems to distinguish them from other units both joint Armed Forces and service branches units.

The first evidence of medieval coats of arms is found in the Bayeux Tapestry from the 11th century, where some of the combatants carry shields painted with crosses. Coats of arms came into general use by feudal lords and knights in battle in the 12th century. By the 13th century arms had spread beyond their initial battlefield use to become a kind of flag or logo for families in the higher social classes of Europe. The use of arms spread to Church clergy, and to towns as civic identifiers, and to royally-chartered organizations such as universities and trading companies. In the 21st century, coats of arms are still in use by a variety of institutions and individuals. Military coats of arms and emblems were first required in navies and air forces to recognize naval fleets and squadrons. Nowadays Spanish military insignia are used for official wear or display by military personnel and Armed Forces units and organizations, including branches, commands, cops, brigades, divisions, regiments, battalions, centres et cetera.

Vicente de Cadenas y Vicent (1915–2005), Chronicler King of Arms of Spain, said military objects and natural figures are the most common heraldic charges used in Spanish Armed Forces heraldry. Chimeric figures are also used but they are uncommon. Mister Cadenas y Vicent also noted there are too many wrongly located charges in Spanish military escutcheons.

Emblem of the Spanish Armed Forces (FAS)
Coat of Arms of the Joint Forces General Staff of the Armed Forces (EMAD)

Emblem of the Directorate-General of Weaponry and Equipment (DGAM)
Ministry of Defence

Emblem of the Directorate-General of Economic Affairs (DIGENECO)
Ministry of Defence

Coat of Arms of General Directorate of Recruitment and Military Education (DIREGEM)
Ministry of Defence
Coat of Arms of the Operations Command
(MOPS)
EMAD

Coat of Arms of the Armed Forces Intelligence Center (CIFAS)
EMAD

Emblem of the Joint Cyberspace Command (MCCE)
EMAD

Coat of Arms of the Joint Special Operations Command (MCOE)
EMAD

Coat of Arms of the Health Operating Command (JESANOP)
EMAD

Coat of arms of the Armed Forces Verification Unit (UVE)
EMAD

Coat of Arms of the Armed Forces Communications and Information Systems Command (JCISFAS)
EMAD

Coat of arms of the C-IED National Component (CENCIED)
EMAD
Coat of Arms of the Defence Medical Inspector General's Office (IGSD)
Coat of Arms of the Defence Military Pharmacy Center (CEMILFARDEF)
IGSD

Coat of Arms of the Defence Institute of Toxicology (ITOXDEF)
IGSD

Coat of Arms of the Defence Institute of Preventive Medicine (IMPDEF)
IGSD

Coat of Arms of the Military Blood Transfusion Center (CTFAS)
IGSD

Coat of Arms of the Military Veterinary Center (CEMILVET)
IGSD
Emblem of the Military Construction Service

Coat of Arms of the Military Horse Breeding Service (SCCFAS)
Ministry of Defence

Coat of Arms of the Defence Cataloging Service (SERDEF)

Emblem of the Operations Research Service

Emblem of the Defence Statistical Service

Coat of Arms of the Personnel Council (COPERFAS)
Ministry of Defence

Coat of Arms of the Register Office of Armed Forces Professional Associations (RAPFAS)
COPERFAS
Coat of Arms of the Central Defence Academy
(ACD)
Coat of Arms of the Medical School (EMISAN)
Central Defence Academy

Emblem of the Military Audit Corps School
(EMI)
Central Defence Academy

Coat of Arms of the Military School of Legal Studies (EMEJ)
Central Defence Academy

Coat of Arms of the Military School of Music (EMUM)
Central Defence Academy

Coat of Arms of the Military School of Education Science (EMCE)
Central Defence Academy

Coat of Arms of the Military School of Languages (EMID)
Central Defence Academy
Emblem of the National Defence Studies Centre (CESEDEN)
Emblem of the Armed Forces Higher Staff College (ESFAS)
CESEDEN
Coat of Arms of the Military Jurisdiction
Coat of Arms of the Canary Islands Joint Command
(MACOCAN)
Proposed Unit
Emblem of the Military Medicine
(Common)

Emblem of the Military Medicine
(Ornamented)

Emblem of the Military Legal Corps

Emblem of the Military Audit Corps

Emblem of the Military Bands Corps

Emblem of the Joint Special Operations Command (MCOE)

Emblem of the Military Archbishopric
Badge of the Royal and Military Order of Saint Ferdinand

Badge of the Royal and Military Order of Saint Hermenegild
Emblem of the former Higher Defence Studies College (EALEDE)
CESEDEN
Emblem of the former Defence High Command (AEM)
Until 1975

Emblem of the former Defence High Command (AEM)
1975-1980

Emblem of the former Board of Joint Chiefs of Staff (JUJEM)
1980-1984

== Army ==
The Army has a fairly high number of coat of arms used by units, centres and organisms, it is the largest and most consistent military coats of arms collection in Spain. Emblems and badges of Army corps, military occupational specialties and some centres are also relevant. After the Uniformity Report adopted in December 1989, coats of arms design and standardization criteria for Spanish Army units and organizations were adopted according to Army Circular 371/70001/87. The Institute of Military History and Culture (Instituto de Historia y Cultura Militar), an agency of the Army, provides studies of coats of arms and definitive proposals.

Coats of arms used in the Spanish Army have supporters called attributos (attributes) and displayed diagonally, the most important supporters are:

- Units, centres and organisms of Infantry: Two Mauser rifles Spanish model 1893, armed with bayonets.
- Units, centres and organisms of Cavalry: Two Spanish lances model 1861 with flags.
- Units, centres and organisms of Artillery: Two 18th-century Spanish cannons.
- Units, centres and organisms of Military Engineers: One pick and one shovel.
- Units, centres and organisms of Signal Corps: Four Electrodes with rays.
- Units, centres and organisms of Logistics Corps: A Mauser rifle Spanish model 1893 armed with bayonet and one torch.
- Units, centres and organisms of Army Airmobile Force: Two helicopter rotors.
- The Army Headquarters, its divisions, directions, and dependent units directly reporting to it (except the King's Immemorial Infantry Regiment): Two Spanish captain general's batons.
- Staffs at all levels (except the Army Headquarters): Two oak branches.
- The Logistic Support Command and dependent organisms: Two torches.
- The Land Force, Canarias Command, Light Forces, Heavy Forces, General Commands, Military Governments and other units, centres and organizations commanded by a general: One Spanish general's baton and sabre.
- Units, centres and organizations commanded by a superior officer or an officer: One Spanish officer's baton and sabre.

Other relevant heraldic external ornaments are the Spanish Royal Crown and the name of the unit centres and organizations and sometimes the motto is also featured.

Emblem of the Army (ET)
Emblem of the Military Staff of the Army (EM)
Emblem of the Infantry Forces

Emblem of the Cavalry Forces

Emblem of the Artillery Forces (Common)

Emblem of Artillery Forces (Ornamented)

Emblem of Military Engineers

Emblem of Logistics Forces
Emblem of the Spanish Army Logistics Units (Badge)

Emblem of Specialists Corps

Emblem of the Army Sea Companies

Emblem of Polytechnic Engineers

Emblem and Badge of Military Police
Emblem of the Legion

Emblem of Regulares

Emblem of
Special operations forces

Emblem of Mountain Forces

Emblem of the Army Airmobile Force (FAMET)
Emblem of Sergeant Major of the Army
Coat of Arms of the Army Headquarters
(CGE)
Coat of Arms of the Army General Staff
(EME)
CGE
Coat of Arms of the Land Force (FUTER)

Coat of Arms of Canarias Command (MACAN)

Coat of Arms of the Operational Logistics Force (FLO)

Coat of Arms of the High Readiness Land Headquarters (CGTAD)

Coat of Arms of the NATO Rapid Deployable Corps-Spain Headquarters
(HQ NRDC-SP)
Coat of Arms of the Economic Affairs Directorate (DIAE)

Coat of Arms of the CIS Command (JCISAT)
CGE

Coat of Arms of the Logistic Support Command for Operations
(JALOG-OP)
FLO
Coat of Arms of the Army Inspector General's Office (IGE)
Coat of Arms of the Army Barracks Directorate (DIACU)
Formerly First Deputy Inspector General's Office

Coat of Arms of the Second Deputy Inspector General's Office "Sur" (SUIGESUR)

Coat of Arms of the Third Deputy Inspector General's Office "Pirenaica" (SUIGEPIR)

Coat of Arms of the Fourth Deputy Inspector General's Office "Noroeste" (SUIGENOR)

Coat of Arms of the Deputy Inspector's Office of the Canarian Forces Command (SUIMCANA)
Coat of Arms of the Infrastructures Directorate (DINF)
Inspector General's Office
Coat of Arms of the First Construction Command "Centro"
(COBRA-1)
Infrastructures Directorate

Coat of Arms of the Second Construction Command "Sur"
(COBRA-2)
Infrastructures Directorate

Coat of Arms of the Third Construction Command "Pirenaica"
(COBRA-3)
Infrastructures Directorate

Coat of Arms of the Fourth Construction Command "Noroeste"
(COBRA-4)
Infrastructures Directorate

Coat of Arms of the Fifth Construction Command "Canarias"
(COBRA-5)
Infrastructures Directorate

Coat of Arms of Ceuta Construction Command
(COBRACEU)
Infrastructures Directorate

Coat of Arms of Melilla Construction Command
(COBRAMEL)
Infrastructures Directorate
Coat of Arms of the Infantry Forces Inspector's Office (IINF)

Coat of Arms of the Cavalry Forces Inspector's Office (ICAB)

Coat of Arms of the Artillery Forces Inspector's Office (IART)

Coat of Arms of the Logistics Forces Inspector's Office (ILOG)
Coat of Arms of the Logistic Support Command (MALE)
Coat of Arms of the Acquisitions Directorate (DIAD)
MALE

Coat of Arms of the Integration of Logistics Functions Directorate (DINFULOG)
MALE
Coat of Arms of the Training and Doctrine Command (MADOC)
Coat of Arms of the Doctrine, Organization and Equipment Directorate (DIDOM)
MADOC

Coat of Arms of the Education, Training and Evaluation Directorate (DIENADE)
MADOC
Coat of Arms of the Training Command "Centro"
JEAPRECEN
DIENADE

Coat of Arms of the Training Command "Norte"
JEAPRENOR
DIENADE

Coat of Arms of the Training Command "Sur"
JEAPRESUR
DIENADE

Coat of Arms of the Training Command "Este"
JEAPRESTE
DIENADE

Coat of Arms of the Training Command of the Canary Islands
JEAPRECAN
DIENADE
Coat of Arms of the Personnel Command (MAPER)
Coat of Arms of the Personnel Directorate (DIPER)
MAPER

Coat of Arms of the Personnel Support Directorate (DIAPER)
MAPER

Coat of Arms of the Health Directorate (DISAN)
MAPER
Coat of Arms of División San Marcial

Coat of Arms of the Division Castillejos

Coat of Arms of Balearics General Command (COMANGEBAL)

Coat of Arms of Ceuta General Command (COMENGECEU)

Coat of Arms of Melilla General Command (COMANGEMEL)
Coat of Arms of the Army Air Defence Command (MAAA)

Coat of Arms of the Army Field Artillery Command (MACA)

Coat of Arms of the Special Operations Force Command (MOE)

Coat of Arms of the Army Airmobile Force (FAMET)

Coat of Arms of the Engineer Command (MING)

Coat of Arms of the Signals Command (MATRANS)

Coat of Arms of the Logistic Brigade (BRILOG)

Coat of Arms of the Medical Brigade (BRISAN)
Coat of Arms of 1st "Aragón" (BOP I)

Coat of Arms of 2nd Legion Brigade "King Alfonso XIII"
(BOP LEG II)

Coat of Arms of 6th Paratrooper Brigade "Almogávares"
(BOP PAC VI)

Coat of Arms of 7th Brigade "Galicia"
(BOP VII)

Coat of Arms of 10th Brigade "Guzmán el Bueno" (BOP X)

Coat of Arms of 11th Brigade "Extremadura"
(BOP XI)

Coat of Arms of 12th "Guadarrama"
(BOP XII)

Coat of Arms of 16th Brigade "Canarias"
(BOP XVI)
Coat of Arms of the 1st King's Immemorial Infantry Regiment of AHQ (RI-1)
Coat of Arms of the 1st Intelligence Regiment (RINT-1)

Coat of Arms of the 1st Information Operations Regiment (ROI-1)

Coat of Arms of the 1st CBRN-Defense Regiment "Valencia" (RDNBQ)

Coat of Arms of the 1st Engineer Regiment
(RINT-1)

Coat of Arms of the 1st Signal Regiment (RT-1)

Coat of Arms of the 2nd Infantry Regiment "La Reina" (RI-2)

Coat of Arms of the 3rd Infantry Regiment "Príncipe" (RI-3)

Coat of Arms of the 3rd Cavalry Regiment "Montesa" (RC-3)

Coat of Arms of the 4th Armoured Regiment "Pavía" (RAC-4)

Coat of Arms of the 4th Coastal Artillery Regiment (RACTA-4)

Coat of Arms of the 6th Infantry Regiment "Saboya"
(RI-6)
Standardized

Coat of Arms of the 6th Infantry Regiment "Saboya"
(RI-6)
Common

Coat of Arms of the 7th Engineer Regiment (RING-7)

Coat of Arms of the 8th Engineer Regiment (RING-8)

Coat of Arms of the 9th Infantry Regiment "Soria" (RI-9)

Coat of Arms of the 10th Armored Cavalry Regiment "Alcántara" (RCAC-10)

Coat of Arms of the 10th Armored Regiment "Córdoba"
(RAC-10)
Standardized

Coat of Arms of the 10th Armored Regiment "Córdoba"
(RAC-10)
Common

Coat of Arms of the 11th Cavalry Regiment "España" (RC-11)

Coat of Arms of the 11th Field Artillery Regiment (RACA-11)

Coat of Arms of the 11th Engineers' Specialities (REI-11)

Coat of Arms of the 12th Cavalry Regiment "Farnesio" (RC-12)

Traditional and common emblem of the 12th Cavalry Regiment "Farnesio"
(RC-12)

Coat of Arms of the 12th Bridge Engineer Regiment (RPEI-12)

Coat of Arms of the 16th Armored Regiment "Castilla"
(RAC-16)
Standardized

Coat of arms of the 16th Armored Regiment "Castilla"
(RAC-16)
Common

Coat of Arms of the 20th Field Artillery Regiment (RACA-20)

Coat of Arms of the 21st Signal Regiment (RT-21)

Coat of Arms of the 22nd Signal Regiment (RT-22)

Coat of Arms of the 29th Infantry Regiment "Isabel la Católica"
(RI-29)
Ornamented

Coat of Arms of the 29th Infantry Regiment "Isabel la Católica"
(RI-29)
Common

Coat of Arms of the 30th Mixed Artillery Regiment (RAMIX-30)

Coat of Arms of the 31st Mechanized Infantry Regiment "Asturias" (RIMZ-31)
Standardized

Coat of Arms of the 31st Mechanized Infantry Regiment "Asturias" (RIMZ-31)
Common

Coat of Arms of the 31st Electronic Warfare Regiment (REW-31)

Coat of Arms of the 32nd Mixed Artillery Regiment (RAMIX-32)

Coat of Arms of the 32nd Electronic Warfare Regiment (REW-32)

Coat of Arms of the 45th Infantry Regiment "Garellano", (RI-45)

Coat of Arms of the 47th Infantry Regiment "Palma"
(RI-47)

Coat of Arms of the 49th Infantry Regiment "Tenerife"
(RI-49)

Coat of Arms of the 50th Infantry Regiment "Canarias"
(RI-50)
Standardized

Coat of Arms of the 50th Infantry Regiment "Canarias"
(RI-50)
Common

Coat of Arms of the 61st Armoured Infantry Regiment "Alcázar de Toledo" (RIAC-61)

Coat of Arms of the 62nd Infantry Regiment "Arapiles" (RI-62)

Coat of Arms of the 63rd Infantry Regiment "Barcelona" (RI-63)

Coat of Arms of the 63rd Rocket Artillery Regiment (RALCA-63)

Coat of Arms of the 64th Mountain Hunters Regiment "Galicia" (RCZM-64)

Coat of Arms of the 66th Infantry Regiment "América" (RI-66)

Coat of Arms of the 67th Infantry Regiment "Tercio Viejo de Sicilia" (RI-67)

Coat of Arms of the 71st Air Defence Artillery Regiment (RAAA-71)

Coat of Arms of the 73rd Air Defence Artillery Regiment (RAAA-73)

Coat of Arms of the 74th Air Defence Artillery Regiment (RAAA-74)

Coat of Arms of the 93rd Field Artillery Regiment (RACA-93)

Coat of Arms of the 94th Air Defence Artillery Regiment (RAAA-94)
Coat of Arms of the Parachute Brigade Headquarters
(CG BRIPAC-VI)
Coat of arms of the 4th Parachute Infantry Regiment "Napoles" (RIPAC-4)

Coat of arms of the 5th Infantry Regiment "Zaragoza" (RI-5)

Coat of Arms of the 8th Cavalry Regiment Lusitania (RC-8)
Coat of arms of the 1st-4 Parachute Infantry Flag "Roger de Flor" (BIPAC-I/4)

Coat of Arms of the 2nd-4 Protected Infantry Flag "Roger de Lauria" (BIP-II/4)

Coat of Arms of the 3rd-5 Protected Infantry Flag "Ortiz de Zárate" (BIP-III/5)
Coat of Arms of the 6th Field Parachute Artillery Battalion (GACAPAC-VI)

Coat of Arms of the 6th Engineer Battalion (BZAP-VI)

Coat of Arms of the 6th Logistic Battalion (GL-VI)

Coat of Arms of the 6th Parachute Signal Company (CIATRANSPAC-6)

Coat of Arms of the Parachute Brigade Headquarters Battalion (BON CG BRIPAC)
Coat of Arms of the Air Drop Unit (ULANPAC)

Coat of Arms of the Parachute Anti-Tank Defense Company (CIADCCPAC)

Coat of Arms of the Parachute Brigade Intelligence Company (CIAINTPAC)

Coat of Arms of the 1st-8 Light Armored Cavalry Group "Sagunto" (GCLAC-I/8)

Coat of Arms of the Base Services Unit "Príncipe" (USBA)

Coat of Arms of the Barracks Services Unit "Primo de Rivera" (USAC)

Coat of Arms of the Barracks Services Unit "Santa Bárbara" (USAC)

Coat of Arms of the Parachute Instruction Unit (UFPAC)
Coat of Arms of the 1st Spanish Legion Tercio "Great Captain"

Emblem of the 1st Spanish Legion Tercio "Great Captain"

Coat of Arms of the 2nd Spanish Legion Tercio "Duke of Alba"

Emblem of the 2nd Spanish Legion Tercio "Duke of Alba"
Coat of Arms of the 3rd Spanish Legion Tercio "Don Juan de Austria"

Emblem of the 3rd Spanish Legion Tercio "Don Juan de Austria"

Coat of Arms of the 4th Spanish Legion Tercio "Alexander Farnese"

Emblem of 4th Spanish Legion Tercio "Alexander Farnese"
Coat of Arms of the 1st-1 Protected Infantry Flag "Commander Franco"
(BIP-I/1)

Coat of Arms of the 4th-2 Protected Infantry Flag "Christ of Lepanto"
(BIP-IV/2)

Coat of Arms of the 7th-3 Protected Infantry Flag "Lieutenant Colonel Valenzuela"
(BIP-VII/3)

Coat of Arms of the 8th-3 Protected Infantry Flag "Christopher Columbus"
(BIP-VIII/3)

Coat of Arms of the 10th-4 Motorized Infantry Flag "Millán Astray"
(BIP-VIII/4)

Coat of Arms of the 2nd Light Armored Cavalry Group of the Legion "Catholic Monarchs"
(GCLACLEG-II)
Coat of Arms of the 2nd Headquarters Flag of the Legion Brigade
(BCG BRILEG-II)

Coat of Arms of the 2nd Field Artillery Battalion of the Legion
(GACALEG-II)

Coat of Arms of the 2nd Military Engineering Battalion (or Flag) of the Legion
(BZAPLEG-II)

Coat of Arms of the 2nd Logistics Group of the Legion
(GLLEG-II)

Coat of Arms of the 2nd Signals Company of the Legion
(CIATRANSLEG-II)

Coat of Arms of the Anti-Tank Defense Company of the Legion
(CIA-DCC-LEG)

Coat of Arms of the Intelligence Company of the Legion
(CIA-INT-LEG)

Coat of Arms of the Band of the Legion

Coat of Arms of the Base Services Unit "Álvarez de Sotomayor"
(USBA)
Coat of Arms of the 52nd Regulares Light Infantry Group/Regiment
(GR-52)

Coat of Arms of the 54th Regulares Light Infantry Group/Regiment
(GR-54)
Coat of Arms of the 1st-52 Regulares Battalion "Alhucemas"
(TR-I/52)

Coat of Arms of the 1st-54 Regulares Battalion "Tetuán"
(TR-I/54)
Coat of Arms of the Special Operations Command Headquarters Group
(GCG-MOE)

Coat of Arms of the 2nd Special Operations Group "Granada"
(GOE-II)

Coat of Arms of the 3rd Special Operations Group "Valencia"
(GOE-III)

Coat of Arms of the 4th Special Operations Group "Tercio del Ampurdán"
(GOE-IV)

Coat of Arms of the 19th Special Operations Group "Maderal Oleaga"
(GOE-XIX)

Coat of Arms of the Special Operations Command Signals Company
(CIA TRANS MOE)

Coat of Arms of the Barracks Services Unit "Alférez Rojas Navarrete"
(USAC)
Coat of Arms of the High Readiness Land Headquarters Battalion (BON CG CGTAD)

Coat of Arms of the Infantry Battalion "Guardia Vieja de Castilla" (BI)
Coat of Arms of the 1st-1 NBC-Defense Battalion (BNBQ I/1)

Coat of Arms of the 1st-1Combat Engineer Battalion
(BZAP-I/1)

Coat of Arms of the 1st-2 Protected Infantry Battalion "Princesa" (BIP-I/2)

Coat of Arms of the 1st-3 Protected Infantry Battalion "San Quintín" (BIP-I/3)

Coat of Arms of the 1st-4 Tank Infantry Battalion "Flandes" (BICC-I/4)

Coat of Arms of the 1st-3 Armored Cavalry Group "Cazadores de África" (GCAC-I/3)

Coat of Arms of the 1st-4 Coastal Artillery Battalion (GACTA-I/4)

Coat of Arms of the 1st-6 Mechanized Infantry Battalion "Cantabria" (BIMZ-I/6)

Coat of Arms of the 1st-7 Combat Engineer Battalion I/7
(BZAP-I/7)

Coat of Arms of the 1st-8 Combat Engineer Battalion
(BZAP-I/8)

Coat of Arms of the 1st-9 Protected Infantry Battalion "Fuerteventura" (BIPROT-I/9)

Coat of Arms of the 1st-10 Armored Cavalry Group "Taxdirt" (GCAC-I/10)

Coat of Arms of the 1st-10 Tank Infantry Battalion "Málaga"
(BICC-I/10)

Coat of Arms of the 1st-11 Light Armored Cavalry Group "Lanceros de Borbón" (GCLAC-I/11)

Coat of Arms of the 1st-11 Field Artillery Battalion (GACA-I/11)

Coat of Arms of the 2nd-11 Field Artillery Battalion (GACA-II/11)

Coat of Arms of the 1st-11 Road Building Battalion
(BCAM-I/11)

Coat of Arms of the 2nd 11 Camp Building Battalion
(BCAS-II/11)

Coat of arms of the 1st-12 Light Armored Cavalry Group "Santiago"
(GCLAC-I/12)

Coat of Arms of the 1st-12 Bridge Building Battalion
(BPON-I/12)

Coat of Arms of the 2nd-12 Railroad Building Battalion
(BEI-II/12)

Coat of Arms of the 1st-16 Tank Infantry Battalion "Mérida"
(BICC-I/16)

Coat of Arms of the 1st-20 Field Artillery Battalion (GACA-I/20)

Coat of Arms of the 1st-29 Protected Infantry Battalion "Zamora" (BIP-I/29)

Coat of Arms of the 1st-30 Field Artillery Battalion (GACA-I/30)

Coat of Arms of the 1st-31 Mechanized Infantry Battalion "Covadonga" (BIMZ-I/31)

Coat of Arms of the 1st-32 Field Artillery Battalion (GACA-I/32)

Coat of Arms of the 1st-45 Motorized Infantry Battalion "Guipúzcoa" (BIMT-I/45)

Coat of Arms of the 1st-47 Motorized Infantry Battalion "Filipinas" (BIMT-I/45)

Coat of Arms of the 1st-49 Motorized Infantry Battalion "Albuera"
(BIMT-I/49)

Coat of Arms of the 1st-50 Protected Infantry Battalion "Ceriñola"
(BIPROT-I/50)

Coat of Arms of the 1st-61 Tank Infantry Battalion "León"
(BICC-I/61)

Coat of Arms of the 1st-62 Mechanized Infantry Battalion "Badajoz" (BIMZ-I/62)

Coat of Arms of the 1st-63 Motorized Infantry Battalion "Cataluña"
(BIMT-I/63)

Coat of Arms of the 1st-63 Rocket Artillery Group (GALCA-I/63)

Coat of Arms of the 1st-64 Mountain Hunters Battalion "Pirineos" (BCZM-I/64)

Coat of Arms of the 1st-64 Skiing-Climbing Company
(CEE-1/64)

Coat of Arms of the 1st-66 Motorized Infantry Battalion "Montejurra" (BIMT-I/66)

Coat of Arms of the 1st-67 Motorized Infantry Battalion "Legazpi" (BIMT-I/67)

Coat of Arms of the 1st-71 Air Defence Artillery Battalion (GAAA-I/71)

Coat of Arms of the 1st-73 Aspide Air Defence Artillery Battalion
(GAAA-ASPIDE-I/73)

Coat of Arms of the 1st-74 Air Defence Artillery Battalion
(GAAA I/74)

Coat of Arms of the 1st-93 Field Artillery Battalion (GACA-I/93)

Coat of Arms of the 1st-94 Air Defence Artillery Battalion (GAAA-I/94)

Coat of Arms of the 1st Engineer Battalion
(BZAP I)

Coat of Arms of the 1st Signals Company
(CIATRANS-1)

Coat of Arms of the 2nd-2 Mechanized Infantry Battalion "Lepanto" (BIMZ-II/2)

Coat of Arms of the 2nd-3 Protected Infantry Battalion "Toledo" (BIP-II/3)

Coat of Arms of the 2nd-4 Cavalry Armored Group "Húsares de la Princesa"
(GCAC-II/4)

Coat of Arms of the 2nd-6 Protected Infantry Battalion "Las Navas" (BIP-II/6)

Coat of Arms of the 2nd-32nd Air Defence Artillery Battalion (GAAA-II/32)

Coat of Arms of the 2nd-10 Armored Cavalry Group "Almansa"
(GCAC-II/10)

Coat of Arms of the 2nd-11 Light Armored Cavalry Group "Numancia"
(GLCAC-II/11)

Coat of Arms of the 2nd-16 Armored Cavalry Group "Calatrava"
(GCAC-II/16)

Coat of Arms of the 2nd–30th Air Defence Artillery Battalion (GAAA-II/30)

Coat of Arms of the 2nd-31 Protected Infantry Battalion "Uad Ras" (BIP-II/31)

Coat of Arms of the 2nd-71 Air Defence Artillery Battalion (GAAA-II/71)

Coat of Arms of the 2nd-73 NASAMS Air Defence Artillery Battalion
(GAAA-NASAMS-II/73)

Coat of Arms of the 2nd-74 Air Defence Artillery Battalion (GAAAM-II/74)

Coat of Arms of the Coat of Arms of the 2nd-63 Information and Location Artillery Battalion
(GAIL-II/63)

Coat of Arms of the 3rd-73 Patriot Air Defence Artillery Battalion
(GAAA-PATRIOT-III/73)

Coat of Arms of the 3rd-74 Repair Unit (UR-III/74)

Coat of Arms of the 7th Field Artillery Battalion
(GACA-VII)

Coat of Arms of the 7th Engineer Battalion
(BZAP-VII)

Coat of Arms of the 7th Signals Company
(CIATRANS-7)

Coat of Arms of the 10th Field Artillery Battalion
(GACA-X)

Coat of Arms of the 10th Engineer Battalion
(BZAP-X)

Coat of Arms of the 10th Signals Company
(CIATRANS-10)

Coat of Arms of the 11th Field Artillery Battalion
(GACA-XI)

Coat of Arms of the 11th Engineer Battalion
(BZAP-XI)

Coat of Arms of the 11th Signals Company
(CIATRANS-11)

Coat of Arms of the 12th Armored Cavalry Group "Villaviciosa"
(GCAC-XII)

Coat of arms of the 12th Self Propelled Field Artillery Battalion
(GACA ATP XII)

Coat of Arms of the 12th Engineer Battalion
(BZAP-XII)

Coat of Arms of the 12th Signals Company
(CIATRANS-12)

Coat of Arms of the 16th Light Armored Cavalry Group "Milán" XVI (GCLAC-XVI)

Coat of Arms of the 16th Engineer Battalion
(BZAP-XVI)

Coat of Arms of the 16th Signals Company
(CIATRANS-16)

Coat of Arms of the 17th Signals Company
(CIATRANS-17)

Coat of Arms of the 18th Signals Company
(CIATRANS-18)

Coat of Arms of the Division "Castillejos" Headquarters

Coat of Arms of the Division "Castillejos" Headquarters Battalion

Coat of Arms of the Division "San Marcial" Headquarters

Coat of Arms of the Division "San Marcial" Headquarters Battalion

Coat of Arms of the Signal Battalion of the Air Defence Command (UTMAAA)

Coat of Arms of the 1st Brigade "Aragón" Headquarters Battalion
(BCG BR I)

Coat of Arms of the 7th Brigade "Galicia" Headquarters Battalion
(BCG BR VII)

Coat of Arms of the 10th Brigade "Guzmán el Bueno" Headquarters Battalion
(BCG BR X)

Coat of Arms of the 11th Brigade "Extremadura" Headquarters Battalion
(BCG BR XI)

Coat of Arms of the 12th Brigade "Guadarrama" Headquarters Battalion
(BCG BR XII)

Coat of Arms of the 16th Brigade "Canarias" Headquarters Battalion
(BCG BR XVI)

Coat of Arms of the Ceuta General Command Headquarters Battalion
(BCG-COMGECEU)

Coat of Arms of the Melilla General Command Headquarters Battalion
(BCG-COMGEMEL)

Coat of Arms of the Music Unit of the RI-1

Coat of Arms of the Support Unit of the RI-1
Coat of Arms of the Personnel Command of the Canary Islands (JEPERCANA)

Coat of Arms of the Personnel Command of Ceuta (JEPERCE)

Coat of Arms of the Personnel Command of Melilla (JEPERMEL)
Coat of Arms of the 1st-1 Intelligence Analysis Group
(GRINT-I/1)
RINT-1

Coat of Arms of the 2nd-1 Long Range Reconnaissance Group
(GROBT-II/1)
RINT-1

Coat of Arms of the 4th-1 Unmanned Aerial Vehicles Group
(GROSA IV/1)
RINT-1

Coat of Arms of the 1st Civil-Military Cooperation Battalion (BCIMIC-I/1)
ROI-1

Coat of Arms of the 2nd-1 Information Operations Group
(GROPS-II/1)
ROI-1
Coat of Arms of the 1st Military Police Battalion (BON PM-I)
Coat of Arms of the Army Airmobile Force Headquarters (CG-FAMET)
Coat of Arms of the 1st Attack Helicopter Battalion (BHELA-I)

Coat of Arms of the 2nd Emergency Helicopter Battalion (BHELEME-II)

Coat of Arms of the 3rd Maneuver Helicopter Battalion (BHELMA-III)

Coat of Arms of the 4th Maneuver Helicopter Battalion (BHELMA-IV)

Coat of Arms of the 5th Transport Helicopter Battalion (BHELTRA-V)

Coat of Arms of the 6th Maneuver Helicopter Battalion (BHELMA-VI)
Coat of Arms of the Army Airmobile Force Headquarters and Signals Battalion
(BCG-FAMET)

Coat of Arms of the Army Airmobile Force Logistics Group
(GL-FAMET)

Coat of Arms of the Army Helicopters Maintenance Park and Center (PCMHEL)

Coat of Arms of the Base Services Unit "Coronel Maté" (USBA)

Coat of Arms of the Army Helicopters Training Center (CEFAMET)
Coat of Arms of the Transport Grouping (ATP)

Coat of Arms of the 11th Logistics Support Grouping
(AALOG-11)

Coat of Arms of the 21st Logistics Support Grouping (AALOG-21)

Coat of Arms of the 41st Logistics Support Grouping (AALOG-41)

Coat of Arms of the 61st Logistics Support Grouping (AALOG-61)

Coat of Arms of the 81st Logistics Support Grouping (AALOG-81)
Coat of Arms of the 1st Logistics Group
(GLOG-I)

Coat of Arms of the 7th Logistics Air-transportable Group (GLAT-VII)

Coat of Arms of the 10th Logistics Group
(GLOG-X)

Coat of Arms of the 11th Logistics Group
(GLOG-XI)

Coat of Arms of the 12th Logistics Group
(GLOG-XII)

Coat of Arms of the 16th Logistics Group
(GLOG-XVI)

Coat of Arms of the 23rd Logistics Unit (ULOG-23)

Coat of Arms of the 24th Logistics Unit (ULOG-24)
Coat of Arms of the 1st-11 Supply Group
(GRABTO-I/11)

Coat of Arms of the 3rd-11 Projection Support Group
(GAPRO-III/11)

Coat of Arms of the 6th-11 Maintenance Group
(GRUMA-VI/11)

Coat of Arms of the 112th Services and Mechanical Workshops Unit
(UST-112)

Coat of Arms of the 1st-21 Supply Group
(GRABTO-I/21)

Coat of Arms of the 6th-21 Maintenance Group
(GRUMA-VI/21)

Coat of Arms of the 9th-21 Transport Group
(GTRANSP-IX/21)

Coat of Arms of the 212th Services and Mechanical Workshops Unit
(UST-212)

Coat of Arms of the 1st-41 Supply Group
(GRABTO-I/41)

Coat of Arms of the 6th-41 Maintenance Group
(GRUMA-VI/41)

Coat of Arms of the 9th-41 Transport Group
(GTRANSP-IX/41)

Coat of Arms of the 412th Services and Mechanical Workshops Unit
(UST-412)

Coat of Arms of the 1st-61 Supply Group
(GRABTO-I/61)

Coat of Arms of the 3rd-61 Logistics Group (GLOG-III/61)

Coat of Arms of the 612th Services and Mechanical Workshops Unit
(UST-612)

Coat of Arms of the 6th-81 Maintenance Group
(GRUMA-VI/81)

Coat of Arms of the 811th Munitions Battery
(BATMUN-811)

Coat of Arms of the 812th Services and Mechanical Workshops Unit
(UST-812)

Coat of Arms of the Automobile Unit of the RI-1

Coat of Arms of the Ceuta Sea Company

Coat of Arms of the Melilla Sea Company
Coat of Arms of the Projection Support Unit "Marques de Herrera" (UAPRO)

Coat of Arms of the Projection Support Unit "El Fuerte" (UAPRO)

Coat of Arms of the Projection Support Unit "Anatolio Fuentes" (UAPRO)

Coat of Arms of the Projection Support Unit "Christopher Columbus" (UAPRO)

Coat of Arms of the Projection Support Unit "San Isidro" (UAPRO)
Coat of Arms of the Logistics Centers Command
(JECELOG)
DINFULOG
Coat of Arms of the Logistics Material Supplying Park and Center (PCAMI)

Coat of Arms of the Signal Equipment Maintenance Park and Center (PCMMT)

Coat of Arms of the Military Engineers Equipment Maintenance Park and Center (PCMMI)

Coat of Arms of the 1st Wheeled Vehicles Maintenance Park and Center (PCMVR-1)

Coat of Arms of the 2nd Wheeled Vehicles Maintenance Park and Center (PCMVR-2)

Coat of Arms of the 1st Armored Systems Maintenance Park and Center (PCMASA-1)

Coat of Arms of the 2nd Armored Systems Maintenance Park and Center (PCMASA-2)

Coat of Arms of the Artillery Weaponry and Equipment Maintenance Park and Center (PCMAYMA)

Coat of Arms of the Air Defence, Coastal and Missile Systems Maintenance Park and Center (PCMASACOM)

Coat of Arms of the Hardware and Software Systems Maintenance Park and Center (PCMSHS)

Coat of Arms of the Army's Central Laboratory (LCE)
Coat of Arms of the Discontinuous Services Unit "Cavalcanti"
(USBAD)

Coat of Arms of the Discontinuous Services Unit "Ceuta"
(USBAD)

Coat of Arms of the Discontinuous Services Unit "Melilla"
(USBAD)

Coat of Arms of the Discontinuous Services Unit "Teniente Flomesta"
(USBAD)

Coat of Arms of the Discontinuous Services Unit "Oroel"
(USBAD)

Coat of Arms of the Discontinuous Services Unit "San Jorge"
(USBAD)

Coat of Arms of the Discontinuous Services Unit "La Cuesta"
(USBAD)
Coat of Arms of the Base Services Unit
"El Goloso"
(USBA)

Coat of Arms of the Base Services Unit
"Cerro Muriano"
USBA)

Coat of Arms of the Base Services Unit
"General Menacho"
USBA)

Coat of Arms of the Base Services Unit
"El Copero"
(USBA)

Coat of Arms of the Base Services Unit "Jaime I"
(USBA)

Coat of Arms of the Base Services Unit
"General Almirante"
(USBA)

Coat of Arms of the Base Services Unit "Araca"
(USBA)

Coat of Arms of the Base Services Unit
"Cid Campeador"
(USBA)

Coat of Arms of the Base Services Unit
"Conde de Gazola"
(USBA)

Coat of Arms of the Base Services Unit
"General Morillo"
(USBA)

Coat of Arms of the Base Services Unit
"El Empecinado"
(USBA)

Coat of Arms of the Base Services Unit "General Alemán Ramírez"
(USBA)

Coat of Arms of the Barracks Services Unit "General Álvarez de Castro"
(USAC)

Coat of Arms of the Barracks Services Unit "Cabo Noval"
(USAC)

Coat of Arms of the Barracks Services Unit "Loyola"
(USAC)

Coat of Arms of the Barracks Services Unit "Aizoáin"
(USAC)
Coat of Arms of the 1st Health Services Group (AGRUSAN-1)

Coat of Arms of the 3rd Health Services Group (AGRUSAN-3)

Coat of Arms of the Health Logistics Support Unit (UALSAN)
Coat of Arms of the 1st-1 Health Services Group
(UAPOSAN-I/1)
AGRUSAN-1

Coat of Arms of the 2nd-1 Health Services Group
(UAPOSAN-II/1)
AGRUSAN-1

Coat of Arms of the 3rd-3 Health Services Group
(GRUSAN-III/3)
AGRUSAN-3

Coat of Arms of the 4th-3 Health Services Group
(GRUSAN-IV/3)
AGRUSAN-3

Coat of Arms of the NBC Decontamination Sanitary Station (EDSBNQ)
AGRUSAN-3
Coat of Arms of the General Military Academy (AGM)
Coat of Arms of the Infantry Academy (ACINF)
Ornamented

Coat of Arms of the Infantry Academy (ACINF)
Common

Coat of Arms of the Cavalry Academy (ACAB)

Coat of Arms of the Artillery Academy (ACART)
Ornamented

Coat of Arms of the Artillery Academy (ACART)
Common

Coat of Arms of the Engineering Military Academy (ACING)

Coat of arms of the Logistics Academy (ACLOG)

Coat of Arms of the Basic General Academy of Non-Commissioned Officers (AGBS)

Coat of Arms of the Mountain and Special Operations Military School (EMMOE)

Coat of Arms of the Polytechnic School of the Army (ESPOL)

Coat of Arms of the Nuclear, Biological and Chemical Defence Military School (EMDNBQ)

Coat of Arms of the Central School of Physical Education (ECEF)
Infantry Academy
Coat of Arms of the 1st Troop Training Centre (CFOT-1)

Coat of Arms of the 2nd Troop Training Centre (CFOT-2)

Coat of Arms of the National Training Center "Chinchilla"
(CENAD Chinchilla)

Coat of Arms of the National Training Center "San Gregorio"
(CENAD San Gregorio)
Coat of Arms of the Army War College (ESGET)

Coat of Arms of the Military Inter-Arms School (EINT)
Army War College

Coat of Arms of the Geography Centre of the Spanish Army (CEGET)

Coat of Arms of the Army Orphan Patronage
(PAHUET)
Coat of Arms of the Military Culture and History Center "Canarias" (CHCMCAN)

Coat of Arms of the Military Culture and History Center "Centro" (CHCMCEN)

Coat of Arms of the Military Culture and History Center "Sur" (CHCMSUR)

Coat of Arms of the Military Culture and History Center "Noroeste" (CHCMNOR)

Coat of Arms of the Military Culture and History Center "Pirenaico" (CHCMPIR)

Coat of Arms of the Military Culture and History Center "Baleares" (CHCMBAL)

Coat of Arms of the Military Culture and History Center "Ceuta" (CHCMCEU)

Coat of Arms of the Military Culture and History Center "Melilla" (CHCMMEL)
Emblem of the IHCM Fortress Defense Course

Emblem of the IHCM Introduction to Military History Course

Emblem of the IHCM General and Military Heraldry Course

Emblem of the IHCM Military Heritage Course

Emblem of the IHCM History and Aesthetics of Military Music Course

Emblem of the IHCM Uniformology Course

Emblem of the IHCM Military Vexillology Course

Emblem of the IHCM Weaponry Course
Coat of Arms of General Military Archives of Madrid (AGMIMAD)

Coat of Arms of General Military Archives of Ávila (AGMAV)

Coat of Arms of General Military Archives of Segovia (AGMSE)

Coat of Arms of General Military Archives of Guadalajara (AGMGU)
Coat of Arms of the Central Military Library (BCM)

Emblem of the Army Museum
(ME)
Former Emblem of the Army
(1943–1975)
Coat of Arms of the former 1st Military Region
(Until 1984)

Coat of Arms of the former 2nd Military Region
(Until 1984)

Coat of Arms of the former 3rd Military Region
(Until 1984)

Coat of Arms of the former 4th Military Region
(Until 1984)

Coat of Arms of the former 5th Military Region
(Until 1984)

Coat of Arms of the former 6th Military Region
(Until 1984)

Coat of Arms of the former 7th Military Region
(Until 1984)

Coat of Arms of the former 8th Military Region
(Until 1984)

Coat of Arms of the former 9th Military Region
(Until 1984)
Coat of Arms of the former General Captaincy of the Balearic Islands
(Until 1984)

Coat of Arms of the former General Captaincy of the Canary Islands
(Until 1984)

Coat of Arms of Ceuta General Command
(Until 1984)

Coat of Arms of Melilla General Command
(Until 1984)
Coat of Arms of the former 1st Military Region, "Centro"
(1984–1997)

Coat of Arms of the former 2nd Military Region, "Sur"
(1984–1997)

Coat of Arms of the former 3rd Military Region, "Levante"
(1984–1997)

Coat of Arms of the former 4th Military Region, "Pirenaica Oriental"
(1984–1997)

Coat of Arms of the former 5th Military Region, "Pirenaica Occidental"
(1984–1997)

Coat of Arms of the former 6th Military Region, "Noroeste"
(1984–1997)
Coat of Arms of the former 1st Military Region, "Centro"
(1997–2002)

Coat of Arms of the former 2nd Military Region, "Sur"
(1997–2002)

Coat of Arms of the former 3rd Military Region, "Pirenaica"
(1997–2002)

Coat of Arms of the former 4th Military Region, "Noroeste"
(1997–2002)
Coat of Arms of the former Military Zone of the Balearic Islands
(1984–2002)

Coat of Arms of the former Military Zone of the Canary Islands
(1984–2002)
Coat of Arms of the Former Inspector General of Mobilization's Office (IGM)

Coat of Arms of the Former Transport Directorate (DITRA)

Former Coat of Arms of the Signals Command (MATRANS)
Coat of Arms of the former 1st Armoured Division "Brunete"

Coat of arms of the former 2nd Mechanized Division "Guzmán el Bueno"

Coat of arms of the former 3rd Motorized Infantry Division "Maestrazgo"

Coat of arms of the former 4th Mountain Division "Urgel"

Coat of arms of the former 6th Mountain Division "Navarra"
Coat of Arms of the former Heavy Forces (FPES)

Coat of Arms of former Light Forces (FUL)
Coat of Arms of the former Coastal Artillery of the Strait Command (MACTAE)

Coat of Arms of the former Coastal Artillery Command (MACTA)

Coat of Arms of the former 1st Brigade of Mountain Hunters "Aragón"
(BCZM-I)

Coat of Arms of the former Mountain Troops Command "Aragón" (JTM)

Coat of Arms of the former 1st Cavalry Brigade "Jarama" (BRICAB-I)

Coat of Arms of the former 2nd Cavalry Brigade "Castillejos" (BRICAB)

Former Coat of Arms of the 2nd Legion Brigade "King Alfonso XIII"
(BRILEG)
First Version

Former Coat of Arms of the 2nd Legion Brigade "King Alfonso XIII"
(BRILEG)
Second Version

Coat of Arms of the former 3rd Light Infantry Brigade "Maestrazgo" (BRIL-III)

Coat of Arms of the former 4th Light Infantry Brigade "Urgel" (BRIL-IV)

Coat of Arms of the former 5th Light Infantry Brigade "San Marcial" (BRIL-V)

Coat of Arms of the former 6th Parachute Infantry Brigade "Almogávares" (BRIPAC)

Coat of Arms of the former 7th Light Infantry Brigade "Galicia" (BRILAG)

Coat of Arms of the former 10th Mechanized Infantry Brigade "Guzmán el Bueno" (BRIMZ-X)

Coat of Arms of the former 11th Mechanised Infantry Brigade "Extremadura" (BRIMZ-XI)

Coat of Arms of the former 12th Armored Infantry Brigade "Guadarrama" (BRIAC-XII)

Coat of Arms of the former 16th Light Infantry Brigade "Canarias" (BRILCAN-XVI)
Coat of Arms of the former 1st Land Logistics Force
(FLT-1)

Coat of Arms of the former 2nd Land Logistics Force
(FLT-2)
Coat of Arms of the former 1st Light Armored Cavalry Regiment "Santiago" (RCLAC-1)

Coat of Arms of the former 2nd Signal Regiment

Coat of Arms of the former 4th Light Armoured Cavalry Regiment "Pavía" (RACAC-4)

Traditional Emblem of the former Cavalry Regiment "Almansa"

Coat of Arms of the former 5th Light Armoured Cavalry Regiment "Almansa" (RCLAC-5)

Traditional Emblem of the former Cavalry Regiment "Numancia"

Coat of Arms of the former 9th Light Armoured Cavalry Regiment "Numancia" (RCLAC-9)

Coat of Arms of the former 10th Mechanized Infantry Regiment "Córdoba"
(RIMZ-10)

Coat of Arms of the former 13th Railway Regiment

Traditional Emblem of the former Cavalry Regiment "Villaviciosa"

Coat of Arms of the former 14th Light Armoured Cavalry Regiment "Villaviciosa" (RCLAC-14)

Coat of Arms of the former 14th Field Artillery Regiment (RACA-14)

Coat of Arms of the former 16th Mechanized Infantry Regiment "Castilla"(RIMZ-16)

Coat of Arms of the former 22nd Hunter Cavalry Regiment "Victoria Eugenia"

Coat of Arms of the former 32nd Infantry Regiment San Quintín (RINF-32)

Coat of Arms of the former 37th Infantry Regiment Órdenes Militares
(RINF-37)

Coat of Arms of the former 51st Logistics Support Grouping
(AALOG-51)

Coat of Arms of the former 62nd Rocket Artillery Regiment (RALCA-62)

Coat of Arms of the former 72nd Air Defence Artillery Regiment
(RAAA-72)

Coat of Arms of the former 81st Air Defence Artillery Regiment (RAAA-81)

Coat of Arms of the former 91st Mixed Artillery Regiment (RAMIX-91)
Coat of Arms of the former 2nd Health Services Group (AGRUSAN-2)

Coat of Arms of the former Field Hospital Group (AGRUHOC)
Coat of Arms of the former 1st Mountain Artillery Battalion
(GAM-I)

Coat of Arms of the former 1st Mountain Engineer Unit
(UZM-I)

Coat of Arms of the former 1st-4 Armored Cavalry Group "Cazadores de María Cristina" (GCAC-I/4)

Coat of Arms of the former 1st-62 Rocket Artillery Group
(GALCA-I/62)

Coat of Arms of the former 1st-81 SAM Patriot Missile Artillery Battalion (GAAA-I/81)

Coat of Arms of the former 2nd-11 Mechanized Cavalry Group "Húsares Españoles"
(GCMZ-II/11)

Coat of Arms of the former 2nd-52 Regulares Battalion "Rif"
(TR-II/52)

Coat of Arms of the former 3rd-66 Mountain Hunters Battalion "Estella"
(BCZM-III/66)

Coat of Arms of the former 5th Field Artillery Battalion
(GACA V)

Coat of Arms of the former 5th Engineer Unit
(UZAP-V)

Coat of Arms of the former 5th Signals Company
(CIATRANS-5)

Coat of Arms of the former Army Airmobile Force Signals Battalion (BT-FAMET)
Coat of Arms of the former 1st Divisional Logistics Group
(AGLD-1)

Coat of Arms of the former Divisional Logistics Group (GLOGDIV)
AALOG-61
Coat of Arms of the former Audit Corps Academy
(ACINT)

Coat of Arms of the Military Stud (YM)

== Navy ==
The Spanish Navy uses more emblems than coats of arms used by units, flotillas, Navy Marines, Naval Action Forces, Maritime Action Forces, centres, organisms and Fleet and Navy General Headquarters. The most habitual elements are anchors, cords, ships constructed at different dates and the Spanish royal crown.

Emblem of the Navy (A)
Emblem of the Military Staff of the Navy (EMA)

Emblem of the Fleet

Emblem of the Military Staff of the Fleet

Emblem of the Logistics Forces

Emblem of the Logistics Support Head Office (JAL)

Emblem of the Personnel Head Office (JEPER)

Emblem of the Personnel Support Directorate
(DIASPER)

Emblem of the Supply and Transports Directorate (DAT)

Emblem of the Directorate of Naval Education
(DIENA)

Emblem of the Military Operations Research and Statistics Cabinet
(GIMO)

Emblem of the Maritime Action Forces (FAN)

Emblem of the Military Staff of the Naval Action Forces

Emblem of the 1st Group of Naval Action (COMGRUP-1)
Naval Action Forces

Emblem of the 2nd Group of Naval Action (COMGRUP-2)
Naval Action Forces

Coat of Arms of the 31st Escort Squadron
1st Group of Naval Action
Naval Action Forces
(FAN)

Emblem of the 41st Escorts Squadron
1st Group of Naval Action
Naval Action Forces
(FAN)

Emblem of the Naval Beach Group
2nd Group of Naval Action
Naval Action Forces
(FAN)

Emblem of the Maritime Action Forces (FAM)

Emblem of the Maritime Action Force Units Command in Cádiz
(MARDIZ)

Emblem of the Maritime Action Force Units Command in Cartagena
(MARCART)

Emblem of the Maritime Action Force Units Command in Ferrol
(MARFER)

Emblem of the Canary Islands Naval Command
(ALCANAR)
Maritime Action Forces
(FAM)

Emblem of the Balearic Islands Naval Sector
(SENBAL)
Maritime Action Forces
(FAM)

Badge/Emblem of the Navy Air Arm

Emblem of the Spanish Navy Submarine Units
(FLOSUB)

Badge/Emblem of the Navy Combat Divers

Emblem of the Navy Divers Centre (CBA)

Emblem of the Mine Countermeasures Force
(MCM)

Emblem of the Combat Operational Qualification and Assessment Centre
(CEVACO)

Emblem of the Fleet Doctrine Centre
(CEFLOT)

Emblem of the Tactical Programs and the Fleet Training and Instruction Centre
(CPT-CIA)

Emblem of the Navy Military Police (PN)

Emblem of the Naval Officers' Military Academy (ENM)

Emblem of the Non-Commissioned Officers Academy
(ESUBO)

Emblem of the Naval War College
(EGN)

Emblem of the Aircraft Crews School (EDAN)

Emblem of the Naval Submarine School
(ESUBMAR)

Emblem of the Navy Divers School
(EBA)

Emblem of Naval Weapons Engineer School
(ETSIAN)

Emblem of Higher Military Logistics Studies Center of the Navy
(CESIA)

Emblem of the Physics and Mathematics School
(EES)

Emblem of the Hydrographic School (EH)

Emblem of the "Antonio de Escaño" Specialist School (ESEAE)

Emblem of the Specialist School of La Graña
(ESENGRA)
Coat of Arms of the Naval Command of Algeciras
Maritime Action Forces
(FAM)

Coat of Arms of the Naval Command of Alicante
Maritime Action Forces
(FAM)

Coat of Arms of the Naval Command of Almería
Maritime Action Forces
(FAM)

Coat of Arms of the Naval Command of Barcelona
Maritime Action Forces
(FAM)

Coat of Arms of the Naval Command of Bilbao
Maritime Action Forces
(FAM)

Coat of Arms of the Naval Command of Cádiz
Maritime Action Forces
(FAM)

Coat of Arms of the Naval Command of Cartagena
Maritime Action Forces
(FAM)

Coat of Arms of the Naval Command of Ceuta
Maritime Action Forces
(FAM)

Coat of Arms of the Naval Command of A Coruña
Maritime Action Forces
(FAM)

Coat of Arms of the Naval Command of Ferrol
Maritime Action Forces
(FAM)

Coat of Arms of the Naval Command of Gijón
Maritime Action Forces
(FAM)

Coat of Arms of the Naval Command of Huelva
Maritime Action Forces
(FAM)

Coat of Arms of the Naval Command of Mahón
Maritime Action Forces
(FAM)

Coat of Arms of the Naval Command of Málaga
Maritime Action Forces
(FAM)

Coat of Arms of the Naval Command of Melilla
Maritime Action Forces
(FAM)

Coat of Arms of the Naval Command of the Miño
Maritime Action Forces
(FAM)

Coat of Arms of the Naval Command of Palma
Maritime Action Forces
(FAM)

Coat of Arms of the Naval Command of Las Palmas
Maritime Action Forces
(FAM)

Coat of Arms of the Naval Command of San Sebastián
Maritime Action Forces
(FAM)

Coat of Arms of the Naval Command of Santander
Maritime Action Forces
(FAM)

Coat of Arms of the Naval Command of Seville
Maritime Action Forces
(FAM)

Coat of Arms of the Naval Command of Tarragona
Maritime Action Forces
(FAM)

Coat of Arms of the Naval Command of Tenerife
Maritime Action Forces
(FAM)

Coat of Arms of the Naval Command of Valencia
Maritime Action Forces
(FAM)

Coat of Arms of the Naval Command of Vigo
Maritime Action Forces
(FAM)
Coat of Arms of the Naval Assistantship of Arrecife
Maritime Action Forces
(FAM)

Coat of Arms of the Naval Assistantship of Ayamonte
Maritime Action Forces
(FAM)

Coat of Arms of the Naval Assistantship of the Bidasoa
Maritime Action Forces
(FAM)

Coat of Arms of the Naval Assistantship of Castellón
Maritime Action Forces
(FAM)

Coat of Arms of the Naval Assistantship of Ibiza
Maritime Action Forces
(FAM)

Coat of Arms of the Naval Assistantship of La Palma
Maritime Action Forces
(FAM)

Coat of Arms of the Naval Assistantship of Puerto del Rosario
Maritime Action Forces
(FAM)

Coat of Arms of the Naval Assistantship of Roses
Maritime Action Forces
(FAM)

Coat of Arms of the Naval Assistantship of San Sebastián de La Gomera
Maritime Action Forces
(FAM)

Coat of Arms of the Naval Assistantship of Villagarcía
Maritime Action Forces
(FAM)
Emblem of the Royal Institute and Observatory of the Navy
(ROA)

Emblem of the Hydrographic Institute of the Navy (IHM)

Emblem of the Naval History and Culture Institute (IHCN)

Emblem of the
Naval Museum (MN)

Emblem of the Navy Orphan Patronage
(PAHUAR)
Badge/Emblem of the
Navy Marines
Coat of Arms of the Navy Marines Corps General Command
Coat of Arms of the Tercio of the Navy (TEAR)
Navy Marines

Coat of Arms of the
Marine Infantry Brigade
(BRIMAR)
Tercio of the Navy
Coat of Arms of the Naval Protection Force (FUPRO)
Navy Marines
Coat of Arms of Northern Regiment [Tercio]
(TERNOR)
Naval Protection Force

Coat of Arms of Southern Regiment [Tercio]
(TERSUR)
Naval Protection Force

Coat of Arms of
Eastern Regiment [Tercio]
(TERLEV)
Naval Protection Force

Coat of Arms of Madrid Security Group
(AGRUMAD)
Naval Protection Force

Coat of Arms of Canary Islands Security Unit
(USCAN)
Naval Protection Force
Coat of Arms of the Naval Special Warfare Force
(FGNE)
Navy Marines

Badge of the Naval Special Warfare Force
(FGNE)

Coat of Arms of "General Albacete Fuster" Marine Corps School
(EIMGAF)
Badge of the former Navy Medicine
(Merged into Common Corps)

Coat of Arms of the former Special Operations Unit (UOE)

Coat of Arms of the former "Martín Álvarez" Section
Navy Marines

Emblem of the former 21st Escort Squadron

== Air and Space Force ==
There are more emblems than coats of arms used by Spanish Air and Space Force units, air bases, barracks, aerodromes, Air and Space Force General Headquarters, its dependent divisions and other organisms or centres. Air and Space Force emblems first appeared in 1913 displayed on the front part of the fuselage but they were not official until the 1920s. Most squadrons created after the Spanish Civil War didn't have an insignia until 1954, one year after the Pact of Madrid was signed by Spain and the United States. Since then all squadron insignias except the symbol belonged to García Morato Group were replaced. The use of Air Force emblems and badges increased with the introduction of patches on Military uniforms during the decade of the 1970s. An order of the Chief of Staff of the Air and Space Force to regulate the patches was adopted in November 1995. José Ramón Pardo Onrubia and Carlos Bourdón García's book about Spanish Air Force symbols said it would be appropriate to standardize emblems and badges of units centres and organisms.

The Air and Space Force Emblem was granted by Royal Warrant Circular of April 1913. Authorities were looking for quality projects to avoid one old-fashioned design in the future. The chosen proposal, still in use today, was created by Princess and Infanta Beatrice of Saxe-Coburg and Gotha, wife of Spanish Infante and airman Alfonso, Duke of Galliera. Princess Beatrice drew two silver wings united by a red disc with the Spanish royal crown. This is likely Princess Beatrice, Egyptologist and drawer, would have based on the Egyptian scarab, the winged disc of the Burial site of Seti I or Maat's wings. In Spain the Air and Space Force Emblem is known colloquially as Rokiski the last name of the engraver who created military pilot wings between 1939 and 1965. Pilot wings and other Air and Space Force specialties are based on the Rokiski.

Emblem of the Air and Space Force (EAE)
Pilot Wings

Parachute Wings

Air Observer Wings

Pilot and Air Observer Wings

Parachute and Air Observer Wings

Medical Corp Wings
(Merged into Common Corps)

Logistic Corp Wings

Logistic Corp Wings
(Variant)
Emblem of the Military Staff (EMA)

Emblem of the Air and Space Force Chief of Staff Office (GAJEMA)

Emblem of the Air Combat Command (MACON)

Emblem of the General Air Warfare Command (MAGEN)

Emblem of the Canary Islands Air Command (MACAN)

Emblem of the Air Warfare Centre (CEGA)

Emblem of the Logistic Support Command (MALOG)

Emblem of the Personnel Command (MAPER)

Emblem of the Education Directorate (DEN)

Emblem of the Economic and Financial Affairs Directorate (DAE)

Emblem of the Air and Space Force General Headquarters and Headquarters Security Group(ACGEA)

Emblem of the Command and Control Central Group (GRUCEMAC)

Emblem of the Central System of Air Command and Control (JSMC)

Emblem of the Technical Services, Information Systems and Telecommunications Head (JSTCIS)

Emblem of the Quartermaster Logistics Center (CLOIN)

Emblem of the Signal Logistics Centre (CLOTRA)

Emblem of the 48th Wing

Emblem of the Air and Space Force Search and Rescue Service (SAR)

Emblem of the Parachute Engineer Squadron (EZAPAC)

Emblem of the Aerospace Medicine Training Centre (CIMA)

Emblem of the Military Air Medical Evacuation Unit (UMAER)

Emblem of the Cartographic and Photographic Centre
(CECAF)

Emblem of the General Air and Space Force Academy (AGA)

Emblem of the Non-Commissioned Officers Academy (ABA)

Emblem of the Paratrooper Military School "Méndez Parada" (EMP-MP)

Emblem of the Air and Space Force Police Branch (PA)

Emblem of the Air and Space Force Historical and Cultural Service (SHYCEA)

Emblem of the Air and Space Force Orphan Patronage
(PAHUEA)

== Civil Guard ==
The Civil Guard (Guardia Civil) units have the most consistent coats of arms collection after the Army. Except the patches, all identification badges of units are also standardized by according to General Order no. 4, 7th May 2015, on use of badges of the Guardia Civil. This regulation reformed the previous General Order no. 35, 14th August 1997, modified by General Orders 47 of 1997, 31 of 1998, 2 and 8 of 1999, 2 and 13 of 2002, and 11 and 17 of 2003.

These standardized badges are as follows:

- Service badges, they comprise the shields linked to each specialty with a heraldic chief Azure with the monogram of the Civil Guard Or. They are the only compulsory to use.
- Graduate of Civil Guard courses badges, almost identical to the first but with their chiefs Gules.
- Function and merit badges, some of them are unstandardized. They are not obligatory.
- Destiny badges, removed since 2015, represented the zones with the heraldic shields of Spanish regions or autonomous cities and a bordure Argent, general directorates and sub-directorates used a bordure Or.

All coats of arms have been regulated and standardized by the Notice 1/2014, January 28, of the Guardia Civil Assistant Operations Directorate, that updates Annex 2 of the General Order no. 10, of 22nd November 2012, on Guardia Civil Military Honours and complements the General Order no. 4, 7th May 2015. The Notice 1/2014 describes the official design of the coats of arms contained on the guindons of the territorial divisions, units, services and commands of the Guadia Civil.

These coats of arms, with a few exceptions like the Traffic Grouping or the GREIM, have an Iberian escutcheon shape. In all cases are used as supporters the sword and the fasces (the elements of the emblem of the Guardia Civil) but both less inclined to highlight the heraldic shields. All of them also uses the Spanish royal crown as crest, the name of the unit or service depicted below the shield in a banderole and never show the heraldic chiefs with the monogram. There are two notable exceptions although they use standardized coats of arms on their guindons, the College of the Young Guards "Duke of Ahumada", that maintains its traditional heraldry, and the Non-Commissioned Officers and Guards Academy, that displays its motto on a second banderole and applies gothic lettering.

Emblem of the
Civil Guard (GC)
Monogram of the
Civil Guard

Monogram of the
Civil Guard
(Variant)

Coats of Arms

Assistant Operations Directorate (DAO)

Operations Command (MOP)
[Obsolete]

Technical Cabinet (GT)

Personnel General Sub-Directorate (SGP)

Support General Sub-Directorate (SGA)

Staff (EMGC)
1st Zone -
Madrid Community

2nd Zone -
Castile–La Mancha

3rd Zone - Extremadura

4th Zone - Andalusia

5th Zone - Murcia Region

6th Zone -
Valencian Community

7th Zone - Catalonia

8th Zone - Aragón

9th Zone - Navarre

10th Zone - La Rioja

11th Zone - Basque Country

12th Zone -
Castile and León

13th Zone - Cantabria

14th Zone - Asturias

15th Zone - Galicia

16th Zone - Canary Islands

17th Zone - Baleraric Islands

Ceuta Command

Melilla Command
Reserve and Security Grouping (ARS)

Traffic Grouping (ATGC)

Cavalry Squadron (ECGC)

Rural Action Unit (UAR)

Rapid Reaction Group (GAR)
Rural Action Unit

Underwater Activities Group (GEAS)

Operative Security Group (GOS)

Mountain Rescue and Intervention Service
(GREIM)

Control of Weapons and Explosive Material Service
(IAEGC)

Education Command
(JE)

Special and Reserve Units Command
(JUER)

Judiciary Police Service
(PJGC)

Air Service (SAGUCI)

Citizen Security Service (SECIC)

Canine Service (SECIR)

Fiscal Service (SFCG)

Naval Service (SEMAGUCI)

Nature Protection Service (SEPRONA)

Protection and Security Service (SEPROSE)

Intelligence Service (SIGC)

Explosive Artifacts Defuser and CBRN Defense Service
(TEDAX)

Central Operative Unit (UCO)
Judiciary Police Service

Special Intervention Unit (UEI)

Subsoils Reconnaissance Unit (URS)

Occupational Safety Service (SPGC)

Sanitary Service (SASGC)

Internal Affairs Service (SAIGC)
Officers Academy
(Aranjuez Center)

Officers Academy
(El Escorial Center)

Non-Commissioned Officers and Guards Academy

Traffic Academy (ET)

School of Young Guards "Duque de Ahumada"

Service and Graduate Course Badges

ARS
Service

Graduate Course

Traffic Grouping
Service

Graduate Course

Cavalry Squadron
Service

Graduate Course

Weaponry Specialist
Service

Graduate Course

Information Technology Specialist
Service

Graduate

Rapid Reaction Group
Service

Graduate Course

GEAS
Service

Graduate Course

GOS
Service

Graduate Course

GREIM
Service

Graduate Course

IAEGC
Service

Graduate Course

Teaching Personnel
Service

Graduate

Judiciary Police
Service

Graduate Course

Air Service
Service

Graduate Course

SECIC
Service

Graduate Course

Canine Service
Service

Graduate Course

Fiscal Service
Service

Graduate Course

Naval Service
Service

Graduate Course

SEPRONA
Service

Graduate Course

SEPROSE
Service

Graduate Course

Intelligence Service
Service

Graduate Course

TEDAX
Service

Graduate Course

UEI
Service

Graduate Course

URS
Service

Graduate Course

Occupational Safety Service
Service

Graduate Course

Sanitary Service
Service

Graduate

Internal Affairs Service
Service

Emblems/Patchs

Air Service
(SAGUCI)

Naval Service
(SEMAGUCI)
Traffic Grouping (ATGC)

Rapid Reaction Group
Rural Action Unit
(GAR)

Underwater Activities Group
(GEAS)

Operative Security Group (GOS)

Mountain Rescue and Intervention Service (GREIM)

Explosive Artifacts Defuser and CBRN Defense Service
(TEDAX)

Central Operative Unit (UCO)

Special Intervention Unit (UEI)
Reserve and Security Grouping
(ARS)

Special Security Group
Reserve and Security Grouping
(ARS-GES)

Infrastructure and Monitoring of Crisis Situations Department
(DISSC)

Citizen Security Service (SECIC)
Emblem of the Guardia Civil Foundation

Former Units

Coat of Arms of the former Auxiliary Corps
(Volunteers)

Former Destination Badges (Until 2015)

Assistant Operations Directorate

Technical Cabinet

Personnel General Sub-Directorate

Support General Sub-Directorate
1st Zone -
Madrid Community

2nd Zone -
Castile–La Mancha

3rd Zone - Extremadura

4th Zone - Andalusia

5th Zone - Murcia Region

6th Zone -
Valencian Community

7th Zone - Catalonia

8th Zone - Aragón

9th Zone - Navarre

10th Zone - La Rioja

11th Zone - Basque Country

12th Zone -
Castile and León

13th Zone - Cantabria

14th Zone - Asturias

15th Zone - Galicia

16th Zone - Canary Islands

17th Zone - Baleraric Islands

Ceuta Command

Melilla Command

== Royal Guard ==
Emblem of the Royal Guard (GR)
Shoulder Sleeve Insignia of the Royal Guard

Badge of the
"Monteros de Espinosa" Company
Army

Patch of the
"Monteros de Espinosa" Company

Badge of the
Marines "Mar Océano" Company
Navy

Patch of the
Marines "Mar Océano" Company

Badge of the
"Plus Ultra" Squadron
Air and Space Force

Patch of the
"Plus Ultra" Squadron

Emblem of the
Royal Escort Squadron
Army (Cavalry)

== Military Emergencies Unit ==
Coat of Arms of the Military Emergencies Unit (UME)
Coat of Arms of the Command and Headquarters (CG)
Coat of Arms of the 1st Emergency Intervention Battalion
(BIEM-I)

Coat of Arms of the 2nd Emergency Intervention Battalion
(BIEM-II)

Coat of Arms of the 3rd Emergency Intervention Battalion
(BIEM-III)

Coat of Arms of the 4th Emergency Intervention Battalion
(BIEM-IV)

Coat of Arms of the 5th Emergency Intervention Battalion
(BIEM-V)
Coat of Arms of the Emergency Intervention and Support Regiment
(RAIEM)
Coat of Arms of the Emergency Support Group
(GAEM)
RAIEM

Coat of arms of the Emergency Intervention and Environmental Technology Group
(GIETMA)
RAIEM
Coat of Arms of the Headquarters Unit (UCG)

Coat of Arms of the Communications Battalion
(BTUME)

Coat of Arms of the Aerial Group
(AGRUMEDA)

Coat of Arms of the Military Emergencies School
(EMES)

== Other units and organisms ==
Coat of Arms of the Volunteer Reserve (RESVOL)

Coat of Arms of the Spanish Armed Forces and Civil Guard Veterans (RHVFASYGC)

== Other badges ==
Military Teaching Badge

Peacekeeping Operations Merit Badge

Badge of the Military Jurisdiction

== See also ==
- Armorial of Spain
- Spanish heraldry
- Spanish Armed Forces
