= Brigade "Rey Alfonso XIII" II of the Legion =

Coat of arms of the Brigade.

The Brigade "Rey Alfonso XIII" II of the Legion (BRILEG) is a major tactical military formation of the Spanish Legion comprising two tercios with elements based in Viator (Almeria) and Ronda (Málaga)

== History ==
The Brigade was created on August 11, 1995, occupying the facilities of the former XXIII Motorized Infantry Brigade. In 1996 the brigade was granted the denomination of "King Alfonso". The new Brigade was part of the Army's Rapid Action Forces, which in 2006 was renamed Light Force Command. It reorganized in 2015 into a Light Multi-Purpose Organic Brigade.

== Structure ==
- Brigade "King Alfonso XIII" II of the Legion, in Viator
  - Headquarters Bandera II of the Legion, in Viator
  - Light Armored Cavalry Group of the Legion "Reyes Católicos" II, in Ronda (Centauro tank destroyers and VEC-M1 cavalry scout vehicles)
  - Tercio "Juan de Austria" No. 3 of the Legion, in Viator
    - Protected Infantry Bandera "Valenzuela" VII/3 (BMR-M1 armored personnel carriers)
    - Protected Infantry Bandera "Colón" VIII/3 (BMR-M1 armored personnel carriers)
  - Tercio "Alejandro Farnesio" No. 4 of the Legion, in Ronda
    - Motorized Infantry Bandera "Millán Astray" X/4
  - Field Artillery Group II of the Legion, in Viator (L-118A1 105 mm towed howitzers)
  - Engineer Bandera II of the Legion, in Viator
  - Logistic Group II of the Legion, in Viator
