= Special Operations Command (Spain) =

Spanish Army command

Coat of arms of the Special Operations Command.

Guidon of the Special Operations Force Command.

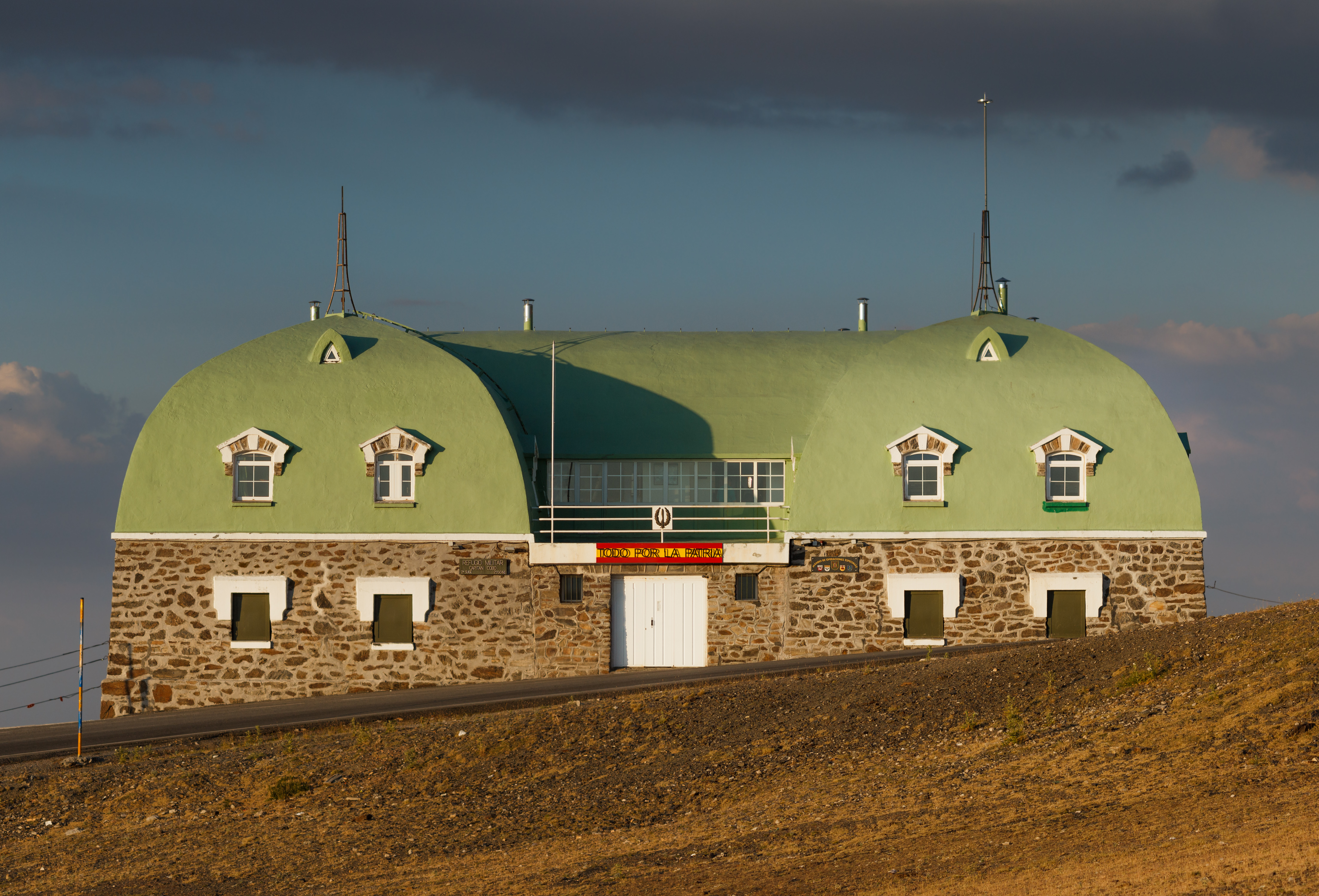
Barracks used by the Special Operations Command for high altitude training in Sierra Nevada.

The Special Operations Command (Spanish: Mando de Operaciones Especiales) is the command charged with overseeing the various Special Operations Groups of the Spanish Army.

It is based in Alicante, Alférez Rojas Navarrete barracks.

It was created in 1997, following other NATO armies organization. In the 1980s the Spanish Army had created six Special Operation Groups and also had a Special Operations group in the Spanish Legion, the Bandera de Operaciones Especiales de la Legión.

Subordinate operating units are Grupos de Operaciones Especiales Valencia III, Tercio del Ampurdán IV, and Bandera de Operaciones Especiales "C. L. Maderal Oleaga" XIX de la Legión.

== Organization ==
The three Special Operations Groups are subordinated:

Insignia	Group
	3rd Special Operations Group "Valencia" (Grupo de Operaciones Especiales "Valencia" III)
	4th Special Operations Group "Tercio del Ampurdán" (Grupo de Operaciones Especiales "Tercio del Ampurdán" IV)
	19th Special Operations Group "Maderal Oleaga" (Grupo de Operaciones Especiales "Maderal Oleaga" XIX)

There are two Special Operations Command auxiliary units:

Insignia	Unit
	Special Operations Command Headquarters Group (Grupo del Cuartel General del Cuartel General de Operaciones Especiales)
	Special Operations Command Signals Company (Compañía de Transmisiones del Mando de Operaciones Especiales)

== See also ==
- Special Operations Groups of the Spanish Army
- Structure of the Spanish Army in 1989
