= 19th Special Operations Group "Maderal Oleaga" =

Spanish special operations group

Coat of arms of the 19th Special Operations Group

The 19th Special Operations Group "Caballero Legionario Maderal Oleaga" (Spanish:Grupo de Operaciones Especiales "Caballero Legionario Maderal Oleaga" XIX), GOE XIX, is one of the three currently existing Special Operations Groups and so is subordinated to the Special Operations Command. It was the former Special Forces unit of the Spanish Legion and was known as Bandera de Operaciones Especiales de la Legión (Legion Special Operations Bandera (battalion)), BOEL.

The members of this unit received training in:

- SCUBA/Maritime Warfare
- Arctic and Mountain Warfare
- Sabotage and Demolitions
- Parachute and HALO techniques
- Long Range Reconnaissance
- Counter-terrorism and CQB
- Vehicle insertion
- Sniping
- SERE (Survival, Escape, Resistance and Evasion)

In 2002 the BOEL was renamed Grupo de Operaciones Especiales "Caballero Legionario Maderal Oleaga" XIX and was moved to Alicante as unit of the Special Operations Command of the Spanish Army. GOE XIX currently accepts applicants from other light infantry units and no longer forms part of the Legion.

== See also ==
- Special Operations Groups of the Spanish Army
- Special Operations Command of the Spanish Army
- Spanish Legion
