= Special Operations Groups (Spain) =

Grupos de Operaciones Especiales
- Emblem
- Active: 1977–present
- Country: Spain
- Branch: land forces
- Type: special forces
- Size: Approx. 900 (2020)
- Nickname: Boinas Verdes (Green Berets)

The Special Operations Groups (Spanish: Grupos de Operaciones Especiales, GOE) are the special operations forces of the Spanish Army.

These units should not be confused with the similar-sounding Grupo Especial de Operaciones (GEO) and Grupos Operativos Especiales de Seguridad (GOES), two police forces, or the Spanish Navy's Unidad de Operaciones Especiales (UOE).

== Organization ==
The three Special Operations Groups are subordinated to the Special Operations Command (Mando de Operaciones Especiales - MOE).

Insignia	Group
	2nd Special Operations Group "Granada" (Grupo de Operaciones Especiales "Granada" II) disbanded in July 2020 to create the MOE Logistics Unit (Unidad Logística MOE)
	3rd Special Operations Group "Valencia" (Grupo de Operaciones Especiales "Valencia" III)
	4th Special Operations Group "Tercio del Ampurdán" (Grupo de Operaciones Especiales "Tercio del Ampurdán" IV)
	19th Special Operations Group "Maderal Oleaga" (Bandera de Operaciones Especiales "Maderal Oleaga" XIX)

== Units in 1989 ==
The Special Operations Groups were Ranger type units that specialized in counter-insurgency and guerrilla warfare tactics.

- 1st Special Operations Group "Ordenes Militares" (in Madrid)
- 2nd Special Operations Group "Santa Fé" (in Granada)
- 3rd Special Operations Group "Valencia" (in Alicante)
- 4th Special Operations Group "Almogávares" (in Barcelona)
- 5th Special Operations Group "San Marcial" (in Burgos)
- 6th Special Operations Group "La Victoria" (in A Coruña)
- 7th Special Operations Company (in Palma de Mallorca)
- 81st Special Operations Company (in Tenerife)
- 82nd Special Operations Company (in Las Palmas)
