= Tercio "Duque de Alba" No. 2 of the Legion =

Spanish infantry regiment

Coat of Arms of the Tercio "Duque de Alba" No. 2 of the Legion

The Tercio "Duque de Alba" No. 2 of the Legion" is an infantry regiment of the Spanish Legion. It is based in Ceuta and commands the 4th (Protected Infantry Bandera "Cristo de Lepanto" IV/2).
