= Spanish Legion =

Unit of the Spanish Army

- Legión Española
- Emblem of the Spanish Legion
- Founded: 20 September 1920; 106 years ago
- Country: Spain
- Branch: Army
- Type: Light infantry, shock troops
- Size: 8,000
- Garrison/HQ: Ronda (Málaga); Viator (Almeria); Melilla, Ceuta
- Nickname: Novios de la muerte ("Death's Grooms")
- Mottos: ¡Legionarios a luchar! ¡Legionarios a morir! ("Legionnaires, to fight! Legionnaires, to die!")
- March: Canción Del Legionario; (official quick march), Tercios Heroicos, Novio de la Muerte; (official hymn and slow march)
- Anniversaries: 20 September
- Engagements: Rif War; Asturian miners' strike of 1934; Spanish Civil War; Ifni War; Western Sahara conflict (1970–75); Yugoslav Wars; War in Afghanistan; Iraq War; Operation Libre Hidalgo (UNIFIL); Intervention in Iraq (2014–2021)

Commanders
- Notable commanders: José Millán-Astray; Francisco Franco

The Spanish Legion (Legión Española, La Legión and informally known as the Tercio), was first raised in the 1920s to serve as part of Spain's Army of Africa. The unit, which was established as the Spanish equivalent of the French Foreign Legion, was initially known as the Tercio de Extranjeros ("Tercio of foreigners") during the Rif War of 1921–1926. Over the years, the force's name has changed from Tercio de Extranjeros to Tercio de Marruecos ("Tercio of Morocco").

The Legion played a major role in the Nationalist forces in the Spanish Civil War. In post-Francoist Spain, the modern Legion is a specific unit that has Rapid Reaction Force capabilities within the Spanish Army. It has undertaken tours of duty in the Yugoslav Wars, Afghanistan, Iraq and UNIFIL.

The current Spanish Legion follows a long tradition of recruiting foreign soldiers to serve in Spain's armies, forming foreign regiments (Infantería de línea extranjera) such as the Regiment of Hibernia (the first three Irish regiments were raised in 1609 from Irishmen who fled Ireland in the wake of the Flight of the Earls; Jacobites known as the Wild geese founded Hibernia following the end of the Williamite War in Ireland ) or the Walloon Guards from Belgium..

== History ==
The Spanish Legion was formed by royal decree of King Alfonso XIII on 28 January 1920, with the Minister of War José Villalba Riquelme stating, "With the designation of Foreigners Regiment there will be created an armed military unit, whose recruits, uniform and regulations by which they should be governed will be set by the Minister of War". However, traditionally the Legion has held 20 September 1920, the day the first Legionnaire enlisted, as its founding date.

=== Predecessor ===
Historically there had been a "Spanish Foreign Legion" which preceded the modern Legion's formation in 1920. On 28 June 1835, the French government had decided to hand the French Foreign Legion over to the Spanish government in support of Queen Isabella's claim to the throne during the First Carlist War. The French Foreign Legion, with around 4,000 men, landed at Tarragona on 17 August 1835. This became the French Auxiliary Division until it was disbanded on 8 December 1838, when it had dropped to only 500 men.

=== Foundation ===
After conscript units were proving ineffective in North Africa, the Spanish military decided to create a corps of professional soldiers that would emulate the French Foreign Legion. A command which would be used exclusively to fight in Spain's colonial campaigns. At its foundation in January 1920, the new unit was named the Tercio de Extranjeros (Tercio of Foreigners). The use of Tercio, which is an old Spanish military term for an elite military unit employed in the 16th and 17th centuries, was used to evoke the era of Spain's military supremacy under the Habsburg monarchy. Despite its name, the Spanish Legion had a modern regimental structure not one akin to an historical tercio. Its first commanding officer was Lieutenant Colonel José Millán-Astray Terreros who always referred to his unit as ‘La Legión’. In 1925, the unit's title was changed to Tercio de Marruecos ("Tercio of Morocco"); often abbreviated to ‘El Tercio’. In 1937, at the height of the Spanish Civil War, it was renamed La Legión, the name by which it is still known today.

In the years of the original Tercio de Extranjeros, it is known there were Latin Americans, one Chinese, three Japanese, one Maltese, one Russian, both German & Austrian, one Italian, two Frenchmen, four Portuguese, one Belgian, unknown Filipino and one Spanish woman from Puerto Rico. In subsequent decades the number of overseas recruits has always remained low in comparison to the native Spanish contingent.

=== Early campaigns ===
The Spanish Legion's first major campaign was in Spanish North Africa. In 1920 Spain was facing a major rebellion in the Protectorate of Spanish Morocco, led by the able Rif leader Abd el-Krim. On 2 September 1920, King Alfonso XIII conferred command of the new regiment on Lieutenant Colonel of Infantry José Millán-Astray, chief proponent of its establishment. Millán-Astray was an able soldier but an eccentric and extreme personality. His style and attitude would become part of the mystique of the Legion.

On 20 September 1920 the first recruit joined the new Legion, a date which is now celebrated annually. The initial make-up of the regiment was a headquarters unit and three battalions (known as Banderas, lit. "banners" - another archaic 16th century term). Each battalion was in turn made up of a headquarters company, two rifle companies, and a machine gun company. The regiment's initial location was at the Cuartel del Rey en Ceuta on the Plaza de Colón. At its height, during the Spanish Civil War, the Legion consisted of 18 banderas, plus a tank bandera, an assault engineer bandera and a Special Operations Group. Banderas 12 to 18 were considered independent units and never served as part of the additional tercios into which the Legion was organised.

Francisco Franco was the Legion's second-in-command, concurrently commanding the 1st Bandera. The Legion fought in Spanish Morocco in the Rif War (to 1926). Together with the Regulares (Moorish colonial troops), the Legion made up the Spanish Army of Africa. Units of both the Legion and the Regulares were brought to Spain by the Republican government to help put down the Asturian Revolution of 1934.

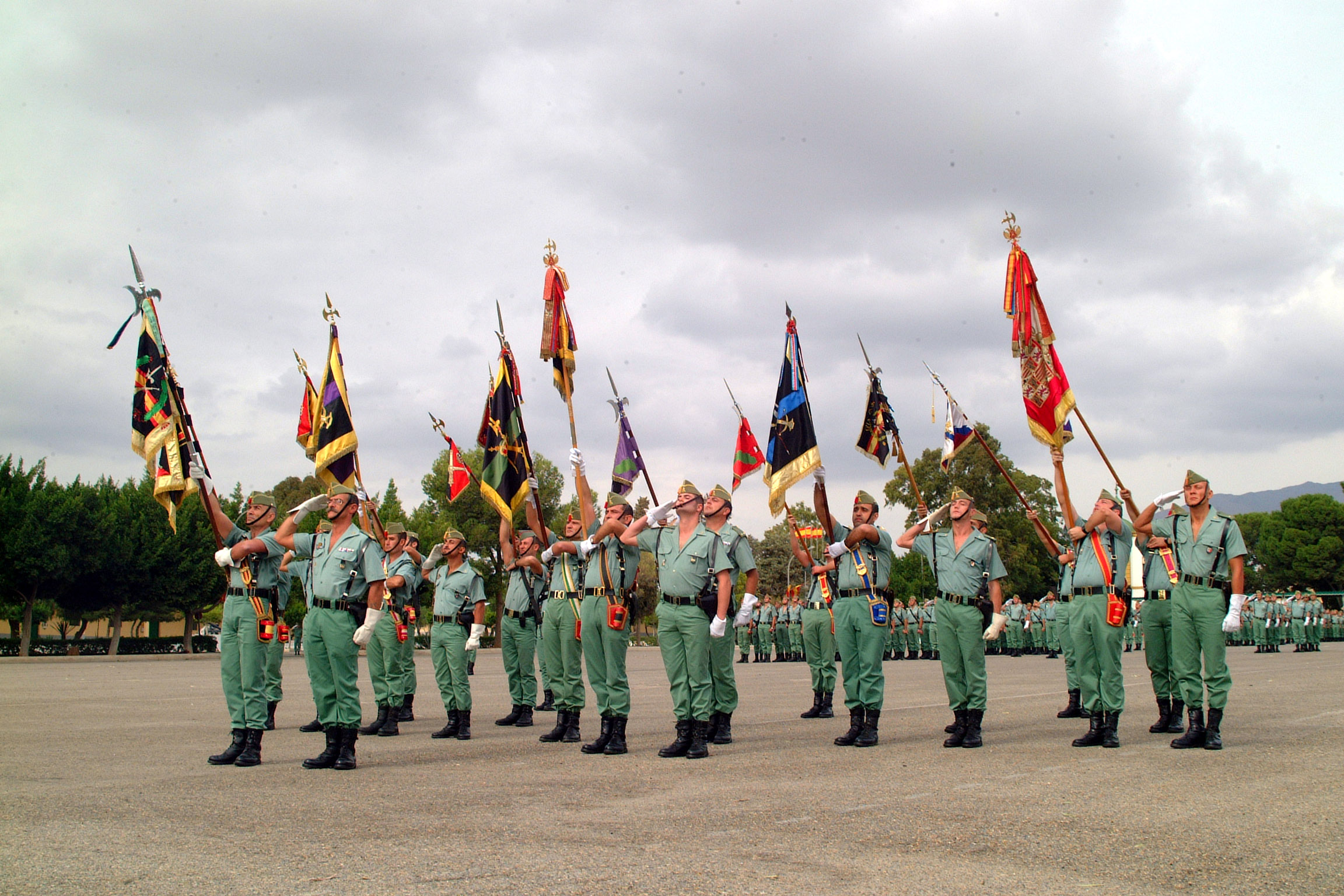
Colors of the Spanish Legion.

=== Civil War ===
Under the leadership of Lieutenant Colonel Juan Yagüe, the Army of Africa played an important part in the Spanish Civil War on the Nationalist side. The professionalism of the Legion and the Regulares gave the Nationalist troops a significant initial advantage over the less well trained Spanish Republican forces. The Army of Africa remained an elite spearhead until the expansion of the rebel armies after April 1937 led to the Legion and Moroccan units being distributed across several fronts.

=== After the Civil War ===
Following the Francoist victory in 1939, the Legion was reduced in size and returned to its bases in Spanish Morocco. In 1940, it was reorganized into three Tercios (regiments). The 4th Tercio of the Legion was established in 1950.

Emblems, coats of arms, and names of the Tercios:

1st Tercio, "Great Captain" Gonzalo Fernandez de Cordoba
2nd Tercio, "Fernando Alvarez de Toledo, Duke of Alba"
3rd Tercio, "Don Juan of Austria"
4th Tercio, "Alexander Farnese, Duke of Parma"

When Morocco gained its independence in 1956, the Legion continued in existence as part of the garrison of the remaining Spanish enclaves and territories in North Africa. The Legion fought Moroccan irregulars in the Ifni War in 1957–58.

On 17 June 1970, Legion units opened fire and killed between two and eleven demonstrators at the Zemla neighbourhood in El Aaiun, Spanish Sahara, modern day Western Sahara. The incident, which became known as the Zemla Intifada, had a significant influence on pushing the Sahrawi anticolonial movement into embarking on an armed struggle which continues, though Spain has long since abandoned the territory and handed it over to Morocco.

Through the course of the Legion's history, Spaniards (including natives of the colony of Spanish Guinea) have made up the majority of its members, with foreigners accounting for 25 percent or less. During the Rif War of the 1920s most of the foreigners serving with the Legion were Spanish-speaking Latin Americans.

== Modern legion ==
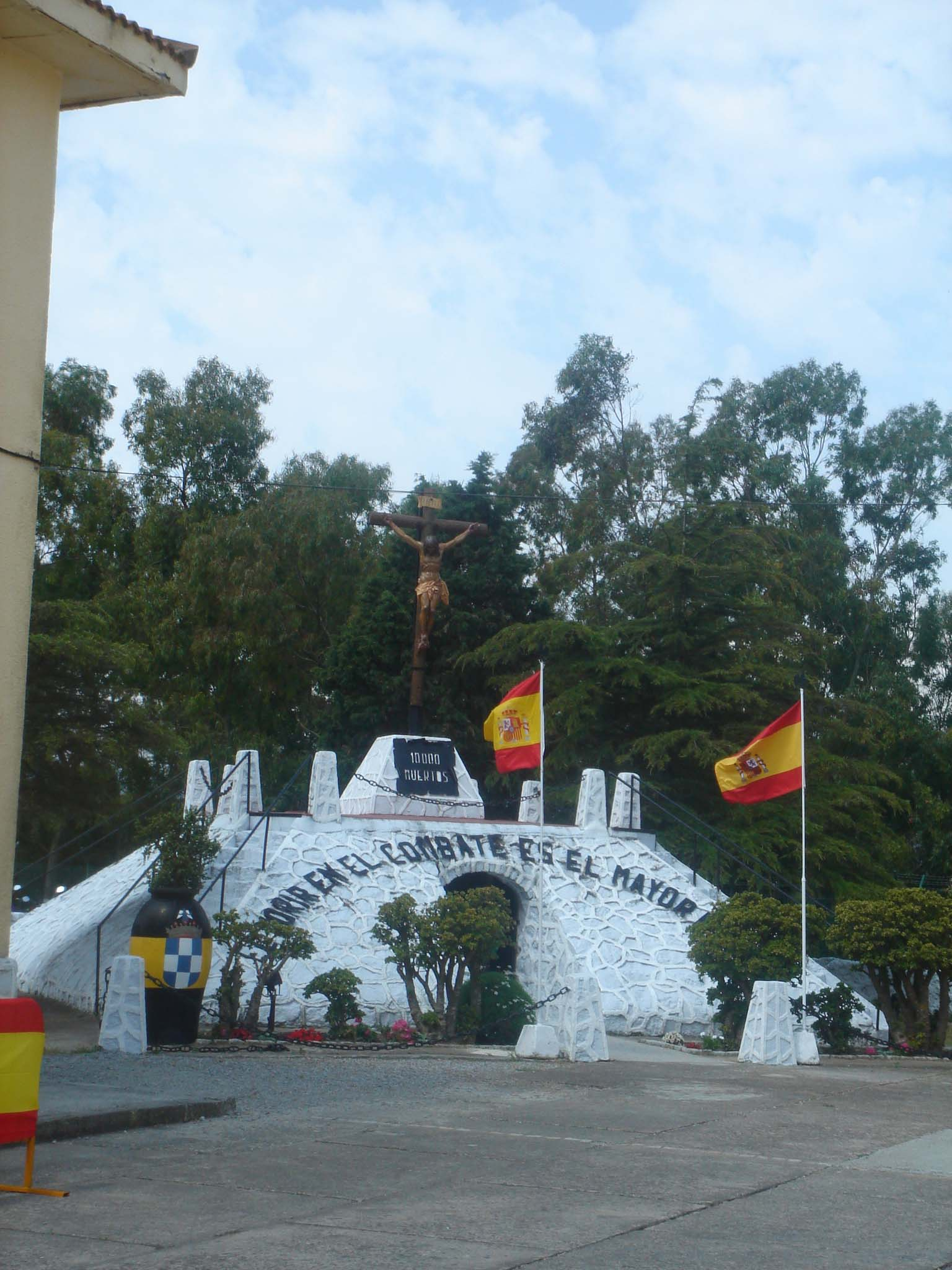
Ceuta garrison of the legion

In the 2000s, after the abandonment of conscription, the Spanish Legion once again accepted foreigners into service. Male and female native Spanish speakers, mostly from Central American and South American states, were included.

Today, acceptance to the Spanish Legion is based on the following criteria:

- Be a Spanish citizen or a citizens from former Spanish territories. Foreign recruits are required to have a valid Spanish residence permit.
- Be a citizen in good legal standing
- Not be deprived of civil rights
- Be at least 18 years of age and not be 29 on the day of joining boot camp.
- Be able to pass psychological, physical and medical evaluations

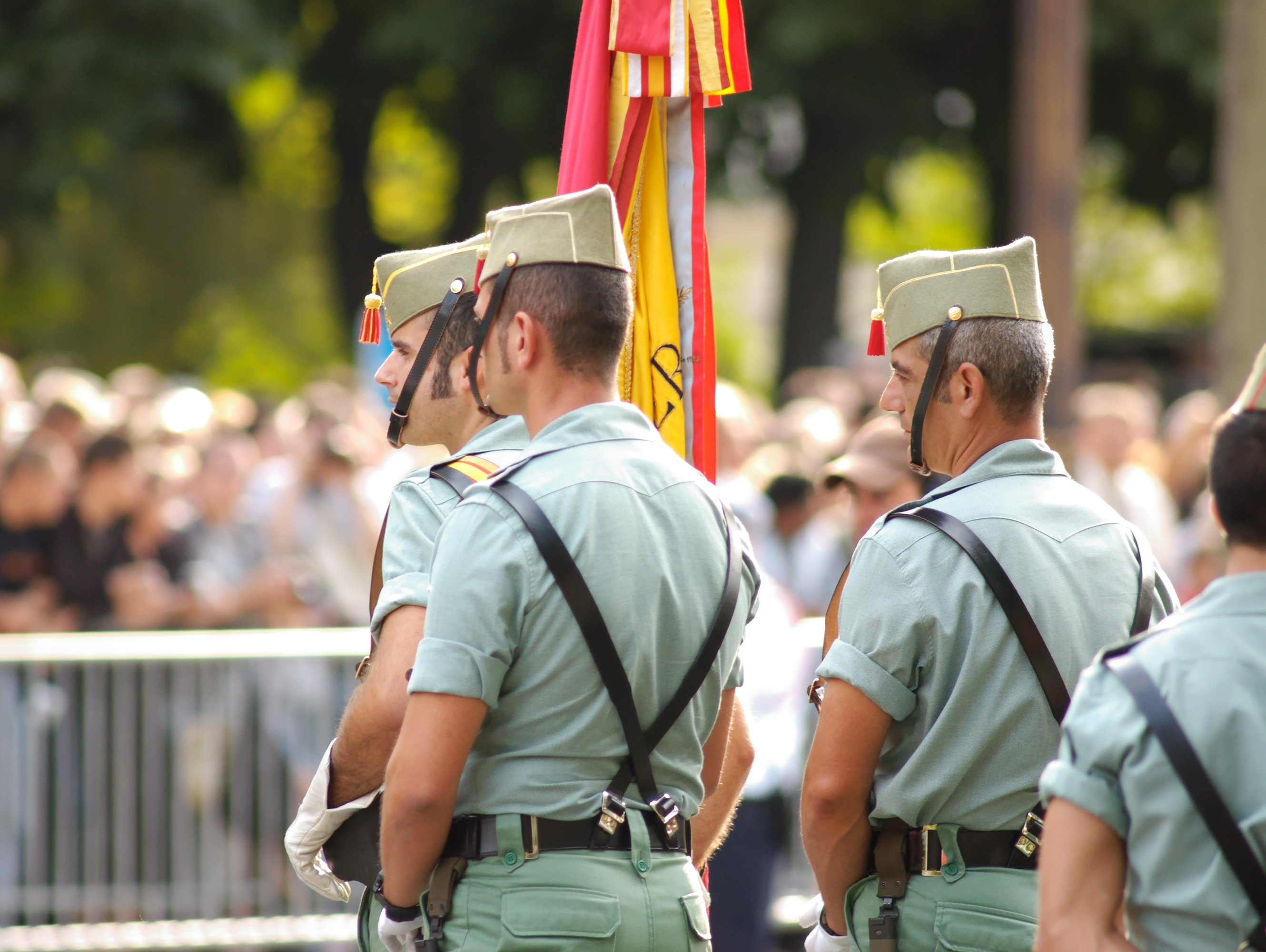
The Spanish Legion on the Bastille Day Military Parade in Paris (2007)

In recent years, the Spanish Legion was involved in Bosnia as part of the SFOR. It also took part in the Iraq War, deploying in Najaf alongside Salvadoran troops, until the new Spanish government of José Luis Rodríguez Zapatero fulfilled its electoral promises by withdrawing Spanish troops from Iraq. The legion units deployed in Iraq were involved in several operations against the insurgency. In 2005, the legion was deployed in Afghanistan as part of the NATO-led International Stabilisation Force (ISAF). In 2006, the 10th Bandera was sent to Southern Lebanon as part of United Nations' Operation UNIFIL.

=== Present role and deployment ===
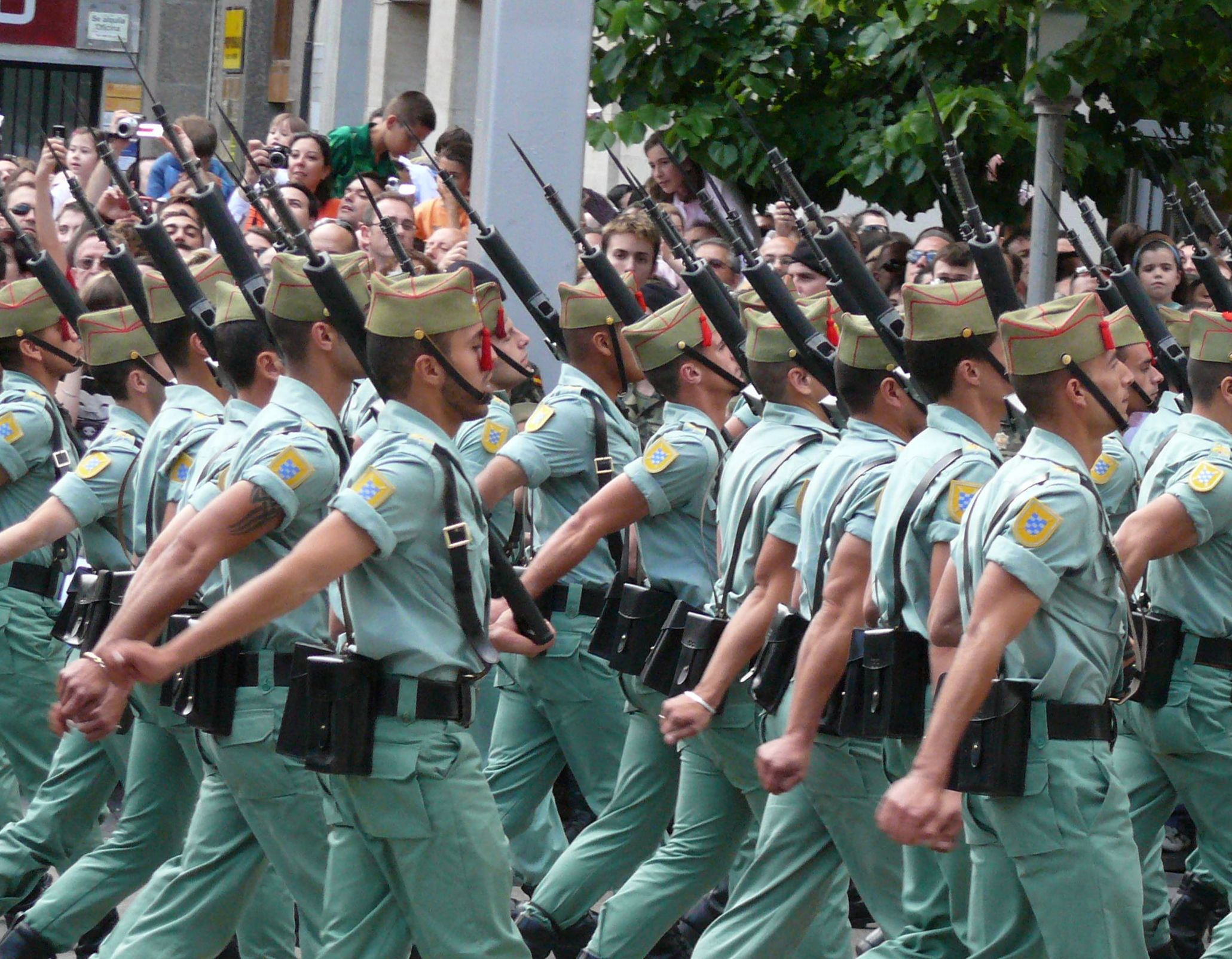
The legion on parade

The Spanish Legion is now mostly used in NATO peacekeeping missions. It has 5,000 soldiers in a Brigade of two Tercios (regiments) based in Ronda, Málaga (4th) and Viator, Almería (Andalusia) (3rd). Two other independent tercios are deployed in the Spanish African enclaves of Ceuta (2nd) and Melilla (1st) as part of their respective garrisons. The legion is directly controlled by the Spanish General Staff.

Although the detachment at Málaga was transferred away, each year a company of legionaries from one of the Tercios (regiments) returns to march in the Holy Week procession with the Christ of the Good Death, a life-size effigy of Christ Crucified, adopted by the legion as Patron in the 1920s. It also has its own confraternity with its home chapel located in this historic city, where veterans who served in this unit are counted among its membership. The Legion's detachments also take part in various Holy Week events nationwide, including its military band.

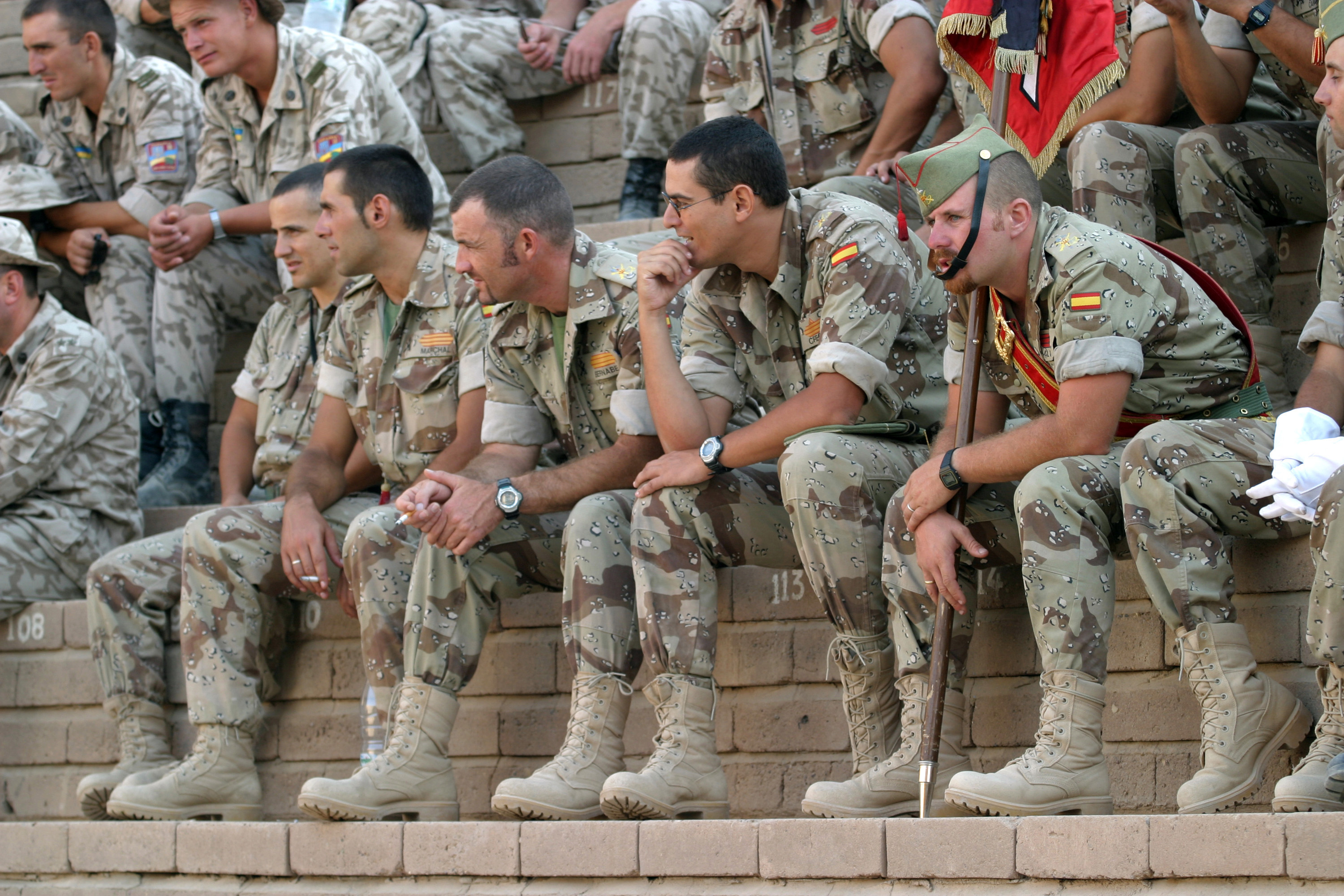
Legionnaires in Iraq

== Units constituting modern Spanish Legion ==
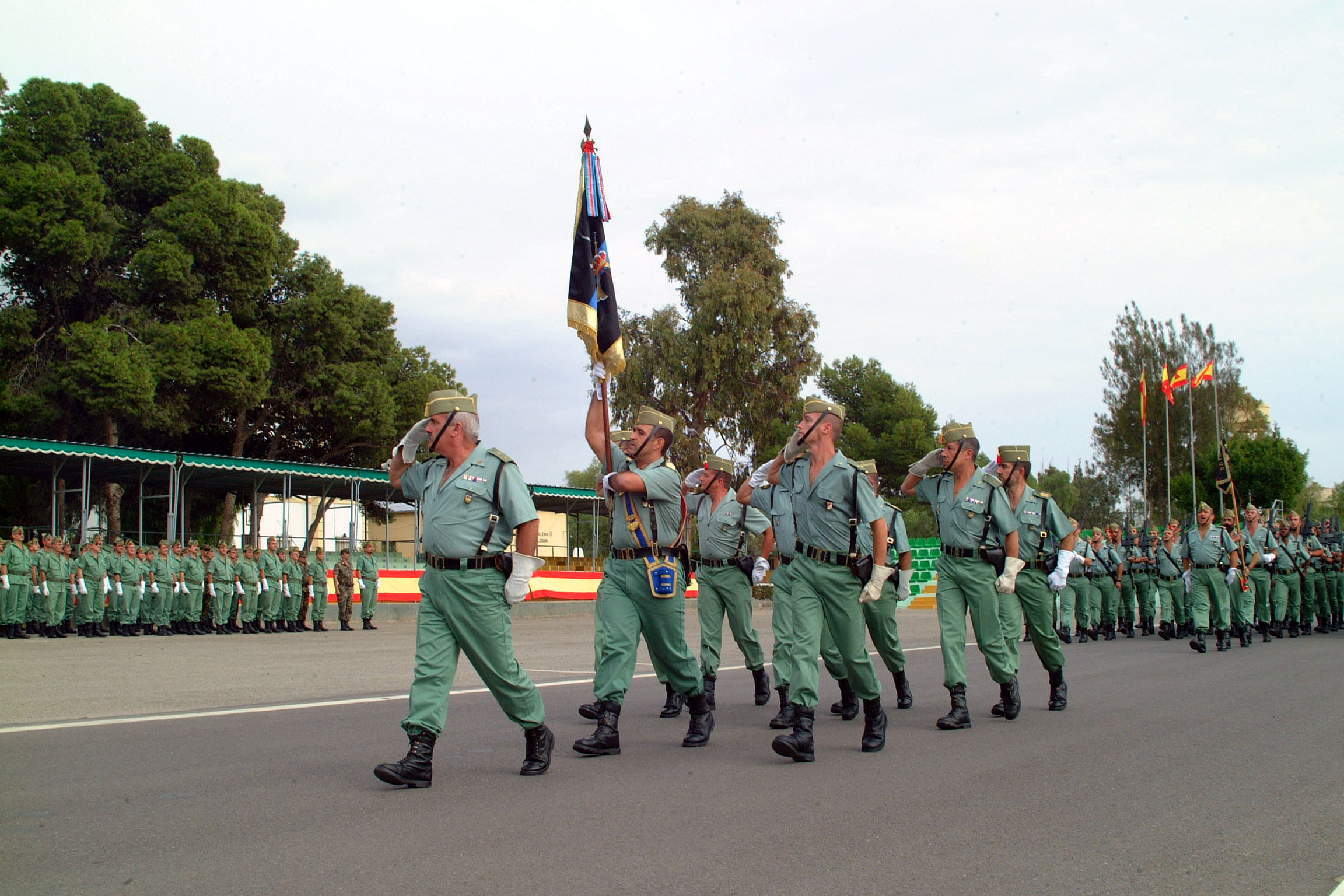
The Tercio "Alejandro Farnesio" No. 4 of the Legion

The currently active units of the Spanish Legion are:

- II Spanish Legion Brigade "Rey Alfonso XIII" in Viator
  - 2nd Spanish Legion Headquarters Bandera
  - 2nd Spanish Legion Light Armored Cavalry Group "Reyes Católicos"
  - 3rd Spanish Legion Tercio "Don Juan de Austria"
    - VII Spanish Legion Bandera "Valenzuela"
    - VIII Spanish Legion Bandera "Colón"
  - 4th Spanish Legion Tercio "Alejandro Farnesio"
    - X Spanish Legion Bandera "Millán Astray"
  - 2nd Spanish Legion Field Artillery Group
  - 2nd Spanish Legion Engineer Battalion
  - 2nd Spanish Legion Logistic Group

In other commands:

- 1st Spanish Legion Tercio "Gran Capitán"
  - I Spanish Legion Bandera "España"
- 2nd Spanish Legion Tercio "Duque de Alba"
  - IV Spanish Legion Bandera "Cristo de Lepanto"

=== Special Forces of the Spanish Legion ===
The legion has a special operations unit known as the Bandera de operaciones especiales de la legión (19th Legion Special Operations Battalion or BOEL). The members of this unit, who were (and still mostly are) volunteers from other banderas of the legion, received training in: SCUBA/Maritime Warfare, Arctic and Mountain Warfare, Sabotage and Demolitions, Parachute and HALO techniques, Long Range Reconnaissance, Counter-terrorism and CQB, Vehicle insertion, Sniping and SERE (Survival, Escape, Resistance and Evasion). Much of the training was undertaken at Fort Bragg (USA). In 2002 the BOEL was renamed 19th Special Operations Group "Maderal Oleaga" (GOE-XIX) and was moved to Alicante, and reported directly to Army HQ as part of the Special Operations Command, with recruitment now being in a national basis, with personnel assigned from various Army units. In 2019-20, the battalion returned to the Legion Command but is not part of the Legion Brigade, assigned as the Legion contribution to Army SpecOps.

- 19th Special Operations Group "Maderal Oleaga"

== Ranks ==
The military ranks and promotion conditions of the Spanish Legion are the same as those applicable to the remainder of the Spanish Army. Formerly the Legion had its own rank system for non-commissioned officers. The only modern difference is that soldiers (OR-1) in the Legion are referred to as "Caballeros Legionarios" (Legionary Gentlemen). Legionnaires consider this title as a distinction, earned through rigorous training and initiation tests.

== Basic training ==
Basic training lasts four months and takes place in Cáceres or Cádiz. It includes basic military skills, forced marches and a stringent assault course. After the second month, the recruit signs a 2 or 3-year contract. After finishing basic training the recruit joins one of the tercios, in there he receives further training, taking from 1 month to 10 months depending on the specialty assigned. This is the same process as in the rest of units in the Spanish army.

== Uniforms and equipment of the legion ==
=== Uniforms ===
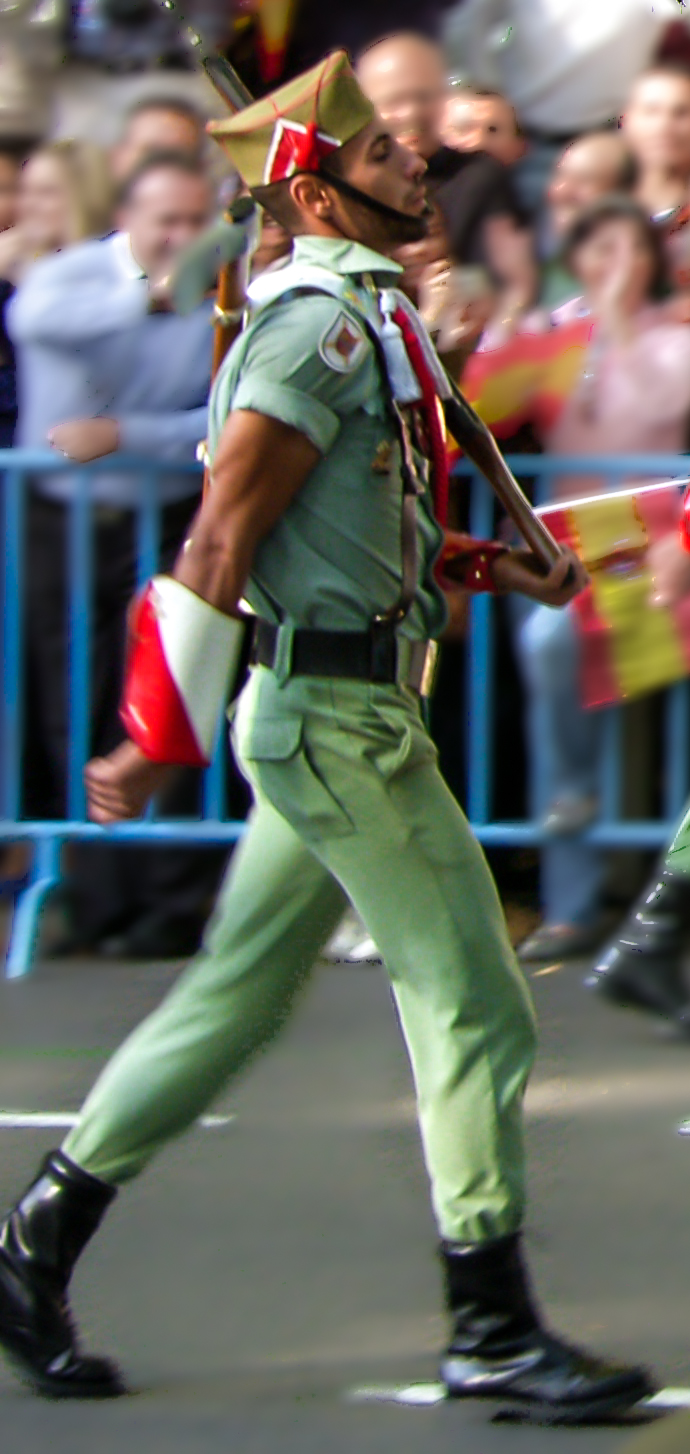
Legionaire on parade wearing the sage-green dress and the chapiri sidecap.

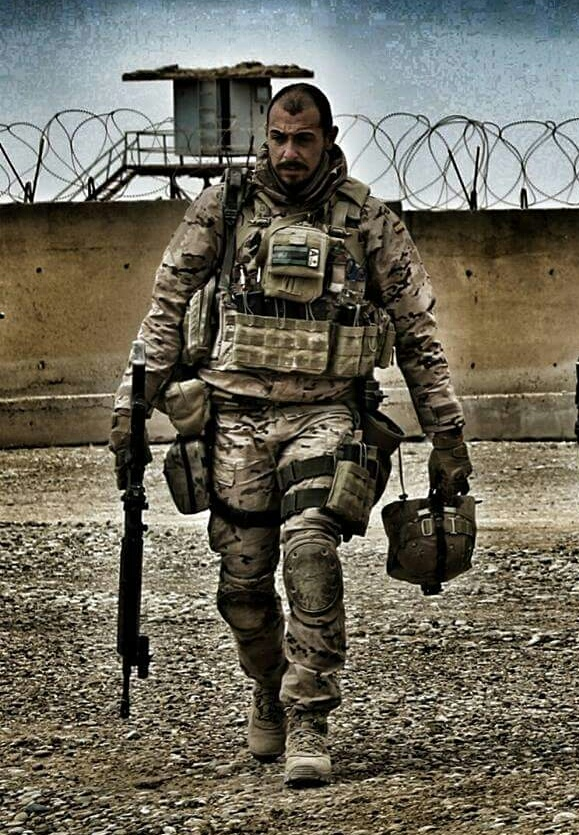
Legionaire in Iraq wearing Spanish army desert camouflage.

From its establishment the legion was noted for its plain and simple style of dress, in contrast to the colourful dress uniforms worn by the Peninsular regiments of the Spanish Army until the overthrow of the Monarchy in 1931. This was part of the cult of austerity favoured by a unit that considered itself on more or less continual active service.

The modern legion has the same camouflage dress for active service and ordinary duties as the rest of the Spanish Army but retains the unique, sage green Tropical Uniform for semi-formal barrack dress and as the basis of Legion parade uniform. Perhaps the most distinctive feature of the modern legion uniform is the khaki "gorrillo" cap or "chapiri", with red hanging tassel and piping.

Contrary to usual military practice, Legionaries are allowed to sport well-groomed full beards, evident tattoos, and are permitted to wear their uniforms, both traditional and service, open at the chest.

=== Equipment ===
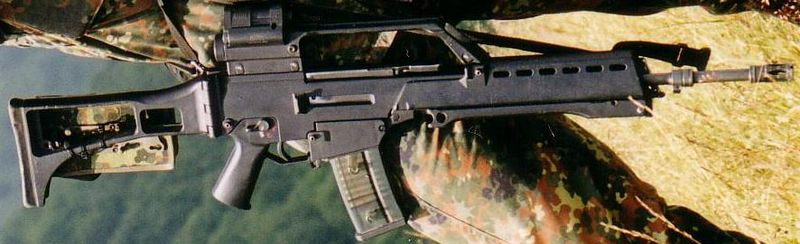
G36-E assault rifle.

The basic weapons used by the Legion are the same as those used by the rest of the Spanish Army. These include the G36-E rifle, its 40 mm grenade launcher modular attachment the AG36, the HK MG4 and MG3 machine guns, and the HK USP 9mm pistol.

Like the rest of the Army, the Legion makes use of crew served weapons such as the M2 Browning machine gun and the SB LAG 40 automatic grenade launcher on their armoured vehicles.

The Legions field artillery group mans L118 105mm Light Guns, Italian wheeled tank destroyers B1 Centauro also are used.

The Legion uses Land Rovers, Spanish-made BMR and VEC-M1, VAMTAC, URO trucks and other vehicles like foreign LMV or RG31.

== Esprit de corps ==
Millán-Astray provided the Legion with a distinctive spirit and symbolism intended to evoke Spain's Imperial and Christian traditions. For instance, the Legion adopted the regimental designation of tercio in memory of the 16th-century Spanish infantry formations that had toppled nations and terrorized the battlefields of Europe in the days of Charles V. Millán-Astray also revived the Spaniards' ancient feud with the Moors and portrayed his men first as crusaders on an extended Reconquista against Islamic civilization, and later as the saviours of Spain warding off Communism and democratic liberalism defeating the dangerous spectre of 'Eastern Atheism'.

As a tribute to the old Tercios the Legion coat of arms features, besides the crown, weapons used by the soldiers of these units - the musket, halberd and crossbow.

=== Traditions ===
The Legion's customs and traditions include the following:

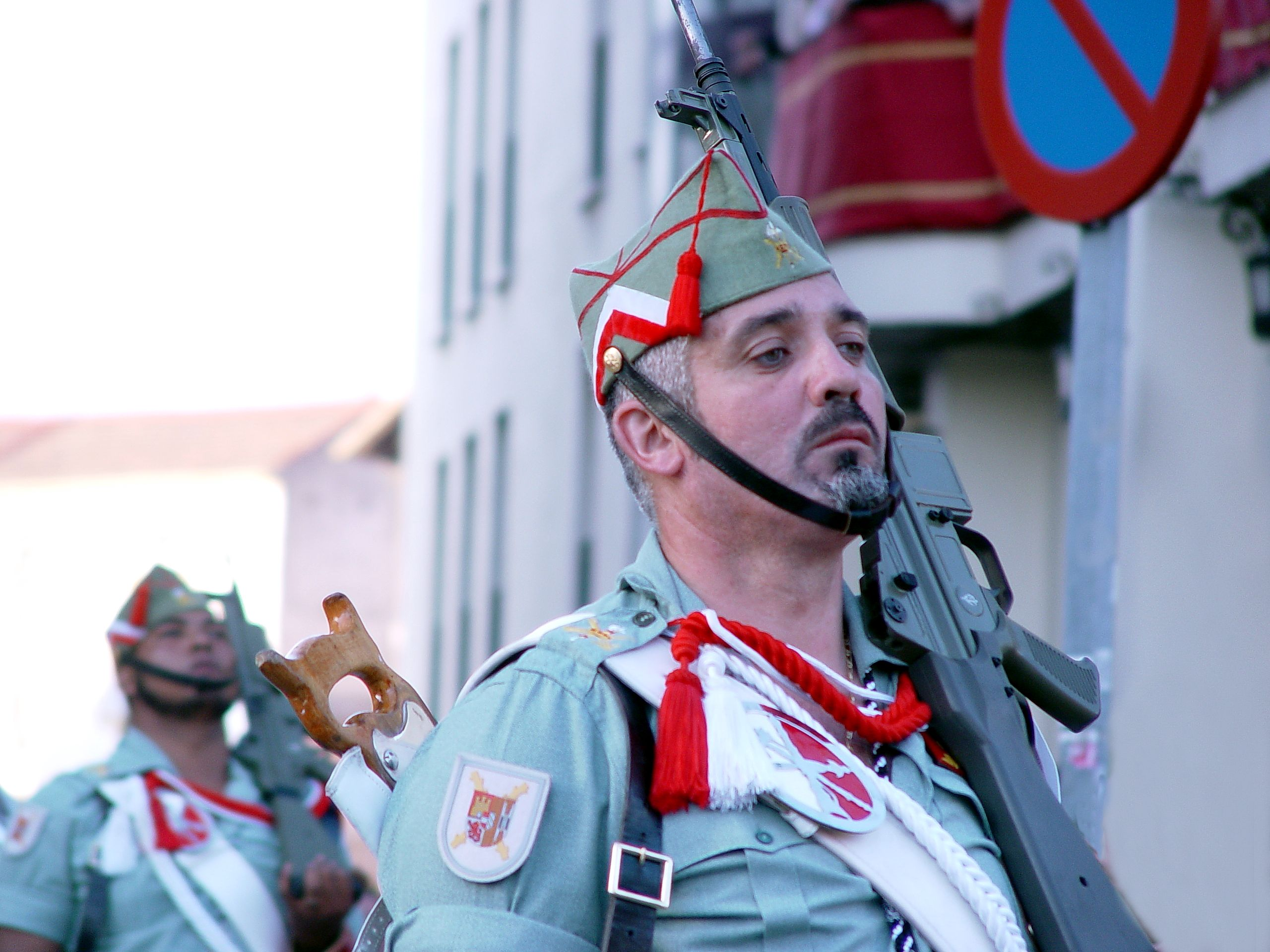
Legionaries on parade.

Legionnaires with effigy of Christ of the Good Death, Málaga.

- Its members, regardless of rank, are titled Caballero Legionario ("Legionary Gentleman"). When women are admitted, they are titled Dama Legionaria ("Legionary Lady").
- A "Mística Legionaria" (Legionary Spirit) (condensed in a twelve-point "es:Credo Legionario", or "Legionary Creed")
- Legionaries consider themselves Novios de la muerte ("bridegrooms of death"). This nickname is also the title of one of two official hymns of the Legion, the other one being La Canción del Legionario ("The Legionary's Song"). This comes from the first years of the corps, when it only admitted men.
- A Legionary in distress shouts ¡A mí la Legión! ("To me the Legion!"). Those within earshot are bound to help him, regardless of the circumstances. In practice, Legionaries are never supposed to abandon a comrade on the battlefield.
- The Legion's march step is faster than the Spanish military standard, being 160-180 steps per minute in contrast to the usual 90 steps per minute.
- During the Holy Week processions in Málaga, the Legionaries carry on their shoulders the image of the Christ of Good Death on Holy Thursday morning. Later that same afternoon, they accompany the procession through the streets of Málaga.
- Under the command of José Millán-Astray, the Legion's motto was ¡Viva la muerte! ("Long live death!") It fell into disuse after the death of Francisco Franco.

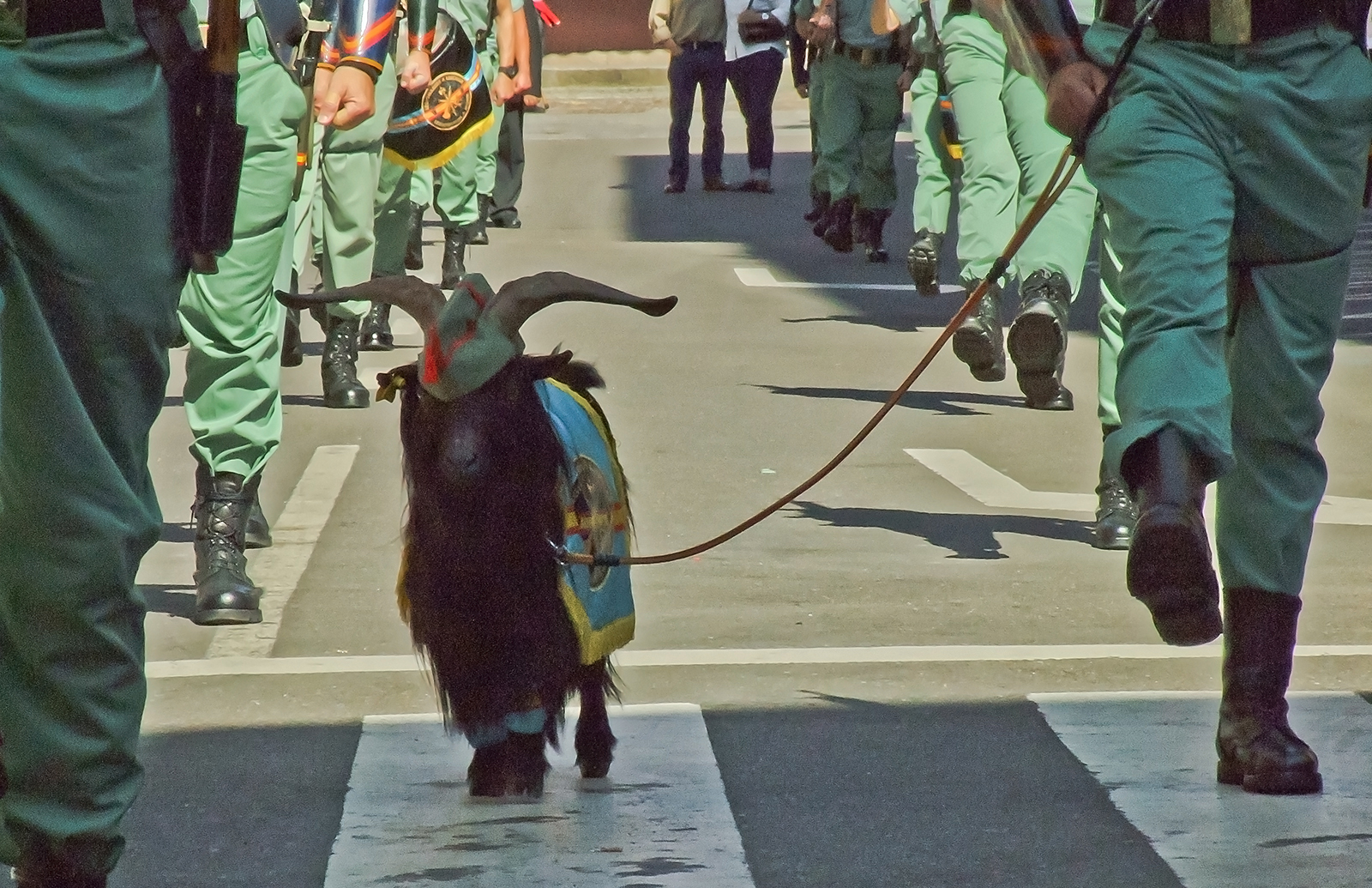
Goat mascot of the Spanish Legion

- The Legion has had several mascots during its history, such as monkeys, chickens, capercaillies, wild boars, barbary sheep (Spanish: arruis), bears, and parrots. The modern mascot is the Goat of the Spanish Legion. It usually appears at parades and ceremonies, wearing a Legion cap and accompanied by a Legionary, alongside the Legion's marker guard (gastadores), leading the marching troops.
- While throughout its history the Legion has been an essentially infantry force it has also included armoured, artillery and engineer units. During the 1920s and early 1930s, a squadron of mounted lanceros (lancers) formed part of the Legion and in 1982, a mounted section of the Polícia Militar de la Legión was formed to carry the traditional lances and pennants during Holy Week Processions in Málaga to continue the practice.
- The Military bands and Bugle bands of the Legion continue the unit's musical traditions since the 1920s. The bugle bands of the Legion, together with the Regulares, are the only such bands in the Spanish Armed Forces to never use the valved bugle but use the plain bugle instead. Together with the Parachute Light Infantry Brigade, they are also the only ones to use the small cornetín or the piccolo bugle, used for ordering commands and leading the bugle band in playing bugle calls, fanfares or marches. The medium cornetín is used by the other branches.
- Formerly, the Legion did its marchpasts in the same way as the rest of the Spanish Armed Forces. Today, all officers and the colour guards only do a hand salute and eyes right when marching past. When on the halt and giving full salutes, they only do a hand salute.

== Anthems and marches of the legion ==
=== Slow march ===
El Novio de la Muerte (Bridegroom of Death) is the unofficial hymn and regimental slow march of the Spanish Legion, composed in 1921 with words by Juan Costa set to music by Fidel Prado.

=== Regimental quick marches and official anthem ===
Composed in 1920, La Cancion del Legionario (The Legionnare's Song) is the official quick march and anthem of the Legion. It was composed by Modesto Romero and Infantry Commandant Emilio Guillén Pedemonti. It is played by the military bands and bugle bands of the Legion at the regulation 190 beats that it exclusively uses.

Before it became the legion's official march, Le Madelon and Tercios Heroicos (Heroic Tercios) by Francisco Calles and Antonio Soler were its official march past tunes.

== Some notable legionaries ==
The following is a list of Legionaries who have gained fame or notoriety inside or outside of the legion.

- Francisco Franco, general and dictator of Spain from 1939 to 1975. Founding deputy commander of the Spanish Legion in 1920, and later commander of the legion from 1923 to 1926.
- Prince Sixtus Henry of Bourbon-Parma (Spanish: Don Sixto Enrique de Borbón-Parma y Borbón-Busset), as Enrique Aranjuez in 1965. Carlist pretender to the Spanish throne.
- Luis Miguel Sánchez Cerro President of Peru from 1931 to 1933.
- José Millán-Astray, founder and first commander of the Spanish Legion, served until 1923.
- Enrique San Francisco, actor.
- Peter Kemp British Special Operations Executive agent, MI6 agent and writer.
- Pino Rauti, Italian politician
- Nacho Vidal. After leaving around 1994, he became a pornographic actor and director.

== See also ==
- Army of Africa (Spain)
- FAMET
- French Foreign Legion
- Israeli Mahal program
- List of Spanish Legionnaires
- Regulares
