= ESENGRA =

The Main Specialist School of La Graña (ESENGRA) and the Antonio Escaño Naval School, both based in Ferrol in north-western Spain, are the two Escuelas Militares (Naval Schools) where almost 100% of all of the sub-officers, technicians, sailors and other crew of the Spanish Navy receive their training.

== See also ==
- The Spanish Royal Academy of Naval Engineers (the first one of its kind was created in 1772 in Ferrol during the reign of Charles III of Spain)
- The Glenlee (also known as El Galatea, she was built in Glasgow, Scotland, in 1896. She was the Training Tall Ship for the Spanish Navy in Ferrol from 1922 till 1969, when the Spanish Navy sold her at auction. In the 1990s, she was bought and restored by the Clyde Maritime Trust to become one of the permanent attractions to visitors to Glasgow.)
- El Juan Sebastián Elcano (currently the Training Tall Ship for the Spanish Navy at the ENM).
- El Club Naval de Ferrol (originally designed for the recreation of the Spanish Navy personnel and their families posted to the naval station of Ferrol).
- Structure of the Spanish Navy in the 21st century
