= Tercio "Gran Capitán" No. 1 of the Legion =

Infantry regiment of the Spanish Legion

Coat of Arms of the Tercio "Gran Capitán" No. 1 of the Legion

The Tercio "Gran Capitán" No. 1 of the Legion is an infantry regiment of the Spanish Legion. The regiment is based in Melilla and includes the Mechanized Bandera "España" I/1, formerly the Mechanized Bandera "Cte. Franco" I/1.

The tercio is the senior unit of the Spanish Legion, tracing its lineage to the First Legion, formed in Taüima on 2 May 1925 with the 1st, 2nd, 3rd, and 4th banderas of the legion. The unit first saw combat in the Rif War, and played a key role in the Spanish Civil War. Elements of the unit participated in the United Nations Protection Force peacekeeping mission during the Bosnian War as part of the Malaga and Canarias Tactical Groups.
