= Tercio "Juan de Austria" No. 3 of the Legion =

The coat of arms.

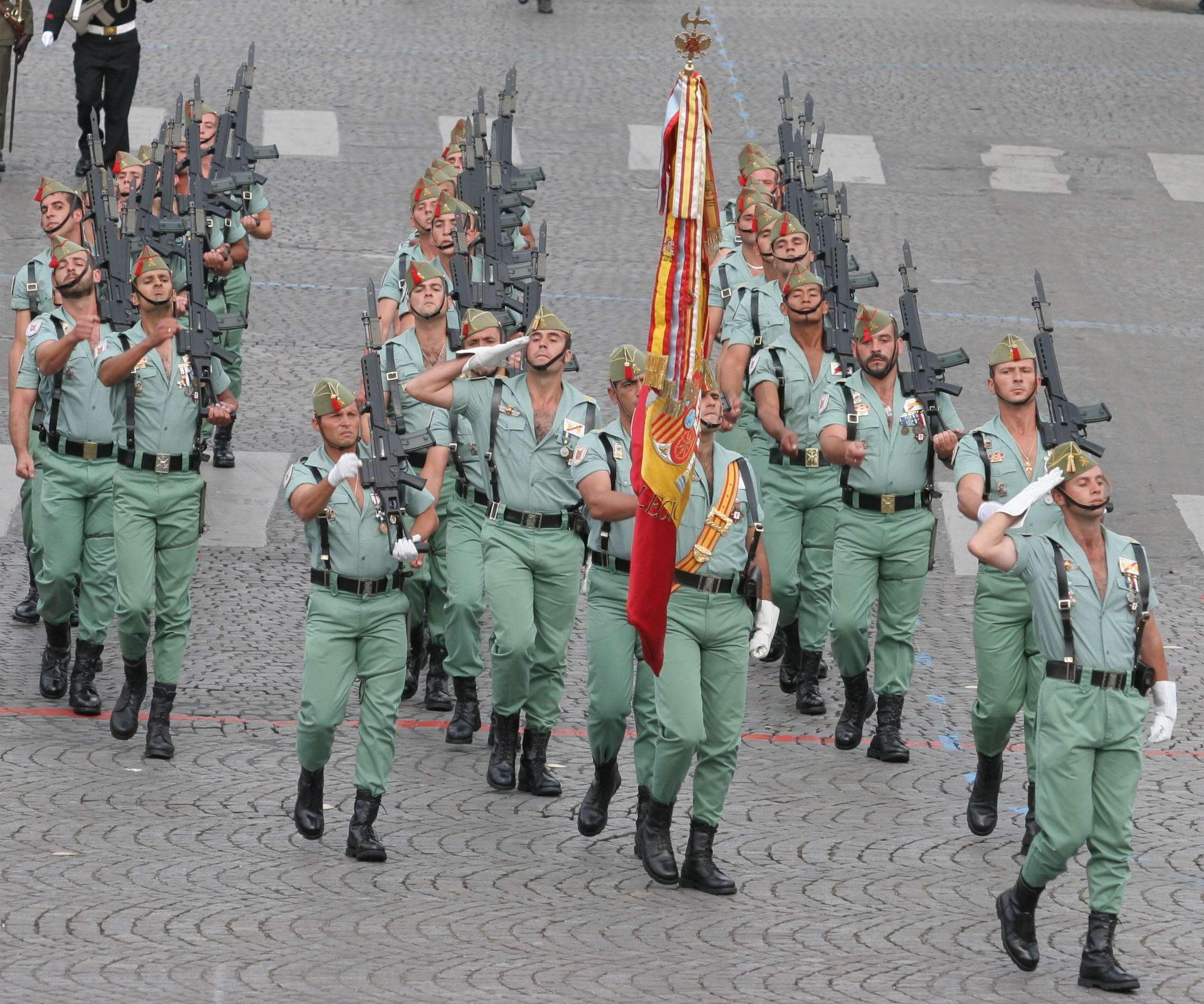
The 3rd Legion at the Bastille Day Military Parade.

The Tercio "Don Juan de Austria" 3º of the Legion is a regiment of the Spanish Legion. Its headquarters is in Almería. The Tercio "Juan de Austria" No. 3 of the Legion was raised on 1 January 1940 in Spanish Protectorate of Morocco. Today it consists of two battalions:

- Protected Infantry Bandera "Valenzuela" VII/3
- Protected Infantry Bandera "Colón" VIII/3

The 3rd Tercio "Don Giovanni d'Austria", of the Spanish Legion was created on 1º January 1940 in Larache in the Spanish Protectorate of Morocco, with the VII and IX Bandera from the 2nd Tercio "Duque de Alba", and from the VIII Bandera of the 1st Tercio "Gran Capitan".

In the magazine's list of January 1º 1940 included 85 officers, 111 non-commissioned officers and 2,523 soldiers for a total of 2719.

== Unit band ==
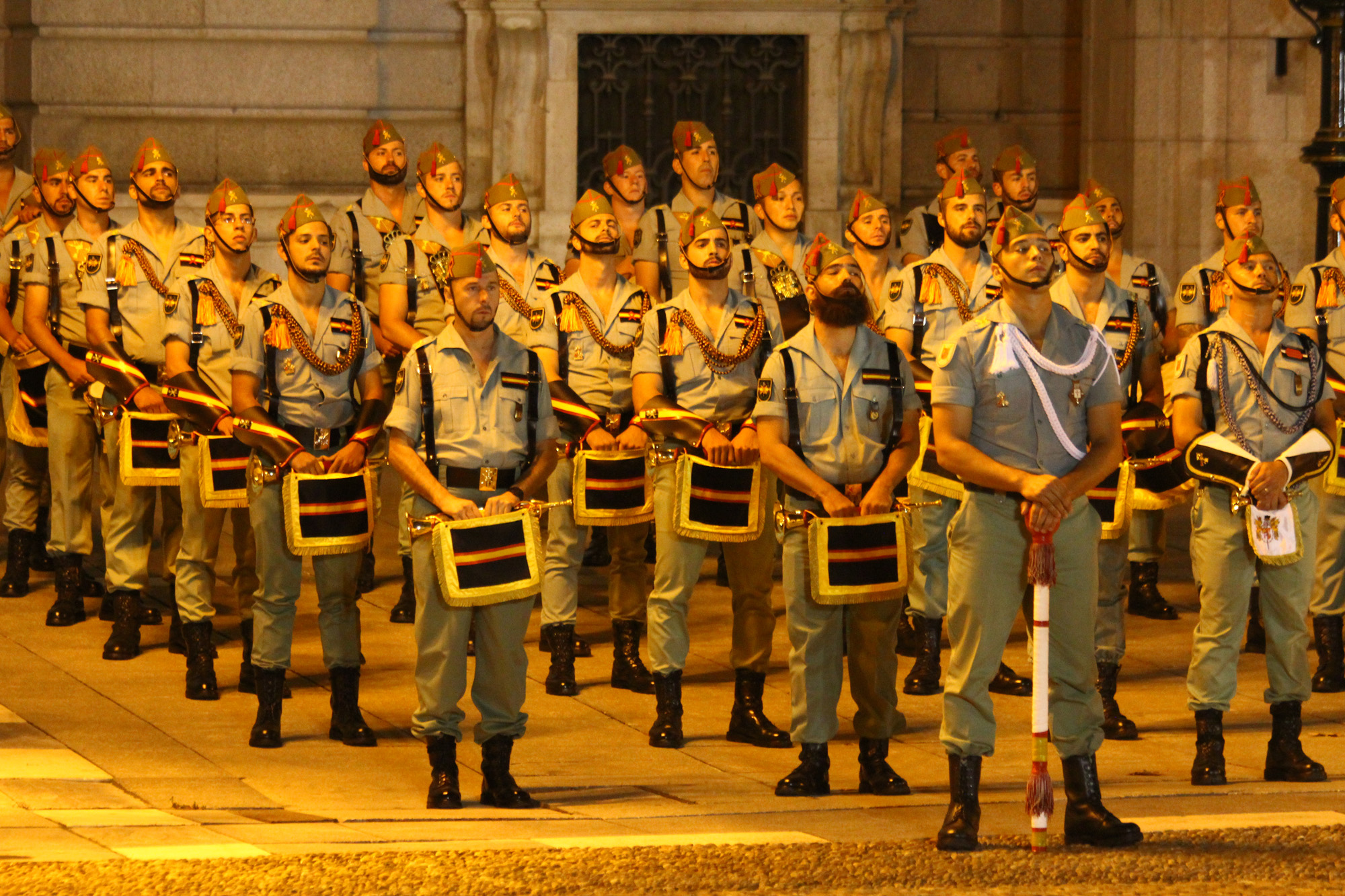
Members of the band during an evening parade.

The War Band of the King Alfonso XIII Light Infantry Brigade is the military band of the entire brigade, currently under the operational command of the 3rd legion and under the direction of Fernando Lizana Lozano. It was the first legionnaire musical formation, being created in 1920. During the Civil War, it was the largest music band that the Tercio has had in its entire history with almost 150 instrumentalists. In 1950, another band was formed when the IV Third was founded. In 1981, the band of the legion was transferred to Ronda and, finally, in 1995 the War Band was created in the Legion Brigade. In 1954, these formations were dissolved to create a single 90-place band attached to the second 3rd Legion, which had a long history until 1989, when it disappeared, becoming the band of the Military Government of Ceuta.

== Commanders ==
- Colonel Pedro María Andreu Gallardo (15 October 1995 – 15 October 1997)
- Colonel Manuel Julián García Moreno (15 October 1997 – 15 October 1999)
- Colonel Francisco Manuel Morala Albadalejo (15 October 1999 – 19 December 2001)
- Colonel Vicente Bataller Alventosa 19 December 2001 – 20 December 2003)
- Colonel Adolfo Orozco López (20 December 2003 – 19 December 2005)
- Colonel José Antonio Alonso Miranda (20 December 2006-December 2007)
- Colonel Pedro Perez Garcia (December 2007-December 2009)
- Colonel Jose Rodríguez García (December 2009 – Present)

== Gallery ==
Coat of Arms of the Spanish Legion Band.

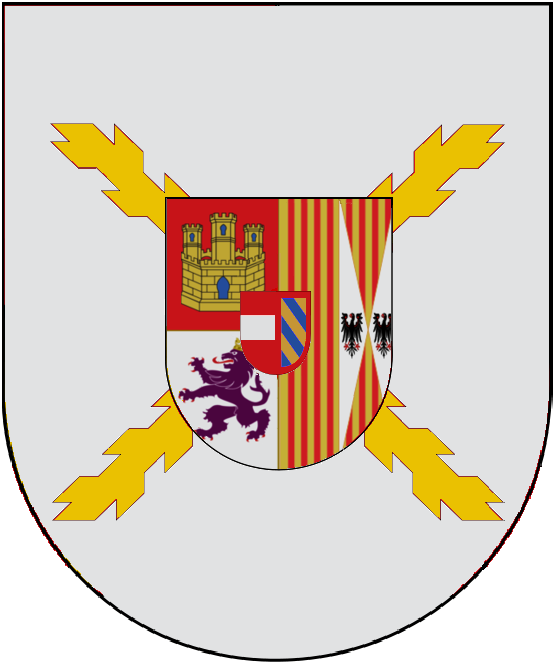
Heraldry of the John of Austria's Tercio

Emblem of the 3rd Spanish Legion
