= Viator =

Viator, Spain
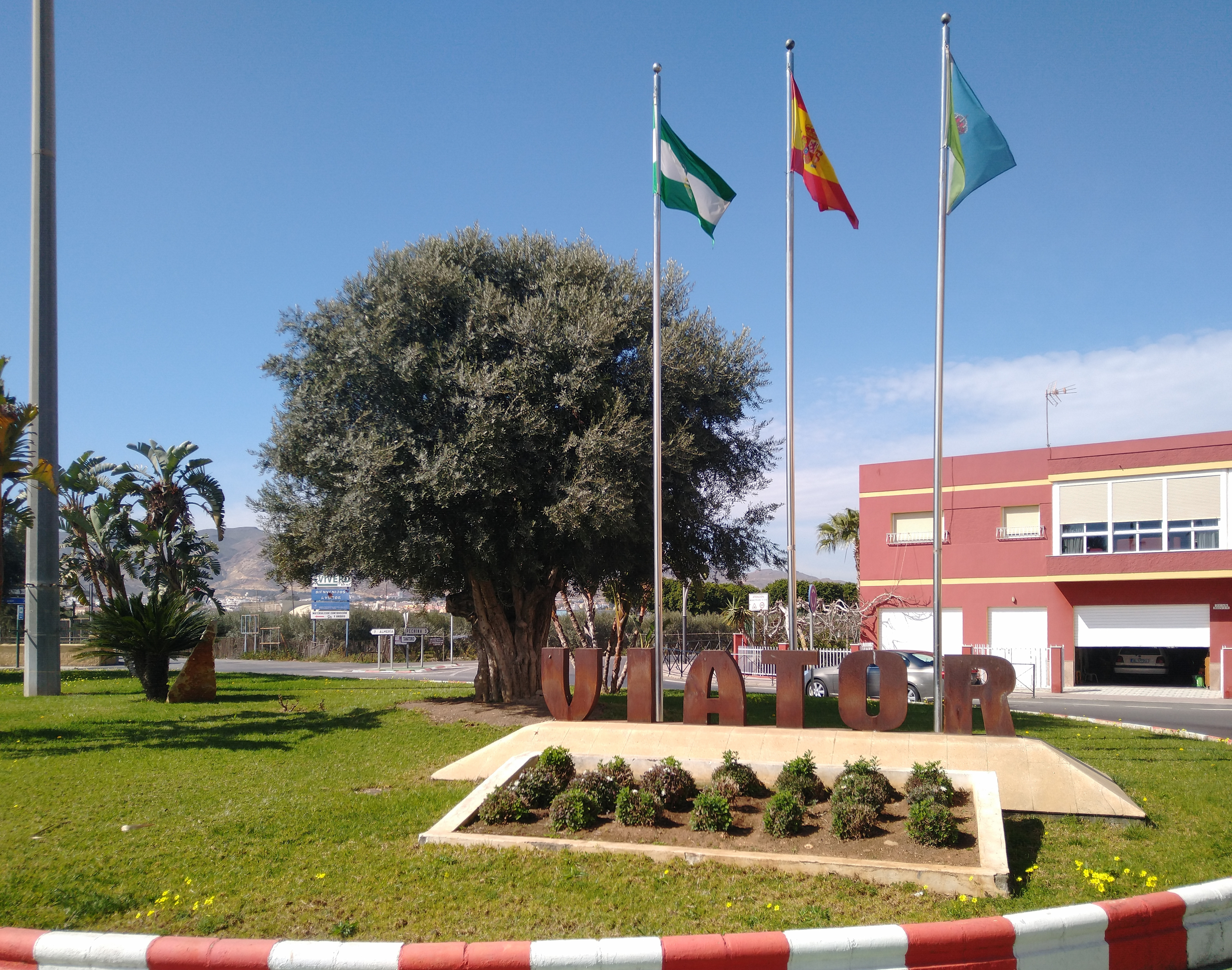
- View of Viator town

- Coat of arms

- Location within Province of Almería Location within Andalusia Location within Spain
- Coordinates: 36°53′N 2°25′W
- Country: Spain
- Community: Andalusia
- Municipality: Almería

Government
  - Mayor: Manuel Jesús Flores Malpica (PSOE)

Area
  - Total: 21 km^{2} (8.1 sq mi)
- Elevation: 95 m (312 ft)

Population (2025-01-01)
  - Total: 6,339
  - Density: 300/km^{2} (780/sq mi)
- Time zone: UTC+1 (CET)
  - Summer (DST): UTC+2 (CEST)

Viator is a municipality of Almería province, in the autonomous community of Andalusia, Spain. José Brocca lived here.

== Demographics ==
Historical population
Year	Pop.	±%
1999	3,493	—
2000	3,567	+2.1%
2001	3,634	+1.9%
2002	3,617	−0.5%
2003	3,793	+4.9%
2004	3,872	+2.1%
2005	3,950	+2.0%
Source: INE (Spain)

== See also ==
- List of municipalities in Almería
