= Tercio "Alejandro Farnesio" No. 4 of the Legion =

Coat of Arms of the Tercio "Alejandro Farnesio" No. 4 of the Legion

The Tercio "Alejandro Farnesio" No. 4 of the Legion is a regiment of the Spanish Legion. Its sole battalion is the Motorized Infantry Bandera "Millán Astray X. It was founded in 1950 and is currently based in Ronda.

== Commanders ==
- Colonel Enrique Gomariz de Robles (1 July 1996 - 1 December 2002)
- Colonel Luis Gómez Hortiguela Amillo (1 December 1998 - 17 December 2000)
- Colonel Vicente Díaz de Villegas Herrerías (17 December 2002 - 20 December 2000)
- Colonel José Manuel Muñoz Muñoz (20 December 2000 - 20 December 2002)
- Colonel Juan Bautista García Sánchez (20 December 2002 - 1 November 2004)
- Colonel Ángel Álvarez Jiménez (1 November 2004 - 18 December 2006)
- Colonel Ramón Prieto Oses (18 December 2006 - 20 December 2008)
- Colonel Miguel Martín Bernardi (20 December 2008 - Present)
