= Structure of the Spanish Army =

The structure of the Spanish Army as of April 2023 is as follows:

== Chief of the Army General Staff ==
The Chief of the Army General Staff heads the Spanish Army.

=== Army Headquarters ===
The Army Headquarters is made up of six organizations, which report directly to the Chief of the Army General Staff.

- Army Headquarters, in Madrid
  - Army General Staff
    - Command, headed by the Deputy Chief of the Army General Staff
    - Army General Staff Main Secretariat
    - Planning Division
    - Operations Division
    - Logistic Division
  - Cabinet of the Chief of Staff of the Army
  - Information Systems, Telecommunications and Technical Assistance Command
    - Technical Assistance Sub-directorate
    - Information Systems and Telecommunications Sub-directorate
      - Signal Regiment No. 22, in Pozuelo de Alarcón (National Signal Infrastructure)
        - Signal Battalion I/22, in Pozuelo de Alarcón
        - Signal Battalion II/22, in Pozuelo de Alarcón
        - Signal Battalion III/22, in Seville
        - Signal Battalion IV/22, in Barcelona
        - Signal Battalion V/22, in A Coruña
        - Signal Battalion VI/22, in Santa Cruz de Tenerife
    - Cyberspace and Electromagnetic Activities Sub-directorate
      - Electronic Warfare Regiment No. 32, in Dos Hermanas
        - Electronic Warfare Battalion I/32
        - Electronic Warfare Battalion II/32
        - Electronic Warfare Battalion III/32
    - Army Geographical Center, in Madrid
  - Military History and Culture Institute, in Madrid
    - Historical Studies Sub-directorate
    - Historical and Cultural Heritage Sub-directorate
    - Army Museum
    - Military History and Culture Centers
    - Military Archives
  - Army Legal Council
  - Army Intervention Delegate (Financial controlling, part of the Defense Main Intervention Office)
  - Infantry Regiment "Inmemorial del Rey" No. 1, in Madrid
    - Battalion "Guardia Vieja de Castilla" ("Old Guards of Castile")
    - Automobile Unit
    - Support and Security Unit
    - Music Unit
    - Services Unit

=== Operational Force ===
The Operational Force is made up of three organizations, which report directly to the Chief of the Army General Staff.

==== High Readiness Land Headquarters ====
The High Readiness Land Headquarters is one of NATOs Rapid Deployable Corps and headed by a three-star general.

- High Readiness Land Headquarters, in Valencia
  - Headquarters Battalion, in Bétera
  - Military Police Battalion I, in Bétera

==== Land Force ====
The Land Force is a higher command based in Seville, which is responsible for establishing, training and maintaining the operational units of the Spanish Army based in continental Spain. The command is headed by a three-star general and has four subordinate units:

- Land Force, in Seville
  - Land Force Headquarters, in Seville
  - Division "Castillejos", in Huesca
  - Division "San Marcial", in Burgos
  - Maneuver Support Command, in A Coruña
  - Cavalry Regiment "España" No. 11, in Zaragoza
    - Light Armored Cavalry Group "Lanceros de Borbón" I/11 (Centauro tank destroyers and VEC-M1 reconnaissance vehicles)
    - Light Armored Cavalry Group "Numancia" II/11 (Centauro tank destroyers and VEC-M1 reconnaissance vehicles)

===== Division "Castillejos" =====
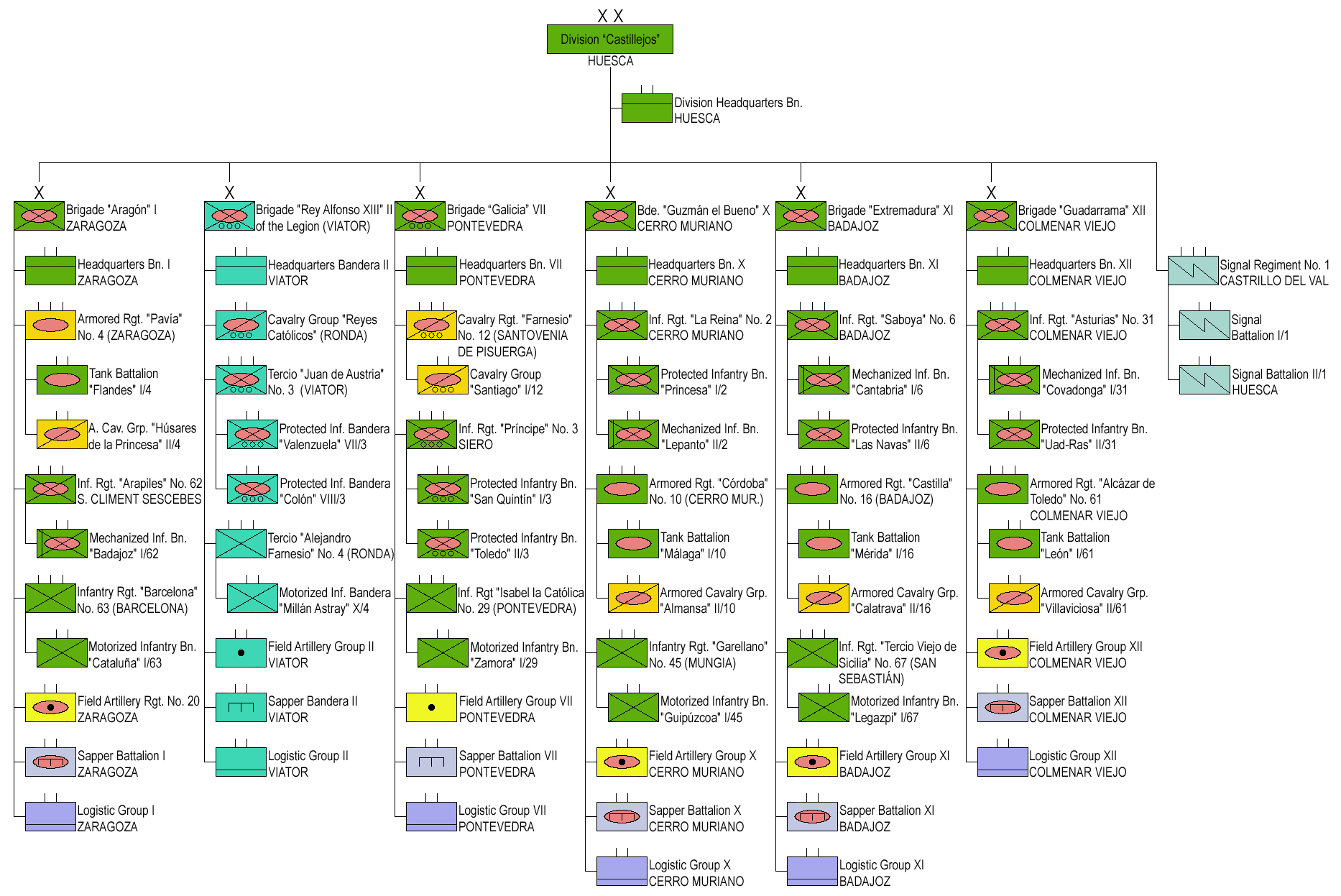
Division "Castillejos" organization 2020 (click to enlarge)

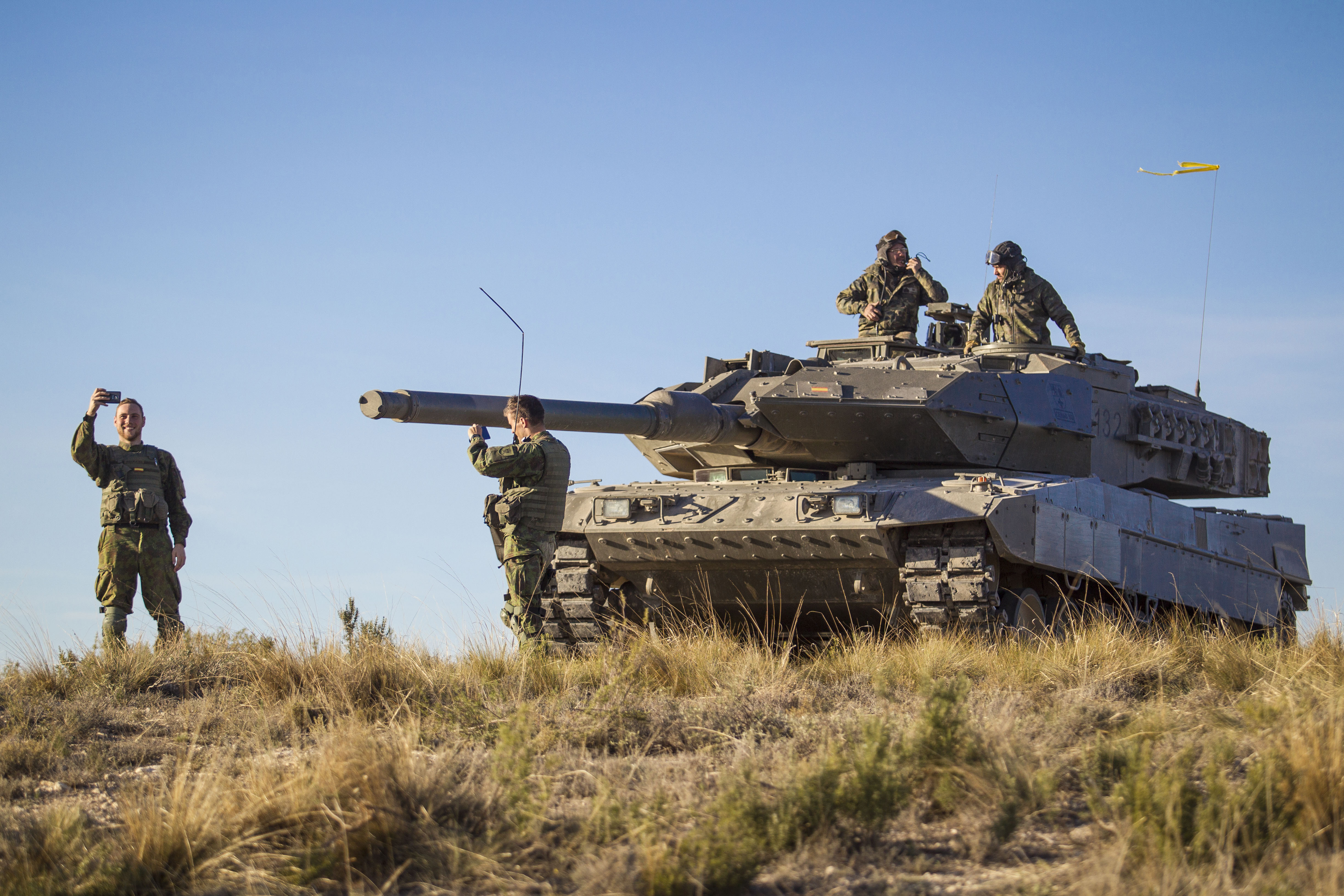
Leopard 2E tank during the Trident Juncture 2015 in Spain

The Division "Castillejos" is tasked to organize, equip, prepare and generate operational organizations for joint and combined operations. The division provides forces for NATO, United Nations and European Union missions.

- Division "Castillejos", in Huesca
  - Division "Castillejos" Headquarters Battalion, in Huesca
  - Signal Regiment No. 1, in Castrillo del Val
    - Signal Battalion I/1, in Castrillo del Val
    - Signal Battalion II/1, in Huesca

====== Brigade "Aragón" I ======
- Brigade "Aragón" I, in Zaragoza
  - Headquarters Battalion I, in Zaragoza
  - Armored Regiment "Pavia" No. 4, in Zaragoza
    - Tank Battalion "Flandes" I/4 (Leopard 2E tanks)
    - Armored Cavalry Group "Húsares de la Princesa" II/4 (Leopard 2E tanks and VEC-M1 reconnaissance vehicles)
  - Infantry Regiment "Arapiles" No. 62, in Sant Climent Sescebes
    - Mechanized Infantry Battalion "Badajoz" I/62 (Pizarro infantry fighting vehicles)
  - Infantry Regiment "Barcelona" No. 63, in Barcelona
    - Motorized Infantry Battalion "Cataluña" I/63
  - Field Artillery Regiment No. 20, in Zaragoza
    - Field Artillery Group I/20 (M109A5 self-propelled howitzers)
  - Sapper Battalion I, in Zaragoza
  - Logistic Group I, in Zaragoza

====== Brigade "King Alfonso XIII" II of the Legion ======
- Brigade "King Alfonso XIII" II of the Legion, in Viator
  - Headquarters Bandera II of the Legion, in Viator
  - Light Armored Cavalry Group "Reyes Católicos" II of the Legion, in Ronda (Centauro tank destroyers and VEC-M1 reconnaissance vehicles)
  - Tercio "Juan de Austria" No. 3 of the Legion, in Viator
    - Protected Infantry Bandera "Valenzuela" VII/3 (BMR-M1 armored personnel carriers)
    - Protected Infantry Bandera "Colón" VIII/3 (BMR-M1 armored personnel carriers)
  - Tercio "Alejandro Farnesio" No. 4 of the Legion, in Ronda
    - Motorized Infantry Bandera "Millán Astray" X/4
  - Field Artillery Group II of the Legion, in Viator (L-118A1 towed howitzers)
  - Sapper Bandera II of the Legion, in Viator
  - Logistic Group II of the Legion, in Viator

====== Brigade "Galicia" VII ======
- Brigade "Galicia" VII, in Pontevedra
  - Headquarters Battalion VII, in Figueirido
  - Cavalry Regiment "Farnesio" No. 12, in Santovenia de Pisuerga
    - Light Armored Cavalry Group "Santiago" I/12 (Centauro tank destroyers and VEC-M1 reconnaissance vehicles)
  - Infantry Regiment "Príncipe" No. 3, in Siero
    - Protected Infantry Battalion "San Quintín" I/3 (RG-31 Nyala and VAMTAC ST5 vehicles)
    - Protected Infantry Battalion "Toledo" II/3 (BMR-M1 armored personnel carriers)
  - Infantry Regiment "Isabel la Católica" No. 29, in Pontevedra
    - Motorized Infantry Battalion "Zamora" I/29
  - Field Artillery Group VII, in Pontevedra (L-118A1 towed howitzers)
  - Sapper Battalion VII, in Pontevedra
  - Logistic Group VII, in Pontevedra

====== Brigade "Guzmán el Bueno" X ======
- Brigade "Guzmán el Bueno" X, in Cerro Muriano
  - Headquarters Battalion X, in Cerro Muriano
  - Infantry Regiment "La Reina" No. 2, in Cerro Muriano
    - Protected Infantry Battalion "Princesa" I/2 (M113 armored personnel carriers)
    - Mechanized Infantry Battalion "Lepanto" II/2 (Pizarro infantry fighting vehicles)
  - Armored Regiment "Córdoba" No. 10, in Cerro Muriano
    - Tank Battalion "Málaga" I/10 (Leopard 2E tanks)
    - Armored Cavalry Group "Almansa" II/10 (Leopard 2E tanks and VEC-M1 reconnaissance vehicles)
  - Infantry Regiment "Garellano" No. 45, in Mungia
    - Motorized Infantry Battalion "Guipúzcoa" I/45
  - Field Artillery Group X, in Cerro Muriano (M109A5 self-propelled howitzers)
  - Sapper Battalion X, in Cerro Muriano
  - Logistic Group X, in Cerro Muriano

====== Brigade "Extremadura" XI ======
- Brigade "Extremadura" XI, in Badajoz
  - Headquarters Battalion XI, in Badajoz
  - Infantry Regiment "Saboya" No. 6, in Badajoz
    - Mechanized Infantry Battalion "Cantabria" I/6 (Pizarro infantry fighting vehicles)
    - Protected Infantry Battalion "Las Navas" II/6 (M113 armored personnel carriers)
  - Armored Regiment "Castilla" No. 16, in Badajoz
    - Tank Battalion "Mérida" I/16 (Leopard 2E tanks)
    - Armored Cavalry Group "Calatrava" II/16 (Leopard 2E tanks and VEC-M1 reconnaissance vehicles)
  - Infantry Regiment "Tercio Viejo de Sicilia" No. 67, in San Sebastián
    - Motorized Infantry Battalion "Legazpi" I/67
  - Field Artillery Group XI, in Badajoz (M109A5 self-propelled howitzers)
  - Sapper Battalion XI, in Badajoz
  - Logistic Group XI, in Badajoz

====== Brigade "Guadarrama" XII ======
- Brigade "Guadarrama" XII, in Madrid
  - Headquarters Battalion XII, in Madrid
  - Infantry Regiment "Asturias" No. 31, in Madrid
    - Mechanized Infantry Battalion "Covadonga" I/31 (Pizarro infantry fighting vehicles)
    - Protected Infantry Battalion "Uad-Ras" II/31 (M113 armored personnel carriers)
  - Armored Regiment "Alcázar de Toledo" No. 61, in Madrid
    - Tank Battalion "León" I/61 (Leopard 2E tanks)
    - Armored Cavalry Group "Villaviciosa" II/61 (Leopard 2E tanks and VEC-M1 reconnaissance vehicles)
  - Field Artillery Group XII, in Madrid (M109A5 self-propelled howitzers)
  - Sapper Battalion XII, in Madrid
  - Logistic Group XII, in Colmenar Viejo

===== Division "San Marcial" =====
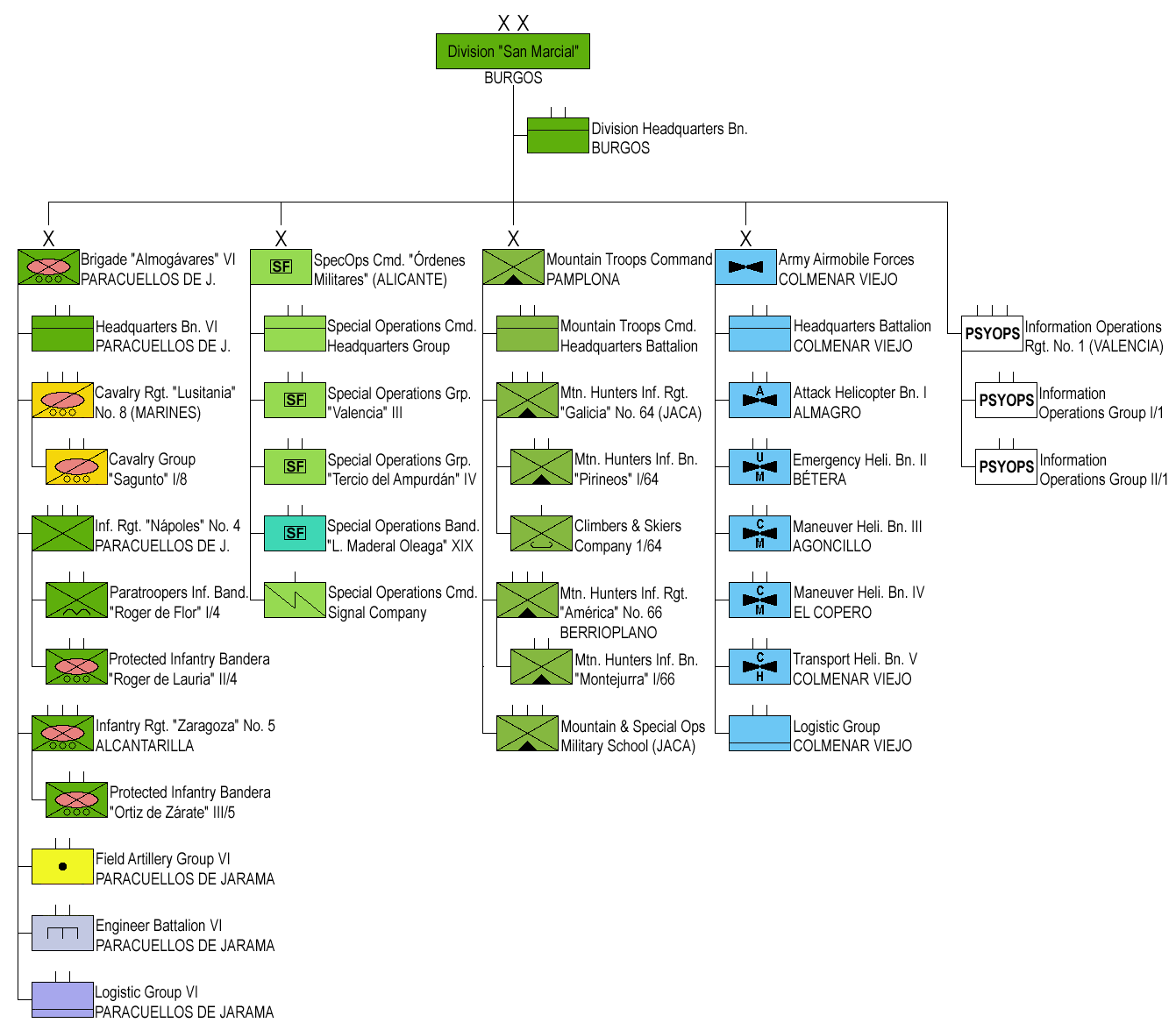
Division "San Marcial" organization 2020 (click to enlarge)

The Division "San Marcial" is tasked to organize, equip, prepare and generate high readiness operational organizations for joint and combined operations. The division provides forces for high intensity operations and Spanish national missions.

- Division "San Marcial", in Burgos
  - Division "San Marcial" Headquarters Battalion, in Burgos
  - Information Operations Regiment No. 1, in Valencia
    - Information Operations Group I/1
    - Information Operations Group II/1

====== Paratroopers Brigade "Almogávares" VI ======
- Paratroopers Brigade "Almogávares" VI, in Paracuellos de Jarama
  - Headquarters Battalion VI, in Paracuellos de Jarama
  - Cavalry Regiment "Lusitania" No. 8, in Marines
    - Light Armored Cavalry Group "Sagunto" I/8 (Centauro tank destroyers and VEC-M1 reconnaissance vehicles)
  - Paratroopers Infantry Regiment "Nápoles" No. 4, in Paracuellos de Jarama
    - Paratroopers Infantry Bandera "Roger de Flor" I/4
    - Protected Infantry Bandera "Roger de Lauria" II/4 (RG-31 Nyala and VAMTAC ST5 vehicles)
  - Infantry Regiment "Zaragoza" No. 5, in Alcantarilla
    - Protected Infantry Bandera "Ortiz de Zárate" III/5 (BMR-M1 armored personnel carriers)
  - Field Artillery Group VI, in Paracuellos de Jarama (L-118A1 towed howitzers)
  - Engineer Battalion VI, in Paracuellos de Jarama
  - Logistic Group VI, in Paracuellos de Jarama

====== Special Operations Command "Órdenes Militares" ======
- Special Operations Command "Órdenes Militares", in Alicante
  - Special Operations Command Headquarters Group, in Alicante
  - Special Operations Group "Valencia" III, in Alicante
  - Special Operations Group "Tercio del Ampurdán" IV, in Alicante
  - Special Operations Bandera "Legionario Maderal Oleaga" XIX of the Legion, in Alicante
  - Special Operations Command Logistic Unit, in Alicante
  - Special Operations Command Signal Company, in Alicante

====== Mountain Troops Command "Roncesvalles" ======
- Mountain Troops Command "Roncesvalles", in Pamplona
  - Headquarters Battalion, in Pamplona
  - Mountain Hunters Infantry Regiment "Galicia" No. 64, in Jaca
    - Mountain Hunters Battalion "Pirineos" I/64 (Bv 206s armored vehicles)
    - Climbers and Skiers Company 1/64
  - Mountain Hunters Infantry Regiment "América" No. 66, in Berrioplano
    - Mountain Hunters Battalion "Montejurra" I/66 (Bv 206s armored vehicles)
  - Mountain and Special Operations Military School, in Jaca

====== Army Airmobile Forces ======
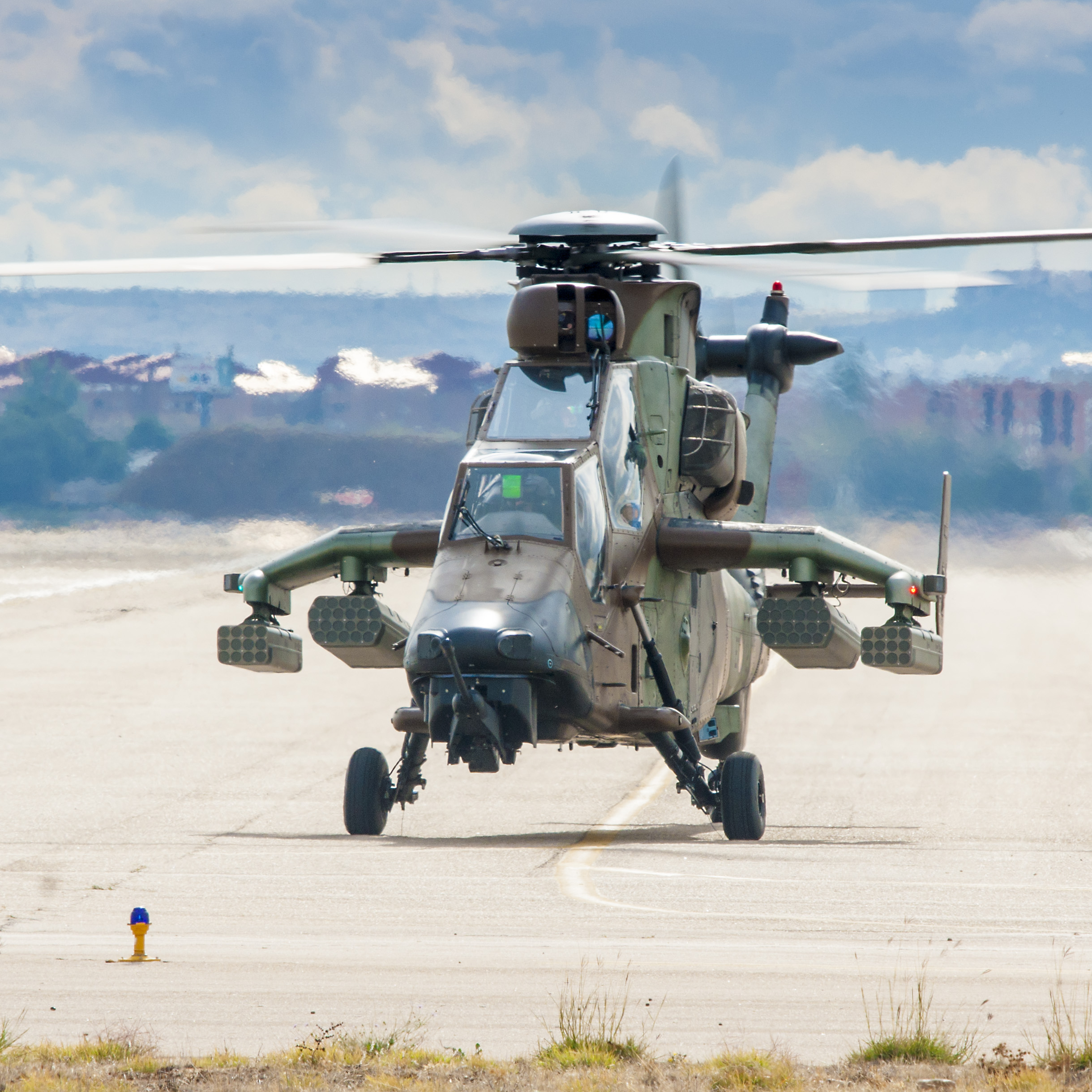
Attack Helicopter Battalion I Tiger HAD attack helicopter

- Army Airmobile Forces, in Colmenar Viejo
  - Army Airmobile Forces Headquarters Battalion, in Colmenar Viejo
  - Attack Helicopter Battalion I, in Almagro (Tiger HAD)
  - Emergency Helicopter Battalion II, in Bétera and Colmenar Viejo (AS532 UL Cougar)
  - Maneuver Helicopter Battalion III, in Agoncillo (NH90 TTH)
  - Maneuver Helicopter Battalion IV, in El Copero (AS332 B1 Super Puma)
  - Transport Helicopter Battalion V, in Colmenar Viejo, (CH-47F Chinook)
  - Army Airmobile Forces Logistic Group, in Colmenar Viejo
  - Melilla Helicopter Detachment, in Melilla

===== Maneuver Support Command =====
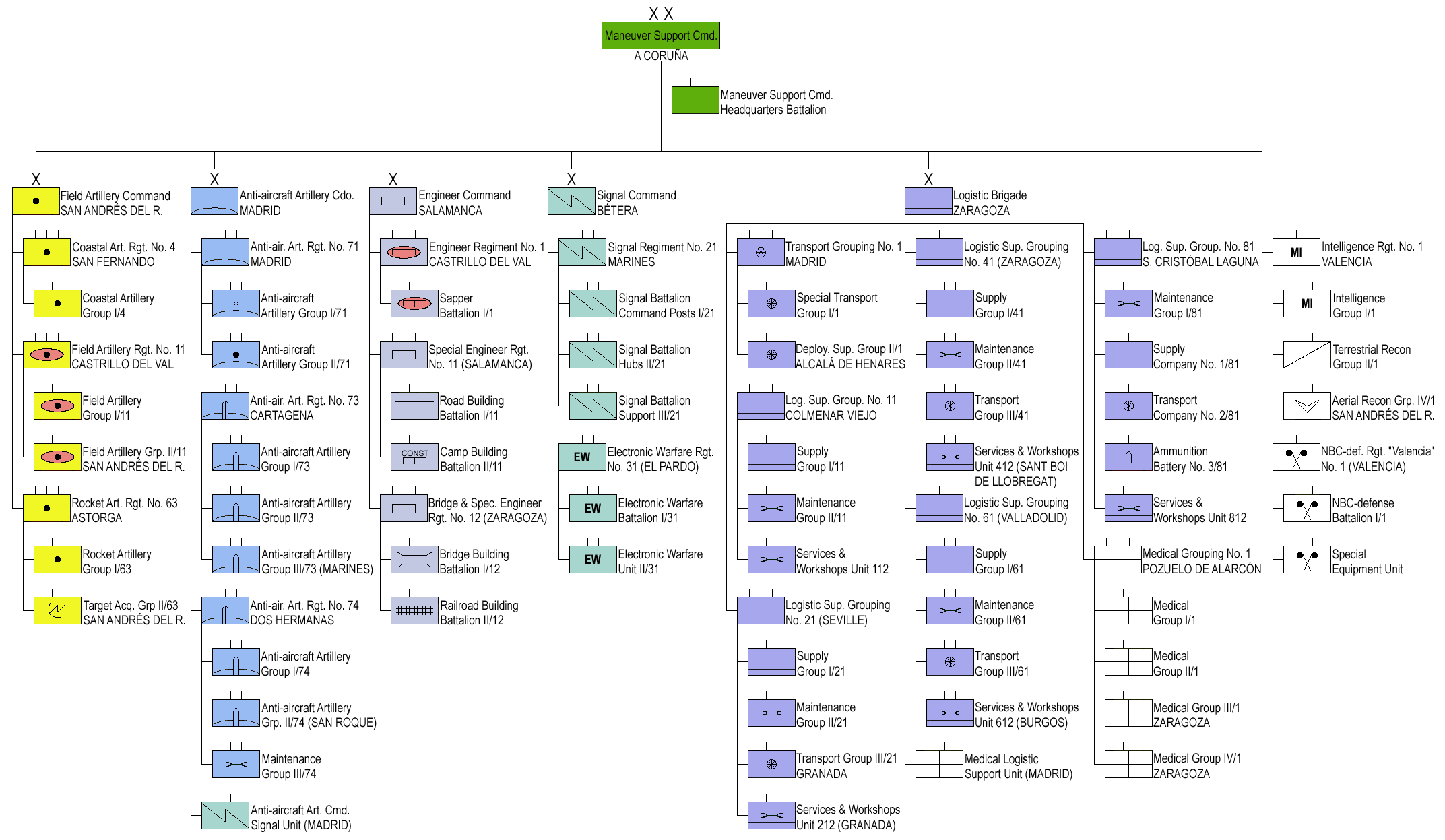
Maneuver Support Command organization 2020 (click to enlarge)

The Maneuver Support Command is tasked to organize, equip, prepare and generate operational combat support and combat logistic support organizations for joint and combined operations.

- Maneuver Support Command, in A Coruña
  - Maneuver Support Command Headquarters Battalion, in A Coruña
  - Intelligence Regiment No. 1, in Valencia
    - Intelligence Group I/1
    - Terrestrial Reconnaissance Group II/1
    - Aerial Reconnaissance Group IV/1 (IAI Searcher MK II J and RQ-11 Raven Unmanned Aerial Vehicles), in San Andrés del Rabanedo
  - NBC-defense Regiment "Valencia" No. 1, in Valencia
    - NBC-defense Battalion I/1
    - Special Equipment Unit

====== Field Artillery Command ======
- Field Artillery Command, in San Andrés del Rabanedo
  - Coastal Artillery Regiment No. 4, in San Fernando
    - Coastal Artillery Group I/4 (155/52 APU (V07) towed howitzers)
  - Field Artillery Regiment No. 11, in Castrillo del Val
    - Field Artillery Group I/11 (M109A5 self-propelled howitzers)
    - Field Artillery Group II/11 (M109A5 self-propelled howitzers), in San Andrés del Rabanedo
  - Rocket Artillery Regiment No. 63, in Astorga
    - Rocket Artillery Group I/63 (155/52 APU-SIAC towed howitzers - to be replaced with PULS multiple rocket launchers)
    - Target Acquisition Group II/63 (ARTHUR and AN/TPQ-36 artillery fire locating radars and IAI Searcher MK II J drones), in San Andrés del Rabanedo

====== Anti-aircraft Artillery Command ======
- Anti-aircraft Artillery Command in Madrid
  - Anti-aircraft Artillery Regiment No. 71, in Madrid
    - Anti-aircraft Artillery Group I/71 (Mistral surface-to-air missiles)
    - Anti-aircraft Artillery Group II/72 (GDF 07 twin 35mm autocannons and Aspide surface-to-air missiles with Skydor fire direction systems)
  - Anti-aircraft Artillery Regiment No. 73, in Cartagena
    - Anti-aircraft Artillery Group I/73 (GDF 07 twin 35mm autocannons and Aspide surface-to-air missiles with Skydor fire direction systems)
    - Anti-aircraft Artillery Group II/73 (NASAMS surface-to-air missile systems)
    - Anti-aircraft Artillery Group III/73 (MIM-104 Patriot surface-to-air missile systems), in Marines
  - Anti-aircraft Artillery Regiment No. 74, in Dos Hermanas
    - Anti-aircraft Artillery Group I/74 (MIM-23 Hawk surface-to-air missile systems)
    - Anti-aircraft Artillery Group II/74 (MIM-23 Hawk surface-to-air missile systems), in San Roque
    - Maintenance Group III/74
  - Anti-aircraft Artillery Command Signal Unit, in Madrid and Dos Hermanas

====== Engineer Command ======
- Engineer Command, in Salamanca
  - Engineer Regiment No. 1, in Castrillo del Val
    - Sapper Battalion I/1
  - Special Engineer Regiment No. 11, in Salamanca
    - Road Building Battalion I/11
    - Camp Building Battalion II/11
  - Bridge and Special Engineer Regiment No. 12, in Zaragoza
    - Pontoon Bridge Battalion I/12
    - Special Engineer Battalion III/12

====== Signal Command ======
- Signal Command, in Bétera
  - Signal Regiment No. 21, in Marines
    - Signal Battalion Command Posts I/21
    - Signal Battalion Hubs II/21
    - Signal Battalion Support III/21
  - Electronic Warfare Regiment No. 31, in El Pardo
    - Electronic Warfare Battalion I/31
    - Electronic Warfare Unit II/31

====== Logistic Brigade ======
- Logistic Brigade, in Zaragoza
  - Transport Grouping No. 1, in Madrid
    - Special Transport Group I/1
    - Deployment Support Group II/1, in Alcalá de Henares
      - Harbor terminal units in San Fernando, Los Barrios, Viator and Paterna
  - Logistic Support Grouping No. 11, in Colmenar Viejo
    - Supply Group I/11
    - Maintenance Group II/11
    - Services and Workshops Unit 112
  - Logistic Support Grouping No. 21, in Seville
    - Supply Group I/21
    - Maintenance Group II/21
    - Transport Group III/21, in Granada
    - Services and Workshops Unit 212, in Granada
  - Logistic Support Grouping No. 41, in Zaragoza
    - Supply Group I/41
    - Maintenance Group II/41
    - Transport Group III/41
    - Services and Workshops Unit 412, in Sant Boi de Llobregat
  - Logistic Support Grouping No. 61, Valladolid
    - Supply Group I/61
    - Maintenance Group II/61
    - Transport Group III/61
    - Services and Workshops Unit 612, in Burgos
  - Logistic Support Grouping No. 81, in San Cristóbal de la Laguna
    - Maintenance Group I/81
    - Supply Company No. 1/81
    - Transport Company No. 2/81
    - Ammunition Battery No. 3/81
    - Services and Workshops Unit 812
  - Medical Grouping No. 1, in Pozuelo de Alarcón
    - Medical Group I/1
    - Medical Group II/1
    - Medical Group III/1, in Zaragoza
    - Medical Group IV/1, in Zaragoza
    - NBC Decontamination Station
  - Medical Logistic Support Unit, in Madrid

==== Canary Islands Command ====
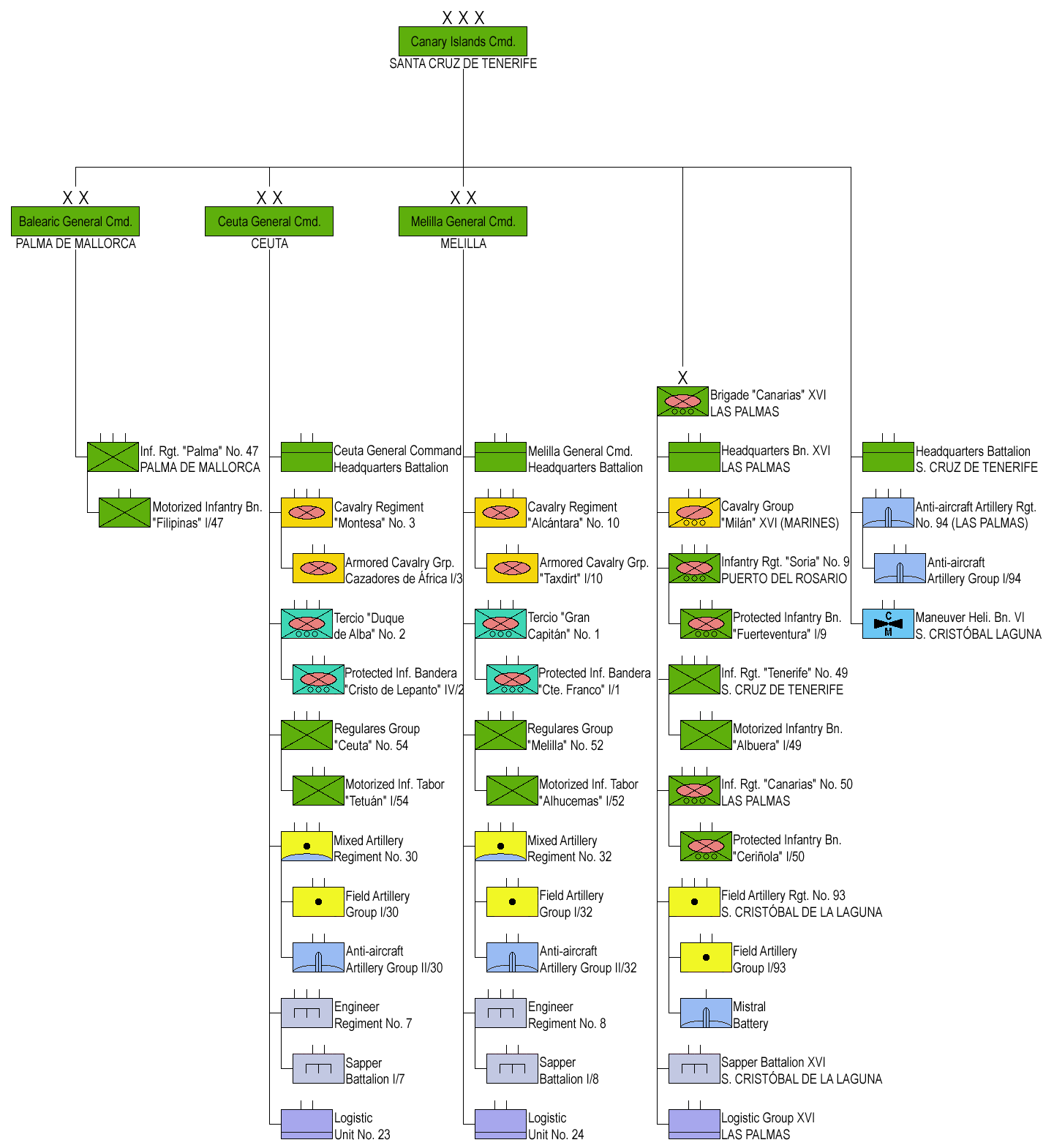
Canary Islands Command organization 2020 (click to enlarge)

The Canary Islands Command is a higher command based in Santa Cruz de Tenerife, which is tasked to establish and prepare operational units and tasked to carry out military operations in its assigned area. The command consists of all Spanish Army units outside continental Spain and is headed by a three-star general.

- Canary Islands Command, in Santa Cruz de Tenerife
  - Ceuta General Command, tasked with defending the exclave of Ceuta
  - Melilla General Command, tasked with defending the exclave of Melilla
  - Balearic General Command, tasked with defending the Balearic Islands
  - Brigade "Canarias" XVI, tasked with defending the Canary Islands
  - Anti-aircraft Artillery Regiment No. 94, in Las Palmas
    - Anti-aircraft Artillery Group I/94 (NASAMS surface-to-air missile systems, Mistral surface-to-air missiles and GDF 07 twin 35mm autocannons with Skydor fire direction systems)
  - Maneuver Helicopter Battalion VI, in San Cristóbal de La Laguna (AS332 B1 Super Puma)

===== Ceuta General Command =====
The command is headed by a two-star general.

- Ceuta General Command, in Ceuta
  - Ceuta General Command Headquarters Battalion
  - Cavalry Regiment "Montesa" No. 3
    - Armored Cavalry Group "Cazadores de África" I/3 (Leopard 2A4 tanks and Pizarro infantry fighting vehicles)
  - Tercio "Duque de Alba" No. 2 of the Legion
    - Protected Infantry Bandera "Cristo de Lepanto" IV/2 (BMR-M1 armored personnel carriers)
  - Regulares Group "Ceuta" No. 54
    - Motorized Infantry Tabor "Tetuán" I/54
  - Mixed Artillery Regiment No. 30
    - Field Artillery Group I/30 (155/52 APU-SIAC towed howitzers)
    - Anti-aircraft Artillery Group II/30 (Mistral surface-to-air missiles)
  - Engineer Regiment No. 7
    - Sapper Battalion I/7
  - Logistic Unit No. 23

===== Melilla General Command =====
The command is headed by a two-star general.

- Melilla General Command, in Melilla
  - Melilla General Command Headquarters Battalion
  - Cavalry Regiment "Alcántara" No. 10
    - Armored Cavalry Group "Taxdirt" I/10 (Leopard 2A4 tanks and Pizarro infantry fighting vehicles)
  - Tercio "Gran Capitán" No. 1 of the Legion
    - Protected Infantry Bandera "España" I/1 (BMR-M1 armored personnel carriers)
  - Regulares Group "Melilla" No. 52
    - Motorized Infantry Tabor "Alhucemas" I/52
  - Mixed Artillery Regiment No. 32
    - Field Artillery Group I/32 (155/52 APU-SIAC towed howitzers)
    - Anti-aircraft Artillery Group II/32 (Mistral surface-to-air missiles)
  - Engineer Regiment No. 8
    - Sapper Battalion I/8
  - Logistic Unit No. 24

===== Balearic General Command =====
The command is headed by a two-star general.

- Balearic General Command, in Palma de Mallorca
  - Infantry Regiment "Palma" No. 47, in Palma de Mallorca
    - Motorized Infantry Battalion "Filipinas" I/47

===== Brigade "Canarias" XVI =====
- Brigade "Canarias" XVI, in Las Palmas (Gran Canaria)
  - Headquarters Battalion XVI, in Las Palmas
  - Light Armored Cavalry Group "Milán" XVI, in Marines (Province of Valencia) (Centauro tank destroyers and VEC-M1 reconnaissance vehicles)
  - Infantry Regiment "Soria" No. 9, in Puerto del Rosario (Fuerteventura)
    - Protected Infantry Battalion "Fuerteventura" I/9 (BMR-M1 armored personnel carriers)
  - Infantry Regiment "Tenerife" No. 49, in Santa Cruz de Tenerife
    - Motorized Infantry Battalion "Albuera" I/49
  - Infantry Regiment "Canarias" No. 50, in Las Palmas
    - Protected Infantry Battalion "Ceriñola" I/50 (RG-31 Nyala and VAMTAC ST5 vehicles)
  - Field Artillery Regiment No. 93, in San Cristóbal de La Laguna (Tenerife)
    - Field Artillery Group I/93 (L-118A1 towed howitzers)
    - Mistral Battery (Mistral surface-to-air missiles)
  - Sapper Battalion XVI, in San Cristóbal de La Laguna and Las Palmas
  - Logistic Group XVI, in Las Palmas

=== Support Force ===
The Support Force is made up of five organizations, which report directly to the Chief of the Army General Staff.

==== Personnel Command ====
The Personnel Command is responsible for the planning, management, administration and control of the army's personnel management, personnel assistance, and healthcare.

- Personnel Command, in Madrid
  - Personnel Command Headquarters
    - Main Secretariat
  - Personnel Directorate
    - Military Career Sub-directorate of
    - Evaluation Sub-directorate
    - Personnel Management Sub-directorate
  - Personnel Assistance Directorate
    - Personnel Support Sub-Directorate
    - Social Centers Management Sub-Directorate
    - Military residences, sport centers, and sociocultural centers
  - Healthcare Directorate

==== Training and Doctrine Command ====
The Training and Doctrine Command is responsible for the planning, inspection, coordination and investigation of the army's knowledge management, which includes the doctrine, organization, materials, education and instruction systems, training, and evaluation.

- Training and Doctrine Command, in Granada
  - Training and Doctrine Command Headquarters
    - Main Secretariat
  - Research, Doctrine, Organization, and Materials Directorate
    - Doctrine, Organization, and Materials Sub-Directorate
    - Research and Lessons Learned Sub-Directorate
  - Education, Instruction, Training, and Evaluation Directorate
    - Education Sub-directorate
    - Instruction, Training and Evaluation Sub-directorate
    - General Military Academy, in Zaragoza
    - Non-commissioned Officers Basic General Academy, in Talarn
    - Infantry Academy, in Toledo
    - Cavalry Academy, in Valladolid
    - Artillery Academy, in Segovia
    - Engineer Academy, in Hoyo de Manzanares
    - Logistic Academy, in Calatayud
    - Army Aviation Academy, in Colmenar Viejo
    - Army War School, in Madrid
    - Army Higher Polytechnic School, in Madrid
    - Nuclear, Biological and Chemical Defense Military School, in Hoyo de Manzanares
    - Troop Formation Center No. 1, in Cáceres
    - Troop Formation Center No. 2, in San Fernando
    - National Training Center "San Gregorio", in Zaragoza
    - National Training Center "Chinchilla", in Chinchilla de Montearagón

==== Logistic Support Command ====
The Logistic Support Command is responsible materiel and logistical support processes, which includes the supply, maintenance and transportation functions and corresponding support engineering.

- Logistic Support Command, in Madrid
  - Logistic Support Command Headquarters
    - Main Secretariat
    - Engineering Command
    - Economic Affairs Command
  - Procurement Directorate
    - Weapon Systems Sub-directorate
    - Supplies and Services Sub-directorate
  - Logistic Functions Integration Directorate
    - Logistic Management Sub-directorate
    - Analysis Management Sub-directorate
    - Logistic Centers Command
      - Supply Depot and Center for Logistics Materiel, in Madrid
      - Maintenance Depot and Center for Armored Systems No. 1, in Madrid
      - Maintenance Depot and Center for Armored Systems No. 2, in Segovia
      - Maintenance Depot and Center for Wheeled Vehicles No. 1, in Torrejón de Ardoz
      - Maintenance Depot and Center for Wheeled Vehicles No. 2, in Cordoba
      - Maintenance Depot and Center for Artillery Weapons and Materiel, in Valladolid
      - Maintenance Depot and Center for Anti-aircraft, Coastal, and Missile Systems, in Pozuelo de Alarcón
      - Maintenance Depot and Center for Engineer Materiel, in Guadalajara
      - Maintenance Depot and Center for Signal Materiel, in El Pardo
      - Maintenance Depot and Center for Helicopters, in Colmenar Viejo
      - Maintenance Depot and Center for Hardware and Software Systems, in El Pardo

==== Army Main Inspectorate ====
The Army Main Inspectorate is responsible for the planning, management, administration and control of the army's infrastructures, environmental protection, and occupational hazards prevention.

- Army Main Inspectorate, in Barcelona
  - Army Main Inspectorate Headquarters
    - Main Secretariat
  - Quartermaster Directorate, in Madrid (doubles as First Main Sub-inspectorate (Center))
    - Second Main Sub-inspectorate (South), in Seville
    - Third Main Sub-inspectorate (Pyrenees), in Barcelona
    - Fourth Main Sub-inspectorate (Northwest), in Valladolid
    - Fifth Main Sub-inspectorate (Canary Islands), in Santa Cruz de Tenerife
  - Infrastructure Directorate

==== Economic Affairs Directorate ====
The Economic Affairs Directorate is responsible for the planning, management, administration and control of the financial resources made available to the Army, and also for contracting and accounting.

- Economic Affairs Directorate, in Madrid
  - Accounting and Budget Sub-directorate
  - Economic Management and Contracting Sub-directorate

== Graphic overview of the Spanish Army ==
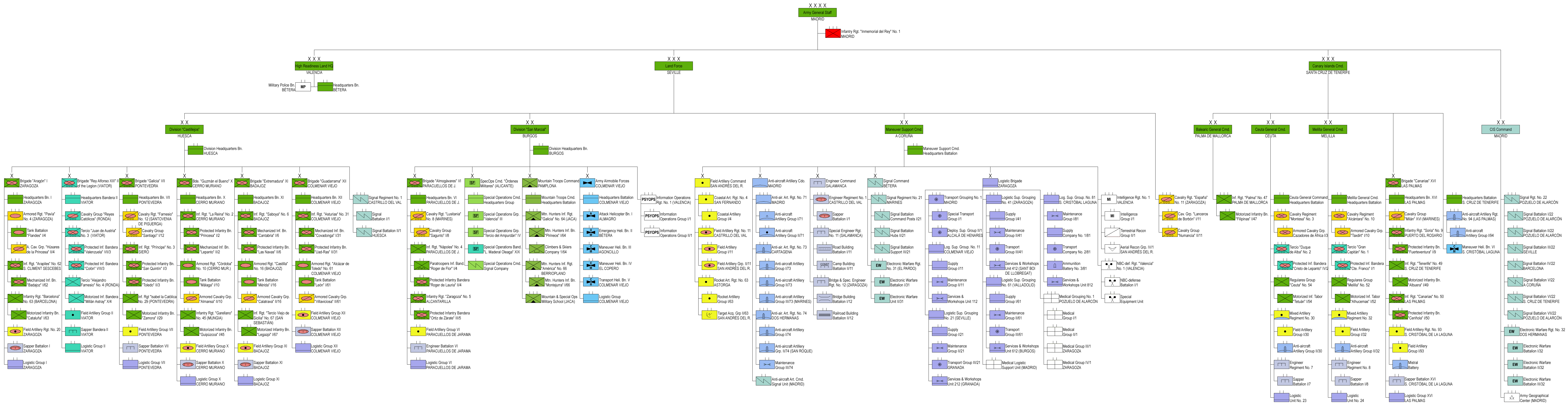
Spanish Army organization 2020 (click to enlarge).

== Geographic distribution of operational forces ==
Armor Mechanized Infantry Protected Infantry Motorized Infantry Mountain Hunters Paratroopers Spanish Legion
Cavalry Field Artillery Anti-aircraft Artillery Helicopters Engineers Signals Logistics Other units
Locations with multiple units; units listed in the table below
(Brigade headquarters battalions, field artillery groups, sapper battalions, and logistic groups are based alongside their brigade headquarters)

Community of Madrid	Province of Valencia	Province of Seville	Other provinces	Overseas
Madrid: Anti-aircraft Art. Cmd. Anti-aircraft Art. Rgt. 71 Rgt. "Inmemorial del Rey" 1 Electronic Warfare Rgt. 31; Transport Grouping 1	Valencia: High Readiness Land HQ; Intelligence Rgt. 1 Info-Ops Rgt. 1 NBC-defense Rgt. "Valencia" 1	Seville: Land Force; Log. Sup. Grouping 21; Signal Bn. III/22	Castrillo del Val: Field Artillery Rgt. 11; Engineer Rgt. 1 Signal Rgt. 1	Ceuta: Ceuta General Command Cavalry Rgt. "Montesa" 3 Tercio "Duque de Alba" 2 Regulares Grp. "Ceuta" 54 Mixed Artillery Rgt. 30 Engineer Rgt. 7
Colmenar Viejo: Brigade "Guadarrama" XII Rgt. "Asturias" 31 Rgt. "Alcázar de Toledo" 61 Army Airmobile Forces Transport Heli. Bn. V Log. Sup. Grouping 11	Bétera: Signal Command; Military Police Bn. I Emergency Heli. Bn. II	Dos Hermanas: Electronic Warfare Rgt. 32; Anti-aircraft Art. Rgt. 74; Maneuver Heli. Bn. IV	Zaragoza: Brigade "Aragón" I Rgt. "Pavia" 4 Field Art. Rgt. 20 Logistic Brigade Log. Sup. Grouping 41 Cavalry Rgt. "España" 11; Engineer Rgt. 12	Melilla: Melilla General Command Cavalry Rgt. "Alcántara" 10 Tercio "Gran Capitán" 1 Regulares Grp. "Melilla" 52 Mixed Artillery Rgt. 32 Engineer Rgt. 8
Paracuellos de Jarama: Brigade "Almogávares" VI Rgt. "Nápoles" 4	Marines: Cavalry Rgt. "Lusitania" 8 Signal Rgt. 21; Cavalry Grp. "Milán" XVI; Anti-aircraft Art. Grp. III/73		S. Andrés d. Rabanedo: Field Artillery Command; Field Artillery Grp. II/11; Target Acquisition Grp. II/63; Aerial Recon Grp. IV/1	Canary Islands: Canary Islands Command Anti-aircraft Art. Rgt. 94 Maneuver Heli. Bn. VI Brigade "Canarias" XVI Rgt. "Soria" 9 Rgt. "Tenerife" 49 Rgt. "Canarias" 50 Field Art. Rgt. 93 Sapper Bn. XVI
Pozuelo de Alarcón: Signal Rgt. 22; Medical Grouping 1				

== See also ==
- Structure of the Spanish Army in 1990
