= Pitarch =

Pitarch is a Catalan surname. Notable people with the surname include:

- David Ortega Pitarch (born 1979), Spanish freestyle and backstroke swimmer
- Francisco Pitarch (1927–1977), Spanish footballer
- Jesús García Pitarch (born 1963), Spanish retired footballer
- Thiago Pitarch (born 2007), Spanish footballer
- Vicente Zarzo Pitarch (1938–2021), Spanish horn player
