= Vicente Zarzo Pitarch =

Spanish horn player (1938–2021)

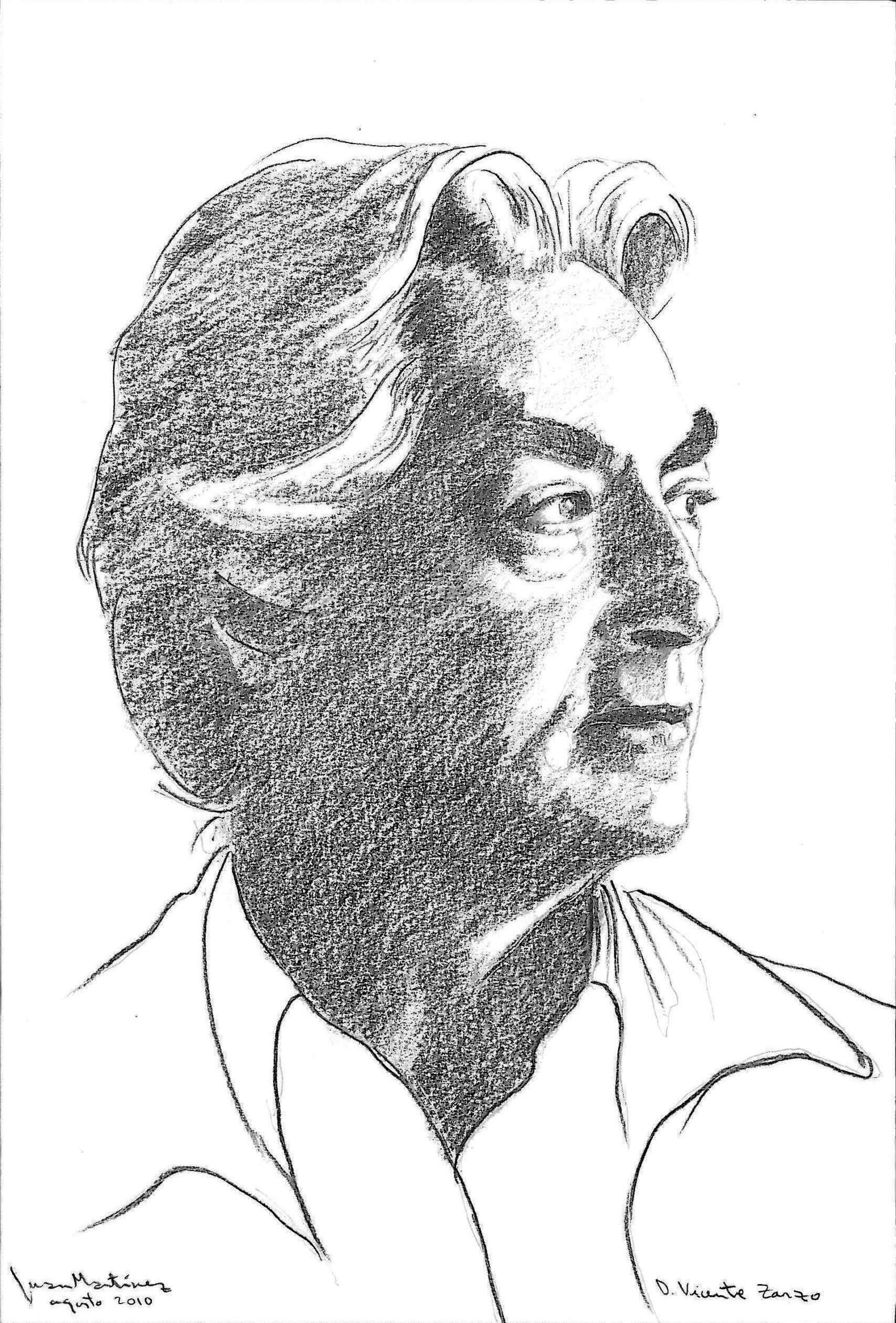
- Born: 6 May 1938; Benaguasil, Province of Valencia, Spain
- Died: 14 September 2021 (aged 83); Marines, Valencia, Spain
- Education: Valencia Conservatorio
- Occupations: Horn player; Writer
- Organization: Residentie Orchestra

Vicente Zarzo Pitarch (6 May 1938 – 14 September 2021) was a Spanish horn player. He played as a soloist in several European and North American orchestras. He was also the author of several books on the history and technique of the horn.

== Life and career ==
Zarzo was born in Benaguasil, in the Province of Valencia, and studied the horn at the Conservatorio Superior de Música Joaquín Rodrigo in Valencia. He later studied with Hans Noeth in Munich, Germany.

For 25 years, Zarzo was principal horn in The Hague Philharmonic (Residentie Orkest) and others. He also played as horn soloist for the Valencia Orchestra, the Symphony Orchestra of the Gran Teatre del Liceu in Barcelona, the Iceland Symphony Orchestra in Reykjavík, the American Wind Symphony Orchestra in Pittsburgh, and the National Orchestra of Mexico.

Pitarch died on 14 September 2021, age 83.

== Recognition ==
In 2004, Zarzo was given the Giovanni Punto Award by the International Horn Society and named an "Insigne de la Música Valenciana" by the Academia Valenciana de la Música. The Calle Músico Vicente Zarzo, a street in central Granada is named in his honour.

Zarzo was named an honorary member of the International Horn Society (IHS) in August 2020.

== Works composed for Vicente Zarzo Pitarch ==
- Quaterni II by Jan van Vlijmen (premiered by the Royal Concertgebouw Orchestra)
- Sinfónica No. 3 for wind orchestra by Eduardo Mata (premiered by the University of Mexico Orchestra)
- Confronti, horn concerto by Wim Laman (premiered at the Royal Conservatory of The Hague)
- Concert for french-horn by Hans Henkemans that was first played in the KRO broadcasting co. by the Radio Hilversum Orchestra conducted by Ed Spanjaard.
- Sonata para trompa y piano and Concierto para 4 trompas y orquesta by Amando Blanquer; both works have first been played in the Netherlands, the first one with the pianist Jan van der Meer and the second with the Radio Hilversum Orchestra conducted by Jan Stulen.

== Performances as a soloist ==
- As a french-horn soloist Vicente Zarzo played with the Orquesta Municipal de Valencia conducted by Manuel Galduf. One of these concerts was the premiere of the Concierto de trompa by Rafael Talens.
- He performed with the Orquesta de Valladolid, directed by Eduardo Díaz Muñoz, the Orquesta de Oviedo directed by Arturo Tamayo and the Orquesta de Tenerife conducted by Armando Alfonso, Francesc Llonguera and Edmon Colomer.
- Vicente Zarzo played with the Orquesta Filarmónica de Gran Canaria conducted by Cervera Collado and Cenura. With La Banda Municipal de Madrid he has performed Concierto num. 1 opus 11 by R. Strauss which was the premiere in Spain performed by french-horn and symphonic band.
- He performed with Orquesta Sinfonica de Port (Portugal) conducted by Luis Antonio García Navarro, with the Philharmonic Orchestra of Groningen conducted by García Navarro and with the Orquesta Sinfónica de Madrid conducted by Antonio Ros Marvá.
- Vicente Zarzo performed with the Orquesta Nacional de México conducted by Carlos Chávez and Luis Herrera de la Fuente and with the Orquesta de la Universidad de México conducted by Sasha Popov, founder of 7 of 12 orchestras in Bulgaria.
- Vicente Zarzo played with the National Orchestra of Reykjavik, conducted by Wodan Wodiczco, with the Residentie–Orkest of the Hague he played the Mozart's Horn Concerto No. 4 12 times in the U.S. and Canada, conducted by Jean Martinon, three concerts in Strasbourg conducted by Hans Vonk, 20 concerts in the Netherlands conducted by Hiroyuki Iwaki.
- He played two concerts with the Ulster Orchestra of Belfast. He played Horn Concerto No. 1 by Richard Strauss three times in England, conducted by Ferdinand Leitner and twice in Yugoslavia (Dubrovnik and Zagreb), conducted by Vonk with the Residentie-Orkest. With the same orchestra he played Upon La Mi for soprano, frenchhorn and orchestra conducted by Mercier.
- The work Le canyon aux étoiles for horn, piano and orchestra by Olivier Messiaen was played by Zarzo and Yvonne Loriod, the composer's wife.
- He played the world premiere of Quaterni II with the Concertgebouw Orkest conducted by Lucas Vis.

== Radio recordings ==
The Dutch radio recorded 140 concerts, some of them premieres, such as music for horn and harp, horn and violin, horn and organ. Concertos for horn and orchestra by Gallay, Pawels, José Muñoz Molleda, and the complete works for horn by Amando Blanquer were also in the Netherlands.

== Commercial recordings ==
- Quintets by Mozart and Beethoven for brass and piano with Radu Lupu – DECCA 414 219–2
- Trio for violin, horn and piano, Op. 40 by Brahms – Residentie Orchestra – CD 420 056-2
- Soli I for brass quintet and Soli IV for trumpet, horn and trombone by Carlos Chávez – Columbia 31 534
- Symphony No. 3 with corno obbligato by E. Mata (composed for Vicente Zarzo) RCA Victor MRS-003
- Horn Concertos by Hindemith, M. Arnold and Amando Blanquer. Alberri ALS-10.113-A
- Horn music by Amando Blanquer Producciones musicales ML. MI 99-018-CD
- Trios for violin, horn and piano by Claudio Prieto, Francisco Llácer Pla and Amando Blanquer. Producciones Musicales ML. ML 033
- Mozart Horn Concertos performed with the symphonic band la Artística de Buñol – WWM 500.067.
- Baroque music by Harmonie Mundi.
- Spanish music of the XXI century for horn
- Horn and voice
- Schubert's "Auf dem Strom", Op. 119, Brahms: Trio Op. 40
- trompa miscellanea
- Music by C. Saint-Saens, R. Strauss and José Muñoz Molleda
- Virtuoso chamber music
- Música rusa para trompa (Russian horn music) with Bartomeu Jaume
- Music by Duvernoy, Clerisse and Gallay
- Trios for violin, horn and piano

== Bibliography ==
- 70 Estudios Convencionales En Cuatro Volúmenes op. 5 Para Trompa, Piles, Editorial de Música, S.A. 1 January 1998.
- with Bernhard Krol [in German] (1 January 1995). 10 estudios para trompa, op. 7: sobre una idea de B. Krol. Piles. ISBN 978-84-88548-83-2.
- 13 Estudios Variados Para Trompa. Piles, Editorial de Música, S.A. 1 January 1997. ISBN 978-84-89595-58-3.
- Anécdotas y sucesos: una mirada al Benaguasil de los años cincuenta. Consolat de Mar. 2009.
- Compendio de la Técnica de la Trompa. Piles, Editorial de Música, S.A. 1 January 1995. ISBN 978-84-88548-81-8.
- Compendio sobre las escuelas europeas de trompa. Piles, Editorial de Música, S.A. 1 February 1994. ISBN 978-84-88548-35-1.
- Grandes trompistas del pasado. Ediciones Seyer. 1997. ISBN 978-84-86975-56-2.
- La trompa: história y desarrollo. Seyer. 1994. ISBN 978-84-86975-34-0.
- Una vida para la música. Rural Sant Vicent Ferrer. 1 March 1995. ISBN 978-84-7050-403-7.
