= Benaguasil =

- Municipality
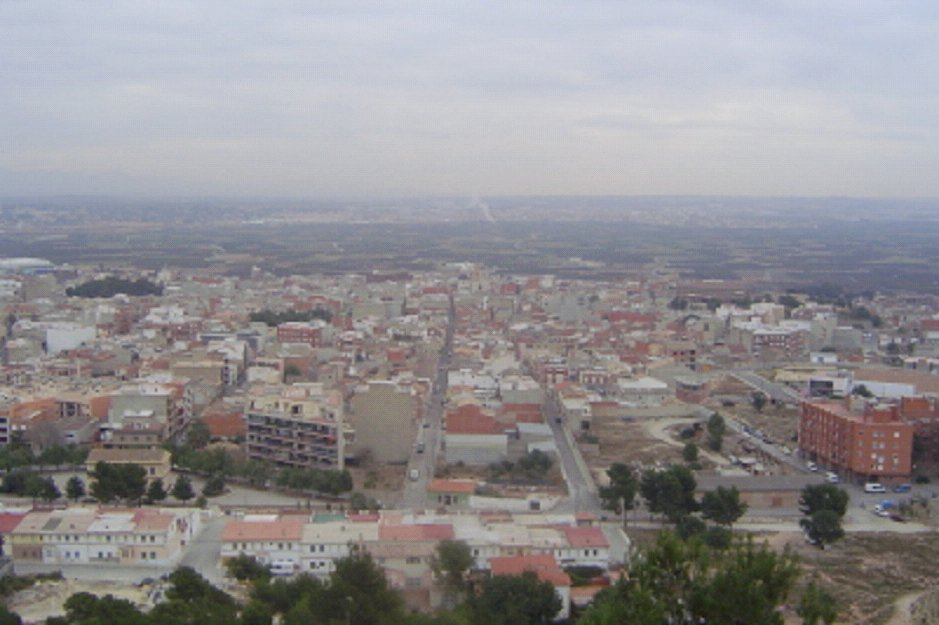

- Coat of arms

- Location in Spain
- Coordinates: 39°35′36″N 0°35′11″W
- Country: Spain
- Autonomous community: Valencian Community
- Province: Valencia
- Comarca: Camp de Túria
- Judicial district: Llíria

Government
  - Alcalde: José Joaquín Segarra Castillo (PP)

Area
  - Total: 25.4 km^{2} (9.8 sq mi)
- Elevation: 110 m (360 ft)

Population (2025-01-01)
  - Total: 12,668
  - Density: 499/km^{2} (1,290/sq mi)
- Demonym: Benaguacilero/a
- Time zone: UTC+1 (CET)
  - Summer (DST): UTC+2 (CEST)
- Postal code: 46180
- Official language(s): Valencian
- Website: Official website

Benaguasil is a municipality in the Valencian Community, Spain, situated in the Camp de Túria comarca.

== Geography ==
Benaguasil is situated at the left side of the Túria or Guadalaviar river, 25 km from Valencia. Bordering cities: Llíria, la Pobla de Vallbona, Riba-roja de Túria, Vilamarxant and Pedralba.

The traditional economy is based on agriculture with onions and oranges as important crops. But industries such as textiles and construction materials are becoming increasingly important.

The local Festes are Falles (15–20 March), and Festes de Montiel (8 September).

== History ==
Benaguasil was built by an important Arab family, al-Wazir, over the ruins of a Roman villa.

== See also ==
- List of municipalities in Valencia
