= Camp de Túria =

Coordinates: 39°37′30″N 0°35′42″W

Camp de Túria Campo de Turia
- Comarca
- Country: Spain
- Autonomous community: Valencian Community
- Province: València / Valencia
- Capital and largest city: Llíria
- Municipalities: 16 municipalities: Benaguasil, Benisanó, Bétera, Casinos, L'Eliana, Gátova, Llíria, Loriguilla, Marines, Náquera, Olocau de Carraixet, La Pobla de Vallbona, Riba-roja de Túria, San Antonio de Benagéber, Serra de Portaceli, Vilamarxant

Area
  - Total: 823.37 km^{2} (317.90 sq mi)

Population (2006)
  - Total: 130,895
  - Density: 158.97/km^{2} (411.74/sq mi)
- Time zone: UTC+1 (CET)
  - Summer (DST): UTC+2 (CEST)

Camp de Túria (Valencian: [ˈkamb de ˈtuɾia]; Spanish: Campo de Turia [ˈkampo ðe ˈtuɾja]) is a comarca in the province of Valencia, Valencian Community, Spain.

== Geography ==
It comprises the lower reaches of the river Túria and its adjacent territories. Borders with the region of Camp de Morvedre and the counties of Horta de València. The south by the counties of Hoya de Buñol, west to the region of the Serranos, and north by the region of Alto Palencia.

Loriguilla is an exclave and lies between the comarcas of Los Serranos and Requena-Utiel. Whereas most of the comarca belong to the Valencian-speaking part of the Valencian Community, the exclave lies in the Spanish-speaking west.

== Municipalities ==
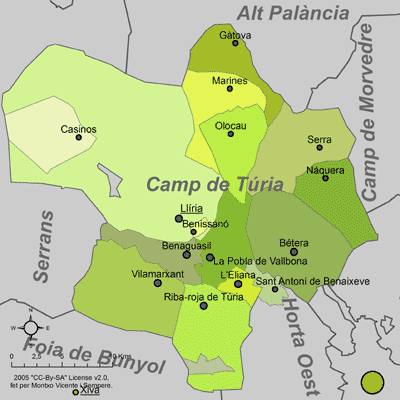
Municipalities of Camp de Túria

- Benaguasil
- Benissanó
- Bétera
- Casinos
- L'Eliana
- Gátova
- Llíria
- Loriguilla
- Marines
- Náquera
- Olocau de Carraixet
- La Pobla de Vallbona
- Riba-roja de Túria
- San Antonio de Benagéber
- Serra de Portaceli
- Vilamarxant
