= Bétera =

- Town and municipality
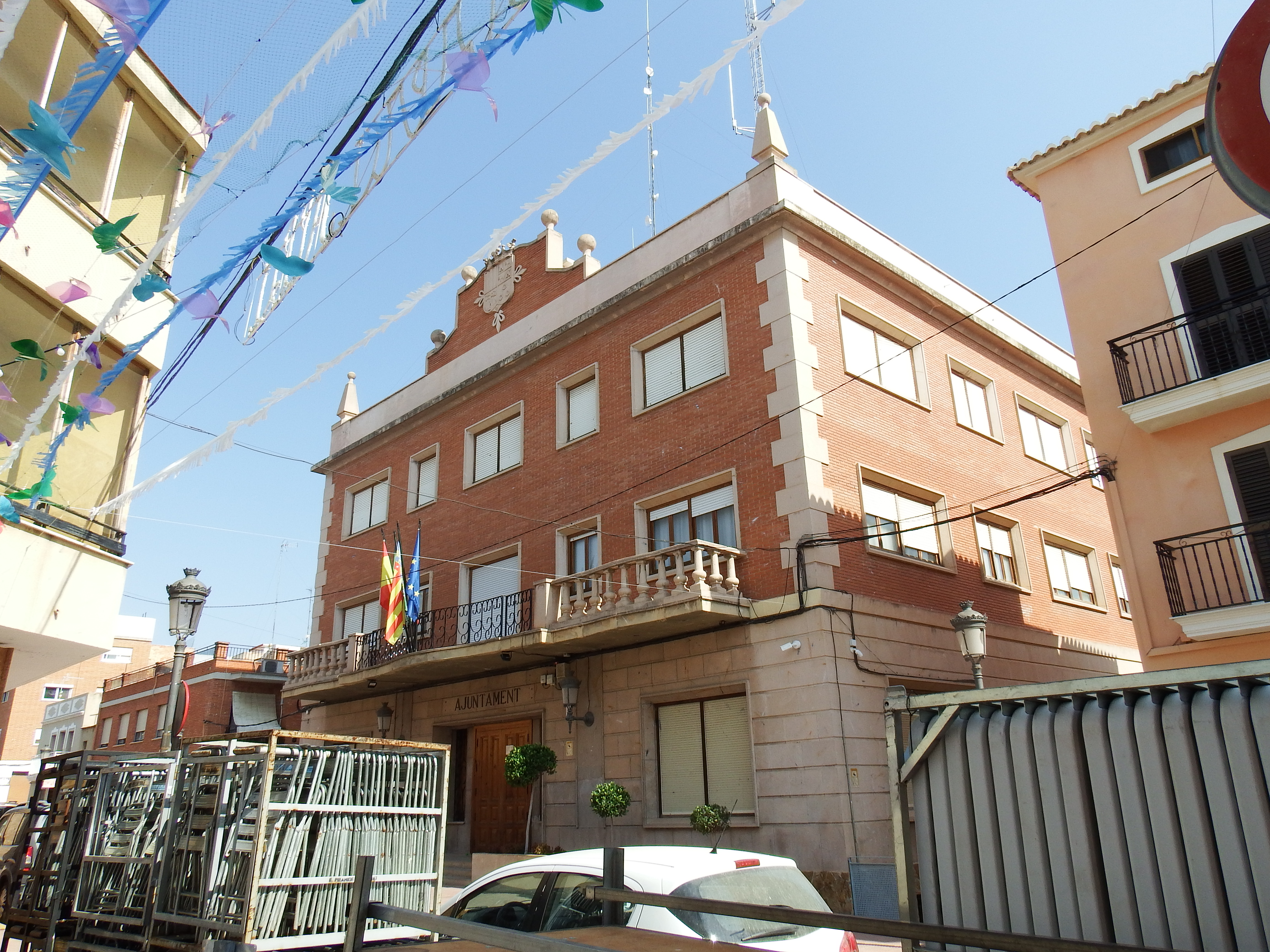
- Town hall

- Flag Coat of arms

- Location in Spain Bétera (Valencian Community) Bétera (Spain)
- Coordinates: 39°35′36″N 0°27′46″W
- Country: Spain
- Autonomous community: Valencian Community
- Province: Valencia
- Comarca: Camp de Túria
- Judicial district: Llíria

Government
  - Alcaldessa (Mayoress): María Elia Verdevío Escribá (PP)

Area
  - Total: 75.70 km^{2} (29.23 sq mi)
- Elevation: 125 m (410 ft)

Population (2025-01-01)
  - Total: 28,560
  - Density: 377.3/km^{2} (977.1/sq mi)
- Demonyms: Béteran • beterà, -ana (Val.) • beterano/a, also beterense (Sp.)
- Official language(s): Valencian; Spanish
- Linguistic area: Valencian
- Time zone: UTC+1 (CET)
  - Summer (DST): UTC+2 (CEST)
- Postal code: 46117
- Website: Official website

Bétera (Note: Pronunciation of Bétera: Valencian: [ˈbeteɾa] Spanish: [ˈbeteɾa]) is a town and municipality in the comarca of Camp de Túria in the Valencian Community, Spain. With 23,647 inhabitants, it is the second most populous town in the Camp de Túria region (INE 2018), in the second zone of the Valencia metropolitan area.

== Geography ==
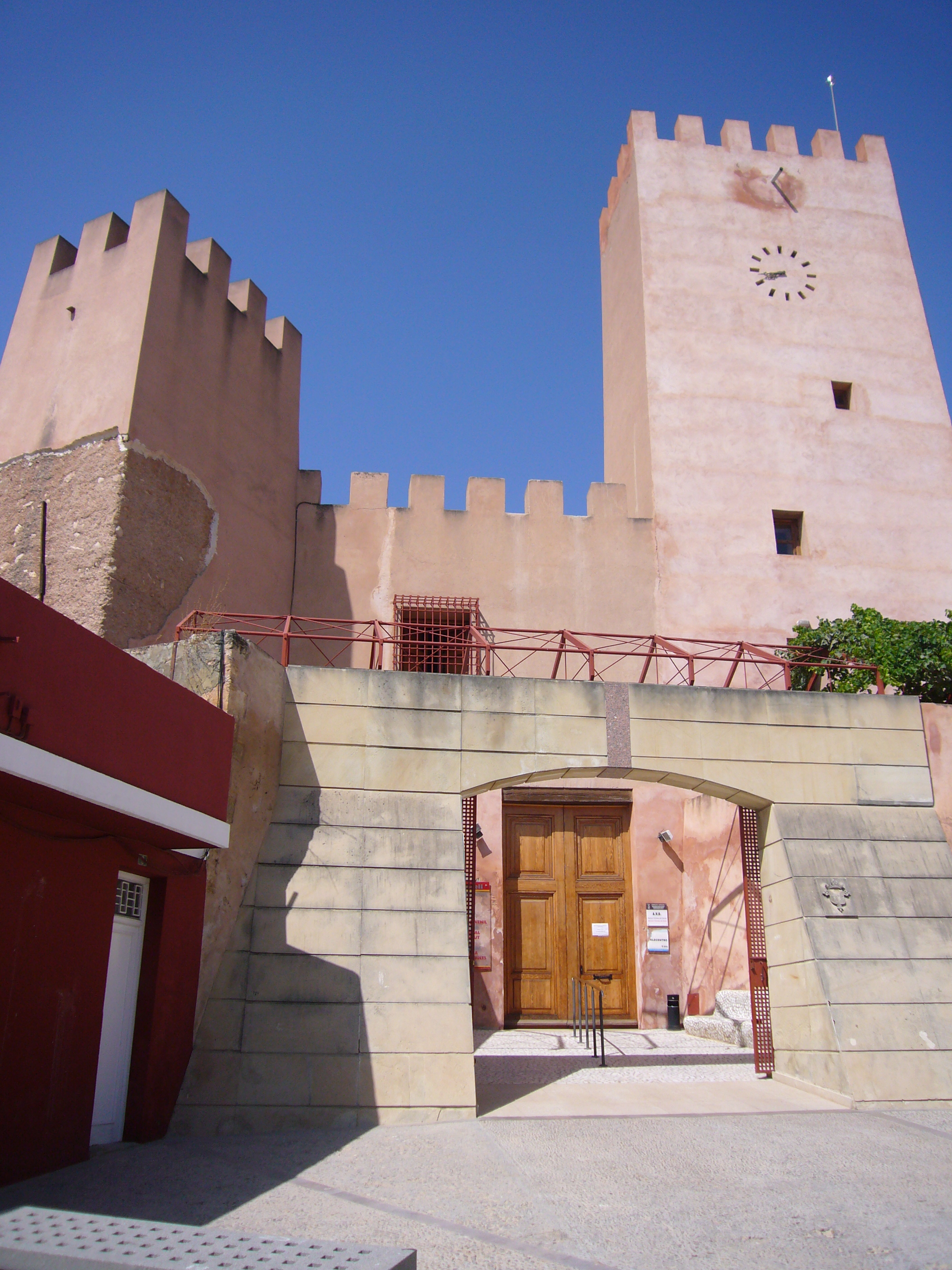
The facade of Bétera Castle in 2008

Bétera is situated on the southern slopes of the Serra Calderona, 15 km from Valencia and 23 km from the Mediterranean Sea on the border with the Valencian "market garden", L'Horta. It has a slightly undulating surface, reaching 156 meters at its highest point.

Its geographical location between the sea and mountains provides a microclimate, which is the mildest of the region, where the prevailing winds are Levant and Ponent. The rains occur mainly in autumn and spring.

As it is in the metropolitan area of Valencia, there are several road links, such as the Burjassot-Torres Torres road, the Bétera-Olocau road, the San Antonio de Benagéber road which links to the motorway Valencia Túria-Ademuz (CV-35) and the Mediterranean motorway (A-7), as well as others leading to the parishes and neighbourhoods of the city and surrounding towns.

Public transport is accessible via one of the northern terminal stations of Metro Line 1 of Valencia. This railway line (which, though given the title "Metro", is more a commuter rail) is heir to the former Valencia Trenet, ranging from Bétera to the Pont de Fusta station in Valencia. The Sanatori Psiquiàtric stop also serves the town.

== Sport ==
The 2024 Volta a la Comunitat Valenciana Fèmines began at Bétera.

== Districts and Parishes ==
Surrounding Bétera are also the following districts:

- El Baró:. Urbanisation Vall de Flors.
- La Malla:. Urbanisation La Masia and the military base "Jaime I", under NATO high command.
- Mallaetes:. La Cornada and Montesano.
- Masia Arnal:. Les Almudes.
- Mas Camarena:. La Esmeralda, Las Fuentes, Oasis, Sector A, Soto de Camarena and Jardines de Camarena.
- Providència:. Camí de Paterna, Urbanisations Cumbres de San Antonio, Torre En Conill and la Virgen de la Estrella.

The southern part of town has grown rapidly in recent years, and there are several developments planned and under construction, contiguous to the urban area.

== Bordering towns ==
- Godella
- Montcada
- Nàquera
- Paterna
- Pobla de Vallbona
- Serra
- Valencia
- San Antonio de Benagéber

== Twinning ==
Bétera is twinned with:

- Italy Pont-Saint-Martin (Val d'Aosta, Italy)

== See also ==
- List of municipalities in Valencia
