= Nuestra Señora de la Encarnación, Nàquera =

Church in Naquera, Spain

Nuestra Señora de la Encarnación (Our Lady of the Incarnation) is a Roman Catholic church located in Nàquera, province of Valencia, Spain.

The church was erected at the site of a former mosque soon after the conquest of Valencia in the 13th century. For many years, the town shared priest with the town of Serra or Torres Torres. In 1579, the church was noted to be in poor shape; in 1725 it was demolished and reconstruction in stone and brick began in 1754, and completed in 1757. A permanent priest was named for Nàquera in 1759. The church underwent refurbishment in the early 20th century.

The top of the tower was added in 1901. In 1936, the interior of the church was subject to arson, and the church became a garage. At the end of 1938, it served as a ballroom and cinema. The church was reconsecrated in 1941.

The church has reacquired paintings and decorations. This includes the canvases depicting The Flagellation of Christ and Supper at Emmaus (1655) by Pere Salvador. In addition there is a large Renaissance predella in the chapel of St Francis.
