= NATO Rapid Deployable Corps – Spain =

Multi-national corps headquarters of the Spanish Army and NATO

- Coat of arms
- Active: 2000–present
- Allegiance: (NATO) North Atlantic Treaty Organization
- Part of: Allied Command Operations, Casteau, Belgium
- Location: "Jaime I" Military Base, Bétera, Spain

The NATO Rapid Deployable Corps – Spain (NRDC-SP) is a corps headquarters of the Spanish Army. It was established in 2000 as a High Readiness Force (HRF) of NATO. Its facilities are located at the "Jaime I" Military Base in Bétera, province of Valencia.

== History ==
The NATO Rapid Deployable Corps – Spain was established in 2000.

== Structure ==
The NATO Rapid Deployable Headquarters can be quickly deployed for disaster management, humanitarian assistance, peace support, counterterrorism and high-intensity warfighting.
