= Spanish Army Air Defence Command =

Command of the Spanish Army

Coat of arms of the Spanish Army Air Defence Command.

The Spanish Army Air Defence Command (Spanish: Mando de Artillería Antiaérea, MAAA) is a command of the Spanish Army, based in Madrid; composed of anti-air artillery units under a same command, formed, trained and equipped to contribute, into a joint or joint/combined frame, to the air space control and defense. Those units may act either in the national territory or as a reinforcement to allied organization based on the joint and Army specific doctrine.

The MAAA is composed of a General Quarter and a set of anti-aircraft artillery units and units of combat support.

The units belonging to the MAAA are:

- 71st Anti-air Artillery Regiment in Madrid with Mistral surface-to-air missiles and 35/90 Guns
- 73rd Anti-air Artillery Regiment in Cartagena, Murcia with Skyguard-Aspide surface-to-air missile systems and NASAMS surface-to-air missile systems, also in Valencia with MIM-104 Patriot surface-to-air missile systems
- 74th Anti-air Artillery Regiment in San Roque, Cádiz and at Base El Copero in Dos Hermanas, Seville with HAWK PIP III surface-to-air missile systems
- 81st Anti-Aircraft Artillery Regiment of Marines in Valencia
- Signal Battalion in Madrid and at Base El Copero in Dos Hermanas, Seville

The 94th Anti-air Artillery Regiment, which fields NASAMS surface-to-air missile systems falls under operational control of the Canarias General Command.

The 72nd Anti-Air Artillery Regiment was disbanded in December 2015.

== Equipment in service ==
These are the air-defence systems in service with the Spanish Army.

=== Air surveillance and command centers ===
Mostly used with very short, short and medium range systems.

Model	Origin	Image	Type	Quantity	Notes
Command centers
COAAS-M Centro de Operaciones de Artillería Semiautomático Medio	Italy Spain		Air defence command and control	Unclear	Composed of: CIO (Information and Operations Center) which plans the deployment of the air defence units; CPL (personnel and logistics center) which plans the sustainment of the deployed units; FDC (fire directorate center); Radar: RAC 3-D; IT of firing points (intelligent terminals) which are semi-automated (the SkyDor or Mistral; TPO (observation post terminals) providing information about air raids in areas not covered by radars; COAAS-M shelter on a URO VAMTAC. It can receive and distribute air detection information from and to all air defence systems.
COAAS-L Centro de Operaciones de Artillería Semiautomático Ligero	Italy Spain	—	Air defence command and control	Unclear	Can be integrated to the COAAS-L through a PR4-G radio. The COAAS-L can be connected to 2 Raven radars. The system uses a radar console CONRAD.
Sensors
Thales Nederland Raven – COAAS-L Centro de Operaciones de Artillería Semiautomático Ligero	Netherlands Spain		X-band, FMCW (frequency modulated continuous wave), air surveillance radar	Unclear	Radar that can be used on its own or with the COAAS-L system. The data transferred to the COAAS-L through a PR4-G radio. Range 20km, low and very low altitude surveillance. Used primarily with Mistral air defence systems and with 35/90 air defence canons.
RAC 3D – COAAS-M Centro de Operaciones de Artillería Semiautomático Medio	France Italy Spain		C-band (UHF) 3D radar, air surveillance radar (medium low and very low altitude)	Unclear	Radar associated to the COAAS-M system that supports the air defence systems. Range of 100 km. Vehicle used by the Iveco-Pegaso M320 8×8. Used primarily with Mistral air defence systems and with 35/90 air defence canons. Its replacement is being considered.
LPD-20	Switzerland Spain		Early warnning radar, low / very low altitude	—	

=== Air defence weapons ===
==== MIM-104 Patriot PAC-2 system ====
The fire units currently in service were purchased to the German Air Force between 2004 and 2014.

Model	Origin	Image	Type	Quantity	Notes
Fire units
MIM-104 Patriot PAC-2	United States Germany		Medium to long range air defence fire unit	3	Purchases of the fire units: 1 purchased second-hand from Germany in 2004; 2 purchased second-hand from Germany, received in June 2015
Fire units composition
M901	United States Germany		Launching station (TEL) Transporter erector launcher	18	Spain operates 6 launchers per fire unit. Each can carry up to 4 PAC-2 missiles.
AN/MSQ-104 ECS Engagement Control Station	United States Germany		Command and control center	3	1 per fire unit.
AN/MPQ-53	United States Germany		PESA fire-control radar Passive electronically scanned array"	3	1 radar system per PAC-2 fire unit- The system is made of a radar, an IFF and an ECCM and track-via-missile.
OE-349 Antenna Mast Group	United States Germany		Transmission station (UHF communications array)	6	2 directional transmission systems per fire units. Transmitting data from the ECS to the launchers.
Patriot PAC-2 generators	United States Germany		Electrical power plant for radar	8	2 generators on one truck per fire unit.
Missiles
PAC-2 Plus missiles	United States		SAM missile - anti-aircraft / anti-ballistic - long range Surface-to-air	Unknown	
Vehicles
MAN KAT1 8×8 LKW 15t mil gl KAT I A1 (8×8)	Germany		Military trucks	21	Used with the radar and the TEL.
MAN KAT1 6×6 LKW 10t mil gl KAT I A1 (6×6)	Germany		Military trucks	13	Used with the ECS, the transmission system and the generator trucks.
MAN KAT1 8×8 munition reloading truck LKW 15t mil gl KAT I A1 (8×8)	Germany		Munition reloading trucks	Unknown	A truck equipped with a crane to reload the munitions on the launchers.

==== MIM-23B Hawk ====
Model	Origin	Image	Type	Quantity	Notes
Batteries
MIM-23B Hawk	United States		Medium-range, semi-active radar homing, SAM Surface-to-air missile	2	Orders: 4 batteries purchased in 1965 (24 launchers).; 2 batteries purchased second-hand from the US Army in 2001 (12 launchers).; Modernisation in 1984 with the PIP III (Product Improvement Plan 3). Donations to Ukraine as of July 2025: 1 battery in November 2022.; 1 battery in October 2023.; 1 battery supplied in July 2024.; 1 battery in September 2024.
Fire units composition
MIM-23 Hawk launcher	United States		Missile launcher	14	24 launchers purchased in 1965, 12 additional in 2001, and 22 donated to Ukraine as of July 2025.: 4 launchers in November 2022.; 6 launchers in October 2023.; 6 launchers supplied in July 2024.; 6 launchers in September 2024.
Battery Command Post	United States		Digital command and control post	2	1 unified digital command post for the battery. 2 remain in service (4 + 2 purchased). 2025: Indra to modernise it with a modern IFF system.
AN/MPQ-50	United States		C-band (IEEE), pulse acquisition, air surveillance radar	2	Radar used for long range medium to high altitude surveillance. 1 radar per battery. 2 remain in service (4 + 2 purchased).
AN/MPQ-61	United States		Fire-control radar	4	Radar used to illuminate the targets. 2 radars per battery. Upgraded to PIP III variant, addition of a Low-Altitude Simultaneous Hawk Engagement (LASHE) system. 4 remain in service (8 + 4 purchased).
AN/MPQ-62	United States		Continuous wave radar	2	Radar used for low altitude threat detection. 1 radar per battery. 2 remain in service (4 + 2 purchased).
Missiles
MIM-23B Hawk	United States		Medium-range, semi-active radar homing, SAM Surface-to-air missile	Unknown	

==== NASAMS 2 ====
The system has been in service since 2003, and a modernisation contract was signed in 2025.

Model	Origin	Image	Type	Quantity	Notes
Fire units
NASAMS 2 "National Advanced Surface-to-Air Missile System"	Norway United States		Short to medium range air defence fire unit	4	4 fire units ordered in 2003. Modernisation to the standard NASAMS 2+ ordered in 2025 (€410 million), planned to enter service in 2027. Note: 1 fire unit purchased by the air force to replace the Spada 2000 assigned to the Air Deployment Support Squadron.
Fire units composition
LCHR M-1 0-1 (Also known as Mk-I launcher)	Norway		NASAMS missile launcher	8 (4 additional planned)	2 launchers per fire unit. To be modernised to the Mk-II launcher standard, and a third launcher to be added by fire unit. Note: 3 additional for the air force for the fire unit purchased by the air force.
Kongsberg FDC Fire Distribution Center	Norway	(illustration)	Command center	4	To be modernised with the shift to the standard NASAMS 2+. Note: 1 additional purchased by the air force.
AN/MPQ-64M1 Sentinel	United States		Fire-control, AESA, 3D, X-band radar	4	Range of 75 km (47 mi) and can track up to 80 targets. Being modernised to the standard F1 with the modernisation to the standard NASAMS 2+. Note: 1 additional ordered for the air force.
Rheinmetall MSP500 or MSP600	Germany	(illustration)	Passive electro-optical and infrared sensor	0 (4 on order)	Being added with the modernisation.
Communication nodes	Norway	—	Nodal communications systems	0 (3 on order)	Added to the NASAMS 2+ systems, 3 ordered for the Army. Note: 1 additional ordered for the air force.
Missiles
AIM-120 C5 AMRAAM	United States Norway		Radar guided missile	Unknown	6 missiles per launcher.
AIM-120 C8 AMRAAM	United States Norway		Radar guided missile	0 (on order)	Additional missiles for NASAMS and for the air force.
AIM-120ER AMRAAM	United States Norway		Radar guided missile	0 (potential purchase)	Being considered for longer range and speed.
Vehicles
Iveco-Pegaso M.250.37W & WM	Italy Spain	—	6×6 transport truck	Unknown (current fleet)	Transporting the missile launchers and the fire control units.
—	—	—	6×6 and 8×8 transport truck	Unknown (future fleet)	Future trucks to transport elements of the NASAMS system and to transport the munitions.
Uro VAMTAC ST5	Spain	—	4×4 armoured vehicle	Unknown (future fleet)	Armoured vehicle to transport personnels.

==== MBDA Mistral ====
Model	Origin	Image	Type	Quantity	Notes
MBDA Mistral	France		V/SHORAD	168	Mistral missile launchers. Orders: 1988, 640 missiles Mistral 1, and 168 launchers; 2021, 91 Mistral 3 from French stockpile; 2023, > 522 Mistral 3 (newly built); 2025: Indra to modernise it with a modern IFF system.
MBDA Mistral - URO Vamtac	France Spain		Mobile V/SHORAD systems	Unknown (10 on order)	Used to protect the NASAMS fire units. Installed on the URO Vamtac. 2025: Indra to modernise it with a modern IFF system.
Simulator
SMPB Mistral - simulator Simulador Portátil todo tiempo para Misil Mistral	Spain		MANPAD simulator	5	System supplied by Adaptive Systems.

==== Oerlikon GDF-007 ====
Model	Origin	Image	Type	Calibre	Quantity	Notes
Fire unit
Cañón AAA 35/90 GDF-007	Switzerland Spain		SHORAD Short range air-defence	35×228mm	45	Purchased in the 1970s, with the SuperFledermaus FCS (fire control system). T In the years 2000s, the FCS was retired and replaced by a Spanish system the canons were modernised. Some of the canons were refurbished to launch Aspide missiles (reusing the same chassis and actuators to rotate the turret and to manage the angle. Each fire unit currently in service is uses: 1 FCS (the SkyGuard or the SkyDor); 2 GDF-007 guns
Fire control systems
SkyGuard	Switzerland		FCS Fire control system	—	18	Used with two effectors: 1 Aspide missile launcher; 1 Oerlikon GDF-007; The Aspide launchers were retired.
SkyDor	Switzerland Spain	(Same sensor on a ship)	FCS Fire control system	—	27	Developed by Oerlikon Contraves with Izar (now known as Navantia) between 2000 and 2007. It is made of: 1 FDC (fire direction center), a command post with 2 operators; 1 SU (sensor unit) made of a radar, an optronic sensor system, and oprical guidance; Ths FDC reuses the SkyGuard and the sensor unit uses the Dorna system from Navantia. Modernisations: 2022: 2024: Indra to modernise it with a modern IFF system with a IFF5/S system.; 2025: corrective maintenance.
LPD-20	Switzerland Spain		Early warnning radar, low / very low altitude	—	—	
Canon
Oerlikon GDF-007 Cañón AAA 35/90 GDF-007	Switzerland Spain		Anti-air autocannon	35×228mm	92	GDF-002 acquired in the 1970s, modernised in several phases to the GDF-005 and then GDF-007 standard in the 2000s by SAPA in collaboration with Rheinmetall Air Defence. The modern variant was modified: Auto loader with more rounds; New cockpit; A generator added; 3D target tracking microprocessor connected to a Gun King optronic sight and a laser rangefinder.; Fires the AHEAD timed airburst ammunitions
Ammunitions
Rheinmetall Air Defence AHEAD Advanced hit efficiency and destruction	Switzerland	—	Anti-air airburst ammunition	35×228mm	—	Vairants: PMD062, original round with 152 sub-projectiles (anti-aircraft, anti-missile); PMD330, configured for C-RAM with 407 sub-projectiles; PMD428, configured for C-UAS with 675 sub-projectiles
Vehicles
Iveco-Pegaso M320 6×6	Italy Spain		Tactical transport truck	—	—	Towing and transporting the equipment for the fire units.

== Equipment on order ==
=== Air defence weapons ===
==== MIM 104 Patriot PAC-3 + ====
The new fire units were ordered in July 2024.

Model	Origin	Type	Quantity	Notes
Fire units
MIM-104 Patriot PAC-3+	United States	Medium to long range air defence fire unit	0 (+ 4 on order)	Order in July 2024
Fire units composition
M903	United States	Launching station (TEL) Transporter erector launcher	0 (+ 24 on order)	6 launchers per fire unit, capable to launch up to 4 PAC-2 GEM-T, or 12 PAC-3 MSE missiles.
AN/MSQ-132 ECS Engagement Control Station	United States	Tactical command and control	0 (+ 4 on order)	New command-and control station, 1 per PAC-3+ fire unit.
ICS information coordination central	United States	Strategic command and control	0 (+ 2 on order)	Coordination centers between the fire units.
AN/MPQ-65	United States	AESA, GaN, fire-control radar Active electronically scanned array	0 (+ 4 on order)	1 radar system per PAC-3+ fire unit- The system is made of a radar, an IFF and an ECCM and track-via-missile.
OE-349 Antenna Mast Group	United States Spain	Transmission station (UHF communications array)	0 (+ 8 on order)	2 directional transmission systems per fire units. Transmitting data from the ECS to the launchers.
Vincorion Patriot generators	Germany	Electrical power plant for radar	0 (+ 8 on order)	
Missiles
PAC-2 GEM-T Patriot Advanced Capability-2 -Guidance Enhanced Missile	United States Germany Spain	SAM missile - anti-aircraft / anti-ballistic - long range Surface-to-air	Unknnown (+ 200 on order)	Order in January 2024. 1,000 missiles ordered in common with Germany, the Netherlands and Romania, to be manufactured in Europe, assembled in Germany in an agreement between Raytheon and MBDA Deutschland, Sener will also produce some parts.
PAC-3 MSE Patriot Advanced Capability-3 - Missile Segment Enhancement	United States Spain	SAM missile - anti-aircraft / anti-ballistic - medium range Surface-to-air	0 (+ 51 on order)	Agreement signed in July 2024 for the purchase of the PAC-3 MSE missile. Lockheed Martin collaborates with Sener and Oesía-Tecnobit on the production of the missile.

== See also ==
- Structure of the Spanish Army
