= Francisco Javier Cabo =

Francisco Javier Cabo (1768, Náquera – 1832, Valencia) was a Spanish singer, organist, and chapel master at the Valencia Cathedral. He was a modern composer of masses, vespers, and other works in the a capella style.
