= Loriguilla =

- Municipality
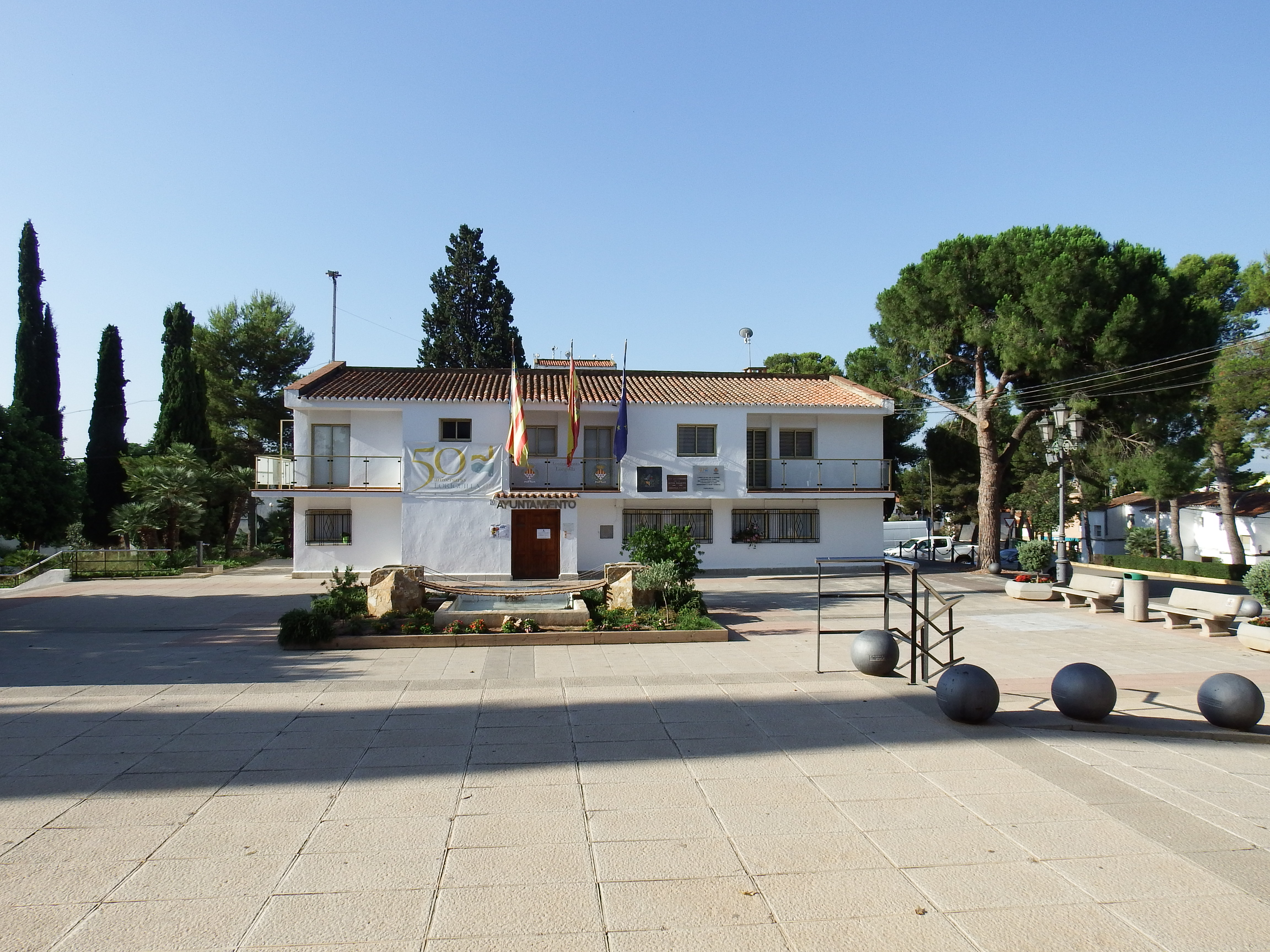
- Town hall

- Coat of arms

- Location in Spain
- Coordinates: 39°29′24.95″N 0°34′13.55″W
- Country: Spain
- Autonomous community: Valencian Community
- Province: Valencia
- Comarca: Camp de Túria
- Judicial district: Llíria

Government
  - Alcalde: Montserrat Cervera

Area
  - Total: 72.4 km^{2} (28.0 sq mi)
- Elevation: 110 m (360 ft)

Population (2025-01-01)
  - Total: 2,188
  - Density: 30.2/km^{2} (78.3/sq mi)
- Time zone: UTC+1 (CET)
  - Summer (DST): UTC+2 (CEST)
- Postal code: 46393
- Official language(s): Spanish
- Website: Official website

Loriguilla is a municipality in the comarca of Camp de Túria in the Valencian Community, Spain.

== See also ==
- Sierra de Utiel
- List of municipalities in Valencia
