= Ermita de San Francisco, Nàquera =

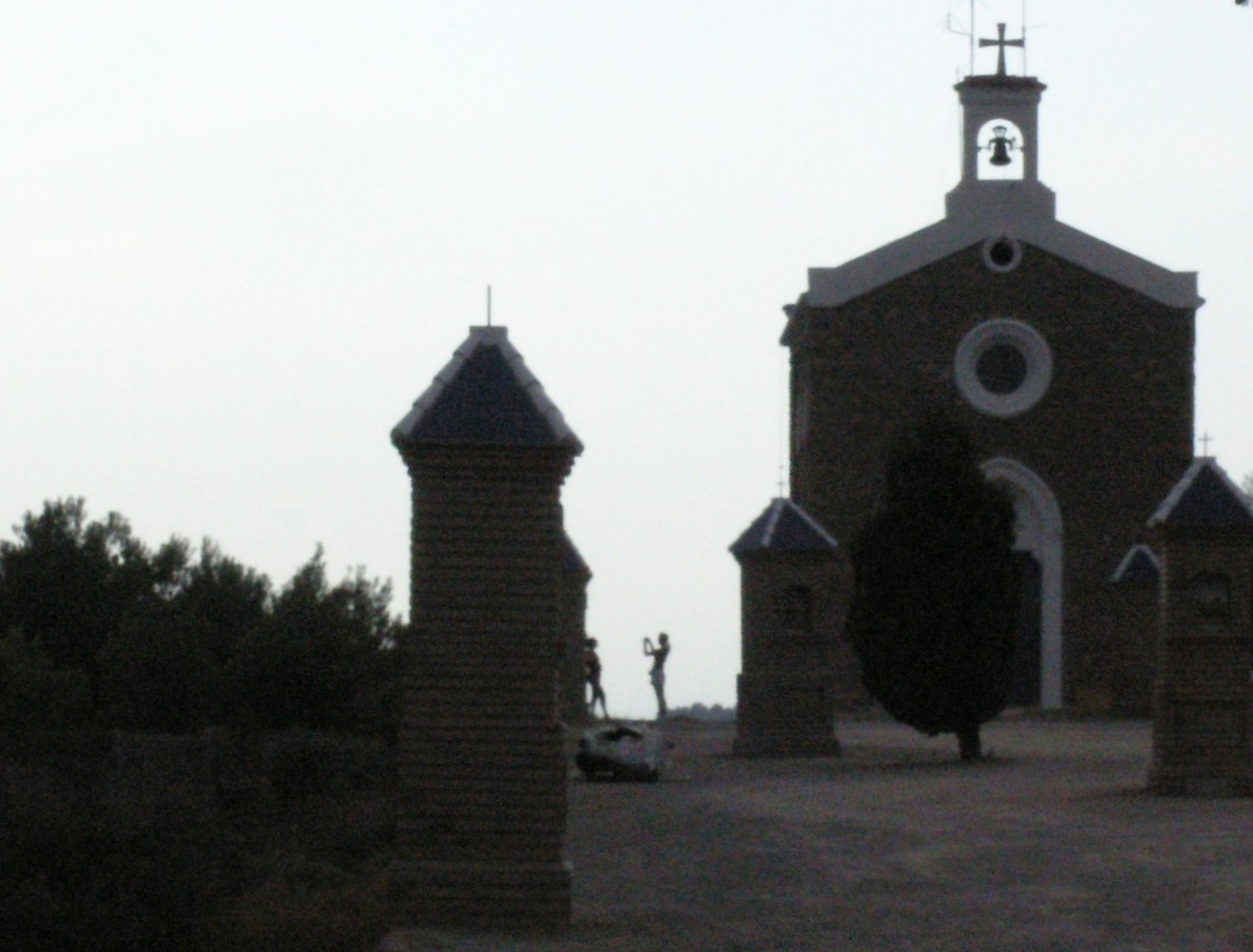
- San Francesc, Calvari
- Interactive map of the Ermita de San Francisco, Nàquera area

General information
- Type: Hermitage
- Location: Nàquera, Valencia, Spain
- Construction started: 1964
- Completed: 1980
- Inaugurated: 1969

The Ermita de San Francisco (Hermitage of St Francis) is a Neogothic-style, Roman Catholic hermitage located in Nàquera, province of Valencia, Spain.

== History ==
The original hermitage was called Ermita de la Rapita. It contained altarpiece of San Francisco and another dedicated to the Virgen del los Desamparados (Our Lady of those without Shelter). The walls were smooth and decorated with blue paint.

This small chapel was known to exist by 1608 when it was also called hermitage of San Vicente. This chapel fell into ruin and a new church was begun in 1912–13, but soon collapsed. A new chapel was built 1917 to 1921 in a Gothic Revival architecture. The interior is austere, with a neo-gothic altar carved in the 20th century.
