= Benissanó =

- Municipality
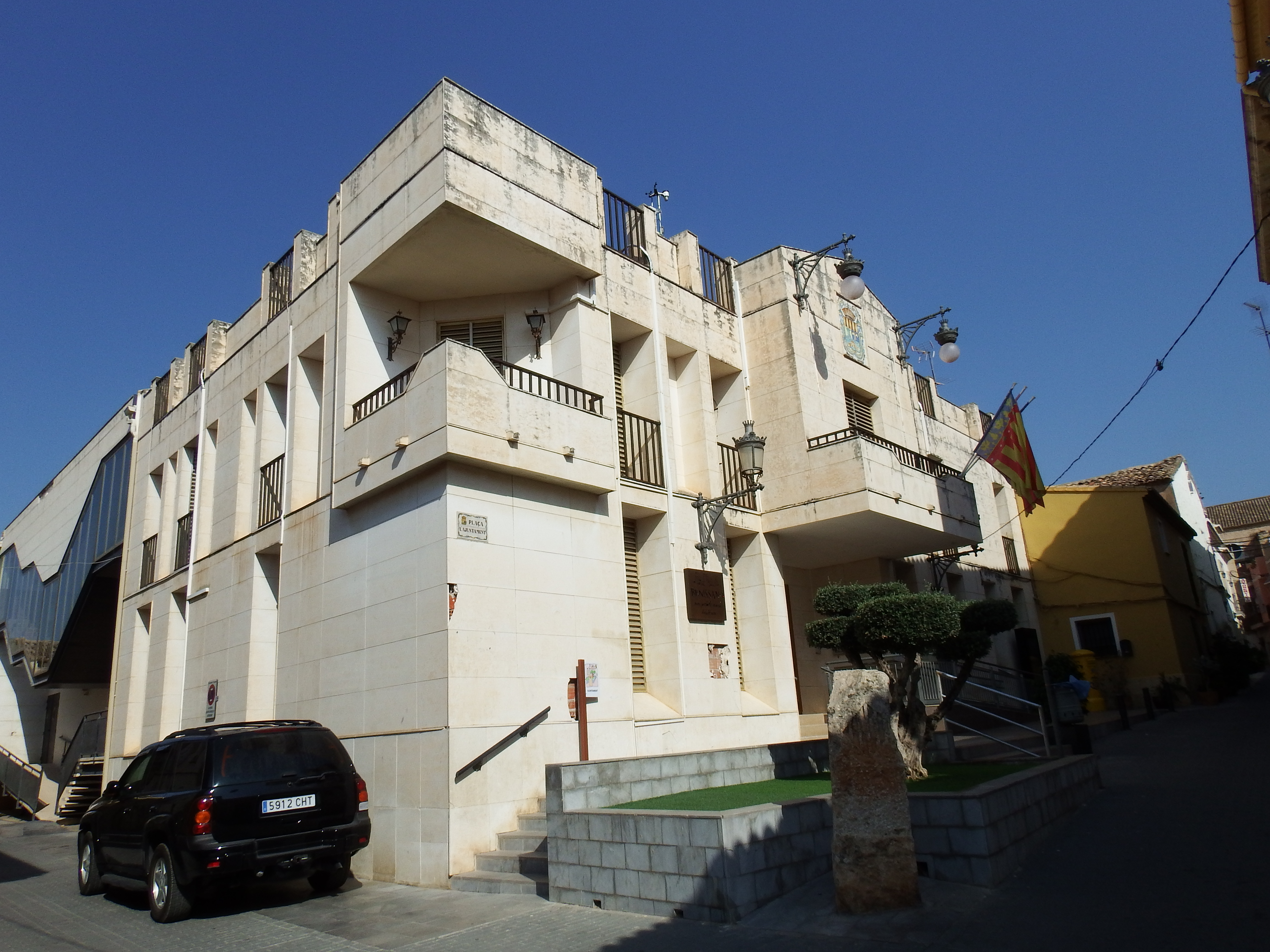
- Town hall

- Flag Coat of arms

- Location in Spain
- Coordinates: 39°36′49″N 0°34′40″W
- Country: Spain
- Autonomous community: Valencian Community
- Province: Valencia
- Comarca: Camp de Túria
- Judicial district: Llíria

Government
  - Alcalde: Isabel Castellano Brell (2007) (PP)

Area
  - Total: 2.3 km^{2} (0.89 sq mi)
- Elevation: 70 m (230 ft)

Population (2025-01-01)
  - Total: 2,449
  - Density: 1,100/km^{2} (2,800/sq mi)
- Demonym(s): Benissanero, benissanera
- Time zone: UTC+1 (CET)
  - Summer (DST): UTC+2 (CEST)
- Postal code: 46181
- Official language(s): Valencian
- Website: Official website

Benissanó is a municipality in the comarca of Camp de Túria in the Valencian Community, Spain.

== Geography ==
Located at the southeast of the city of Llíria, Benissanó is surrounded by the four cardinal points. The surface is flat, except for some gentle undulations in the northeastern area. The climate is temperate; the most frequent winds are westerly and easterly; rains occur in autumn and spring. The village is located on a mezzanine, next to the road from Valencia to Ademús.

== See also ==
- List of municipalities in Valencia
