= Casinos, Spain =

Casinos
- Municipality
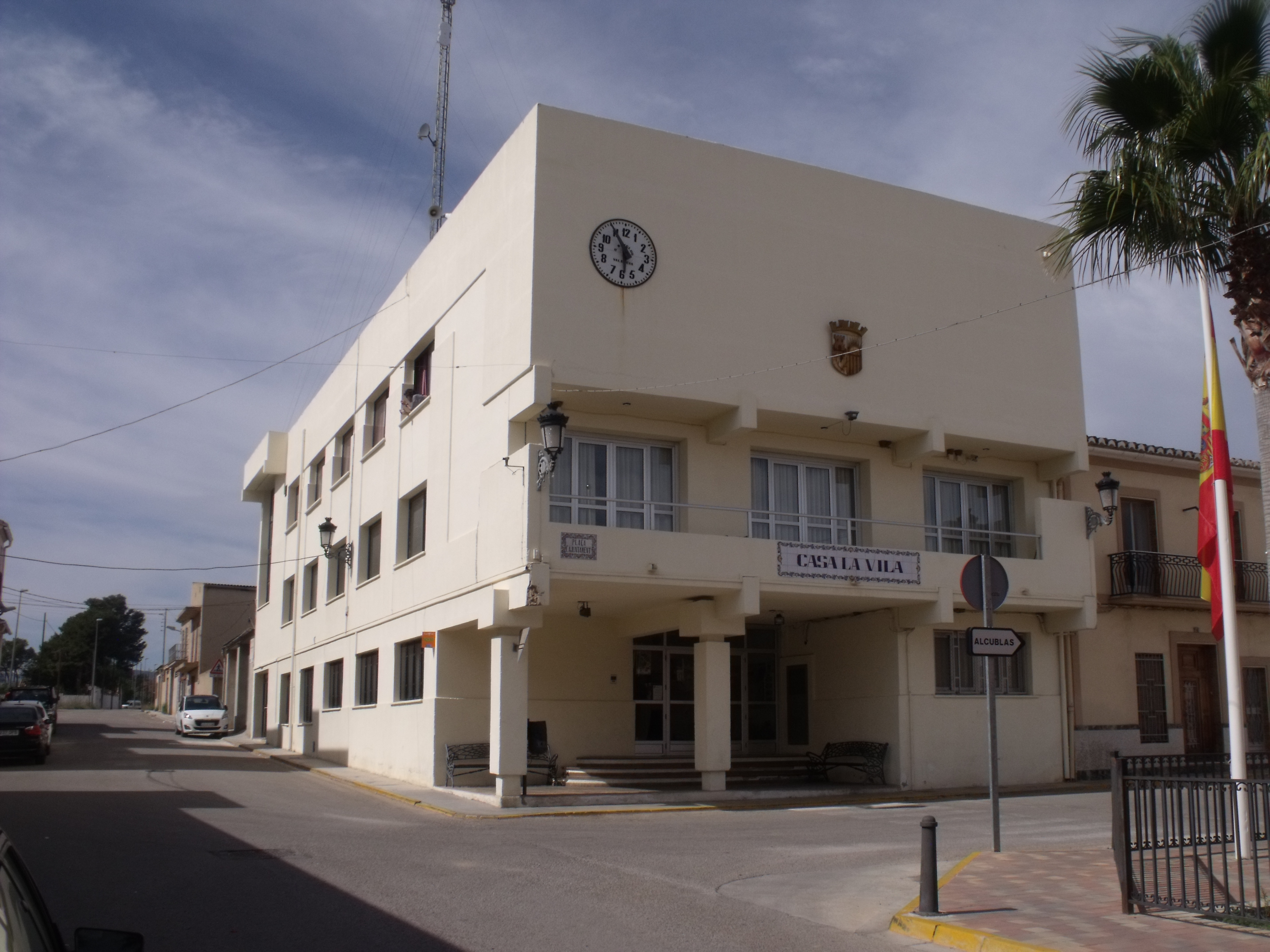
- Town hall

- Coat of arms

- Location in Spain
- Coordinates: 39°42′2″N 0°42′26″W
- Country: Spain
- Autonomous community: Valencian Community
- Province: Valencia
- Comarca: Camp de Túria
- Judicial district: Llíria

Government
  - Alcalde: Miguel Espinosa Garcia (2007) (PP)

Area
  - Total: 41.5 km^{2} (16.0 sq mi)
- Elevation: 288 m (945 ft)

Population (2025-01-01)
  - Total: 3,153
  - Density: 76.0/km^{2} (197/sq mi)
- Demonym(s): Casiner, casinera
- Time zone: UTC+1 (CET)
  - Summer (DST): UTC+2 (CEST)
- Postal code: 46171
- Official language(s): Valencian and Spanish
- Website: Official website

Casinos is a municipality in the comarca of Camp de Túria in the Valencian Community, Spain.

== Dragées and Spanish Nougat ==
Casinos is a village that still has the famous tradition of production of Sugared almonds, dragées (Peladillas) and Spanish Nougat, Turrón, Torró de Casinos.

== See also ==
- Sugared almonds
- Valencian cuisine
- Valencian Community
- Turrón
- Dragées
- List of municipalities in Valencia
