= Riba-roja de Túria =

Riba-roja de Túria Ribarroja del Turia
- Municipality
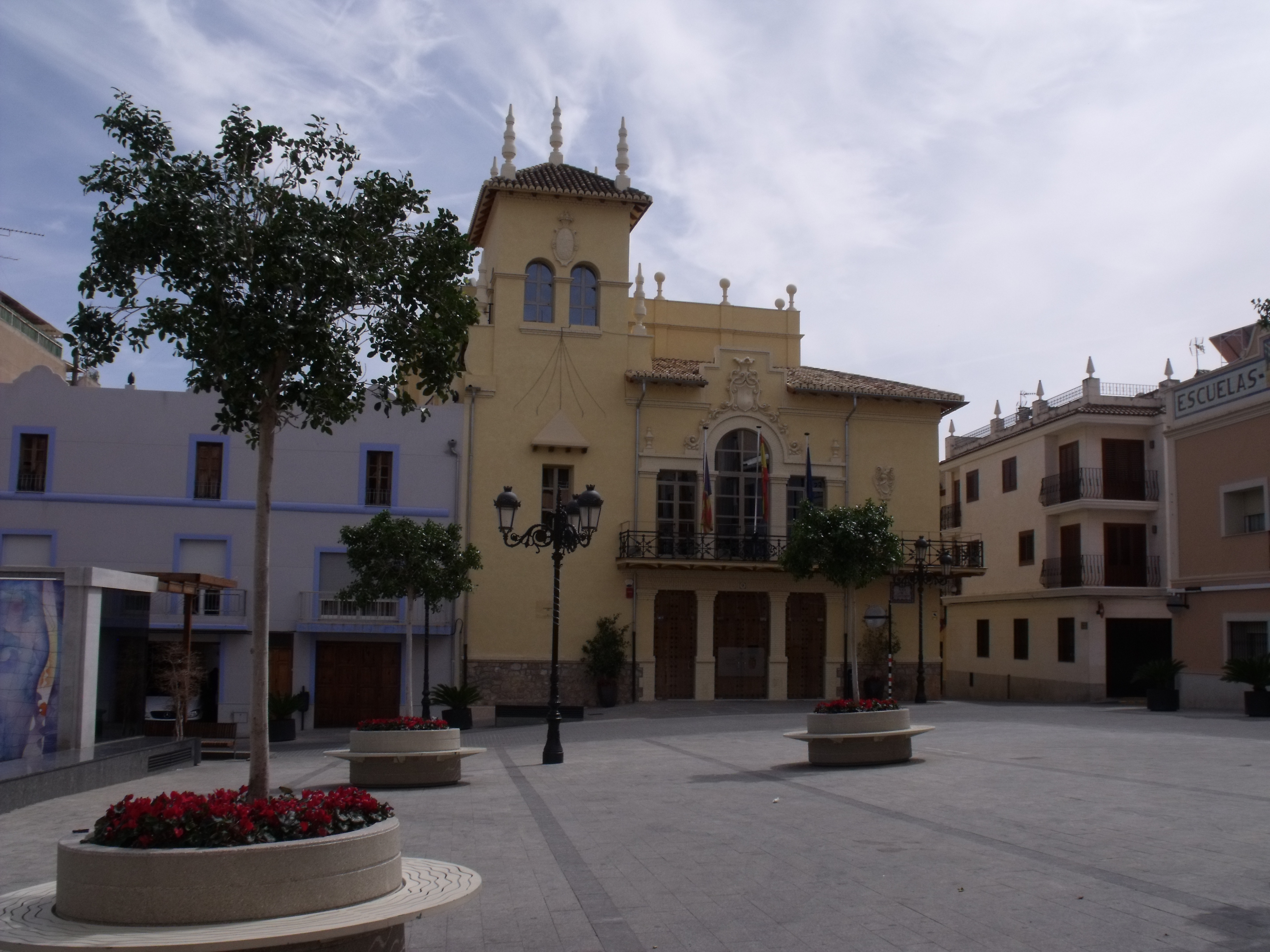
- Town hall

- Coat of arms

- Location in Spain
- Coordinates: 39°32′51″N 0°34′6″W
- Country: Spain
- Autonomous community: Valencian Community
- Province: Valencia
- Comarca: Camp de Túria
- Judicial district: Llíria

Government
  - Alcalde: Robert Raga Gadea (PSPV)

Area
  - Total: 57.5 km^{2} (22.2 sq mi)
- Elevation: 125 m (410 ft)

Population (2025-01-01)
  - Total: 24,616
  - Density: 428/km^{2} (1,110/sq mi)
- Demonym(s): riba-roger, -a (Val.) ribarrojero, -a (Sp.)
- Time zone: UTC+1 (CET)
  - Summer (DST): UTC+2 (CEST)
- Postal code: 46190
- Official language(s): Valencian; Spanish
- Website: Official website

Riba-roja de Túria (Valencian: [ˌribaˈrɔdʒa ðe ˈtuɾia], also [ˌribaˈrɔdʒɔ ðe ˈtuɾia]; Spanish: Ribarroja del Turia [riβaˈroxa ðel ˈtuɾja]) is a municipality in the comarca of Camp de Túria in the Valencian Community, Spain. Its population is 21,992 inhabitants (INE 2018).

Riba-roja is located to the side of the river Turia. It is also known of the archaeological sites of El Pla del Nadal. The site preserves part of a Visigothic building from the second half of the 7th century discovered in 1970 while carrying out agricultural activities. Roman and Byzantine archaeological artefacts facts have been found at the site, as well as Visigothic archaeological artefacts.

Another site that can be found in this town is the archaeological site of Pallantia or Valencia la Vieja (València la Vella in Valencian), with code 46.11.214-007. Specialists have even dated the site to the Visigothic or late Roman period.

== See also ==
- List of municipalities in Valencia
