= Serra, Spain =

Serra
- Municipality
- Flag Coat of arms

- Location in Spain
- Coordinates: 39°41′8″N 0°25′47″W
- Country: Spain
- Autonomous community: Valencian Community
- Province: Valencia
- Comarca: Camp de Túria
- Judicial district: Llíria

Government
  - Alcalde: Javier Arnal Gimeno

Area
  - Total: 57.3 km^{2} (22.1 sq mi)
- Elevation: 330 m (1,080 ft)

Population (2025-01-01)
  - Total: 3,767
  - Density: 65.7/km^{2} (170/sq mi)
- Demonym(s): Serratí, Serratina
- Time zone: UTC+1 (CET)
  - Summer (DST): UTC+2 (CEST)
- Postal code: 46118
- Official language(s): Valencian
- Website: Official website

Serra (Valencian pronunciation: [ˈsɛra]) is a municipality in the comarca of Camp de Túria in the Valencian Community, Spain.

== See also ==
- List of municipalities in Valencia
