= Francisco Pitarch =

Spanish footballer (1928–1977)

Personal information
- Full name: Francisco Pitarch Dellà
- Date of birth: 24 February 1927
- Place of birth: El Prat de Llobregat, Spain
- Date of death: 14 June 1977 (aged 50)
- Place of death: Spain
- Position: Forward

Youth career
- Academia Práctica
- Marina

Senior career*
Years	Team	Apps	(Gls)
1942–1943	CD Prat		
1943–1944	Mataró		
1944–1945	Tarrasense		
1945	Barcelona Amateur		
1945–1949	Mataró		
1949–1950	Melilla		
1950–1953	Real Zaragoza	32	(7)
1953–1955	Lleida		
1955–1956	Hércules	12	(2)
1956–1958	Elche de la Cooperativa		
1958–1960	Calvo Sotelo de Puertollano		
1960–1961	Orihuela Deportiva		
Total		44	(9)
- * Club domestic league appearances and goals

Francisco Pitarch Dellà (24 February 1927 – 14 June 1977) was a Spanish footballer who played as a forward for Real Zaragoza in the early 1950s.

== Early life ==
Francisco Pitarch was born in the Catalonian municipality of El Prat de Llobregat on 24 February 1927, as the youngest of six siblings from the marriage formed by Domingo and Vicenta, two Castellón natives who had moved to Llobregat to work as a horse-drawn cart driver and also to make pitchers, with his mother being even known as "the pitcher". One of his older brothers, Antoniet, died in the Spanish Civil War.

== Career ==
Pitarch began his football career in the youth ranks of Academia Práctica and then with Marina, from which he joined CD Prat's first team in 1942, aged 15, where he earned 10 pesetas per game and one duro for each goal scored. He was a very agile and fast winger, partly thanks to his slender build of 1.65 meters in height and 60 kilos in weight, being elegant both on and off the field, as he constantly combed his wavy hair.

After leaving Prat, Pitarch played one season at both Mataró (1943–44) and Tarrasense (1944–45), where he quickly stood out from the rest, thus caughting the attention of FC Barcelona, which signed him for their Amateur team in 1945, aged 18, but he was unable to handle the leap in quality, so he then returned to Mataró, with whom he played for four years, from 1945 until 1949. While he was carrying out his mandatory military service, he played for Melilla in the 1949–50 season, scoring 28 goals in 43 games and thus having a crucial in helping them achieve promotion to the Second Division. after which he joined Real Zaragoza, then in the Segunda División. In his first season at the club, he helped his side to a runner-up finish in the league, thus achieving promotion to the top flight, making his La Liga debut at Torrero on 14 October 1951, starting alongside Elemér Berkessy in a 2–1 victory over Real Valladolid. He stayed at Zaragoza for three years, from 1950 until 1953, scoring 7 goals in 32 La Liga matches.

In 1953, Pitarch and fellow Zaragoza teammate Ricardo Calo signed for second division team Lleida, where he played for two years, until 1955, when he joined Hércules, then in the top flight, but in his first (and only) season there, the club was relegated. In total, he scored 9 goals in 44 La Liga matches. In 1956, Pitarch joined Elche de la Cooperativa, where he played for two years. In 1958, he moved to Calvo Sotelo de Puertollano, where he also played for two years, until 1960, when he went to Orihuela Deportiva, where he retired in 1961, aged 34. During his second season at Calvo Sotelo, Pitarch uncharacteristically assaulted a linesman in a match against Villarrobledo on 20 September 1959, which resulted in a 19-match suspension, later reduced to eight.

== Personal life ==
Outside football, Pitarch has been described as a cheerful and boastful person, who took great care of his clothing and personal image, as well as an sensitive person who enjoyed poetry, which he read and wrote during team trips, with many of his teammates taking advantage of that to ask him to write their letters to their girlfriends, something which he also did to his own girlfriend, Montse, a El Prat native who later became his wife, and with whom he had three children: Lidia, Yolanda and Paquito. After retiring, he and his family settled in Alicante, where he set up a hair salon for his wife. Following a love disappointment, however, he felt so betrayed and deceived that his sensitivity took over to the point of reaching self-destruction through alcoholism, which set up the grounds for his wife to leave him for France, taking their three children with her.

== Death ==
After a few months of struggling with drinking problems prompted by his depressive loneliness, Pitarch decided to return to his hometown, where his mother and much of his family live, but on the morning of 14 June 1977, he left his mother's house, stating that he was "going to Barceloneta for a swim. I'm in the mood. I'm meeting some friends. Don't worry if I'm late because I intend to spend the whole day there". However, he ended up committing suicide by throwing himself into the sea from the Barceloneta breakwater, with the police finding a handwritten note from him in one of the beach lockers.
