= San Antonio de Benagéber =

Sant Antoni de Benaixeve
- Municipality
- San Antonio de Benagéber
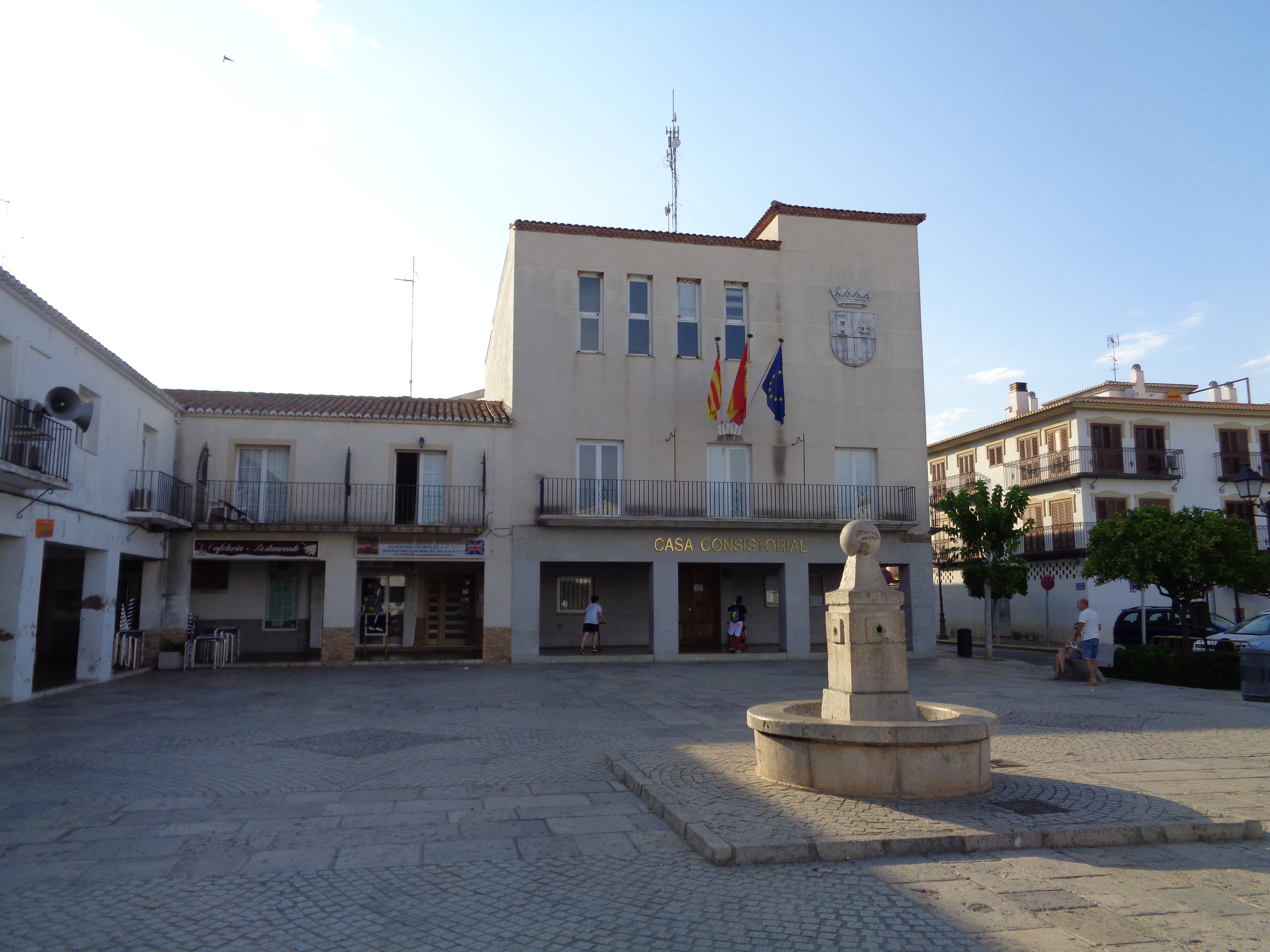
- The municipal council of Sant Antoni de Benagéber

- Coat of arms

- Location in Spain
- Coordinates: 39°33.7′N 0°30′W
- Province: Valencia
- Comarca: Camp de Túria
- Judicial district: Paterna
- Founded: 1957

Government
  - Alcalde: Enrique Santafosta Giner (AISAB)

Area
  - Total: 8.74 km^{2} (3.37 sq mi)

Population (2025-01-01)
  - Total: 11,192
  - Density: 1,280/km^{2} (3,320/sq mi)
- Demonym: Sanantoniano/a
- Time zone: UTC+1 (CET)
  - Summer (DST): UTC+2 (CEST)
- Postal code: 46184
- Official language(s): Spanish, Catalan
- Website: Official website

San Antonio de Benagéber, Valencian: Sant Antoni de Benaixeve, is a municipality in the comarca of Camp de Túria in the Valencian Community, Spain.

== Geography ==
The municipality of San Antonio de Benagéber it is located at 14 km. of the city of Valencia.

=== Neighborhoods and districts ===
In the municipality of San Antonio de Benagéber are also the following towns:

- Urbanización Montesano.
- Urbanización Colinas de San Antonio.
- Urbanización Cumbres de San Antonio.
- Urbanización de San Vicente.
- Zona del Pla del Pou

== See also ==
- List of municipalities in Valencia
