= Nàquera / Náquera =

Nàquera Nàquera (Valencian) Náquera (Spanish)
- Municipality
- Nàquera / Náquera
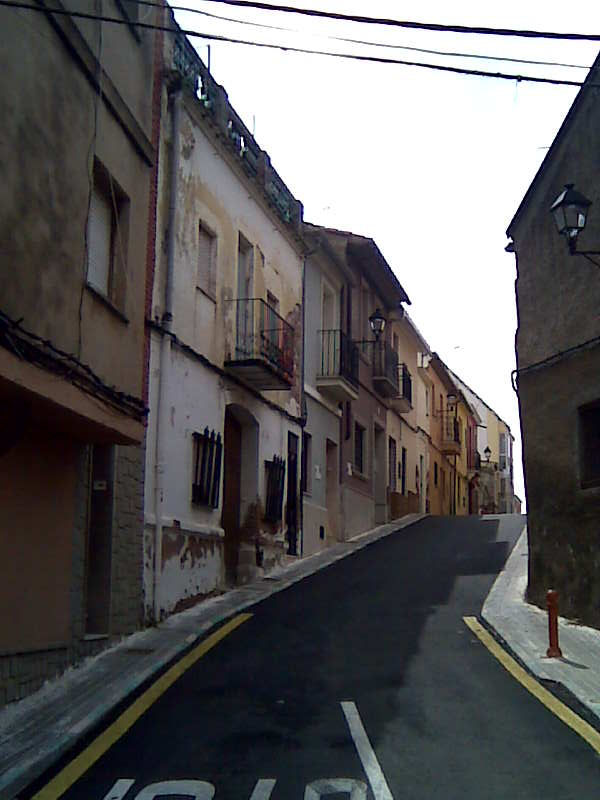
- Street in Náquera.jpg

- Flag Coat of arms

- Location in Spain
- Coordinates: 39°39′29″N 0°25′27″W
- Country: Spain
- Autonomous community: Valencian Community
- Province: Valencia
- Comarca: Camp de Túria
- Judicial district: Llíria

Government
  - Alcalde: Damián Ibañez (UPdN)

Area
  - Total: 38.7 km^{2} (14.9 sq mi)
- Elevation: 242 m (794 ft)

Population (2025-01-01)
  - Total: 8,556
  - Density: 221/km^{2} (573/sq mi)
- Demonym(s): Naquerà, Naquerana
- Time zone: UTC+1 (CET)
  - Summer (DST): UTC+2 (CEST)
- Postal code: 46119
- Official language(s): Valencian
- Website: Official website

Nàquera (in Valencian: Nàquera and in Spanish: Náquera) is a municipality in the region (comarca) of Camp de Túria in the Valencian Community, Spain; placed in the NE of the province of Valencia at a distance of 24 km from Valencia (capital city). The main church is Nuestra Señora de la Encarnación.

== Location ==
Located at the foothills of the Sierra Calderona, it is known as the "door to the Calderona". The town is placed on the side of a mound of 215 m of altitude, split by the Naquera Creek; it is accessed through agricultural areas and residential suburbs, composed of little villas or chalets, mainly inhabited on weekends and during summer holidays. The area of the municipal term is 3870 ha, of which 1020 ha (26% of the total area) are within the limits of the Natural Park of the Sierra Calderona all located on the piedmont.

== Climate ==
Its climate is transitional Mediterranean steppe: cold and semiarid ( Köppen-Geiger: BSk), with a mild temperature of 16 °C on annual average, the highest daily average in August (be 33 °C) and the lowest in February (9 °C) and scarce rainfall (457mm) with high in October and low on July. This has favoured the agriculture, previously based on rainfed crops and nowadays citrus. The area of the non-cultivated term is very wooded, with abundant wildlife and a great diversity of autochthonous Mediterranean vegetation, such as the Holm Oak (Quercus Rotundifolia).

== Neighbouring towns ==
Náquera has municipal limits with Albalat de Tarongers (W), Bétera (S), Moncada (SW), Museros (E), El Puig (ENE), Rafelbunyol (NE), Sagunto (NNE), Segart y Serra (N) todas ellas en la provincia de Valencia.

== Access ==
This location can be accessed, from Valencia, through several options:

1) From the V-21 (Avenida de Cataluña), to Massalfassar (exit 9) CV-35 and then CV-305/315

2) From the Mediterranean Highway A-7 (exit 313 or 315 of Massamagrel/ Moncada/ Náquera) then CV-305/315 or the exit of Bétera (exit 321) and then CV-310 (coming from Godella)

3) By the way of Moncada using the CV-315 (Camino de Moncada, comes from Valencia).

4) From the Pista (highway) of Ademuz (exit 14 CV-336 to Bétera)

5) From the north can be accessed passing Serra from Torres-Torres by the CV-310 from the Mudejar Highway (A-23). This is a spectacular road that climbs up to 525 mts above sea level; with a small detour of 15 minutes, and a short walk, the Garbí can be visited.

== Notable Natives ==
- Francisco Javier Cabo (1768-1832), composer and musician

== See also ==
- Ermita de San Francisco
- List of municipalities in Valencia
