= Marines, Spain =

Marines
- Municipality
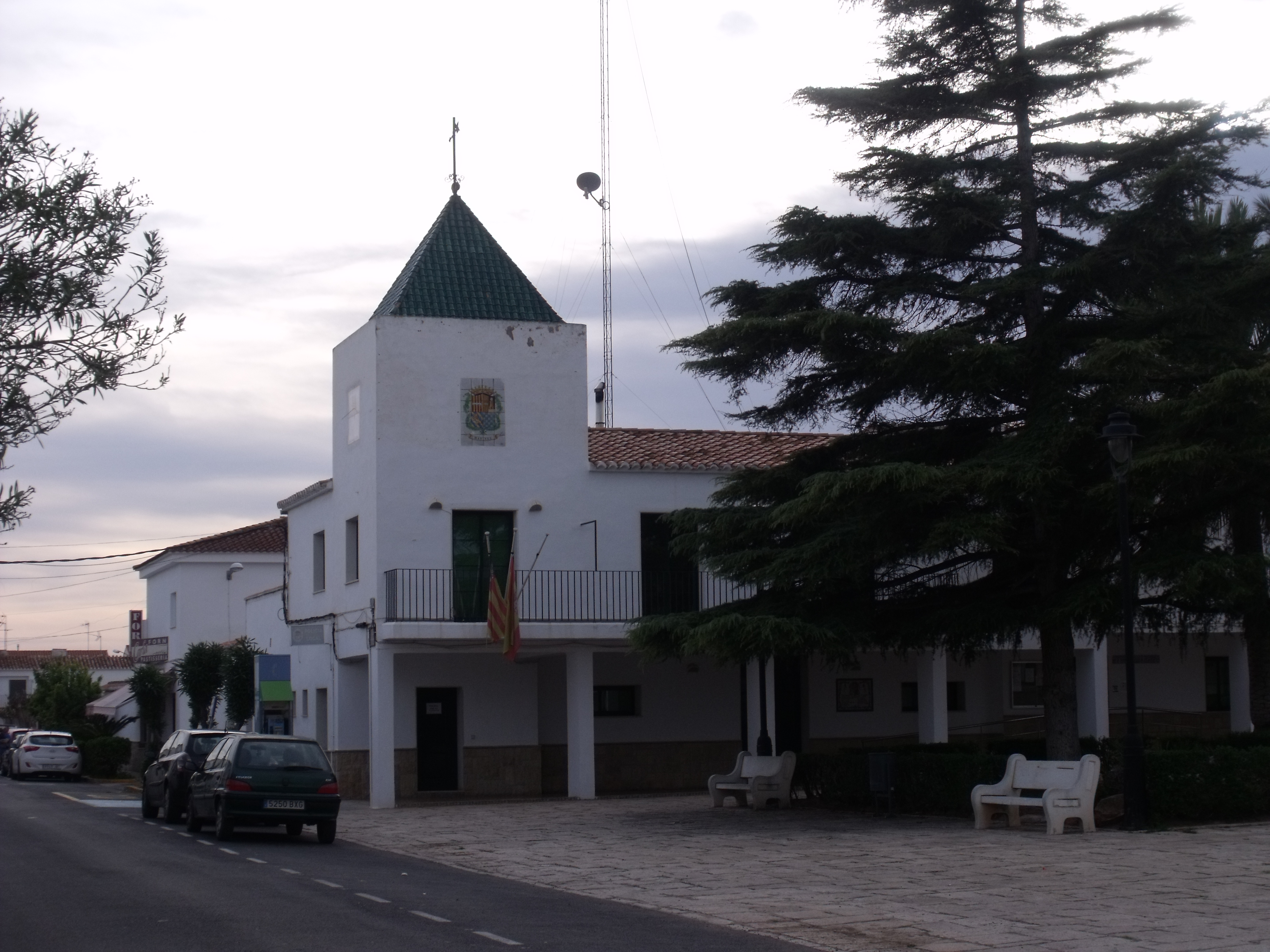
- Town hall

- Coat of arms

- Location in Spain
- Coordinates: 39°44′25″N 0°31′53″W
- Country: Spain
- Autonomous community: Valencian Community
- Province: Valencia
- Comarca: Camp de Túria
- Judicial district: Llíria

Government
  - Alcalde: Mª Dolores Celda Lluesma

Area
  - Total: 35.7 km^{2} (13.8 sq mi)
- Elevation: 300 m (980 ft)

Population (2025-01-01)
  - Total: 1,967
  - Density: 55.1/km^{2} (143/sq mi)
- Demonym: Marinense
- Time zone: UTC+1 (CET)
  - Summer (DST): UTC+2 (CEST)
- Postal code: 46163
- Official language(s): Spanish
- Website: Official website

Marines is a municipality in the comarca of Camp de Túria, in the province of Valencia, Valencian Community, Spain.

== Population ==
Demographic evolution
1990	1992	1994	1996	1998	2000	2002	2004	2005	2007
1.203	1.199	1.253	1.305	1.341	1.406	1.437	1.464	1.498	1.566

=== Main city and holiday colony ===
The town of Marines includes Marines Viejo, a holiday colony from the resettled original site of the town.

== See also ==
- List of municipalities in Valencia
