= La Pobla de Vallbona =

Settlement in Valencia, Spain

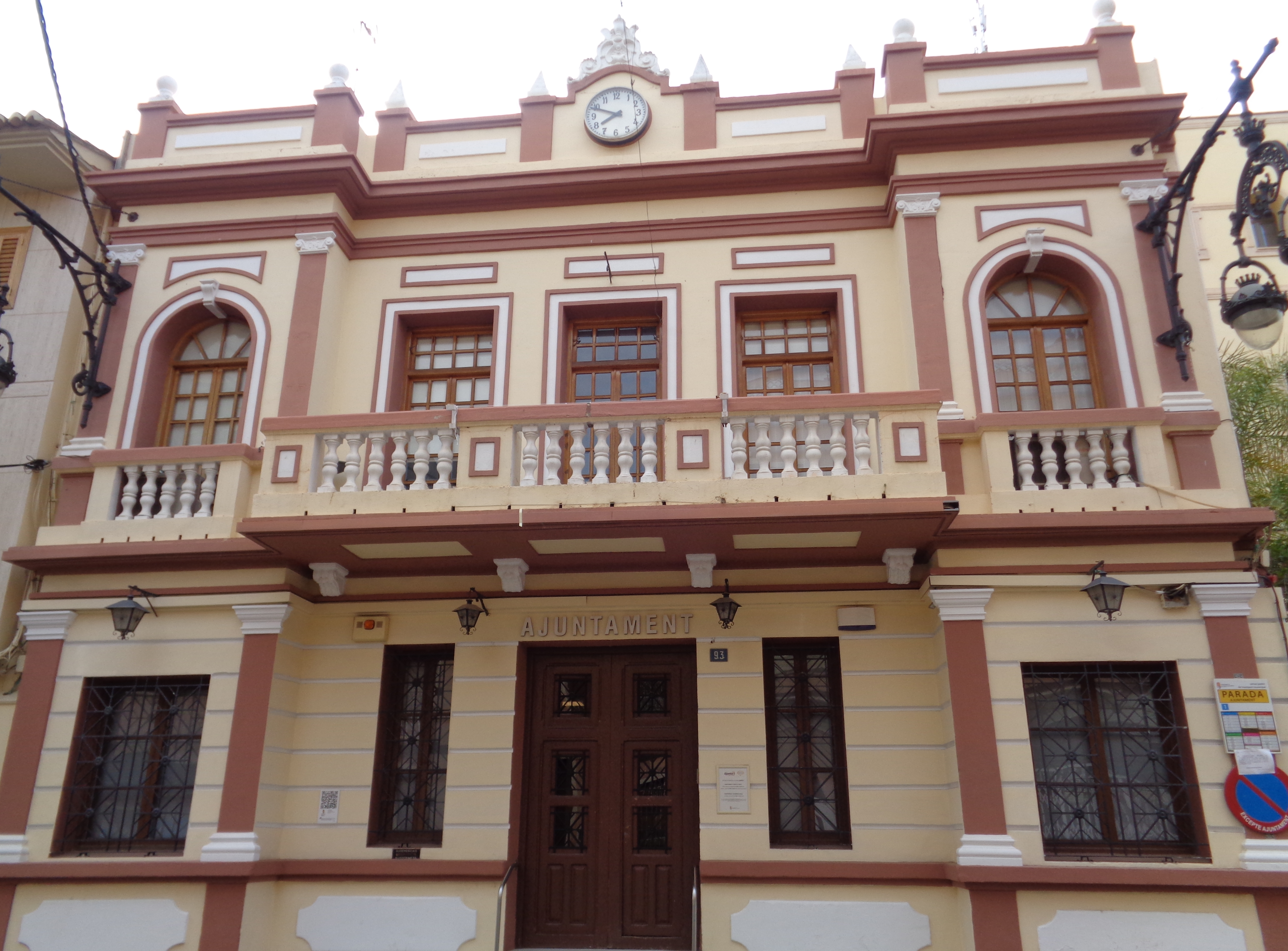
The Ajuntament

La Pobla de Vallbona, (Note: Pronunciation: Valencian: [la ˈpɔbla ðe ˌvaʎˈbɔna], also [la ˈpɔblɔ ðe ˌvaʎˈbɔnɔ]) known simply as La Pobla, is a town and municipality in the province of Valencia in the Valencian Community, Spain.

== History of the shield of La Pobla de Vallbona ==
The shield of La Pobla de Vallbona was mainly created to avoid fraud and mistakes with documents or authorizations that each mayor of the towns of Spain issued. In 1848 the government implied as an obligation to use a stamp (shield) with the goal of not confusing documents. This is when La Pobla de Vallbona decided to use the shield that has been used since 1975. The shield is divided in three parts. The first part that is the largest has the four bars of Aragon; thus this shows that the origins of the town were established taking into account Aragon's costumes. Then, there are two smaller divisions one have three moreres of sinople (three green trees); representing how abundant is the town with trees and agriculture. The last division has a blue background that indicates loyalty and also there is the “Caseriu de plata” (some kind of houses) that makes reference of the name “Pobla” that is the unique characteristic of the Vallbonenses: Loyalty. Lastly, one can see at the top the Royal Crown.

== Geography ==
Access to La Pobla de Vallbona can be either through the highway CV-35 or also through the Valencia Metro line 1.

== Neighborhoods ==
The municipality of La Pobla de Vallbona consists of the urban core and the following towns:

- Casa Blanca
- Camp del Túria
- Gallipont
- La Conarda
- Pla dels Aljubs
- Rascanya

== Economy ==
After the highway with access to Valencia was finished, the population almost doubled due to the proximity to the city. In general, this increased the local trade in the town. Additionally, the agriculture in the town throughout years has been abandoned. But, recently new farmers have been arriving and enriching the fields. Despite their small size, fields attract many visitors because they afford pleasant walks through crops such as oranges, orchards, mandarins, artichokes, onions and olives.

== Monuments ==
In La Pobla de Vallbona significant historical monuments include:

“Ermita de Sant Sebastià” (sculpture)

“Ermita Mas de Tous” (sculpture)

“Església Sant Jaume Apòstol” (church)

“Església de la Santíssima Trinitat i Sant Josep” (church)

“La Casa Bernal” (house)

“La Casa Gran” (house)

== Sports ==
Football La Pobla de Vallbona has a football club named “Atlético Vallbonense”. This club is recognized among the entire region because they have many teams in minor divisions that have made to the leagues. This team is usually small and since 2002 has been in category 2B.

Basketball The club of Basketball in La Pobla has a school funded recently. Nevertheless, it has been growing and it probably becomes a recognized team.

Valencian pilota La Pobla has been home to prominent players of the raspall variant of the game, among them Hèctor Coll Sebastià (Colau) and Pasqual Balaguer Catillo (Pasqual II). The town's trinquet is one of the stop-overs of the annual Professional League tour.

== See also ==
- List of municipalities in Valencia
