= Allied Land Forces Southern Europe =

Allied Land Forces Southern Europe (LANDSOUTH)
- Active: 1951 - 2004
- Allegiance: (NATO) North Atlantic Treaty Organization
- Part of: Allied Forces Southern Europe, Naples, Italy
- Headquarters: Carli Palace in Verona, Italy

Allied Land Forces Southern Europe (LANDSOUTH) was a military command of NATO's Allied Forces Southern Europe (AFSOUTH) command. Based in Verona in Northern Italy LANDSOUTH was tasked with defending Italy north of the Apennine Mountains against a Warsaw Pact or Yugoslavian invasion. Activated in 1951 under an Italian Army four-star general, the command was disbanded in 2004.

Commander, Allied Land Forces Southern Europe was a NATO Principal Subordinate Commander.

== History ==
Following the creation of NATO in 1949, the Italian military was integrated into NATO's Allied Forces Southern Europe (AFSOUTH) and prepared for a feared Soviet invasion from the east, possibly via Yugoslavia. Allied Land Forces Southern Europe (LANDSOUTH), was activated on 10 July 1951 to defend northeastern Italy and headquartered in the Carli Palace in Verona. Three infantry divisions and three brigades were the only forces initially available to this command to defend Northern Italy. The divisions in question were the Mantova Infantry Division in Udine, the Folgore Motorized Infantry Division in Treviso, the Trieste Motorized Infantry Division in Bologna. Two of the three brigades were Alpini mountain infantry brigades – the Julia Alpine Brigade in Cividale del Friuli and Tridentina Alpine Brigade in Brixen, while the third brigade was the Ariete Armoured Brigade in Pordenone.

From the mid-1950s the Portuguese Division "Nun´Álvares" was earmarked to reinforce the Italian forces in time of war.

The commanding general of LANDSOUTH was an Italian Generale di Corpo d'Armata, equal to a US Army four-star general, with an Italian two star general as Chief of Staff, an Italian one star general as head of operations and a US Army one star general as head of logistic support. LANDSOUTH was under the command of AFSOUTH in Naples and supported by the Allied Air Forces Southern Europe's (AIRSOUTH) Fifth Allied Tactical Air Force (5 ATAF) in Vicenza.

On 17 December 1981 in Verona, two members of the Italian terrorist organization the Red Brigades disguised themselves as plumbers to gain entry into the apartment of Brigadier General James L. Dozier, the then senior U.S. Army officer, and Deputy Chief of Staff of LANDSOUTH. Over the prior seven years, no hostages of the Red Brigades had been found alive. Ten days after the kidnapping, the Red Brigades released a photo of Dozier with a swollen left eye sitting in front of a banner with the Italian group's emblem, denouncing the general as an "assassin and hero of the American massacres in Vietnam" and announcing the start of his "proletarian trial." Dozier was rescued by NOCS, an Italian special force, with assistance from the Intelligence Support Activity's Operation Winter Harvest, after 42 days of captivity.

On 1 September 1999 LANDSOUTH was redesignated Joint Command South and took responsibility for a larger territory. Anticipating this step Italy had already created its own national command to replace LANDSOUTH: Operational Land Forces Command (COMFOTER) was activated on 1 October 1997 and took control of the Italian combat, combat support and signals formations. On 1 October 2004 Joint Command South was disbanded and its function absorbed by Allied Force Command Madrid.

=== Bunkers ===
In case of war with the Warsaw Pact LANDSOUTH would have moved to the "West Star" (Site B) bunker complex in Affi. Built between 1960 and 1966 West Star could support up to 500 people for 15 days without need for external supplies. The first bunker "Back Yard" (Site A) was the first NATO site built as a communications center with its 50 teletypes and KW7 encryption system, it managed all data and voice traffic with all bases in Italy and the rest of Europe, as described in the BackYard Major Relay reproduced and clearly visible inside the base, which can now be visited. was built between 1956 and 1958 in the village of Grezzana. Additionally in Soave a communications bunker was built (Site C), whose backup bunker was in Cavaion Veronese.

=== Structure ===
During the Cold War LANDSOUTH commanded the following Italian formations and units:

- Allied Land Forces Southern Europe
  - 3rd Army Corps
  - 4th Alpine Army Corps
  - 5th Army Corps
  - Anti-aircraft Artillery Command, in Padua
  - Military Region North-East, for the logistical support
  - Psychological Operations Battalion "Monte Grappa"
  - Mixed Signal Support Group (an air force and army mixed unit for communication with 5 ATAF)
  - 5th Allied Tactical Air Force (5th ATAF), in Vicenza (comprising all the combat wings of the Italian Air Force)
  - South European Task Force, constituted of the 3rd Battalion, 325th Airborne Infantry Regiment of the US Army, in Vicenza
- Land reinforcements that would have come under LANDSOUTH command in case of war
  - An army corps of the Spanish Army composed of two divisions, either armored/mechanized or mountain divisions as operationally required
  - 30th Mechanized Brigade, North Carolina Army National Guard
  - 1st Independent Mixed Brigade of the Portuguese Army

=== Badges of the Allied Land Forces Southern Europe ===
This is a gallery of the badges of the units under the command of Allied Land Forces Southern Europe.

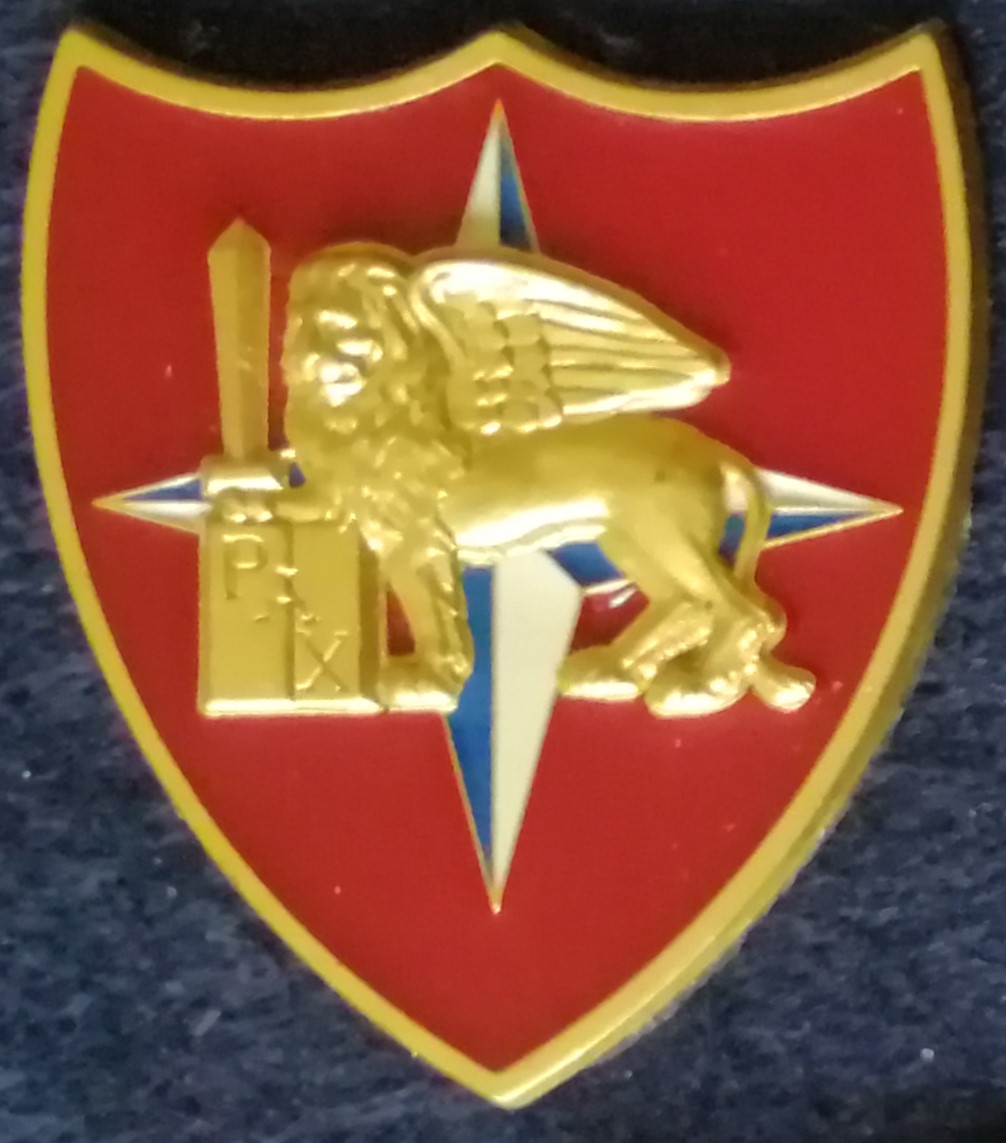
NATO LANDSOUTH badge

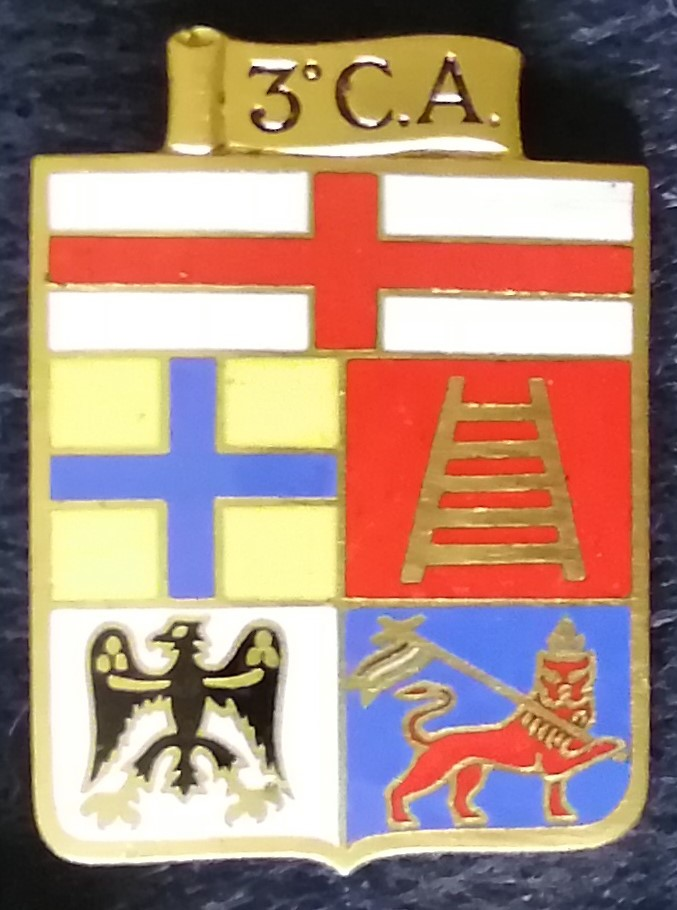
Badge of the 3rd Army Corps

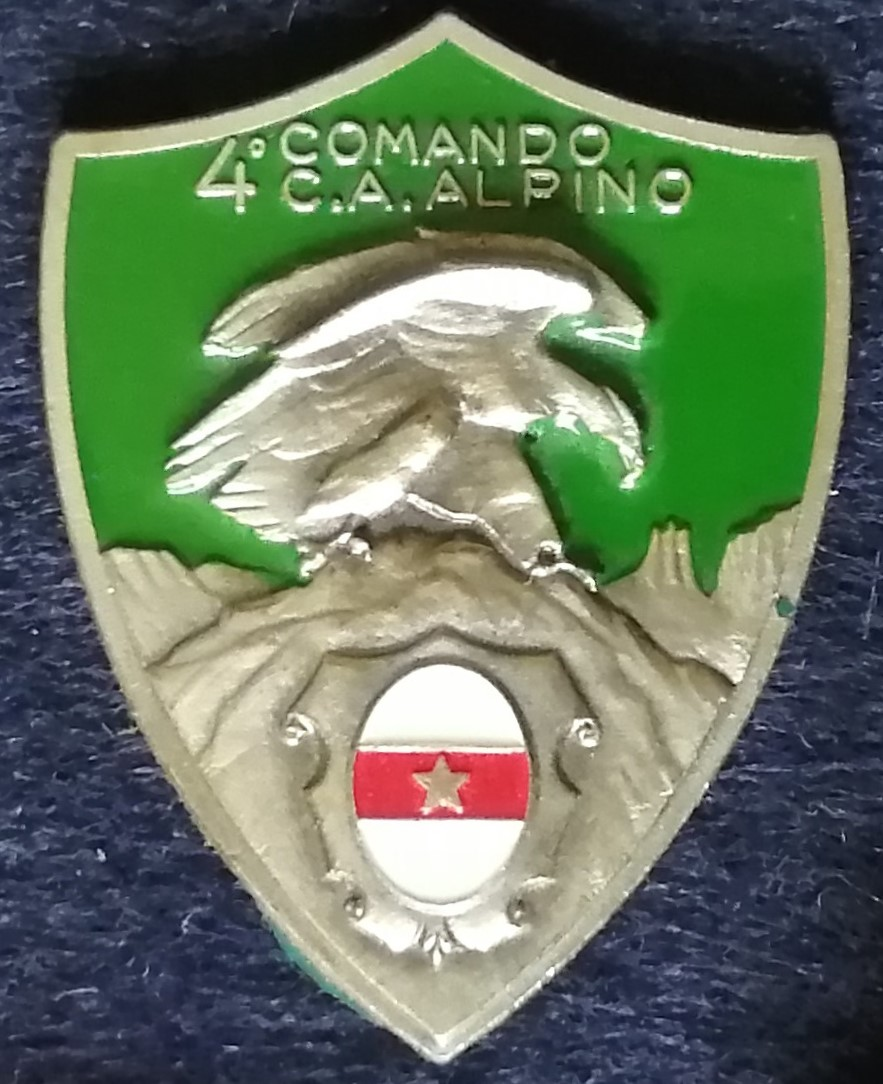
Badge of the 4th Alpine Army Corps

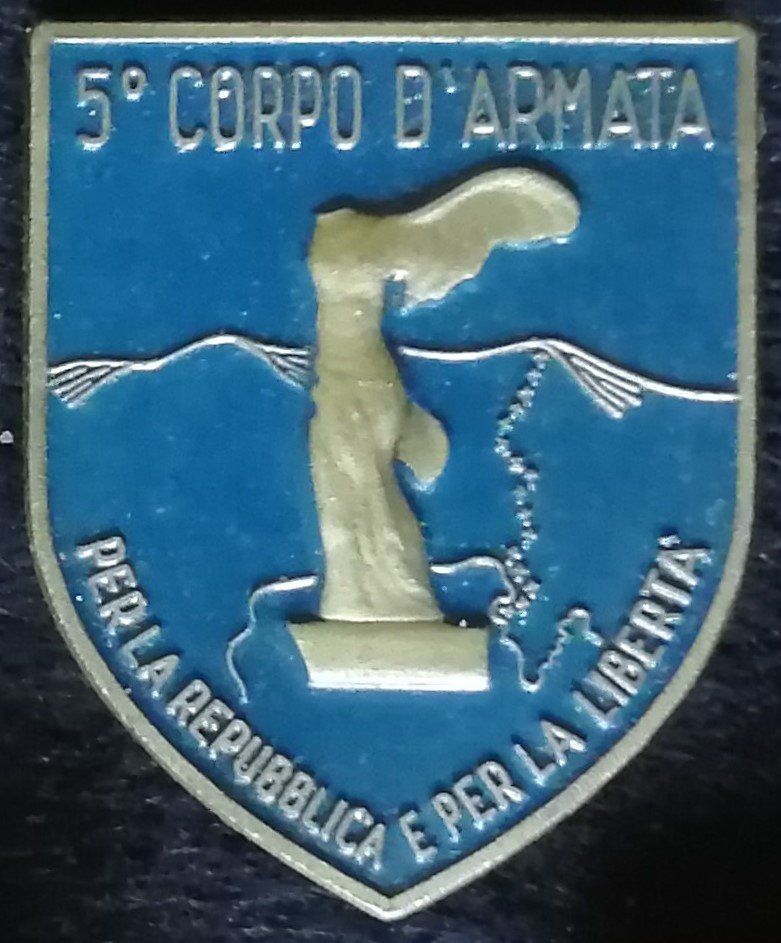
Badge of the 5th Army Corps

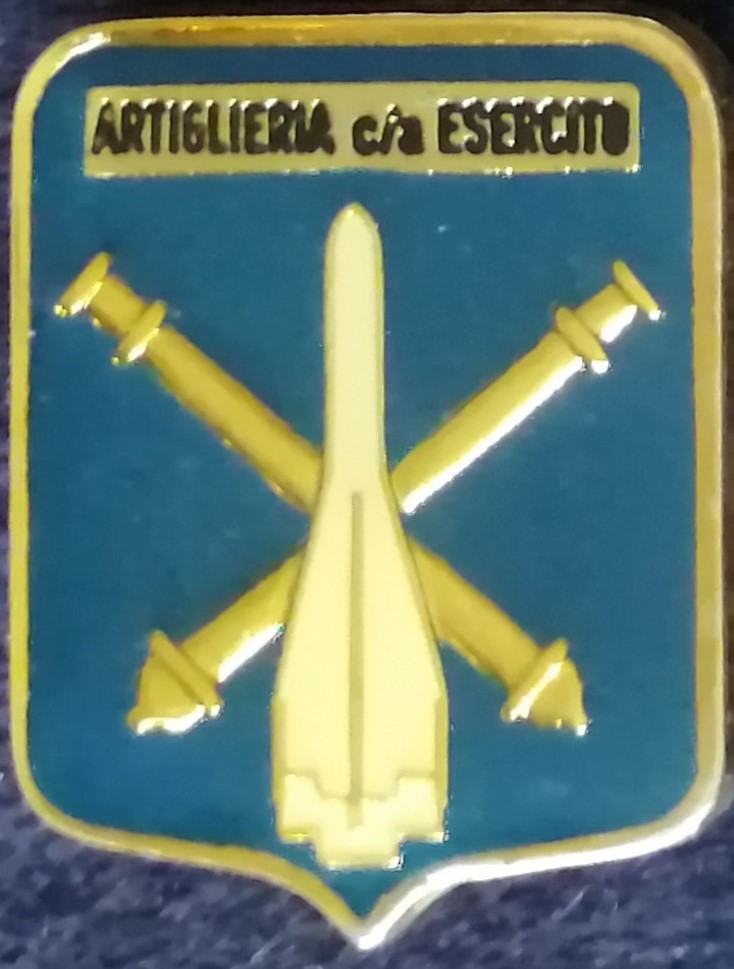
Badge of the Anti-aircraft Artillery Command

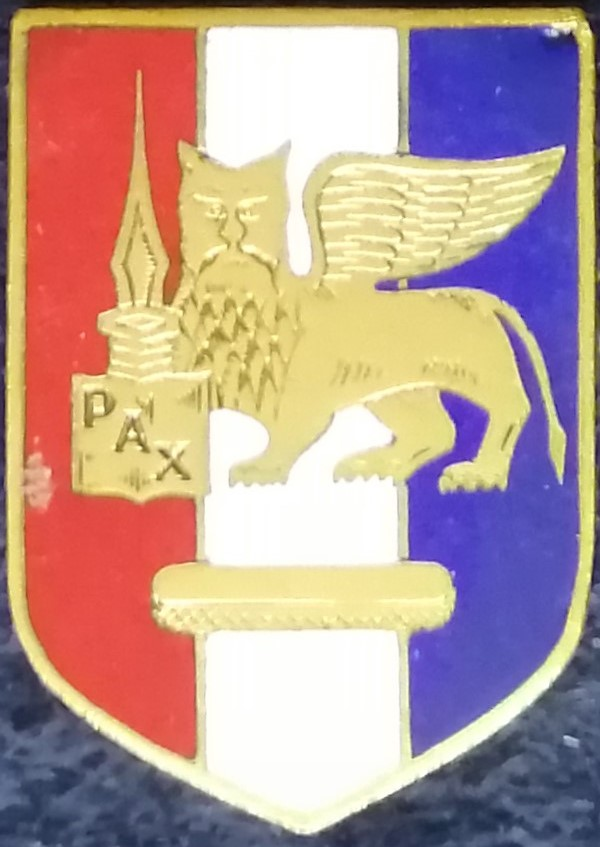
Badge of the SETAF

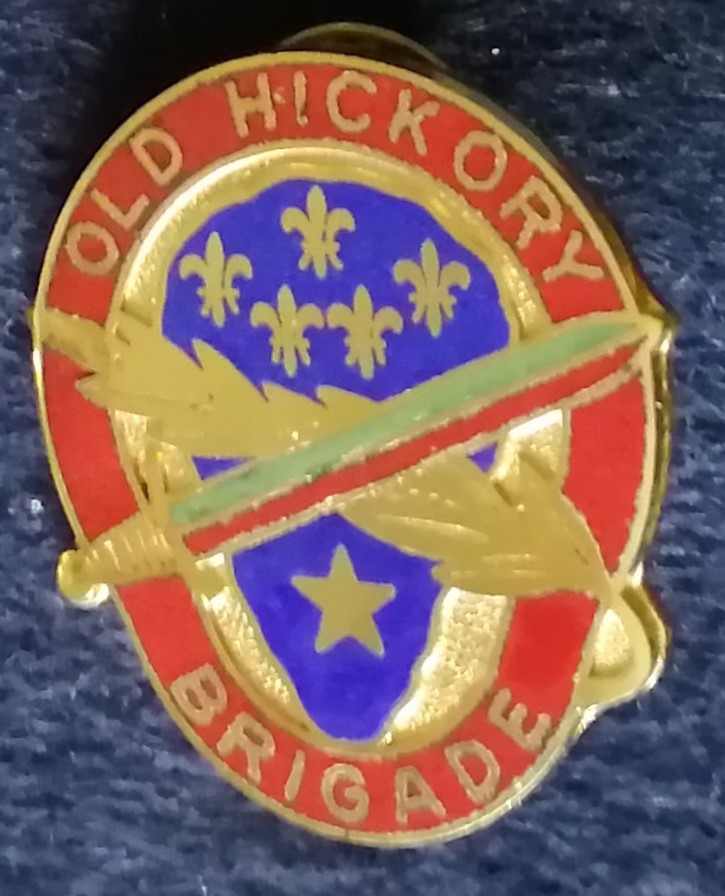
Badge of the 30th Brigade, North Carolina Army National Guard

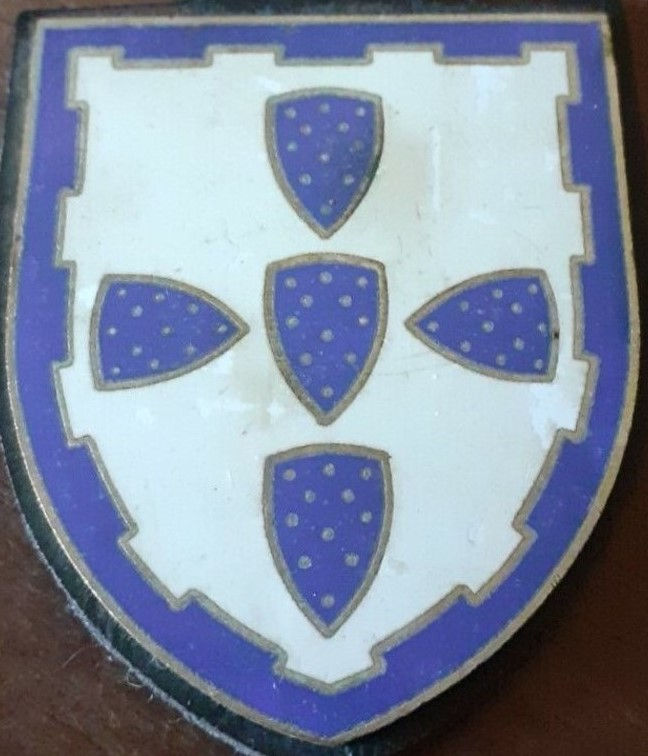
Badge of the 1ª Brigada Mista Independente (PT)

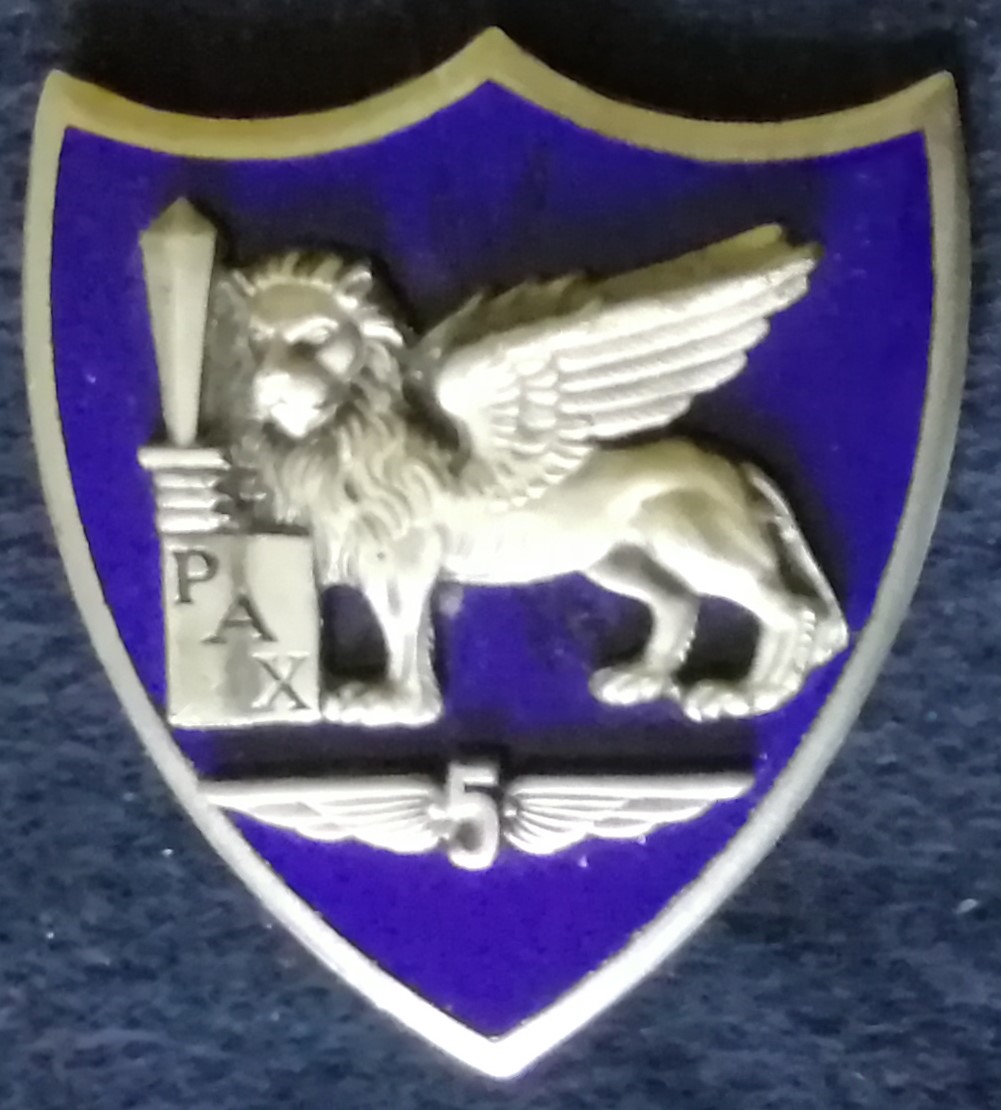
Badge of the 5th ATAF
