= Operation Winter Harvest =

1981–82 American search and rescue mission

Operation Winter Harvest was a search and rescue mission tasked to Intelligence Support Activity (ISA) in response to the kidnapping of U.S. Brigadier General James Dozier on 17 December 1981 by the Red Brigades, an Italian terrorist organization. ISA operatives worked in conjunction with Italian police to locate the kidnapped general primarily through the use of intercepted Red Brigades radio communications. The operation, which took place during December 1981 and January 1982, resulted in the successful rescue of Dozier as well as the arrest of a number of Red Brigades members.

== Development of the ISA ==
Several unsuccessful special operations missions such as Operation Eagle Claw in Iran revealed weaknesses in the United States’ ability to respond to high stakes hostage situations. Out of these failures came the creation of the Field Operations Group (FOG), the predecessor to the Intelligence Support Activity, on 25 August 1980. Colonel Jerry King was appointed as the head of the 50-man group for the purpose of executing a rescue mission in Iran code-named Operation Snowbird. However, King's team achieved a permanent status after its success during Operation Snowbird. Intelligence Support Activity (ISA), nicknamed "The Activity," was approved for creation on 29 January 1981 and officially established a little over a month later, with 50 authorized personnel. The Activity's stated mission was to provide the collection of actionable intelligence and "operational preparation for the battlespace." ISA had an initial budget of $7 million and King, now the commander of ISA, used it to grow the team to 100 members.

The early ISA members were "knob-turners" who specialized in electronic surveillance, "spooks" who specialized in human intelligence, intelligence specialists, and some administrative and logistical staff. A large part of the 25-man team that participated in Operation Winter Harvest was made up of the "knob-turners."

== Kidnapping of Dozier ==
On 17 December 1981 in Verona, two members of the Italian terrorist organization Red Brigades disguised themselves as plumbers to gain entry into the apartment of Brigadier General James Dozier, the then senior U.S. Army officer in NATO's Allied Land Forces Southern Europe. Over the prior seven years, no hostages of the Red Brigades had been found alive. 10 days after the kidnapping, the Red Brigades released a photo of Dozier with a swollen left eye sitting in front of a banner with the Italian group's emblem, denouncing the general as an "assassin and hero of the American massacres in Vietnam" and announcing the start of his "proletarian trial."

== Search for Dozier and ISA contributions ==
Initially, the Joint Special Operations Command (JSOC), which was in charge of handling terrorist incidents, sent a six-man liaison team of Delta Force and ISA members led by Colonel Jesse Johnson, a senior Delta officer, to offer "technical assistance" to the Italian authorities. Johnson reported to the JSOC headquarters that the Activity should take the job of searching for the kidnapped general.

ISA signals intelligence (SIGINT) operators primarily searched for the Red Brigades’ communications networks. As part of this mission, ISA equipped a Bell UH-1 Huey helicopter with the "latest frequency-scanning radio sets and electronic direction-finding equipment." This allowed the SIGINT operators to lock onto and track the Red Brigades’ radio communications even after they changed frequencies. In addition to the Huey, ISA ground units were in vehicles and at static locations looking for more of the group's communications links. Once the ISA operators gathered information on the Red Brigades’ frequencies, they passed it onto the NSA who used the Aquacade spy satellite to pinpoint the safe houses that the signals were coming from.

During this time, Italian police had arrested 14 members of the Red Brigades with the help of ISA, which had used intercepted Red Brigade radio communications to find the coordinates of several Red Brigade safe houses. These arrests helped the authorities gain information through interrogation and the documents confiscated. One of the arrested members, Giovanni Senzani, was the leader of one of the two factions within the terrorist group and was in possession of a letter from the leader of other faction, Antonio Savasta, which strongly suggested that Savasta was holding Dozier.

Information from both the arrests as well as ISA analysis reduced the search down to three separate areas between Padua, Verona, and Vicenza. The Red Brigades had transmitters active in each area and used speech that was easily discerned by ISA and Italian authorities as discussing Dozier. Additionally, the ISA tracked a yacht owned by Dr. Mario Frascella near Venice that was in regular contact with the Red Brigades team in the Guizza district of Padua. The Activity then studied the electricity usage of houses and apartments within the district in an effort to find irregularities, eventually finding an apartment that had a sharp and unusual increase in power usage the day of the Dozier kidnapping. The apartment, located above a supermarket, was only 48 miles from the kidnapping and being rented out by Mario Frascella, the owner of the Venice yacht, for his 21-year-old daughter, Emanuela. Further reports by neighbors mentioning the surprising amount of food and newspapers that Emanuela was buying for supposedly living alone.

On 28 January 1982, ten members of the Italian antiterrorist unit Nucleo Operativo Centrale di Sicurezza, nicknamed "Leatherheads" for the facial coverings, conducted on the Padua apartment that saw them rescue Dozier, apprehend the six Red Brigades members present, and avoid any casualties without firing a single shot.

== Aftermath ==
Operation Winter Harvest was the Activity's first major success and also was the second time a hostage of the Red Brigades had ever been safely rescued. Though ISA played a crucial role in the search and rescue mission, the American government gave the Italian authorities all of the credit in order to keep the organization's existence secret. A few months after the operation, budgets for special operations were increased in order to counter the growing terrorist threat. Furthermore, the operation's success meant that Jerry King's new organization would begin to receive more assignments.
