= Empalme =

Empalme (Spanish: "junction", "splice", "union") may refer to

Places

- Empalme, Sonora, city in northwestern Mexico
- Empalme Villa Constitución, town in the Argentine province of Santa Fe
- El Empalme, town in the Ecuadorian province of Guayas
- Empalme Escobedo, in the Mexican state of Guanajuato
- Empalme Nicolich, in Uruguay
- Empalme Olmos, in Uruguay

Other

- Empalme (food), tortilla sandwich originating in the Mexican state of Nuevo León
- Empalme (Madrid Metro), station on Line 5 of the Madrid Metro
