= George E. Marine =

United States Army general

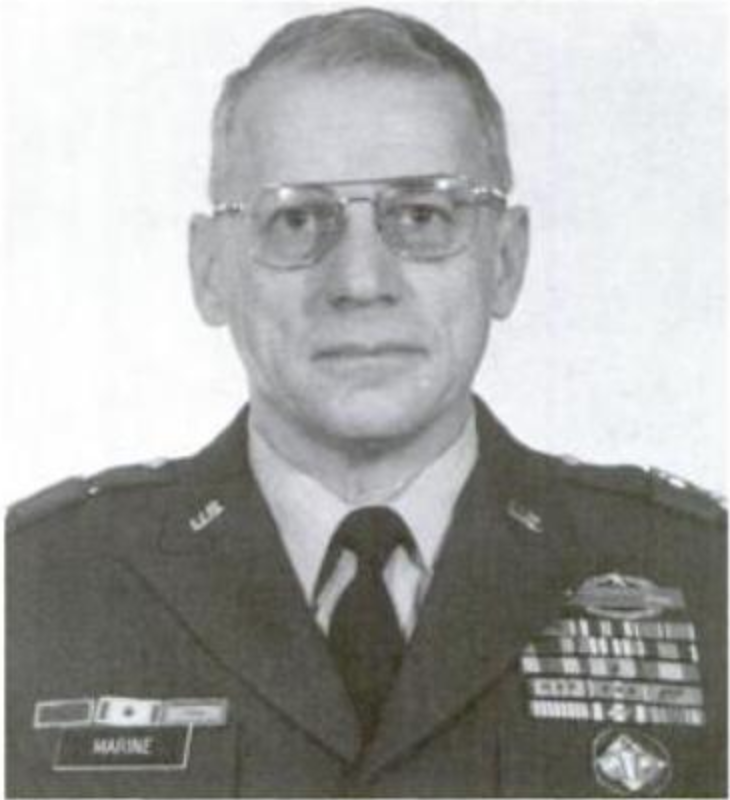
- Born: 5 January 1930; Jacksonville, Illinois U.S.
- Died: 25 August 1998 (aged 68); Illinois, U.S.
- Military career
- Allegiance: United States
- Branch: United States Army
- Service years: 1948–1980s
- Rank: Major general
- Commands: Deputy Commander, Allied Land Forces Southern Europe; United States Army Readiness and Mobilization Region II

George Edward Marine (5 January 1930 – 25 August 1998) was a major general in the United States Army. He served as deputy commander of Allied Land Forces Southern Europe.
