= Intelligence Support Activity =

United States Army Special Operations unit

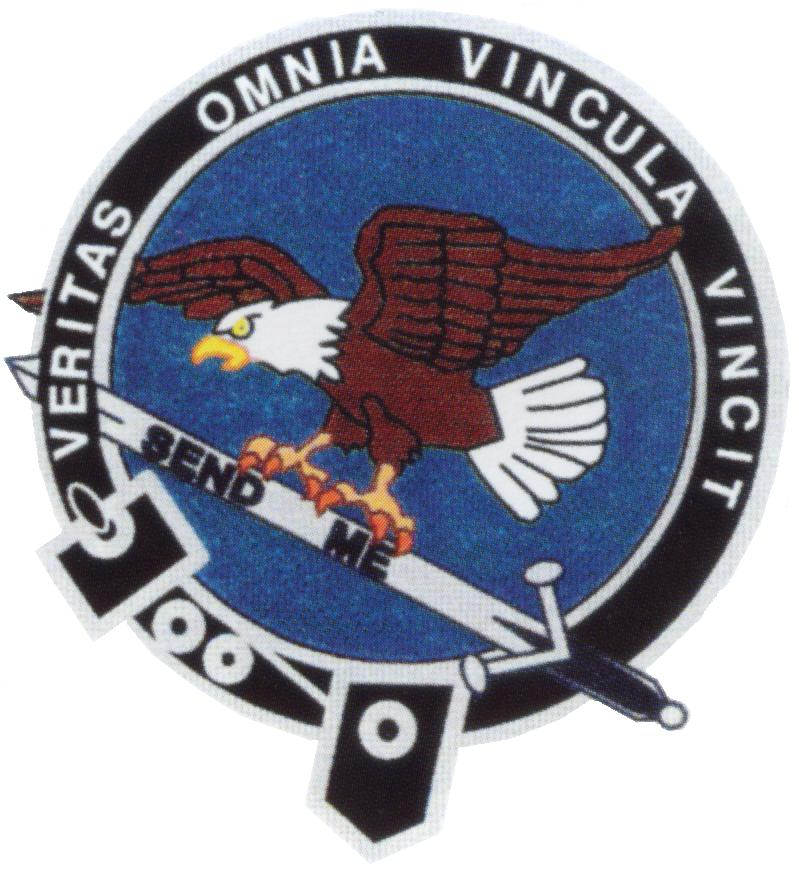
- ISA emblem
- Active: 1981–present
- Country: United States of America
- Branch: United States Army
- Type: Special operations forces Special mission unit
- Role: Clandestine HUMINT and covert action Counterterrorism; ISTAR; Long-range penetration Military intelligence SIGINT; Special reconnaissance
- Size: Classified
- Part of: United States Special Operations Command; Joint Special Operations Command; United States Army Special Operations Command
- Headquarters: Fort Belvoir, Virginia
- Nicknames: The Activity, The Army of Northern Virginia
- Motto: "Send me" or Veritas omnia vincula vincit ("Truth overcomes all bonds")
- Engagements: Operation Winter Harvest; Operation Prime Chance; Operation Desert Storm; Operation Gothic Serpent; Operation Joint Endeavor; Operation Enduring Freedom; Operation Iraqi Freedom; Operation Inherent Resolve
- Decorations: Presidential Unit Citation; Joint Meritorious Unit Award; Superior Unit Award

Commanders
- Current commander: Classified
- Notable commanders: Jerry King; Michael K. Nagata; Richard E. Angle

The Intelligence Support Activity (ISA), also known at various times as Mission Support Activity (MSA), Office of Military Support (OMS), Field Operations Group (FOG), Studies and Analysis Activity (SAA), Tactical Concept Activity, Tactical Support Team, Tactical Coordination Detachment, and also nicknamed "The Activity" and the "Army of Northern Virginia", is a United States Army special operations unit which serves as the field military intelligence gathering component of Joint Special Operations Command (JSOC). Within JSOC, the unit is often referred to as Task Force Orange.

Originally subordinated to the United States Army Intelligence and Security Command (INSCOM), it is one of the least known intelligence components of the United States military, tasked with clandestine human intelligence operations and collecting actionable intelligence during or prior to JSOC missions.

The Activity and its counterparts the Regimental Reconnaissance Company (RRC), Delta Force, DEVGRU, and the 24th Special Tactics Squadron (24th STS) are the U.S. military's special mission units, performing the most complex, classified, and dangerous missions as directed by the National Command Authority.

The unit is known by many names. USAISA was the official name of the unit from 1981 to 1989. It has also gone by a number of two-word special access program names, including OPTIMIZE TALENT, ROYAL CAPE, CENTRA SPIKE, CAPACITY GEAR, GRANTOR SHADOW, TORN VICTOR, QUIET ENABLE, OPAQUE LEAF, CEMETERY WIND, GRAY FOX, TITRANT RANGER, and INTREPID SPEAR.

== History ==
=== Field Operations Group ===
The Field Operations Group (FOG) was created in the summer of 1980 in order to take part in a second attempt to rescue the U.S. hostages held in the Tehran embassy after the failure of the Operation Eagle Claw. That operation had highlighted the U.S. shortfall in intelligence gathering.

The Field Operations Group was under command of Colonel Jerry King and operated in Iran, accomplishing various covert intelligence gathering missions. The work accomplished by the FOG was successful, however the second attempt (called Operation Credible Sport) never took place because the air assets needed were not available.

After the cancellation of Operation Credible Sport, the FOG was not disbanded but enlarged. The administration saw ground intelligence contingencies as needing improvement if future special operations were to be successful, as the Central Intelligence Agency (CIA) did not always provide all the information needed. So, on 3 March 1981, the FOG was established as a permanent unit and renamed US Army Intelligence Support Activity (USAISA). This ISA should not be confused with a later unit known as the Ground Intelligence Support Activity (GISA), which was subordinated to the Army G2.

=== Badge and insignia ===
The current badge depicts an American bald eagle grasping a claymore, surrounded by a kilt belt, inscribed with the Latin phrase "Veritas Omnia Vincula Vincit" ("Truth Overcomes All Bonds"). In the original crest, the claymore was wrapped in a chain with one of the links broken as a reminder of those killed during the failed Operation Eagle Claw. This symbol of failure was later deemed no longer appropriate.

The badge was deliberately designed by Jerry King and other founding members of the unit because of their shared Scottish heritage. The claymore is a greatsword originating from the Scottish Highlands, and the belt surrounding the badge is seen on Scottish clan badges (the belt signifies that the wearer is a member rather than the chief of the clan - the chief wears the badge without a belt surround).

=== U.S. Army Intelligence Support Activity ===
==== Build-up ====
In 1981 the Intelligence Support Activity began to immediately select new operators, growing from the FOG's original 50 members to about 100. The ISA remained extremely secret; all of its records were classified under a Special Access Program initially named OPTIMIZE TALENT. The ISA was given its classified budget of $7 million, a secret headquarters in Arlington, Virginia, and cover name, the Tactical Concept Activity. ISA included three main operations branches (Command, SIGINT and Operations) and an analysis branch, whose name changed over the years (e.g. Directorate of Intelligence, Directorate of Intelligence and Security). Colonel Jerry King became the ISA's first commander.

The ISA's mission was to support United States special operations forces (primarily Delta Force and DEVGRU) in counterterrorism and hostage rescue operations and other special operations units. The ISA would provide actionable intelligence collection, pathfinding, and operational support. The ISA performed several operations mainly in Latin America and the Middle East during the 1980s, but also in East Africa, South-East Asia, and Europe. The current organization of ISA is classified but does contain at least three squadrons (Operations, SIGINT and Mission Support/Communications).

==== First missions ====
The ISA conducted various missions, including giving protection to the Lebanese leader Bachir Gemayel and attempting to buy a Soviet T-72 tank from Iraq (a deal that was finally stopped by the Iraqis).

==== Dozier kidnapping, Operation Winter Harvest ====
On 17 December 1981, the senior U.S. Army officer in NATO Land Forces Southern European Command, Brigadier General James L. Dozier, was kidnapped from his apartment in Verona, Italy, by the Italian Red Brigades terrorist organization. The search for General Dozier saw a massive deployment of Italian and U.S. forces, including thousands of Italian national police, the Carabinieri. The search also featured some unconventional participants, including "remote viewers" from Project Stargate and an international cast of psychics, largely orchestrated by General Albert Stubblebine, then-Commander of United States Army Intelligence and Security Command (INSCOM), and a great believer in the use of unconventional intelligence gathering methods. An ISA SIGINT team was sent to Italy as part of Operation Winter Harvest and in conjunction with other Army SIGINT and counterintelligence units, employed aerial and ground-based SIGINT systems to monitor and geo-locate terrorist communications. ISA and the other Army elements provided useful intelligence, helping Italian police to arrest several Red Brigades members in mid-January 1982. The Italian police and intelligence agencies have never officially disclosed how they located General Dozier in late January 1982. However, U.S. Army participants in the operation have hinted that the mid-January arrests, the interrogation of those arrested, and follow-on investigations led to the eventual location of the Red Brigades hideout where Dozier was being held, in an apartment over a store in Padova. There is little doubt that the successful outcome resulted in part from the contributions of ISA's SIGINT specialists and the other supporting Army intelligence elements. General Dozier was freed unharmed by NOCS operators, also known as "The Leatherheads" for their unique headgear, on 28 January 1982.

==== Operation Queens Hunter ====
In early 1982, the ISA was needed to support a SIGINT mission in El Salvador, a mission that the Central Intelligence Agency (CIA), the National Security Agency (NSA), and United States Army Intelligence and Security Command (INSCOM) were not able to accomplish. The task was submitted to the United States Army Special Operations Division (SOD), which started Operation Queens Hunter. Operating from a Beechcraft model 100 King Air flown by SEASPRAY (a clandestine military aviation unit) based in Honduras, ISA SIGINT specialists monitored communications from Salvadoran guerrilla death squads, providing intelligence which helped the Salvadoran Army defend against guerrilla attacks. The success was such that the operation, planned to last a month, ran for more than three years. More aircraft were deployed, and eventually included eavesdropping on Honduran guerrillas too, as well as Nicaraguan Army units fighting against the Contras.

==== The POW/MIA affair ====
The ISA has also conducted an operation to search for US MIAs (soldiers reported as Missing In Action) allegedly held in South-East Asia in secret POWs camps in the 1980s. In 1979, U.S. intelligence thought it had located a POW camp in Laos using aerial and satellite photographs. A ground reconnaissance was needed to determine if people seen on photographs were really American POWs. At the same time, former Special Forces Lieutenant-Colonel James G. "Bo" Gritz planned a private rescue mission with other S.F. veterans. Having informed the U.S. government officials about the mission, Gritz was first told to abort his "mission," but was eventually approached by the ISA. Nonetheless, Gritz was not believed to be doing serious work, and Pentagon officials ordered the ISA to terminate their relationship with him when they discovered that ISA had provided him with money and equipment.

In 1989, the then USAISA commander John G. Lackey sent a telex "terminating" the USAISA term and his special access program GRANTOR SHADOW. Colonel John Lackey served as unit commander from 1986 to 1989. However, the unit continued under a series of different Top Secret codenames which are changed every two years. Known codenames included CAPACITY GEAR, CENTRA SPIKE, TORN VICTOR, QUIET ENABLE, CEMETERY WIND, and GRAY FOX.

==== Gray Fox ====
Gray Fox was the codename used by the ISA at the beginning of the War in Afghanistan. Its members often worked closely with Joint Special Operations Command and the Central Intelligence Agency (CIA).

In 2002, Gray Fox operators served alongside Delta Force and DEVGRU in the mountains of Afghanistan. Gray Fox intercepted enemy communications and trekked to observation posts with special operations units. They also supported the conventional forces of the 10th Mountain Division and 101st Airborne Division in fighting near Takur Ghar in Afghanistan's Shahikot Valley during Operation Anaconda.

The unit helped spearhead the search for Saddam Hussein and his family after the U.S.-led invasion of Iraq in 2003. Gray Fox operatives sometimes work under the broader umbrella of "Joint Special Operations Task Force 20", which also included DEVGRU, the Army's Delta Force, and 160th Special Operations Aviation Regiment. Saddam Hussein was eventually captured during Operation Red Dawn.

=== Under Joint Special Operations Command ===
In 2003, the Intelligence Support Activity was transferred from the Army INSCOM to Joint Special Operations Command, where it was renamed the Mission Support Activity.

Since 2005 onward, the ISA has not always operated under a two-worded Special Access Program (SAP) name (GRAY FOX, CENTRA SPIKE, etc.). In 2009, the unit was referred to as INTREPID SPEAR, until this was revealed to have been leaked in an email to the Pentagon. In 2010 it was referred to as the United States Army Studies and Analysis Activity.

Elements of the former ISA assisted in intelligence collection and analysis operations prior to and during the 2 May 2011 U.S. Special Operations Forces mission which resulted in the death of Osama bin Laden. Elements of DEVGRU, along with the ISA, members of the CIA Special Activities Division, DIA, and the NSA combined to execute a raid in Abbottabad, Pakistan, which ultimately killed bin Laden and resulted in the deaths of several family members and associates.

== Recruitment, training, and organization ==
According to Sean Naylor in Not a Good Day to Die, most (but certainly not all) Activity operatives come from United States Army Special Forces, due to their self-reliance and specialized skill-set. Candidates also come from the other military branches. Most candidates assigned to the Operations, Communications, and/or SIGINT squadrons go through an assessment and selection course, as well as a lengthy background investigation and psychological testing. Once admitted, they receive further training in a specialized Training Course. Like all units, the Intelligence Support Activity contains operational detachments as well as support detachments such as intelligence analysis, medical, logistics.

=== HUMINT and SIGINT ===
Foreign language skills, although highly desired, are not a prerequisite to becoming a member of the ISA, though to be a SIGINT/HUMINT operator in the field with other Special Mission Units, working clandestine operations in non-permissive environments, knowing a minimum of several languages is usually indispensable (e.g. Persian, Arabic, Pashto etc.).

Some of the disciplines focused on in the training course are infiltration techniques, advanced air operations, professional driving (offensive and off-road), personal defensive measures, use of state-of-the-art communications equipment, deep surveillance, tradecraft, weapons handling, hand-to-hand combat, signals intelligence, etc.

== See also ==
Other Intelligence-based special operations units:

- 13th Parachute Dragoon Regiment, a similar unit of French army special forces
- Special Reconnaissance Regiment, a similar unit in the United Kingdom Special Forces.
- Sister JSOC units:
  - 1st Special Forces Operational Detachment – Delta
  - 24th Special Tactics Squadron
  - Naval Special Warfare Development Group
  - 75th Ranger Regimental Reconnaissance Company
