= List of units and formations of the Spanish Army 1990 =

A list of units and formations of the Spanish Army in 1990 is given below.

From 1958–60 the Spanish Army reorganized along "Pentomic" five-component division lines. In 1965 a reorganization was undertaken that divided Spanish Army forces into Immediate Intervention (Field Army) and Operational Territorial Defence (Territorial Army) formations, adopting a structure of divisions broken down into brigades. However, from 1984 a modernization plan was underway aimed at improving the deployability of the army and updating its equipment. The Modernización del Ejército de Tierra (META) plan, as it was called, only achieved its objectives partially, yet the army was reorganized.

After the end of the Spanish Civil War, infantry regiments maintained a traditional and ceremonial identity, but were not an operational level of command. Operational command goes from brigades directly to infantry battalions, bypassing the regimental level. Spanish Army armoured units were designated "Armoured Infantry Battalions" and are considered part of the infantry.

== Army General Staff ==
- Army General Staff, in Madrid
  - Infantry Regiment "Inmemorial del Rey" No. 1, in Madrid

=== Military Region I Central ===
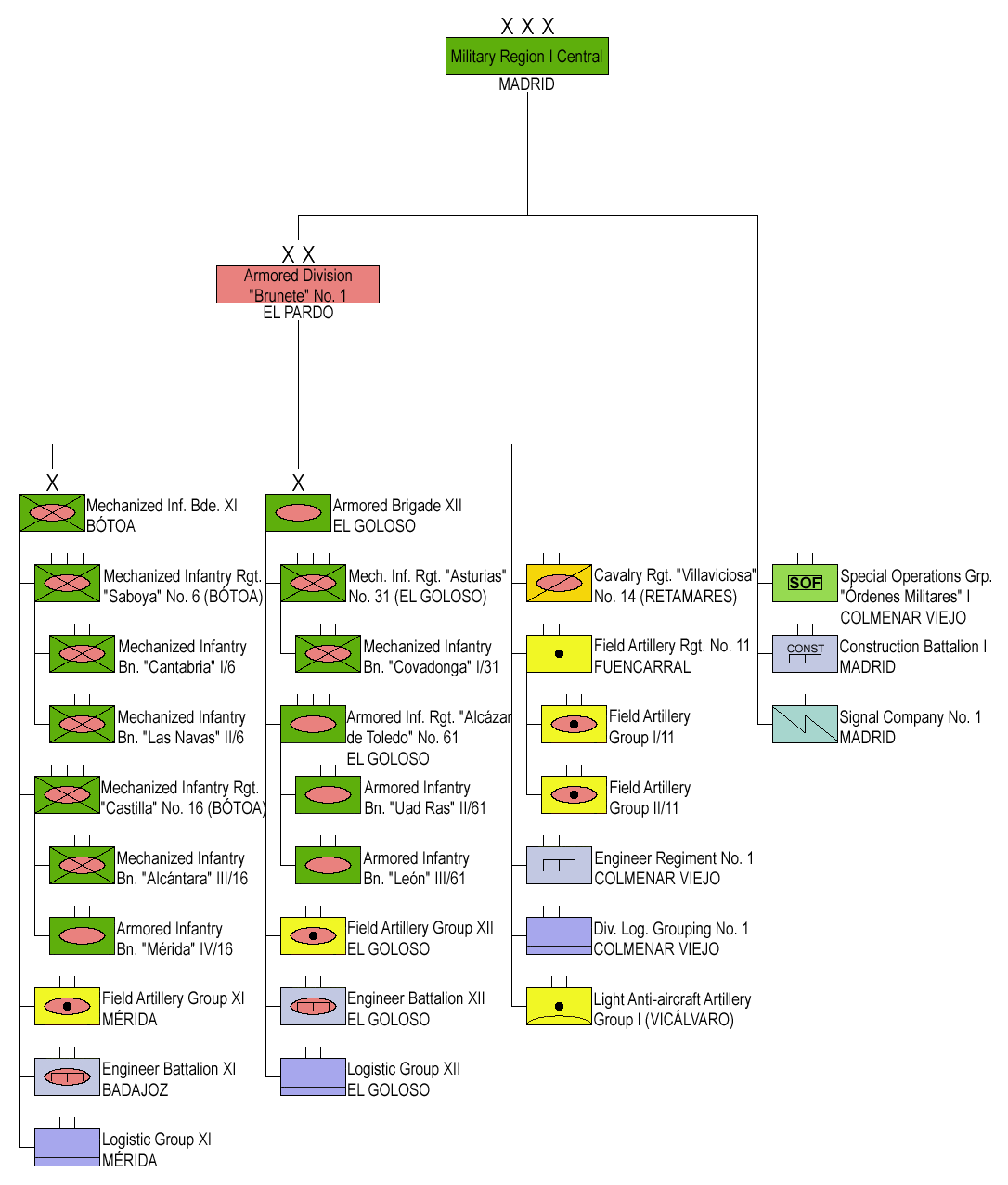
Military Region I Center organization (click to enlarge)

Coat of Arms of the Military Region I Center

The Military Region I Central (Región Militar I Centro) with its headquarters in Madrid encompassed the Community of Madrid (including the Province of Madrid) and the provinces of Ávila, Ciudad Real, Cuenca, Guadalajara, Segovia, and Toledo, all of Castilla–La Mancha as well as the provinces of Badajoz and Cáceres in Extremadura.

- Headquarters, in Madrid
  - Special Operations Group "Órdenes Militares" I, in Colmenar Viejo
  - Construction Battalion I, in Madrid
  - Signal Company No. 1, in Madrid

==== Armored Division "Brunete" No. 1 ====
- Division Headquarters, in El Pardo
  - Mechanized Infantry Brigade XI, in Bótoa
    - Mechanized Infantry Regiment "Saboya" No. 6, in Bótoa
      - Mechanized Infantry Battalion "Cantabria" I/6
      - Mechanized Infantry Battalion "Las Navas" II/6
    - Mechanized Infantry Regiment "Castilla" No. 16, in Bótoa
      - Mechanized Infantry Battalion "Alcántara" III/16
      - Armored Infantry Battalion "Mérida" IV/16
    - Field Artillery Group XI, in Mérida
    - Engineer Battalion XI, in Badajoz
    - Logistic Group XI, in Mérida
  - Armored Brigade XII, in El Goloso
    - Mechanized Infantry Regiment "Asturias" No. 31, in El Goloso
      - Mechanized Infantry Battalion "Covadonga" I/31
    - Armored Infantry Regiment "Alcázar de Toledo" No. 61, in El Goloso
      - Armored Infantry Battalion "Uad Ras" II/61
      - Armored Infantry Battalion "León" III/61
    - Field Artillery Group XII, in El Goloso
    - Engineer Battalion XII, in El Goloso
    - Logistic Group XII, in El Goloso
  - Light Armored Cavalry Regiment "Villaviciosa" No. 14, in Retamares
  - Field Artillery Regiment No. 11, in Fuencarral
    - Field Artillery Group I/11
    - Field Artillery Group II/11
  - Engineer Regiment No. 1, in Colmenar Viejo
  - Divisional Logistic Grouping No. 1, in Colmenar Viejo
  - Light Anti-aircraft Artillery Group I, in Vicálvaro

=== Military Region II South ===
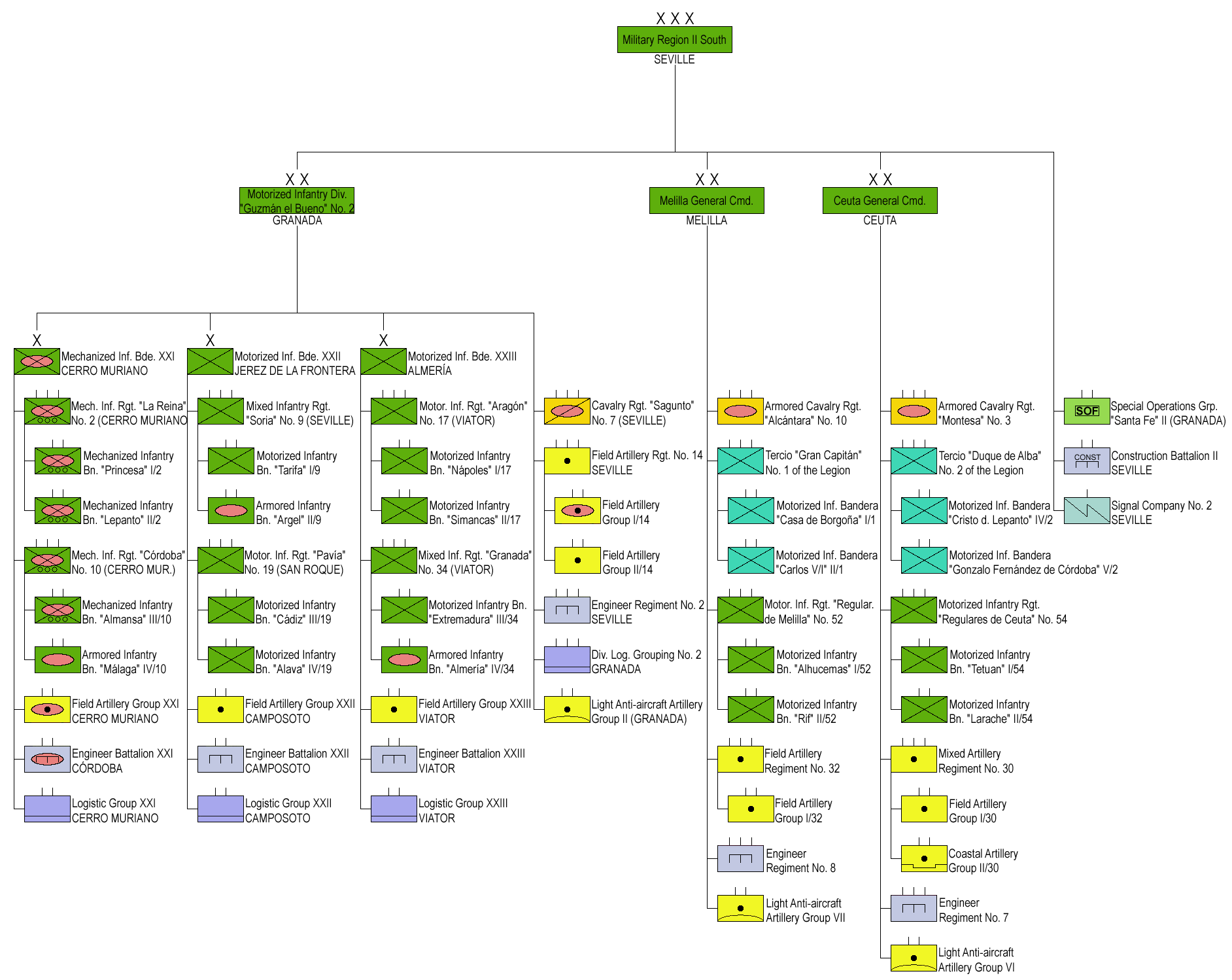
Military Region II South organization (click to enlarge)

Coat of Arms of the Military Region II South

The Military Region II South (Región Militar II Sur) with its headquarters in Seville covered Andalusia (Provinces of Almería, Cádiz, Córdoba, Granada, Huelva, Jaén, Málaga, and Seville), the exclaves of Ceuta and Melilla, and the Plazas de soberanía.

- Headquarters, in Seville
  - Special Operations Group "Santa Fe" II, in Granada
  - Construction Battalion II, in Seville
  - Signal Company No. 2, in Seville

==== Motorized Infantry Division "Guzmán el Bueno" No. 2 ====
- Division Headquarters, in Granada
  - Mechanized Infantry Brigade XXI, in Cerro Muriano
    - Mechanized Infantry Regiment "La Reina" No. 2, in Cerro Muriano
      - Mechanized Infantry Battalion "Princesa" I/2
      - Mechanized Infantry Battalion "Lepanto" II/2
    - Mechanized Infantry Regiment "Córdoba" No. 10, in Cerro Muriano
      - Mechanized Infantry Battalion "Almansa" III/10
      - Armored Infantry Battalion "Málaga" IV/10
    - Field Artillery Group XXI, in Cerro Muriano
    - Engineer Battalion XXI, in Córdoba
    - Logistic Group XXI, in Cerro Muriano
  - Motorized Infantry Brigade XXII, in Jerez de la Frontera
    - Mixed Infantry Regiment "Soria" No. 9, in Seville
      - Motorized Infantry Battalion "Tarifa" I/9
      - Armored Infantry Battalion "Argel" II/9
    - Motorized Infantry Regiment "Pavía" No. 19, in San Roque
      - Motorized Infantry Battalion "Cádiz" III/19
      - Motorized Infantry Battalion "Álava" IV/19
    - Field Artillery Group XXII, in Camposoto
    - Engineer Battalion XXII, in Camposoto
    - Logistic Group XXII, in Camposoto
  - Motorized Infantry Brigade XXIII, in Almería
    - Motorized Infantry Regiment "Aragón" No. 17, in Viator
      - Motorized Infantry Battalion "Nápoles" I/17
      - Motorized Infantry Battalion "Simancas" II/17
    - Mixed Infantry Regiment "Granada" No. 34, in Viator
      - Motorized Infantry Battalion "Extremadura" III/34
      - Armored Infantry Battalion "Almería" IV/34
    - Field Artillery Group XXIII, in Viator
    - Engineer Battalion XXIII, in Viator
    - Logistic Group XXIII, in Viator
  - Light Armored Cavalry Regiment "Sagunto" No. 7, in Seville
  - Field Artillery Regiment No. 14, in Seville
    - Field Artillery Group I/14
    - Field Artillery Group II/14
  - Engineer Regiment No. 2, in Seville
  - Divisional Logistic Grouping No. 2, in Granada
  - Light Anti-aircraft Artillery Group II, in Granada

==== Melilla General Command ====
The Melilla General Command was headed by a two-star general and tasked with the defense of the Spanish exclave of Melilla in Africa.

- Command Headquarters, in Melilla
  - Armored Cavalry Regiment "Alcántara" No. 10, in Melilla
  - Tercio "Gran Capitán" No. 1 of the Legion, in Melilla
    - Motorized Infantry Bandera "Casa de Borgoña" I/1
    - Motorized Infantry Bandera "Carlos V/I" II/1
  - Motorized Infantry Regiment "Regulares de Melilla" No. 52, in Melilla
    - Motorized Infantry Battalion "Alhucemas" I/52
    - Motorized Infantry Battalion "Rif" II/52
  - Field Artillery Regiment No. 32, in Melilla
    - Field Artillery Group I/32
  - Engineer Regiment No. 8, in Melilla
  - Light Anti-aircraft Artillery Group VII, in Melilla

==== Ceuta General Command ====
The Ceuta General Command was headed by a two-star general and tasked with the defense of the Spanish exclave of Ceuta in Africa.

- Command Headquarters, in Ceuta
  - Armored Cavalry Regiment "Montesa" No. 3, in Ceuta
  - Tercio "Duque de Alba" No. 2 of the Legion, in Ceuta
    - Motorized Infantry Bandera "Cristo de Lepanto" IV/2
    - Motorized Infantry Bandera "Gonzalo Fernández de Córdoba" V/2
  - Motorized Infantry Regiment "Regulares de Ceuta" No. 54, in Ceuta
    - Motorized Infantry Battalion "Tetuan" I/54
    - Motorized Infantry Battalion "Larache" II/54
  - Mixed Artillery Regiment No. 30, in Ceuta
    - Field Artillery Group I/30
    - Coastal Artillery Group II/30
  - Engineer Regiment No. 7, in Ceuta
  - Light Anti-aircraft Artillery Group VI, in Ceuta

=== Military Region III Levant ===
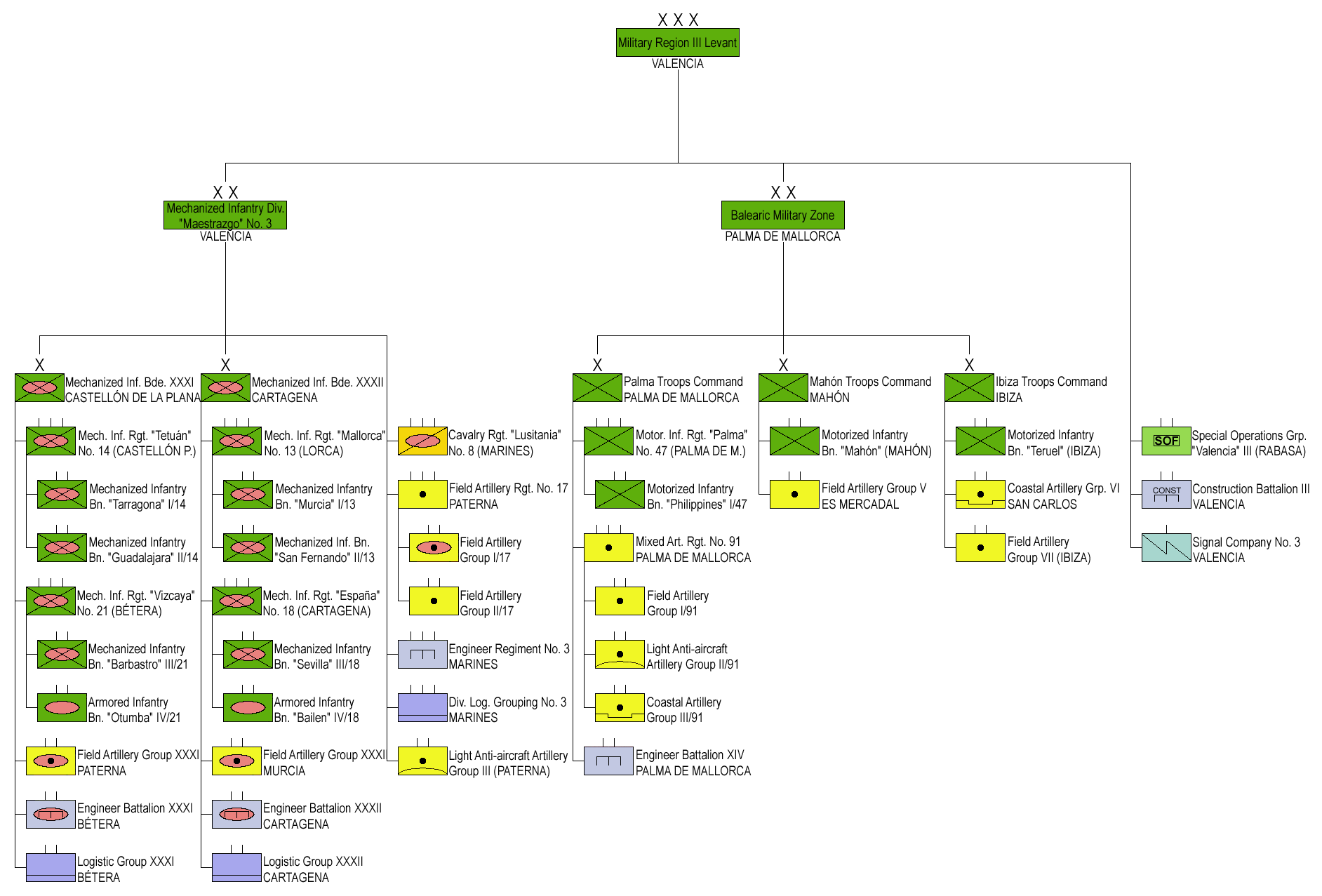
Military Region III Levant organization (click to enlarge)

The Military Region III Levant with its headquarters in Valencia encompassed the province of Albacete of Castilla-La Mancha, and the Valencian Community (composed of the provinces of Alicante, Castellón, and Valencia), as well as the Region of Murcia and the Balearic Islands.

- Headquarters, in Valencia
  - Special Operations Group "Valencia" III, in Rabasa
  - Construction Battalion III, in Valencia
  - Signal Company No. 3, in Valencia

==== Mechanized Infantry Division "Maestrazgo" No. 3 ====
- Division Headquarters, in Valencia
  - Mechanized Infantry Brigade XXXI, in Castellón de la Plana
    - Mechanized Infantry Regiment "Tetuán" No. 14, in Castellón de la Plana
      - Mechanized Infantry Battalion "Tarragona" I/14
      - Mechanized Infantry Battalion "Guadalajara" II/14
    - Mechanized Infantry Regiment "Vizcaya" No. 21, in Bétera
      - Mechanized Infantry Battalion "Barbastro" III/21
      - Armored Infantry Battalion "Otumba" IV/21
    - Field Artillery Group XXXI, in Paterna
    - Engineer Battalion XXXI, in Bétera
    - Logistic Group XXXI, in Bétera
  - Mechanized Infantry Brigade XXXII, in Cartagena
    - Mechanized Infantry Regiment "Mallorca" No. 13, in Lorca
      - Mechanized Infantry Battalion "Murcia" I/13
      - Mechanized Infantry Battalion "San Fernando" II/13
    - Mechanized Infantry Regiment "España" No. 18, in Cartagena
      - Mechanized Infantry Battalion "Sevilla" III/18
      - Armored Infantry Battalion "Bailén" IV/18
    - Field Artillery Group XXXII, in Murcia
    - Engineer Battalion XXXII, in Cartagena
    - Logistic Group XXXII, in Cartagena
  - Light Armored Cavalry Regiment "Lusitania" No. 8, in Marines
  - Field Artillery Regiment No. 17, in Paterna
    - Field Artillery Group I/17
    - Field Artillery Group II/17
  - Engineer Regiment No. 3, in Marines
  - Divisional Logistic Grouping No. 3, in Marines
  - Light Anti-aircraft Artillery Group III, in Paterna

==== Balearic Military Zone ====
The Balearic Military Zone was headed by a two-star general and encompassed the Balearic Islands. Its three troop commands were headed by one-star generals.

- Headquarters, in Palma de Mallorca
  - Palma Troops Command, in Palma de Mallorca
    - Motorized Infantry Regiment "Palma" No. 47, in Palma de Mallorca
      - Motorized Infantry Battalion "Filipinas" I/47
    - Mixed Artillery Regiment No. 91, in Palma de Mallorca
      - Field Artillery Group I/91
      - Light Anti-aircraft Artillery Group II/91
      - Coastal Artillery Group III/91
    - Engineer Battalion XIV, in Palma de Mallorca
  - Mahón Troops Command, in Mahón
    - Motorized Infantry Battalion "Mahón", in Mahón
    - Field Artillery Group V, in Es Mercadal
  - Ibiza Troops Command, in Ibiza
    - Motorized Infantry Battalion "Teruel", in Ibiza
    - Coastal Artillery Group VI, in San Carlos
    - Field Artillery Group VII, in Ibiza

=== Military Region IV Eastern Pyrenees ===
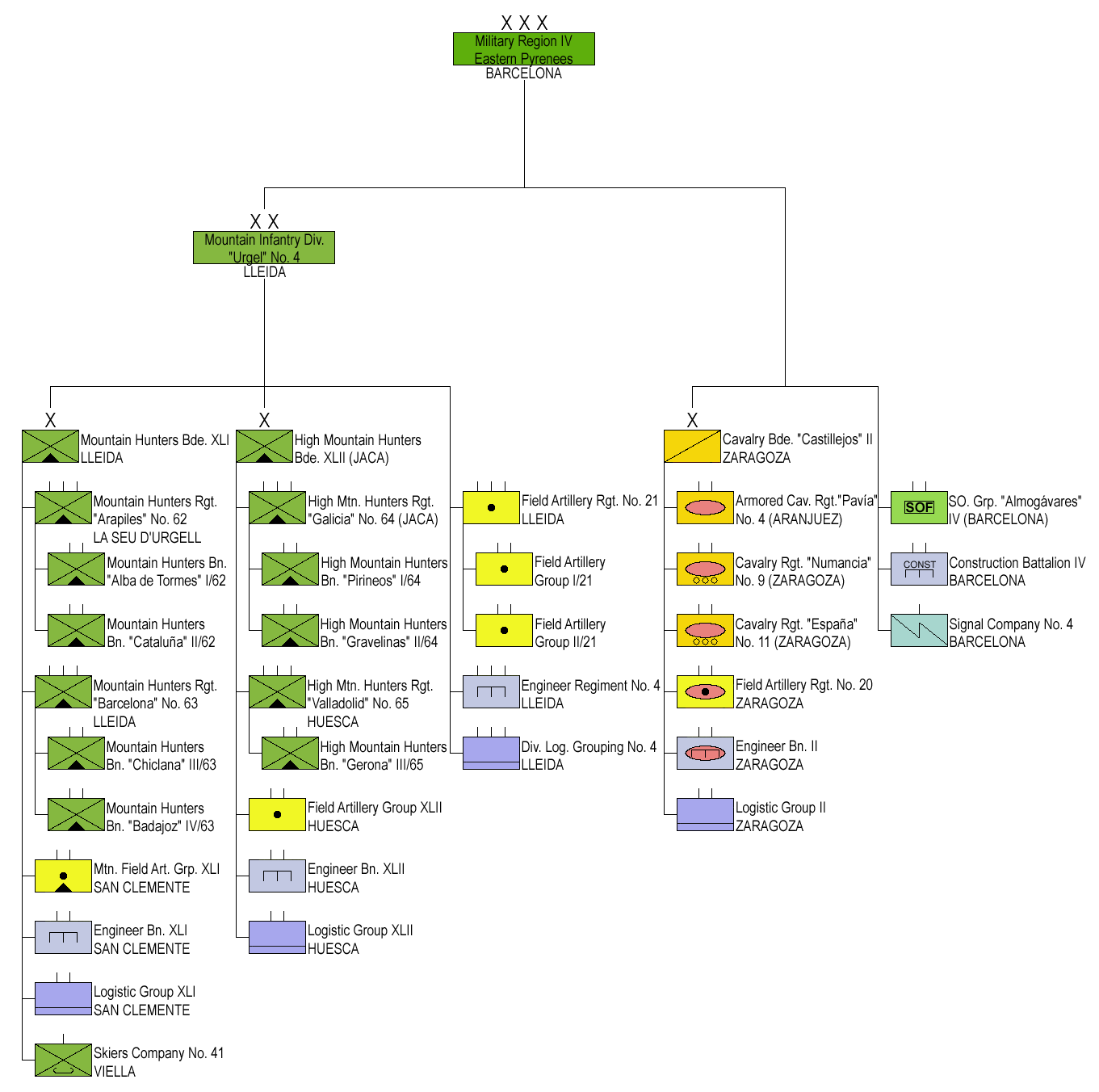
Military Region IV Eastern Pyrenees organization (click to enlarge)

Coat of Arms of the Military Region IV Eastern Pyrenees

The Military Region IV Eastern Pyrenees (Región Militar IV Pirenaica Oriental) with its headquarters in Barcelona covered Aragon (Provinces of Huesca, Teruel, and Zaragoza) and Catalonia (Provinces of Barcelona, Girona, Lleida, and Tarragona).

- Headquarters, in Barcelona
  - Special Operations Group "Almogávares" IV, in Barcelona
  - Construction Battalion IV, in Barcelona
  - Signal Company No. 4, in Barcelona

==== Mountain Infantry Division "Urgel" No. 4 ====
- Division Headquarters, in Lleida
  - Mountain Hunters Brigade XLI, in Lleida
    - Mountain Hunters Regiment "Arapiles" No. 62, in La Seu d'Urgell
      - Mountain Hunters Battalion "Alba de Tormes" I/62
      - Mountain Hunters Battalion "Cataluña" II/62
    - Mountain Hunters Regiment "Barcelona" No. 63, in Lleida
      - Mountain Hunters Battalion "Chiclana" III/63
      - Mountain Hunters Battalion "Badajoz" IV/63
    - Mountain Field Artillery Group XLI, in San Clemente
    - Engineer Battalion XLI, in San Clemente
    - Logistic Group XLI, in San Clemente
    - Skiers Company No. 41, in Vielha
  - High Mountain Hunters Brigade XLII, in Jaca
    - High Mountain Hunters Regiment "Galicia" No. 64, in Jaca
      - High Mountain Hunters Battalion "Pirineos" I/64
      - High Mountain Hunters Battalion "Gravelinas" II/64
    - High Mountain Hunters Regiment "Valladolid" No. 65, in Huesca
      - High Mountain Hunters Battalion "Gerona" III/65
    - Field Artillery Group XLII, in Huesca
    - Engineer Battalion XLII, in Huesca
    - Logistic Group XLII, in Huesca
  - Field Artillery Regiment No. 21, in Lleida
    - Field Artillery Group I/21
    - Field Artillery Group II/21
  - Engineer Regiment No. 4, in Lleida
  - Divisional Logistic Grouping No. 4, in Lleida

==== Cavalry Brigade "Castillejos" II ====
- Brigade Headquarters, in Zaragoza
  - Armored Cavalry Regiment "Pavía" No. 4, in Aranjuez
  - Light Armored Cavalry Regiment "Numancia" No. 9, in Zaragoza
  - Light Armored Cavalry Regiment "España" No. 11, in Zaragoza
  - Field Artillery Regiment No. 20, in Zaragoza
  - Engineer Battalion II, in Zaragoza
  - Logistic Group II, in Zaragoza

=== Military Region V Western Pyrenees ===
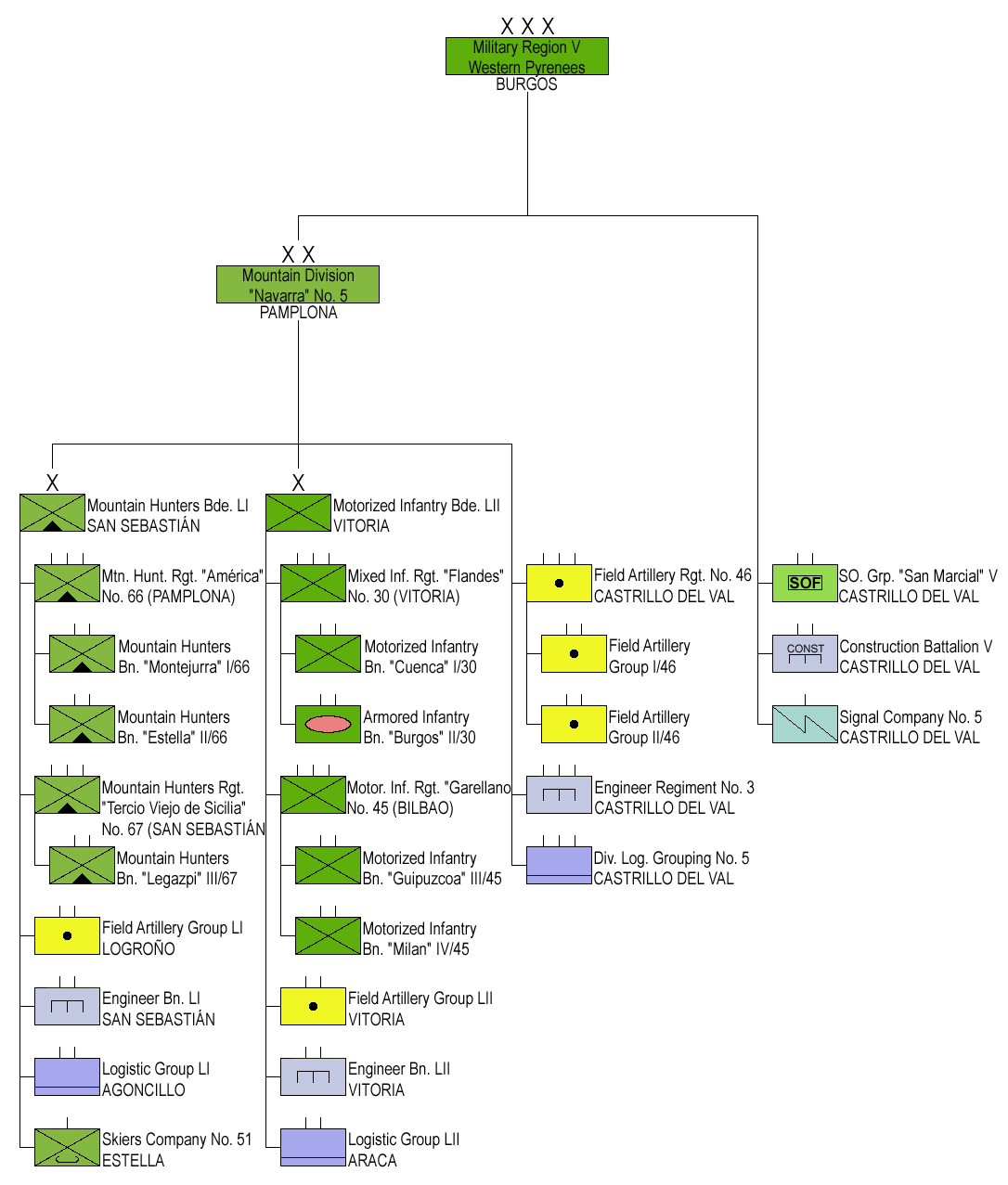
Military Region V Western Pyrenees organization (click to enlarge)

Coat of Arms of the Military Region V Western Pyrenees

The Military Region V Western Pyrenees (Región Militar V Pirenaica Occidental) with its headquarters in Burgos encompassed the provinces of the Basque Country (Álava, Biscay, Burgos and Gipuzkoa), the province of Soria in Castile and León and the regions of Cantabria, La Rioja and Navarre .

- Headquarters, in Burgos
  - Special Operations Group "San Marcial" V, in Castrillo del Val
  - Construction Battalion V, in Castrillo del Val
  - Signal Company No. 5, in Castrillo del Val

==== Mountain Division "Navarra" No. 5 ====
- Division Headquarters, in Pamplona
  - Mountain Hunters Brigade LI, in San Sebastián
    - Mountain Hunters Regiment "América" No. 66, in Pamplona
      - Mountain Hunters Battalion "Montejurra" I/66
      - Mountain Hunters Battalion "Estella" II/66
    - Mountain Hunters Regiment "Tercio Viejo de Sicilia" No. 67, in San Sebastián
      - Mountain Hunters Battalion "Legazpi" III/67
    - Field Artillery Group LI, in Logroño
    - Engineer Battalion LI, in San Sebastián
    - Logistic Group LI, in Agoncillo
    - Skiers Company No. 51, in Estella
  - Motorized Infantry Brigade LII, in Vitoria
    - Mixed Infantry Regiment "Flandes" No. 30, in Vitoria
      - Motorized Infantry Battalion "Cuenca" I/30
      - Armored Infantry Battalion "Burgos" II/30
    - Motorized Infantry Regiment "Garellano" No. 45, in Bilbao
      - Motorized Infantry Battalion "Guipúzcoa" III/45
      - Motorized Infantry Battalion "Milan" IV/45
    - Field Artillery Group LII, in Vitoria
    - Engineer Battalion LII, in Vitoria
    - Logistic Group LII, in Araca
  - Field Artillery Regiment No. 46, in Castrillo del Val
    - Field Artillery Group I/46
    - Field Artillery Group II/46
  - Engineer Regiment No. 5, in Castrillo del Val
  - Divisional Logistic Grouping No. 5, in Castrillo del Val

=== Military Region VI Northwest ===
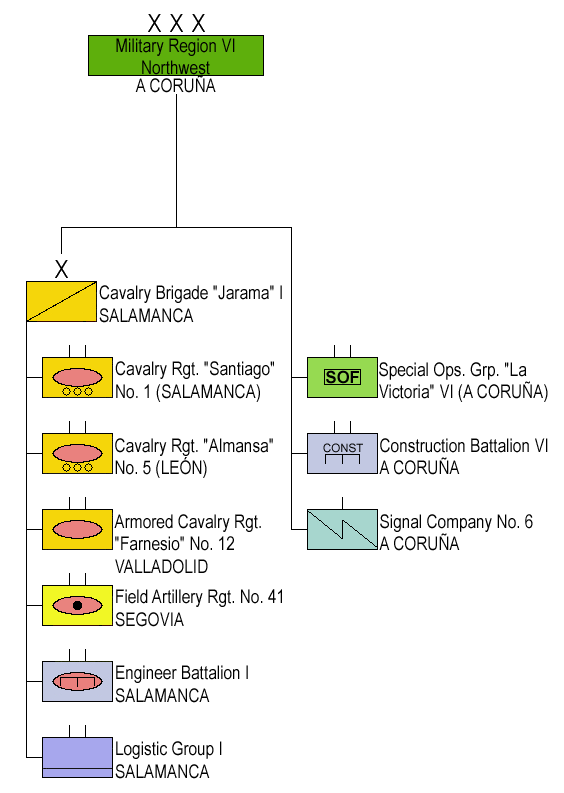
Military Region VI Northwest organization (click to enlarge)

Coat of Arms of the Military Region VI Northwest

The Military Region VI Northwest (Región Militar VI Noroeste) with its headquarters in A Coruña covered Asturias, Galicia (Provinces of A Coruña, Lugo, Ourense, and Pontevedra), and the provinces of León, Palencia, Salamanca, Valladolid, and Zamora in Castile and León.

- Headquarters, in A Coruña
  - Special Operations Group "La Victoria" VI, in A Coruña
  - Construction Battalion VI, in A Coruña
  - Signal Company No. 6, in A Coruña

==== Cavalry Brigade "Jarama" I ====
- Brigade Headquarters, in Salamanca
  - Light Armored Cavalry Regiment "Santiago" No. 1, in Salamanca
  - Light Armored Cavalry Regiment "Almansa" No. 5, in León
  - Armored Cavalry Regiment "Farnesio" No. 12, in Valladolid
  - Field Artillery Regiment No. 41, in Segovia
  - Engineer Battalion I, in Salamanca
  - Logistic Group I, in Salamanca

=== Canary Military Zone ===
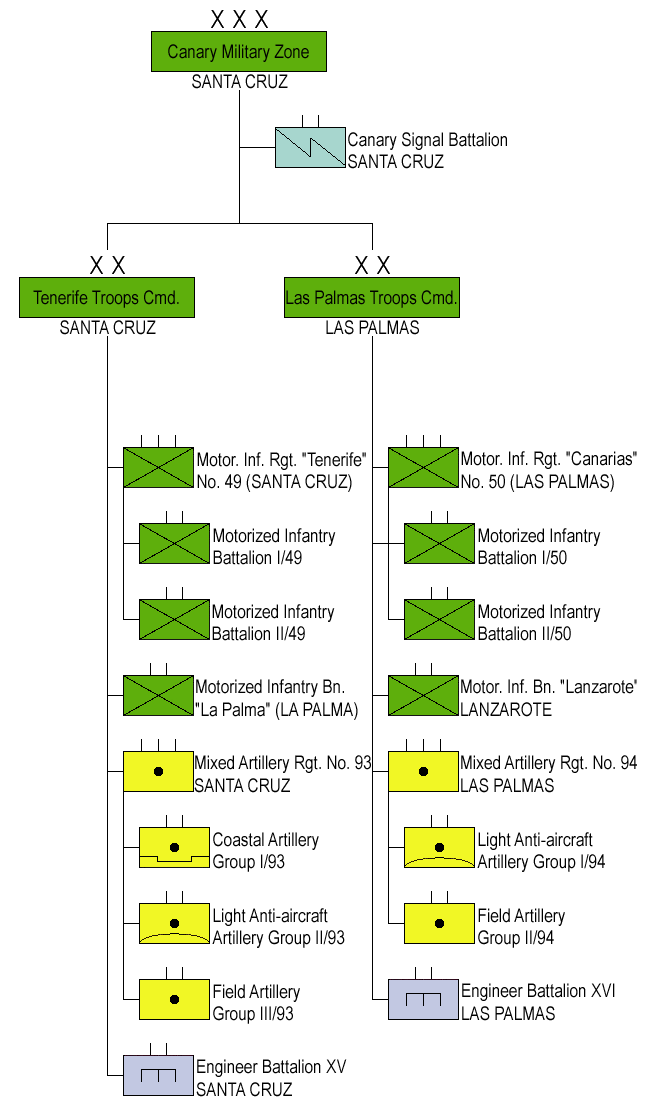
Canary Military Zone organization (click to enlarge)

The Canary Military Zone with its headquarters in Santa Cruz de Tenerife covered the Canary Islands (Provinces of Santa Cruz de Tenerife and Las Palmas). The Military Zone was headed by a three-star general and its two troop commands were headed by two-star generals.

- Headquarters, in Santa Cruz de Tenerife
  - Canary Signal Battalion, in Santa Cruz
  - Tenerife Troops Command, in Santa Cruz
    - Motorized Infantry Regiment "Tenerife" No. 49, in Santa Cruz
      - Motorized Infantry Battalion I/49
      - Motorized Infantry Battalion II/49
    - Motorized Infantry Battalion "La Palma", on La Palma
    - Mixed Artillery Regiment No. 93, in Santa Cruz
      - Coastal Artillery Group I/93
      - Light Anti-aircraft Artillery Group II/93
      - Field Artillery Group III/93
    - Engineer Battalion XV, in Santa Cruz
  - Las Palmas Troops Command, in Las Palmas^{Note 1}
    - Motorized Infantry Regiment "Canarias" No. 50, in Las Palmas
      - Motorized Infantry Battalion I/50
      - Motorized Infantry Battalion II/50
    - Motorized Infantry Battalion "Lanzarote", on Lanzarote
    - Mixed Artillery Regiment No. 94, in Las Palmas
      - Light Anti-aircraft Artillery Group I/94
      - Field Artillery Group II/94
    - Engineer Battalion XVI, in Las Palmas

Note 1: The Tercio "Juan de Austria" No. 3 of the Legion was based on Fuerteventura and changed command from the Las Palmas Troops Command to the Legion Command in 1988.

=== General Reserve ===
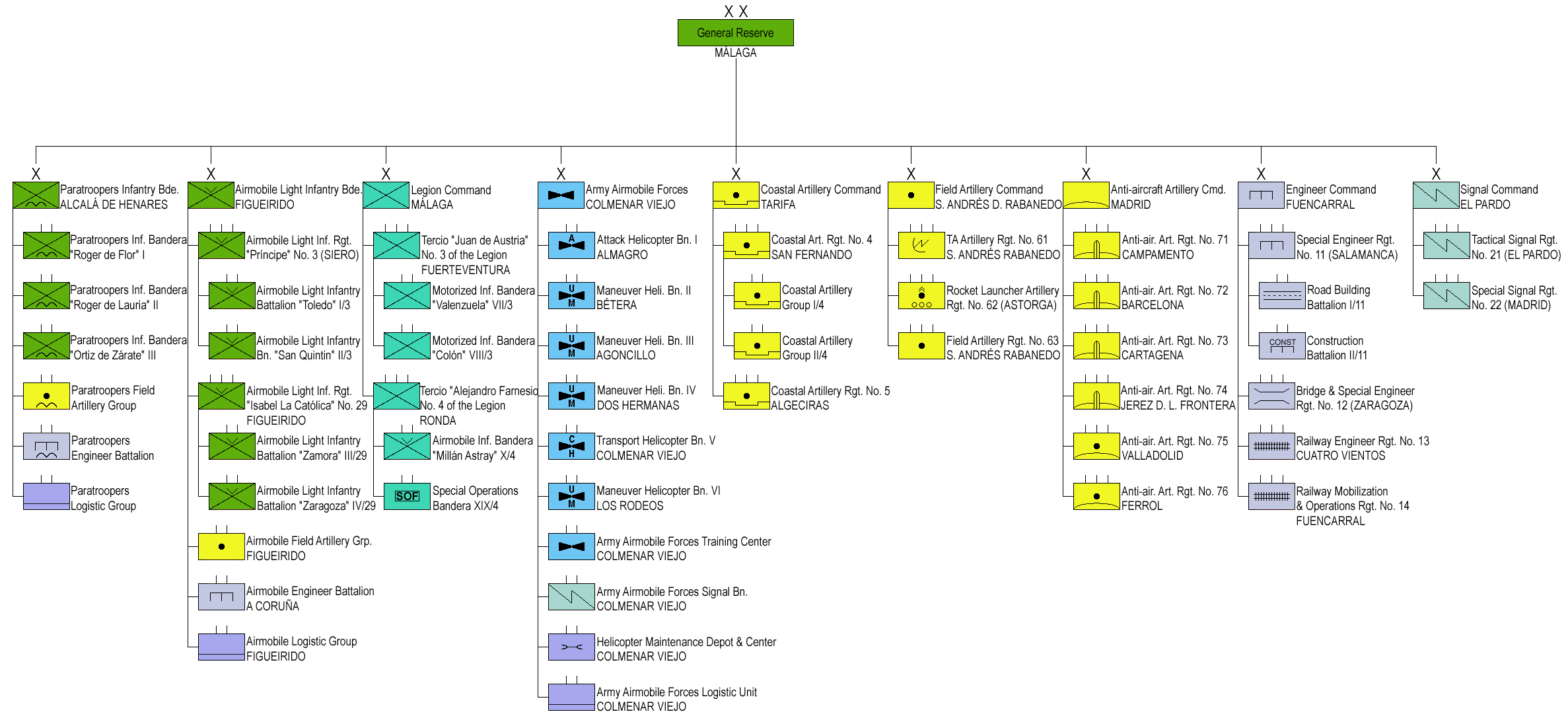
General Reserve organization (click to enlarge)

The General Reserve based in Málaga was headed by a two-star general and consisted of the Paratroopers Infantry Brigade, Airmobile Light Infantry Brigade, Legion Command, Army Airmobile Forces and five commands; all headed by a 1-star general.

- Headquarters, in Málaga

==== Paratroopers Infantry Brigade ====
- Brigade Headquarters, in Alcalá de Henares
  - Paratroopers Infantry Bandera "Roger de Flor" I, in Alcalá de Henares
  - Paratroopers Infantry Bandera "Roger de Lauria" II, in Alcalá de Henares
  - Paratroopers Infantry Bandera "Ortiz de Zárate" III, in Alcalá de Henares
  - Paratroopers Field Artillery Group, in Alcalá de Henares
  - Paratroopers Engineer Battalion, in Alcalá de Henares
  - Paratroopers Logistic Group, in Alcalá de Henares

==== Airmobile Light Infantry Brigade ====
- Brigade Headquarters, in Figueirido
  - Airmobile Light Infantry Regiment "Príncipe" No. 3, in Siero
    - Airmobile Light Infantry Battalion "Toledo" I/3
    - Airmobile Light Infantry Battalion "San Quintin" II/3
  - Airmobile Light Infantry Regiment "Isabel La Católica" No. 29, in Figueirido
    - Airmobile Light Infantry Battalion "Zamora" III/29
    - Airmobile Light Infantry Battalion "Zaragoza" IV/29
  - Airmobile Field Artillery Group, in Figueirido
  - Airmobile Engineer Battalion, in A Coruña
  - Airmobile Logistic Group, in Figueirido

==== Legion Command ====
The Legion Command was created during the META reform to oversee recruiting and training of the units of the Spanish Legion. For historic reasons the regiments of the Legion are called "Tercios" and the battalions "Banderas".

- Command Headquarters, in Málaga
  - Tercio "Juan de Austria" No. 3 of the Legion, on Fuerteventura
    - Motorized Infantry Bandera "Valenzuela" VII/3
    - Motorized Infantry Bandera "Colón" VIII/3
  - Tercio "Alejandro Farnesio" No. 4 of the Legion, in Ronda
    - Airmobile Infantry Bandera "Millán Astray" X/4
    - Special Operations Bandera XIX/4

==== Army Airmobile Forces ====
- Headquarters, in Colmenar Viejo
  - Attack Helicopter Battalion I, in Almagro
  - Maneuver Helicopter Battalion II, in Bétera
  - Maneuver Helicopter Battalion III, in Agoncillo
  - Maneuver Helicopter Battalion IV, in Dos Hermanas
  - Transport Helicopter Battalion V, in Colmenar Viejo
  - Maneuver Helicopter Battalion VI, in Los Rodeos
  - Army Airmobile Forces Signal Battalion, in Colmenar Viejo
  - Army Airmobile Forces Training Center, in Colmenar Viejo
  - Army Airmobile Forces Logistic Unit, in Colmenar Viejo
  - Helicopter Maintenance Depot and Center, in Colmenar Viejo

==== Coastal Artillery Command ====
- Command Headquarters, in Tarifa
  - Coastal Artillery Regiment No. 4, in San Fernando
    - Coastal Artillery Group I/4
    - Coastal Artillery Group II/4
  - Coastal Artillery Regiment No. 5, in Algeciras

==== Field Artillery Command ====
- Command Headquarters, in San Andrés del Rabanedo
  - Target Acquisition Artillery Regiment No. 61, in San Andrés del Rabanedo
  - Rocket Launcher Artillery Regiment No. 62, in Astorga
  - Field Artillery Regiment No. 63, in San Andrés del Rabanedo

==== Anti-aircraft Artillery Command ====
- Command Headquarters, in Madrid
  - Anti-aircraft Artillery Regiment No. 71, in Campamento
    - Light Anti-aircraft Artillery Group I/71
    - Anti-aircraft Missile Group II/71 (Roland II)
  - Anti-aircraft Artillery Regiment No. 72, in Barcelona
    - Anti-aircraft Missile Group I/72 (Hawk)
    - Light Anti-aircraft Artillery Group II/72
  - Anti-aircraft Artillery Regiment No. 73, in Cartagena
    - Anti-aircraft Missile Group I/73 (Aspide)
    - Light Anti-aircraft Artillery Group II/73
  - Anti-aircraft Artillery Regiment No. 74, in Jerez de la Frontera
    - Anti-aircraft Missile Group I/74 (Hawk)
    - Anti-aircraft Artillery Group II/74
  - Anti-aircraft Artillery Regiment No. 75, in Valladolid
    - Light Anti-aircraft Artillery Group I/75
    - Light Anti-aircraft Artillery Group II/75
  - Anti-aircraft Artillery Regiment No. 76, in Ferrol
    - Light Anti-aircraft Artillery Group I/76
    - Light Anti-aircraft Artillery Group II/76

==== Engineer Command ====
- Command Headquarters, in Fuencarral
  - Special Engineer Regiment No. 11, in Salamanca
    - Road Building Battalion I/11
    - Construction Battalion II/11
  - Bridge and Special Engineer Regiment No. 12, in Zaragoza
  - Railway Engineer Regiment No. 13, in Cuatro Vientos
  - Railway Mobilization and Operations Regiment No. 14, in Fuencarral

==== Signal Command ====
- Command Headquarters, in El Pardo
  - Tactical Signal Regiment No. 21, in El Pardo
  - Special Signal Regiment No. 22, in Madrid

=== Army Logistic Support Command ===
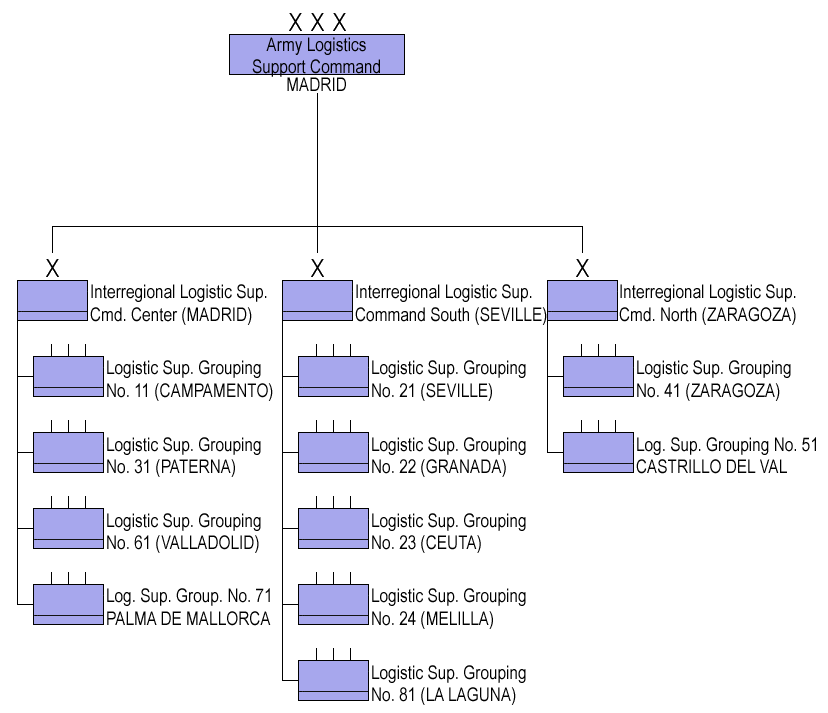
Army Logistic Support Command organization (click to enlarge)

The three interregional logistic support commands were created in 1987 and subordinates to the Army Logistic Support Command. Each logistic support grouping managed all the vehicle parks, workshops, ammunition magazines and other logistic services in their assigned area.

- Command Headquarters, in Madrid
  - Interregional Logistic Support Command Center, in Madrid
    - Logistic Support Grouping No. 11, in Campamento (supporting the I Military Region)
    - Logistic Support Grouping No. 31, in Paterna (supporting the III Military Region)
    - Logistic Support Grouping No. 61, in Valladolid (supporting the VI Military Region)
    - Logistic Support Grouping No. 71, in Palma de Mallorca (supporting the Balearic Military Zone)
  - Interregional Logistic Support Command South, in Seville
    - Logistic Support Grouping No. 21, in Seville (supporting the II Military Region)
    - Logistic Support Grouping No. 22, in Granada (supporting the II Military Region)
    - Logistic Support Grouping No. 23, in Ceuta (supporting the Ceuta General Command)
    - Logistic Support Grouping No. 24, in Melilla (supporting the Melilla General Command)
    - Logistic Support Grouping No. 81, in La Laguna and Las Palmas (supporting the Canary Military Zone)
  - Interregional Logistic Support Command North, in Zaragoza
    - Logistic Support Grouping No. 41, in Zaragoza (supporting the IV Military Region)
    - Logistic Support Grouping No. 51, in Castrillo del Val (supporting the V Military Region)

The logistic support groupings No. 71 and No. 81 operationally assigned to the Balearic Military Zone respectively the Canary Military Zone.

== Graphic overview of the Spanish Army in 1990 ==
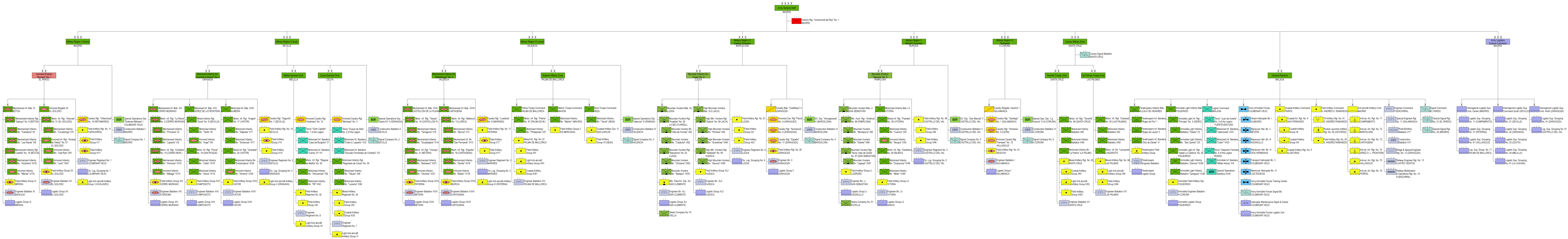
Structure of the Spanish Army in 1990 (click to enlarge)

== Geographic distribution of the Spanish Army in 1990 ==
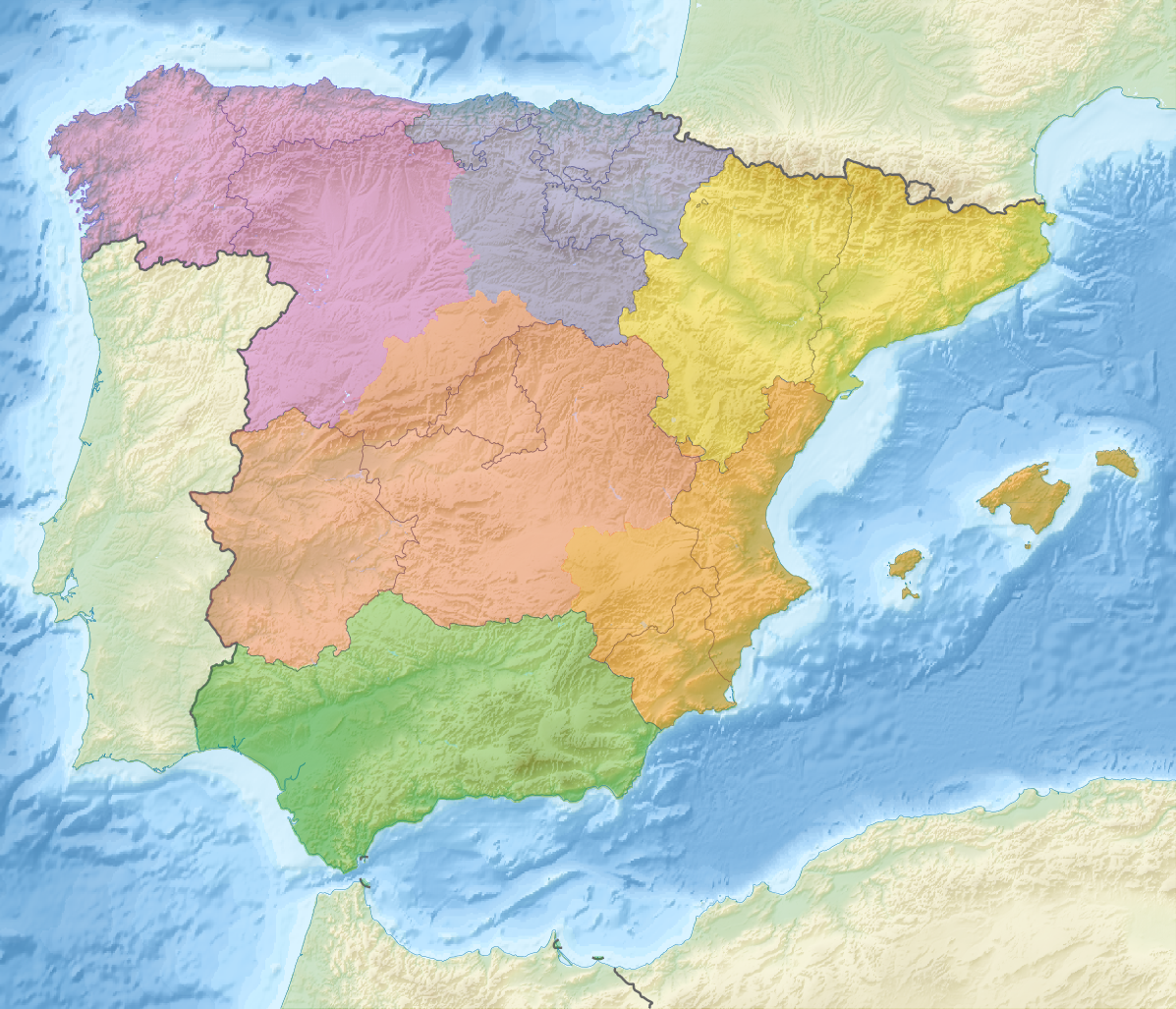
Spanish Army higher command locations in 1990
# 1: Armored Brigade XII, Anti-aircraft Artillery Command, Engineer Command, Signal Command
Off map: Canary Military Zone

== See also ==
- Structure of the Spanish Army for the current structure of the Spanish Army.
