= Carli Palace of Verona =

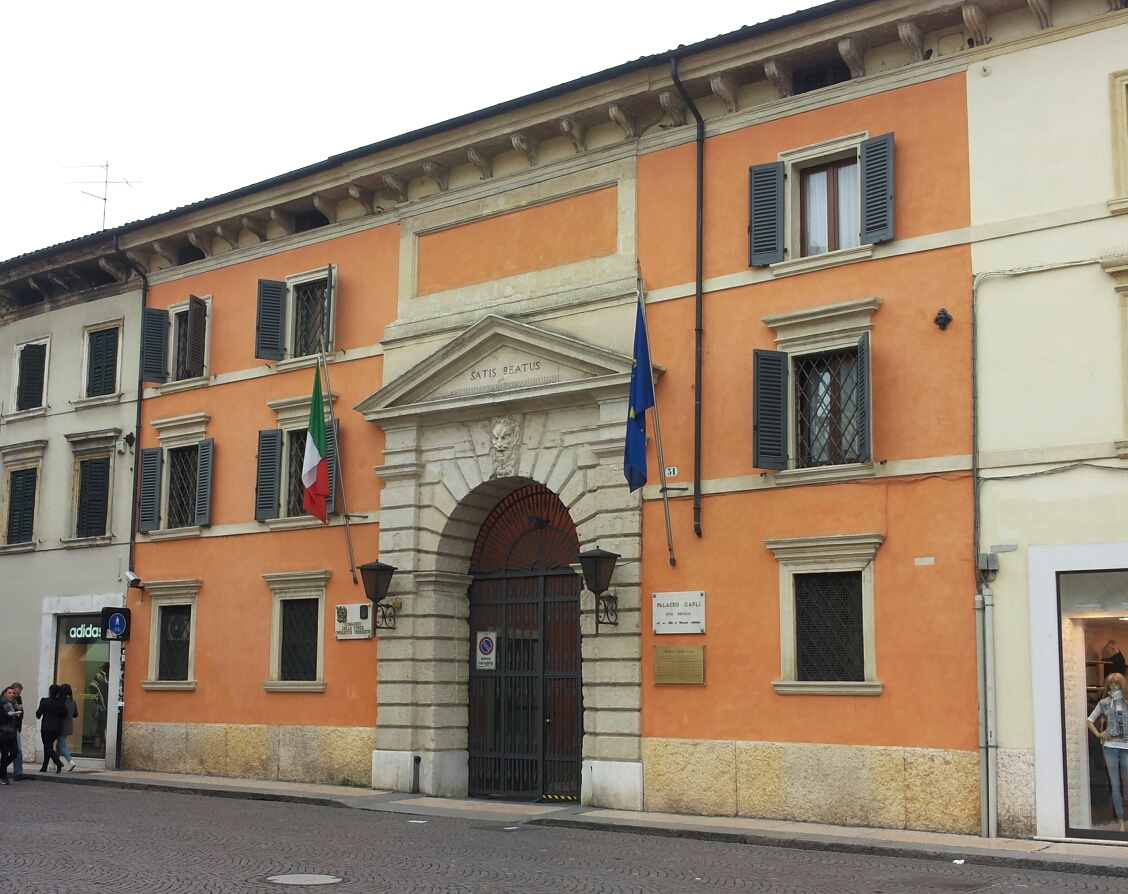
- Facade of the building
- Interactive map of the Carli Palace of Verona area

General information
- Location: Via Roma 31, Verona, Italy

Carli Palace is a Neoclassical style palace located in Via Roma in the city center of Verona.

== History ==
The building was commissioned by Marquis Giuseppe Della Torre in the second half of the 18th century. At his death in 1778, he left the building to his wife Elena Carli. A few years later, her brother Count Alessandro Carli rebuilt the palace improving its structure and, in 1812, he sold it to the Basilea brothers.

In 1839 the building was purchased by the Imperial Austrian Authorities as the house of Supremo Imperial Regio Senato di Giustizia del Regno Lombardo Veneto (the Supreme Court of Justice for the Kingdom of Lombardy–Venetia). It performed this function until 1851.

In 1853 the building became Field Marshal Johann Joseph Radetzky's residence, the Lombardo-Veneto Civilian and Military Governor.

In 1857 it was converted into an accommodation for high-rank guests, subsequently in 1859 the Archduke Albrecht, Duke of Teschen, Commander in Chief of the Veneto Army, established his Headquarters.

In October 1866, at the end of the Third War of Independence, the act of ceding of Verona to the Local Municipality was signed here, in the "Sala degli Stucchi".

The building maintained its military functions even under the Kingdom of Italy, as the seat of the Corps Headquarters deployed in Verona.

On February 22, 1951, an Italian four star Army headquarters (HQ) was activated in the building, but on July 10 it became a NATO headquarters, named Allied Land Forces Southern Europe (LANDSOUTH), until 1999, when it was reappointed as JOINT COMMAND SOUTH (JC SOUTH). The headquarters were de-activated on July 1, 2004.

Since 1997, Palazzo Carli has been the seat of the Italian Army Operational Land Forces Command (COMFOTER).

== Architecture ==
The main body perspective on an inner courtyard where there is a beautiful fountain. The facade is divided into three registers, the ground are rusticated arches with Doric pillars, the first floor there is a large central hall with a loggia. Inside they are preserved frescoes of Giambettino Cignaroli, Domenico Pecchio and Marco Marcola.

== Bibliography ==
- T. Lenotti, Palazzi di Verona, Verona, Vita veronese, 1964.
- F. Dal Forno, Case e palazzi di Verona, Verona, Banca popolare di Verona, 1973.
- P. Floder Reitter, Case palazzi e ville di Verona e provincia, Verona, I.E.T. edizioni, 1997
- G. Forti, La scena urbana: strade e palazzi di Verona e provincia, Verona, Athesis, 2000
- M. Luciolli, Passeggiando tra i palazzi di Verona, Garda, 2003.
- R. Caloi, Palazzo Carli a Verona, Verona, 2009.

== Related items ==
- Verona Austrian
- Monuments of Verona
- History of Verona
