= Empalme (Madrid Metro) =

Madrid Metro station

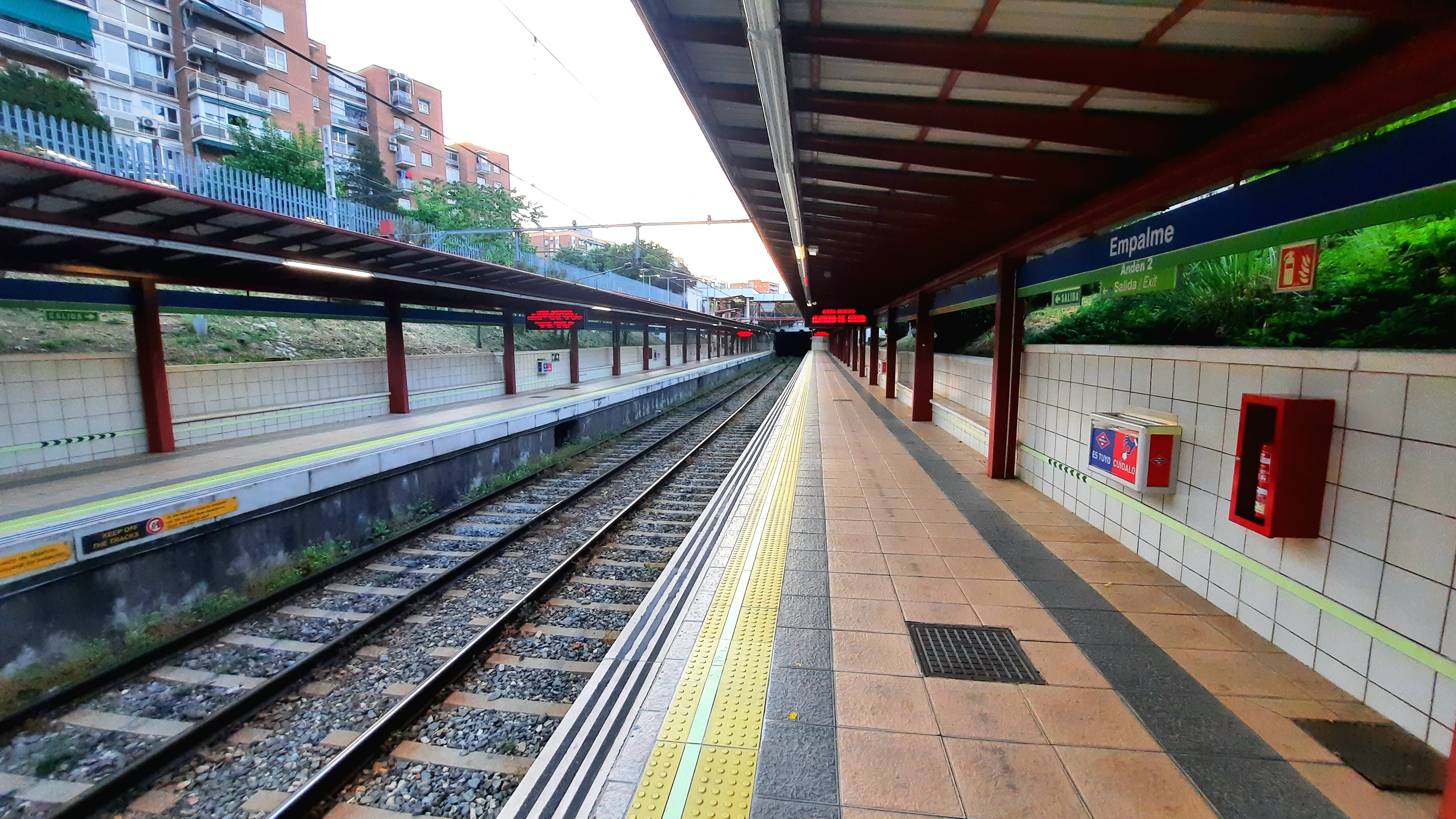

General information
- Location: Latina, Madrid; Spain
- Coordinates: 40.3905726°N 3.7653479°W
- System: Madrid Metro station
- Owner: CRTM
- Operator: CRTM

Construction
- Accessible: Yes

Other information
- Fare zone: A

History
- Opened: 4 February 1961

Services
Preceding station	Madrid Metro	Following station
Aluche towards Alameda de Osuna	Line 5	Campamento towards Casa de Campo
Location
- Location within Madrid

Empalme [emˈpalme] is a station on Line 5 of the Madrid Metro. Its name (literally "Junction") is derived from the old Línea Madrid-Almorox, where there was a station called "Empalme-Goya" (Goya Junction). where It is located in fare Zone A.
