= Campamento (Madrid Metro) =

Madrid Metro station

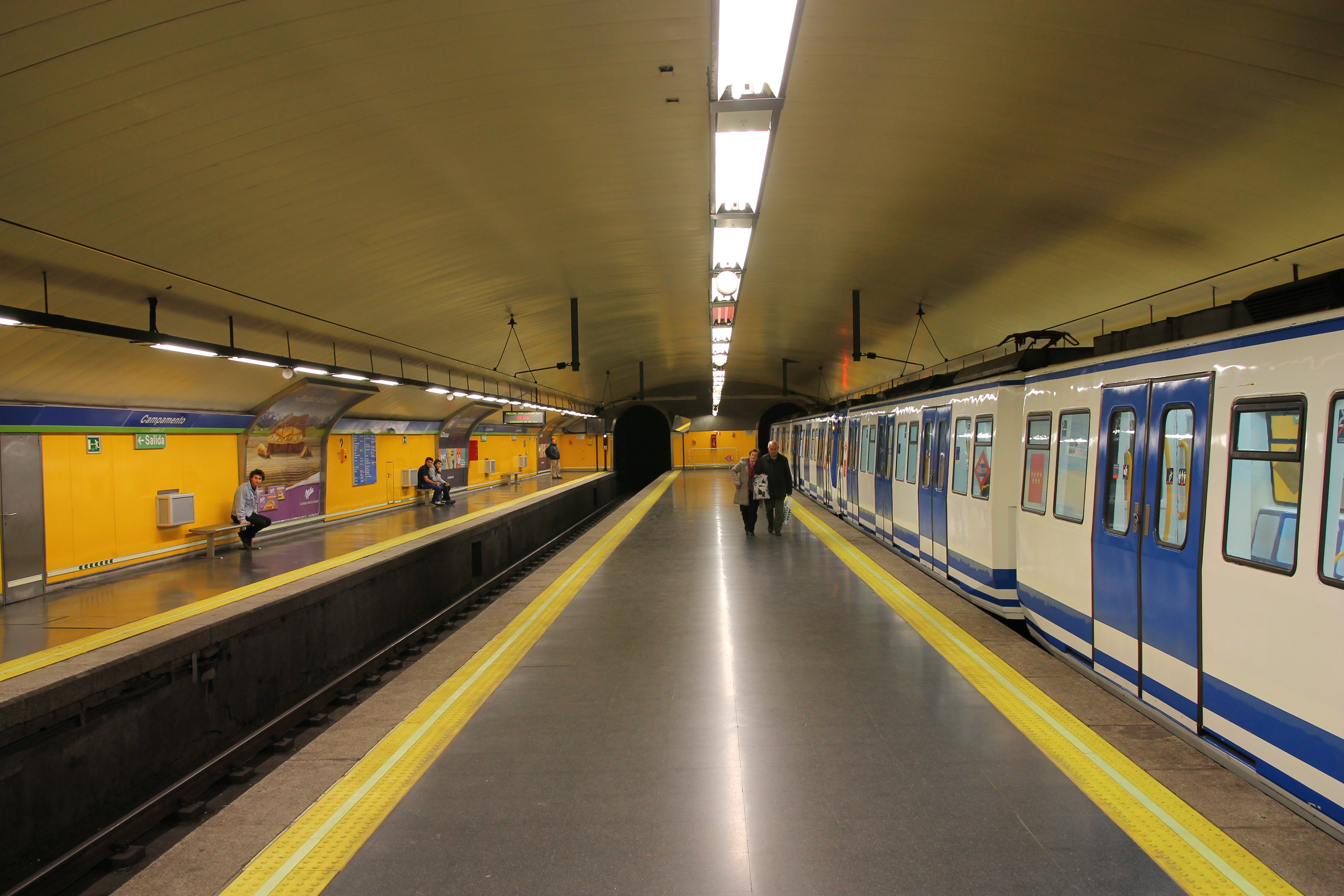
- Platforms of the station

General information
- Location: Latina, Madrid; Spain
- Coordinates: 40.3948064°N 3.7681294°W
- System: Madrid Metro station
- Owner: CRTM
- Operator: CRTM

Construction
- Accessible: No

Other information
- Fare zone: A

History
- Opened: 4 February 1961

Services
Preceding station	Madrid Metro	Following station
Empalme towards Alameda de Osuna	Line 5	Casa de Campo Terminus
Location
- Location within Madrid

Campamento [kampaˈmento] is a station on Line 5 of the Madrid Metro, serving the Campamento barrio. It is located in Zone A.
