= James L. Dozier =

U.S. Army general (born 1931)

James Lee Dozier
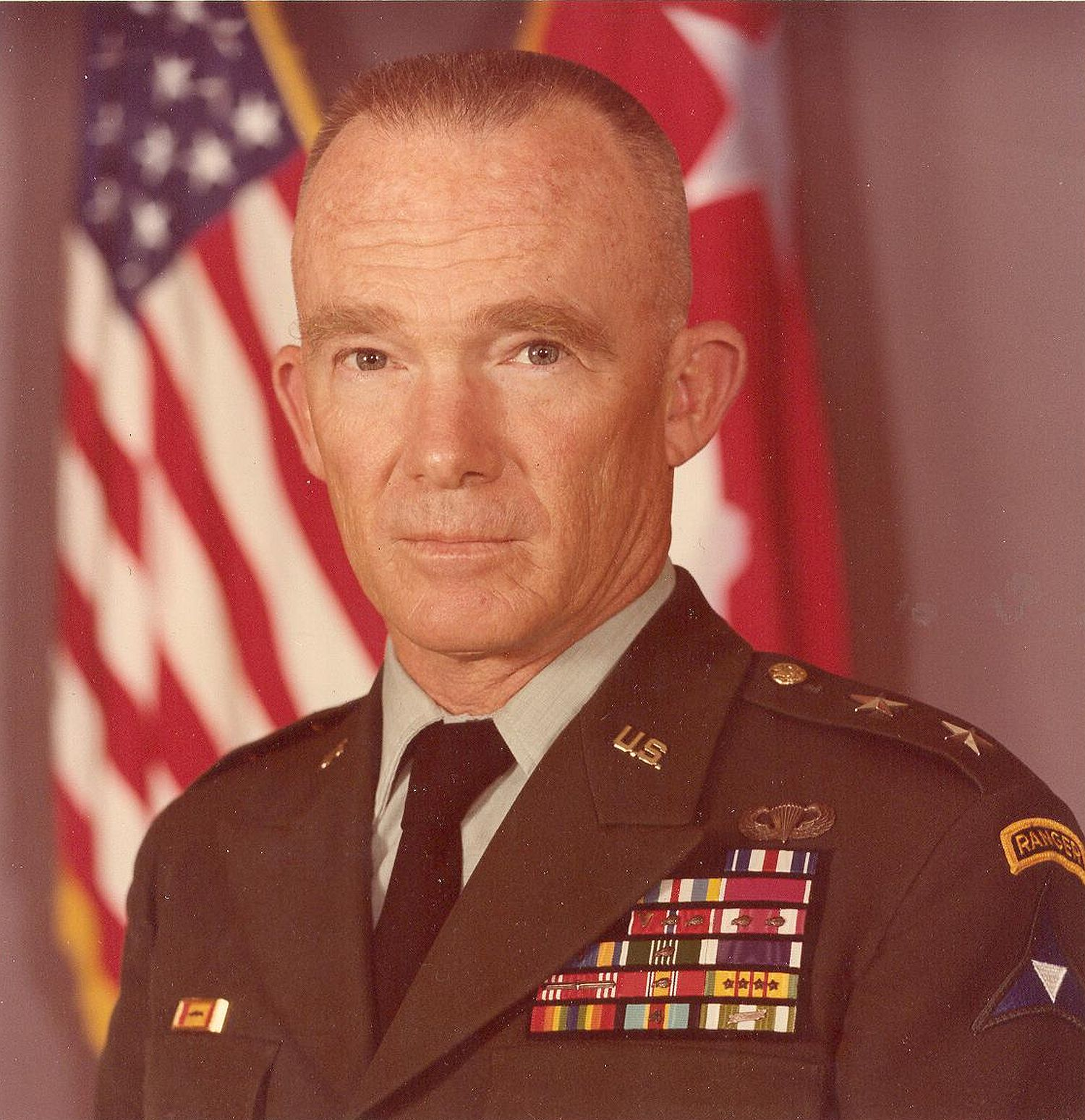
- Born: April 10, 1931 (age 95); Arcadia, Florida, U.S.
- Military career
- Allegiance: United States
- Branch: United States Army
- Service years: 1950–1985
- Rank: Major general
- Commands: Deputy Chief of Staff at NATO's Southern European land forces
- Conflicts: Cold War: Vietnam War; Years of lead (Italy)
- Awards: Distinguished Service Medal; Silver Star; Defense Superior Service Medal; Legion of Merit; Bronze Star (3)

James Lee Dozier (born April 10, 1931) is a retired United States Army officer. In December 1981, he was kidnapped by the Italian Red Brigades, a Marxist–Leninist guerilla group. After 42 days of captivity, he was rescued by NOCS – an elite Italian special forces unit – with help from the Intelligence Support Activity's Operation Winter Harvest. At the time, General Dozier was serving as deputy Chief of Staff at NATO's Southern European land forces headquarters in Verona, Italy. In a press statement, the Red Brigades claimed that the excellent diplomatic relations between the U.S. and Italy—and the fact that Dozier was an American officer invited to work in Italy—rendered his abduction "justified". To date, he remains the only American flag officer ever taken prisoner by a violent non-state actor.

== Early life and military career ==
Dozier was born in Arcadia, Florida. Dozier graduated from the United States Military Academy at West Point in 1956. He was a classmate of General Norman Schwarzkopf. He went to the Armor School at Fort Knox, Kentucky, for basic and advanced training in armored warfare. He served in the Vietnam War with the 11th Armored Cavalry Regiment from 1968 to 1969, where he was awarded the Silver Star medal, and later served tours of duty at the Pentagon and in West Germany. Dozier also graduated from the U.S. Military Academy with a Bachelor of Science degree in engineering. He later earned a Master of Science degree in aerospace engineering from the University of Arizona. Dozier attended the Army Command and General Staff College and the Army War College.

== Kidnapping ==
At the time, Brigadier General Dozier was kidnapped from his apartment in Verona at approximately 6 pm on December 17, 1981, by four men posing as plumbers. It was later reported that as many as four additional terrorists provided support using multiple vehicles. Although his wife, Judy Dozier, was not kidnapped, she was briefly held at gunpoint to coerce Dozier into compliance, and the terrorists left her bound and chained in the apartment's laundry room. Judy Dozier was rescued after she generated enough noise by leaning against the washing machine and hitting it with her shoulders and knees, which alerted a downstairs neighbor. In his paper The Italian Red Brigades (1969–1984): Political Revolution and Threats to the State, Paul J. Smith, a National Security Affairs professor at the U.S. Naval War College, explains:

For more than a month, Dozier's right wrist and left ankle were chained to a steel cot, which was placed under a small tent. He was also forced to live under the "never-extinguished glare of an electric bulb." Dozier's captors also required him to wear earphones and listen to loud music. During Dozier's captivity, the Red Brigades issued various communiqués to the government and the public generally, describing their demands or complaints. They issued the first communiqué only days after the kidnapping; it was striking for its lack of any ransom demand. Instead it dwelled on international matters of interest to the Red Brigades, including a tribute to the German Red Army Faction. Subsequent communiqués also failed to mention ransom demands and even lacked any particular reference to Dozier. The fifth communiqué, retrieved from a trash can in downtown Rome, contained a number of anti-NATO and anti-American statements but did not make any specific demands for Dozier's release.

Dozier was able to temporarily remove his headphones while his guard was not watching, allowing him to identify morning and evening traffic and thus tell time. He tracked the days in his diary, ending with a count of 40 days—a discrepancy of 2 days from the actual duration of his captivity. Dozier kept a diary by playing Solitaire and recording fabricated scores on paper supplied by his guards. These scores were a base-seven alpha-numeric code developed by Dozier, based on the seven piles of cards used in the card game and the number of cards in each pile.

Dozier was held for 42 days until January 28, 1982, when a team from NOCS (a special operations unit of the Polizia di Stato) rescued him from an apartment in Padua without firing a shot, capturing the entire terrorist cell. The guard Ugo Milani, assigned to kill Dozier in the event of a rescue attempt did not do so, and was overwhelmed by the rescuing force. After his return to the U.S. Army in Vicenza, President Ronald Reagan congratulated him by telephone on regaining his freedom.

== Run for Congress ==
In 1988 Dozier ran as a Republican for the open 13th congressional district of Florida. He finished third with 19% of the vote (18,048), thus missing the run-off that was won by Porter Goss. (Almanac of American Politics 1990 pg. 274-275.)

== Awards and decorations ==
Dozier was later promoted to major general and eventually retired from active military service. During his military career, he was awarded the Army Distinguished Service Medal, Silver Star, and Purple Heart (for actions during Vietnam War), Ranger Tab, and Parachutist Badge.

=== Ribbon bar ===

Parachutist Badge			Ranger tab	
1st row	Army Distinguished Service Medal			
2nd row	Silver Star	Defense Superior Service Medal	Legion of Merit	Bronze Star Medal w/ two OLCs and "V" Device
3rd row	Purple Heart	Meritorious Service Medal w/ OLC	Air Medal w/ OLC	Army Commendation Medal w/ OLC
4th row	Army Good Conduct Medal	National Defense Service Medal w/ service star	Vietnam Service Medal w/ four service stars	Vietnam Campaign Medal
Vietnam Gallantry Cross Unit Citation

== See also ==
- Barbara Balzerani
- Licio Giorgieri
