= Nucleo Operativo Centrale di Sicurezza =

Police tactical unit in Italy

Central Security Task Group
- Nucleo Operativo Centrale di Sicurezza (Italian)
- Official Insignia
- Active: 1978 - present
- Country: Italy
- Agency: Polizia di Stato
- Type: Police tactical unit
- Role: Counter-terrorism; Law enforcement
- Part of: Direzione Centrale della Polizia di Prevenzione
- Motto: "Sicut Nox Silentes"; Silent as the Night
- Abbreviation: NOCS

Commanders
- Current commander: Antonino Giralda Basile
- Notable commanders: Andrea Mainardi: Andrea Sgandurra; Maurizio Genolini; Edoardo Perna; Paolo Gropuzzo

The Nucleo Operativo Centrale di Sicurezza (NOCS) (lit. 'Central Security Task Group') is the police tactical unit of the Polizia di Stato, one of Italy's national police forces. It operates under the command of the Direzione Centrale della Polizia di Prevenzione (English: Central Directorate for the Anti-Terrorism Police).

== History ==
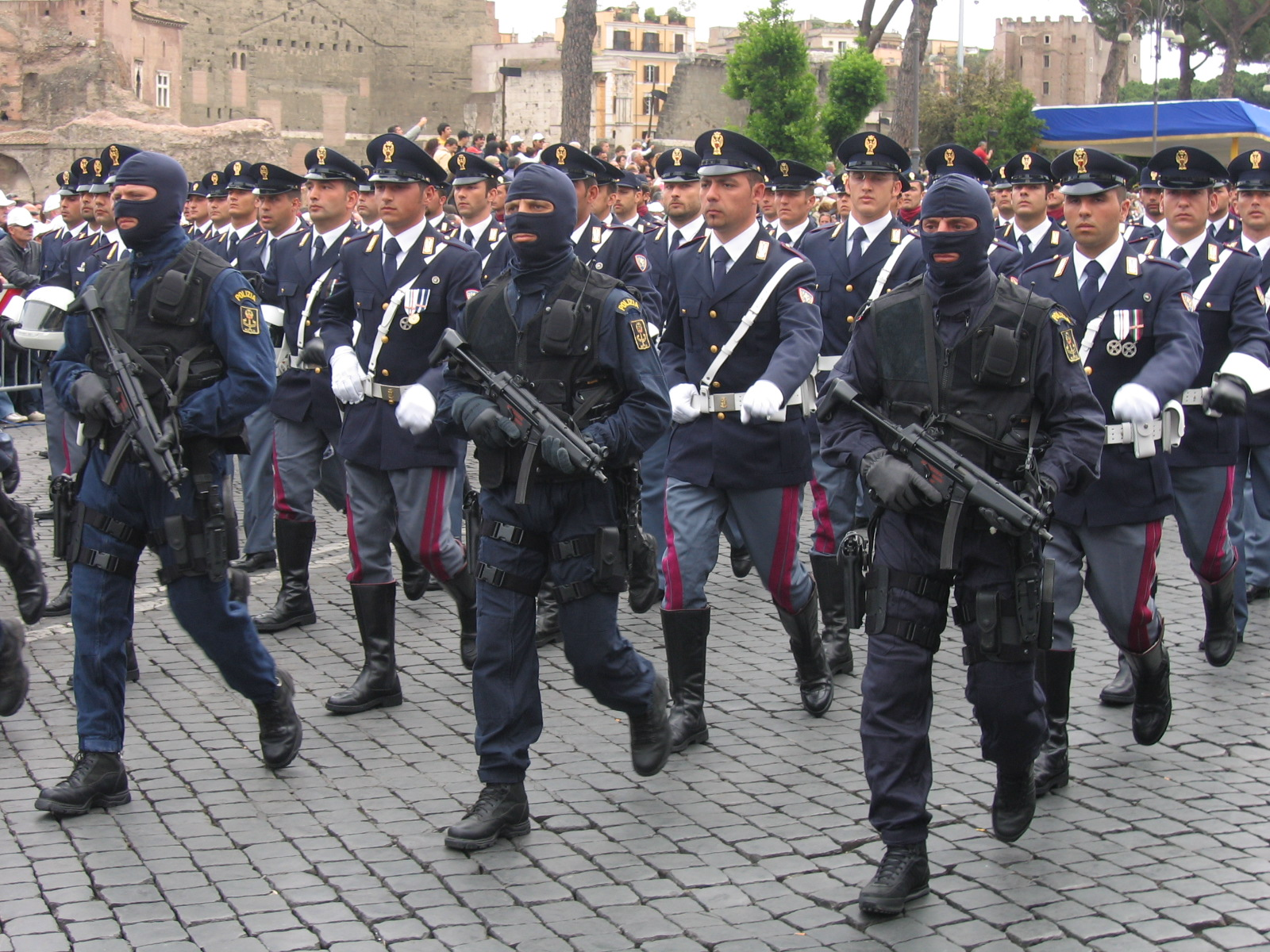
Photo of Army Parade in Rome, 2 June 2006, Republic Day. NOCS special groups

In 1974, the Chief of the Polizia di Stato Anti-Terrorism Bureau, Emilio Santillo, announced the necessity to establish a tactical unit with the capability to arrest known terrorists and to support the local counter-terrorism field office. Personnel were selected from Police Sports Group "Fiamme Oro ("Gold Flames"), particularly trained in martial arts. The 35-man team was denominated "counter-commando unit" and commanded by Maj. Andrea Sgandurra, an officer with counter-insurgency experiences, and a skilled proponent of hand-to-hand combat skills. After one year of training (offensive driving, sniping, various shooting skills, and a tactical assault course) in 1975, the unit became operational and immediately started a mission against the left wing terrorist organization NAP ("Nuclei Armati Proletari", Proletarian Armed Service). Later they operated against the right-wing group "New Order", which resulted in the arrests of well-known terrorists Gentile Schiavone and Pierluigi Concutelli. In 1978, the Italian government decided to modify the structure of the Anti-Terrorist Bureau to improve its capabilities. This change resulted in the formation of SISMI (military intelligence), SISDE (civilian intelligence), and a police counter-terrorism agency (Ufficio Centrale per le Investigazioni Generali e le Operazioni Speciali (UCIGOS) also known as the Central Office for General Investigations and Special Operations). This office was the only one responsible for Italian counter-terrorism. The UCIGOS's tactical unit became the NOCS (Nucleo Operativo Centrale di Sicurezza, Central Security Operations Service), the old counter-commando unit with far more operatives, training, and responsibilities. During its 22 years of existence, NOCS has performed more than 4,500 missions and 205 arrests. The 25–42 operatives studied terrorist methodology and created innovative tactics and procedures. Their motto is Sicut Nox Silentes (As Silent as Night).

In 1982 under the tactical command of Captain Edoardo Perna a 12-man section, without firing a single shot, freed Brigadier General James Dozier, who had been held hostage by Red Brigades terrorists. In the following years NOCS expanded in size and capabilities and under new command, then Major Maurizio Genolini, became a full-fledged counter-terrorism unit, with capabilities of operations on aircraft, trains, buses, embassies, and stadium areas and established good relations with several counter-terrorism units in the western world.

Recently, NOCS has undergone another change and become the Anti-Terrorism Special Operations Division. The unit improved capabilities in C3I and a computer and video section was added. NOCS was innovative regarding the incorporation of computers in training formalizing this with the addition of a separate video section. NOCS also expanded its training in VIP protection and driving, augmented by training with the well-established United States Secret Service. This relationship sparked the creation of a unit similar in form and function to United States Secret Service counter-terrorism teams as well. VIP protection is not a main mission for NOCS, but they are responsible for this duty when high-risk personalities come to Italy.

In 2017, NOCS revealed that a female operator, known as "Marta", became part of the operational unit of the department, one of the first cases in European law enforcement where a woman is recruited in a police-tactical unit.

== Structure ==
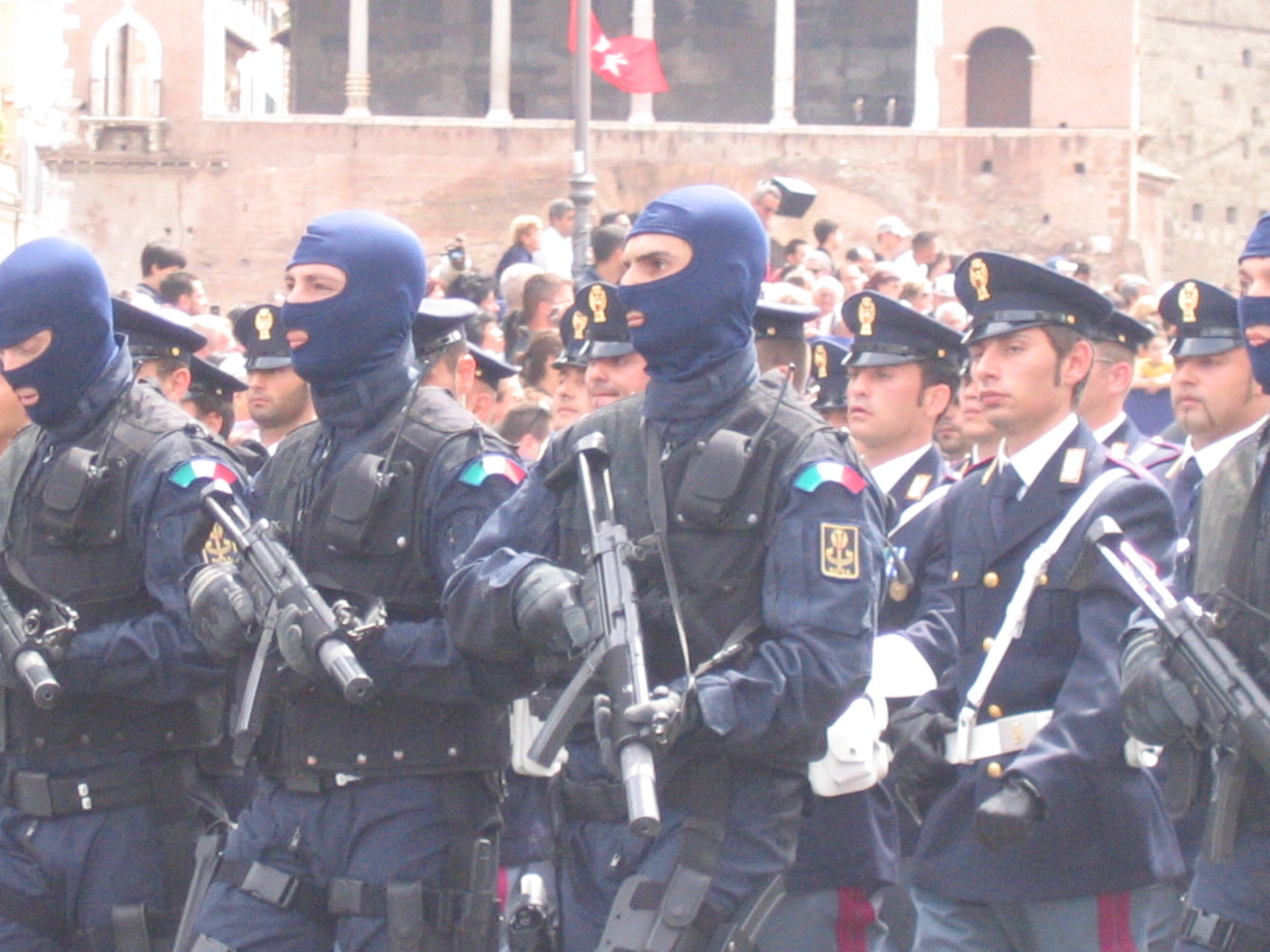
The NOCS

Today, SOD/NOCS have three tactical assault teams and one protection division. All operatives have HALO jump training, explosive ordnance disposal training, sniper and combat shooting. Several operatives have scuba diving training as well. SOD has a logistics branch with specialized personnel in support of operatives. NOCS has several specialized vehicles, operated by specially trained drivers. The basic training lasts six months and is followed by an advanced training program lasting an additional six months.

Prospective recruits must have at least four years of service with the PS and be at least 28 years old when they enlist.

== Equipment ==
Name	Country of origin	Type
Colt Python	United States	Revolver
Beretta 92FS	Italy	Semi-automatic pistol
Beretta Px4 Storm	Italy	Semi-automatic pistol
Glock	Austria	Semi-automatic pistol
Heckler & Koch MP5	Germany	Submachine gun
Heckler & Koch MP7	Germany	Submachine gun
Socimi Type 821	Italy	Submachine gun
Franchi SPAS-12	Italy	Shotgun
Beretta AR70/90	Italy	Assault rifle
Beretta ARX-160	Italy	Assault rifle
Heckler & Koch G36C	Germany	Assault rifle
Heckler & Koch PSG-1	Germany	Sniper rifle
Sako TRG	Finland	Sniper rifle
