= History of Valencia CF =

History of the Spanish football club

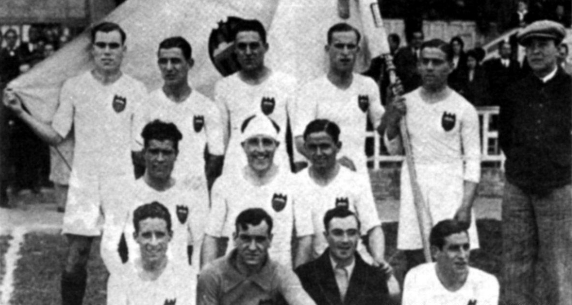
Valencia CF squad in 1931

Valencia CF was established on 5 March 1919 and officially approved on 18 March 1919, with Octavio Augusto Milego Díaz as its first president; incidentally the presidency was decided by a coin toss. The club played its first competitive match away from home on 21 May 1919 against Valencia Gimnástico, and lost the match 1–0.

Valencia CF moved into the Mestalla stadium in 1923, having played its home matches at the Algirós ground since 7 December 1919. The first match at Mestalla pitted the home side against Castellón Castalia and ended a 0–0 draw. In another match the day after, Valencia won against the same opposition 1–0. Valencia CF won the Regional Championship in 1923, and was eligible to play in the domestic Copa del Rey cup competition for the first time in its history.

== 1940s: Emergence as a giant in Spanish football ==
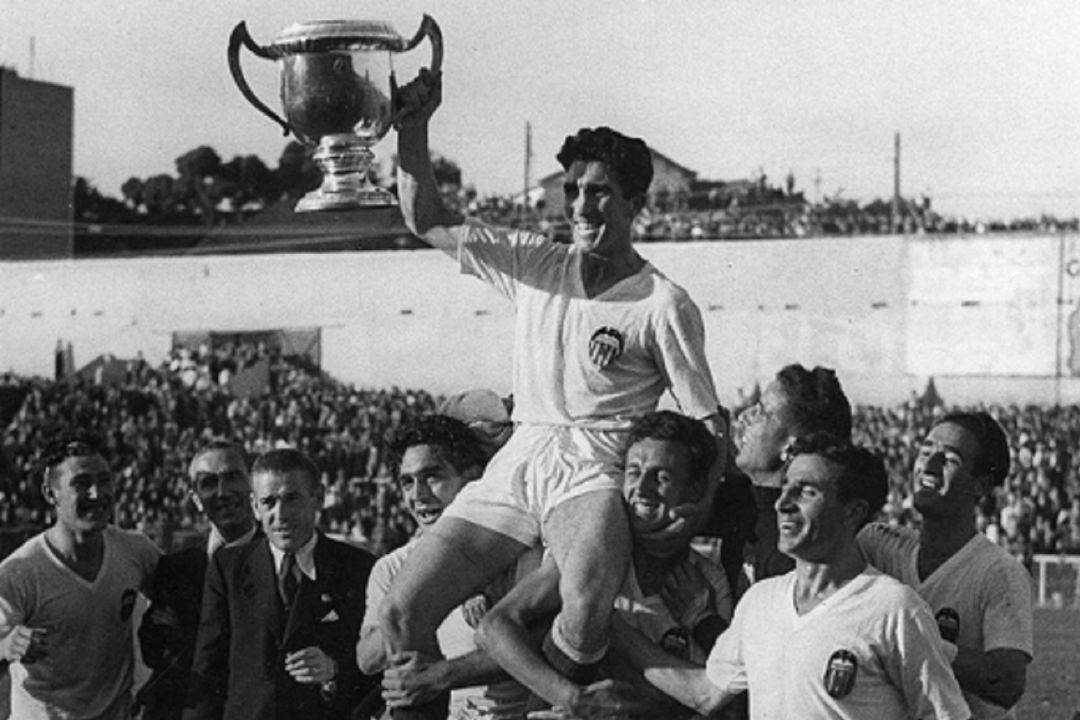
Players of Valencia celebrating their first Copa del Rey title in 1941

The Spanish Civil War halted the progress of the Valencia team until 1941, when it won the Copa del Rey, beating RCD Espanyol in the final. In the 1941–42 season, the club won its first Spanish La Liga championship title, although winning the Copa del Rey was more reputable than the championship at that time. The club maintained its consistency to capture the league title again in the 1943–44 season, as well as the 1946–47 league edition. They would conclude their decade of success by winning the 1949 Copa del Rey, this would mean Valencia would end the decade with a record of three La Liga titles and two Copa del Reys. This would cement their name in Spanish football.

In the 1950s, the club failed to emulate the success of the 1940s, even though it grew as a club. A restructuring of Mestalla resulted in an increase in spectator capacity to 45,000, while the club had a number of Spanish and foreign stars. Players such as Spanish international Antonio Puchades and Dutch forward Faas Wilkes graced the pitch at Mestalla. In the 1952–53 season, the club finished as runners-up in the La Liga, and in the following season, the club won the Copa del Rey, then known as the Copa del Generalísimo.

== 1960s: European successes in the Fairs Cup ==
While managing indifferent league form in the early 1960s, the club had its first European success in the form of the Inter-Cities Fairs Cup (the forerunner to the UEFA Cup). In the 1961–62 season, Valencia beat FC Barcelona in the final. The 1962–63 edition of the Inter-Cities Fairs Cup final pitted Valencia against Croatian club Dinamo Zagreb, which the Valencians also won. Valencia was again present in the Inter-Cities Fairs Cup final in the 1963–64 season, but was defeated 2–1 by Real Zaragoza from Spain.

== 1970s to early 1980s: More domestic and European glory ==
Former two-time European Footballer of the Year award winner Alfredo Di Stéfano was hired as coach in 1970, and immediately inspired his new club to their fourth La Liga championship and first since 1947. This secured Valencia its first qualification for the prestigious European Cup, contested by the various European domestic champions. Valencia reached the third round of the 1971–72 competition before losing both legs to Hungarian champions Újpesti Dózsa. In 1972 The club also finished runners up both in La Liga and the domestic cup, losing to Real Madrid and Atletico Madrid, respectively. The most notable players of the 1970s era include Austrian midfielder Kurt Jara, forward Johnny Rep of the Netherlands and Argentinian forward Mario Kempes, who became the La Liga topscorer for two consecutive seasons in 1976–77 and 1977–78. Valencia would go on to win the Copa del Rey again in the 1978–79 season, and also capture the European Cup Winners' Cup the next season, after beating English club Arsenal in the final, with Kempes spearheading Valencia's success in Europe.

== Mid to late 1980s: Stagnation and relegation ==
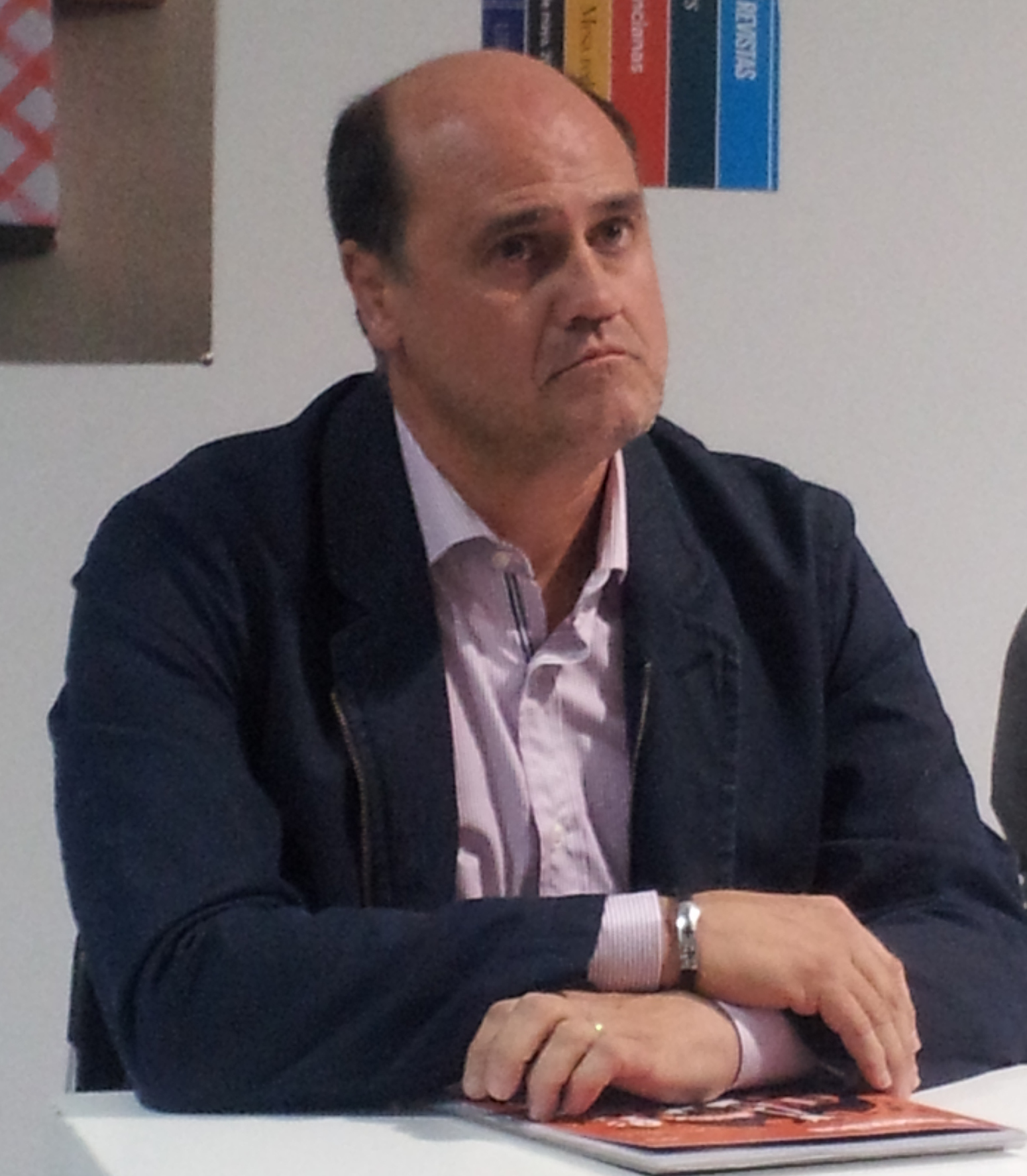
Fernando Gómez Colomer is the player with more appearances for the club with 552

In 1982, the club appointed Miljan Miljanić as coach. After a disappointing season, Valencia was in 17th place and faced relegation with seven games left to play. Koldo Aguirre replaced Miljanić as coach, and Valencia barely avoided relegation that year, relying on favorable results from other teams to ensure their own survival. In the 1983–84 and 1984–85 seasons, the club was heavily in debt under the presidency of Vicente Tormo. The club finally hit rock bottom when it was relegated at the end of the 1985–86 season, and riven with internal problems such as unpaid player and staff wages, as well as poor morale. The club was relegated for the first time after 55 years in Spanish top-flight football.

Arturo Tuzón was named the new club president, and he helped steer Valencia back to La Liga. Alfredo Di Stéfano returned as coach in 1986 and Valencia won promotion again following the 1986–87 season. Di Stéfano stayed on as coach until the 1987–88 season, when the team finished in 14th position in La Liga. Bulgarian forward Luboslav Penev joined the club in 1989, as Valencia aimed to consolidate their place in La Liga. For the 1988-89 La Liga season Valencia finished third, which would signal their competitiveness going into the 1990s.

== 1990s: Re-emergence ==
In the 1989-90 La Liga season Valencia finished runner-up to Real Madrid, and thus qualifying for the UEFA Cup.

Guus Hiddink was appointed as head coach in the 1991–92 season, and the club finished fourth in the League and reached the quarter-finals of the Copa del Rey. In 1992, Valencia CF officially became a Sporting Limited Company, and retained Hiddink as their coach until 1993.

Brazilian coach Carlos Alberto Parreira, fresh from winning the 1994 FIFA World Cup with the Brazil national team, became manager at Mestalla in 1994. Parreira immediately signed Spanish goalkeeper Andoni Zubizarreta, Russian forward Oleg Salenko, and Predrag Mijatović, but failed to produce results expected of him. He was replaced by new coach José Manuel Rielo. The club's earlier successes continued to elude it, although it was not short of top coaching staff like Luis Aragonés and Jorge Valdano, as well as foreign star forwards like Brazilian Romário, Claudio López, Ariel Ortega from Argentina, and Adrian Ilie from Romania. In the 1995-96 La Liga season, Valencia finished second to Atletico Madrid but were unable to capture the title after a close fought race.

Valencia would struggle for the next two seasons but the 1998-99 La Liga season would signal the start of one of Valencia's most successful periods in their history, they won their first trophy in nineteen years by winning the 1998-99 Copa del Rey under Claudio Ranieri and also qualifying for the UEFA Champions League.

== 2000s: Return to the top of Spanish and European football ==
Valencia started the 1999–00 season by winning another title, the Spanish Super Cup, beating FC Barcelona. Valencia finished third in the league, four points behind the champions Deportivo de La Coruña and level on points with second placed Barça. But the biggest success was in the UEFA Champions League; for the first time in its history, Valencia reached the European Cup final. However, in the final played in Paris on 24 May 2000, Real Madrid beat Valencia 3–0.

It was also Claudio López's farewell, as he had agreed to sign for the Italian side Lazio, also leaving was Farinós for Internazionale and Gerard for Barcelona. The notable signings of that summer were John Carew, Rubén Baraja, Roberto Ayala, Vicente Rodríguez, and the Brazilian left back Fábio Aurélio. Also bought that season was Pablo Aimar in January. Baraja, Aimar, Vicente, and Ayala would soon become a staple of Valencia's dominance of the early 2000s in La Liga.

2000 UEFA Champions League Final starting lineup

Valencia started the championship on the right foot and were top of the league after 10 games. After the Christmas break, however, Valencia started to pay for the top demand that such an absorbing competition like the Champions League requires. After passing the two mini-league phases, Héctor Cúper's team eliminated Arsenal in quarter-finals and Leeds United in the semi-finals, and got ready to face Bayern Munich in the big final; Valencia had reached two European Cup finals in a row. This time, the final was to be played in Milan at the San Siro on 23 May. Gaizka Mendieta gave Valencia the lead by scoring from the penalty spot right at the start of the match. Goalkeeper Santiago Cañizares then stopped a penalty from Mehmet Scholl, but Stefan Effenberg drew level after the break thanks to another penalty. After extra time, it went to penalties, where a Mauricio Pellegrino miss gave Bayern Champions League glory and dealt Valencia a second-straight exit in the finals. Valencia went on to slip to fifth place in La Liga and out of Champions League contestation for the 2001–02 season. The final game of the season meant Valencia only needed a draw at the Camp Nou against Barcelona to seal Champions League qualification. Los Che lost to Barcelona 3–2 at the Nou Camp, with a last minute goal from Rivaldo resulting in Barcelona qualifying for the Champions League while Valencia missed out.

The president, D. Pedro Cortés, resigned for personal reasons and left the club in July, with the satisfaction of having won one Copa del Rey, one Spanish Super Cup, and having been runners-up in two successive Champions League finals. D. Jaime Ortí replaced him as president and expressed his intention on maintaining the good form that had made the club so admired on the European circuit. There were also some changes in the team and staff. Rafael Benítez, after helping CD Tenerife to promotion, replaced Héctor Cúper after the latter became the new coach at Internazionale in Italy. Among the playing squad, Gaizka Mendieta, Didier Deschamps, Luis Milla, and Zlatko Zahovič left, while Carlos Marchena, Mista, Curro Torres, Francisco Rufete, Gonzalo de los Santos, and Salva Ballesta all arrived.

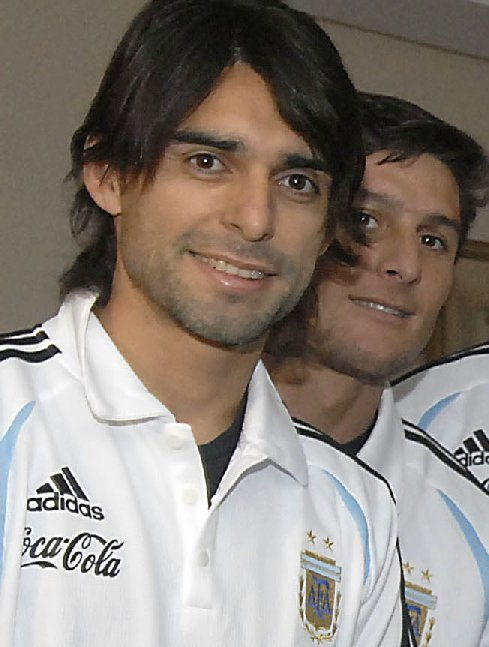
During Valencia's domestic and European dominance of the early 2000s, Argentine Roberto Ayala had been a key component in their defense

From 1999 up until the end of the 2004 season, Valencia had one of their most successful periods in the club's history. With a total of two La Liga titles, one UEFA Cup, one Copa del Rey, and one UEFA Super Cup in those six years, no less than five first class titles and two Champions League finals had been achieved.

That first game against fellow title rivals Real Madrid produced a significant and important victory. This was followed by a record of 11 games won consecutively, breaking the existing one set in the 1970–71 season, the season they had last won the La Liga title under Alfredo Di Stéfano.

After a defeat in A Coruña against Deportivo on 9 December 2001, the team had to win against RCD Espanyol in the Estadi Olímpic Lluís Companys to prevent falling further behind the league leaders. Valencia were 2–0 down at half time, but a comeback in the second half saw Valencia win 3–2.

In the second part of the season, Benítez's team suffered a small setback after losing 1–0 in the Santiago Bernabéu to Real Madrid, but they recovered from this setback and achieved four victories and two draws in the following six games against UD Las Palmas, Athletic Bilbao, Deportivo Alavés, Real Zaragoza, and Barça.

2001 UEFA Champions League Final starting lineup

In one of those crucial games that they would come up against Espanyol, Valencia were trailing 1–0 half-time and a man down too with the dismissal of Carboni, but after two goals from Rubén Baraja, Valencia achieved a 2–1 victory. Furthermore, Real Madrid's defeat in Anoeta to Real Sociedad left Valencia with a three-point lead at the top of the table.

The final game of the season was at La Rosaleda to face Málaga CF, on 5 May 2002, a date that has gone down in Valencia's history. The team shut itself away in Benalmádena, close to the scene of the game, in order to gain focus. An early goal from Roberto Ayala and another close to half-time from Fábio Aurélio assured them their fifth La Liga title, 31 years after their last title win.

The 2002–03 season was a disappointing one for Valencia, as they failed in their attempt to retain the La Liga title and ended up outside of the Champions League spots in fifth, behind Celta de Vigo. They were also knocked out in the quarter-finals of the Champions League by Internazionale on away goals. The 2003–04 season saw Valencia trailing the longtime leaders Real Madrid. In February, after 26 games played, Real Madrid were eight points clear. However, their form declined in the late season and they lost their last five games of the campaign, allowing Valencia to overtake them and win the title. The club added the UEFA Cup to this success. Valencia had now been La Liga champions twice in three seasons.

In the summer of 2004, coach Rafael Benítez decided to leave the club, stating he had had problems with the club president; he would soon become manager of Liverpool. He was replaced by former Valencia coach Claudio Ranieri, who had recently been sacked by Chelsea. His second reign at the club was a disappointment, however, as Valencia harboured realistic hopes of retaining their La Liga crown but, by February, found themselves in seventh place. Valencia had also been knocked out of the Champions League group phase, with Ranieri being sacked promptly in February. The 2004–05 season ended with Valencia outside of the UEFA Cup spots.

In the summer of 2005, Getafe CF coach Quique Flores was appointed as the new manager of Valencia and ended the season in third place, which in turn gained Valencia a place in the Champions League after a season away from the competition. The 2006–07 season was a season with many difficulties, a season which started with realistic hopes of challenging for La Liga was disrupted with a huge list of injuries to key players and internal arguments between Flores and new Sporting Director Amedeo Carboni. Valencia ended the season in fourth place and were knocked out of the Champions League at the quarter-finals stage by Chelsea 3–2 on aggregate, after knocking out Italian champions Inter in the second round. In the summer of 2007, the internal fight between Flores and Carboni was settled with Carboni being replaced by Ángel Ruiz as the new Sporting Director of Valencia.

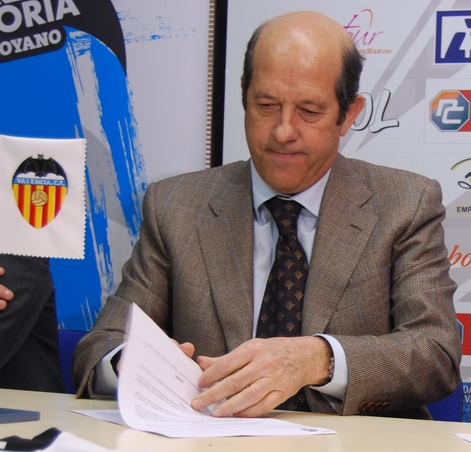
35th president of Valencia Manuel Llorente

On 29 October 2007, the Valencia board of directors fired Flores after a string of disappointing performances and caretaker manager Óscar Rubén Fernández took over on a temporary basis until a full-time manager was found, rumoured to be either Marcello Lippi or José Mourinho. A day later, Dutch manager Ronald Koeman announced he would be leaving PSV to sign for Valencia. But there was still no improvement; in fact, Valencia even went on to drop to the 15th position in the league, just two points above the relegation zone. Although on 16 April 2008, Valencia lifted the Copa del Rey with a 3–1 victory over Getafe at the Vicente Calderón Stadium. This was the club's seventh Copa title. Five days later, one day after a devastating 5–1 league defeat in Bilbao, Valencia fired Ronald Koeman and replaced him with Voro, who would guide Valencia as Caretaker Manager for the rest of the season. He went on to win the first game since the sacking of Koeman, beating CA Osasuna 3–0 in his first game in charge. Voro would eventually drag Valencia from the relegation battle to a safe mid-table finish of 10th place, finally ending a disastrous league campaign for Los Che.

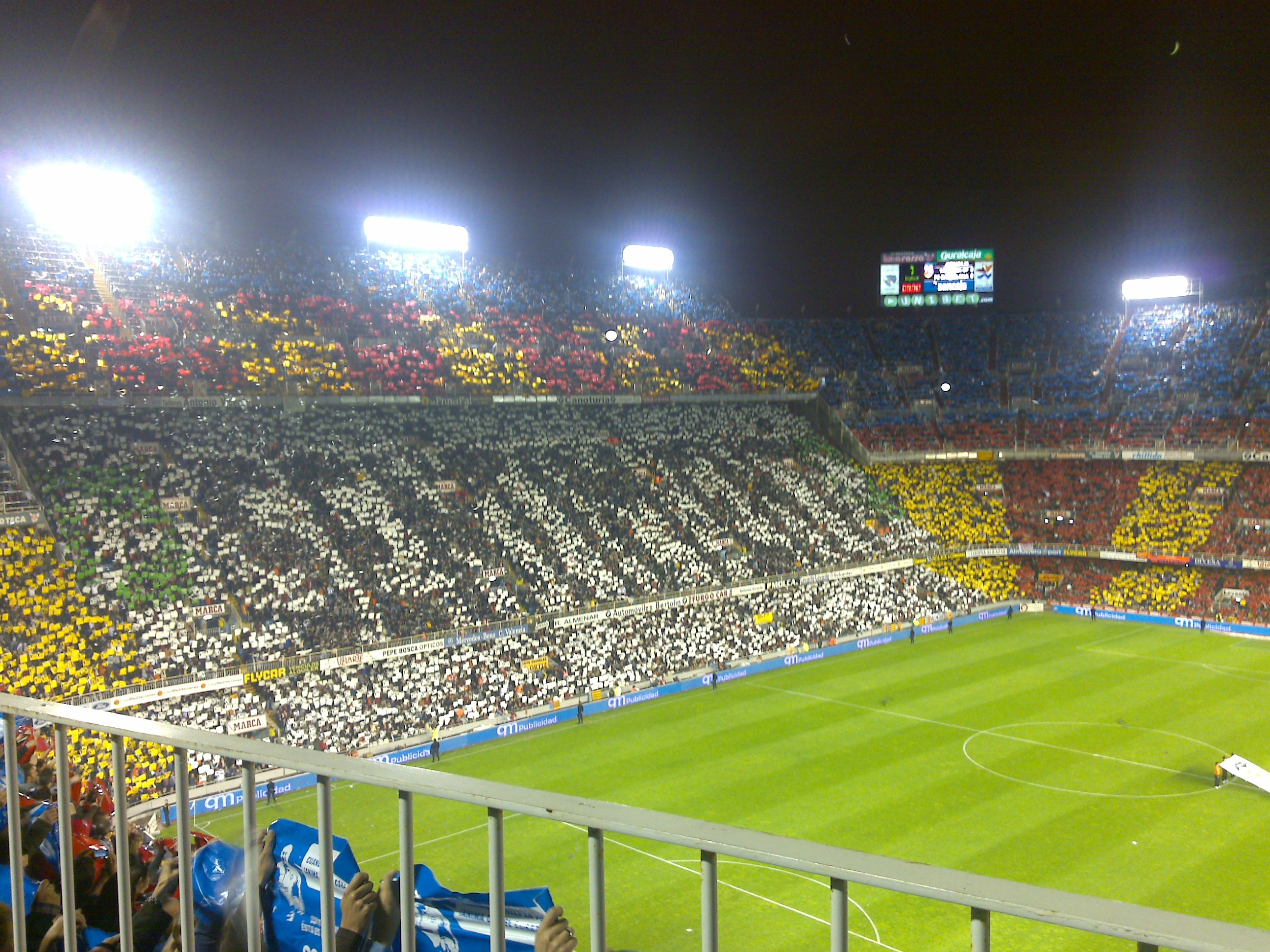
Tifo at Mestalla stadium in 2009

Highly rated Unai Emery was announced as the new manager of Valencia on 22 May 2008. The start of the young manager's career looked to be promising, with the club winning four out of its first five games, a surge that saw the team rise to the top position of the La Liga table. Despite looking impressive in Europe, Los Che then hit a poor run of form in the league that saw them dip as low as seventh in the standings. Amid the slump emerged reports of a massive internal debt at the club exceeding 400 million Euros, as well as that the players had been unpaid in weeks. The team's problems were compounded when they were knocked out of the UEFA Cup by Dynamo Kyiv on away goals. After a run where Valencia took only five points from ten games in La Liga, an announcement was made that the club had secured a loan that would cover the players' expenses until the end of the year. This announcement coincided with an upturn in form, and the club won six of its next eight games to surge back into the critical fourth place Champions' League spot. However, Los Che were then defeated by 4th place rivals Atlético Madrid and Villarreal in two of the last three games of the campaign, and finished sixth in the table, which meant they failed to qualify for a second successive year for the Champions League.

== 2010–2014: Debt issues and stability ==
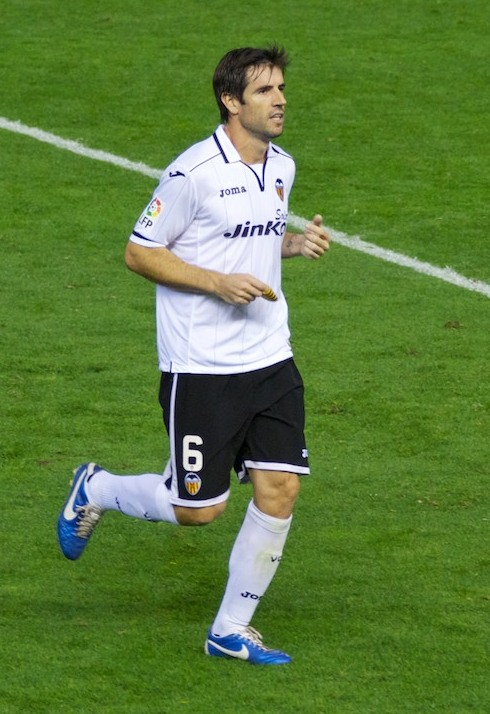
Over the course of 15 seasons and 481 official matches from 1997 to 2013 as well as serving as team captain, defensive midfielder David Albelda became one of the most recognisable players of Valencia CF.

No solution had yet been found to address the massive debt Valencia was faced with, and rumors persisted that top talents such as David Villa, Juan Mata, and David Silva could leave the club to help balance the books. In the first season of the new decade, Valencia returned to the UEFA Champions League for the first time since the 2007–08 season, as they finished comfortably in third in the 2009–10 La Liga season. However, in the summer of 2010, due to financial reasons, David Villa and David Silva were sold to Barcelona and Manchester City, respectively, to reduce the club's massive debt. But, despite the loss of two of the club's most important players, the team was able to finish comfortably in third again 2010–11 La Liga for the second season running, although they were eliminated from the Champions League by German side Schalke 04 in the Round of 16. In the summer of 2011, then-current captain Juan Mata was sold to Chelsea to further help Valencia's precarious financial situation. It was announced by President Manuel Llorente that the club's debt had been decreased and that the work on the new stadium will restart as soon as possible, sometime in 2012.

During the 2012–13 season, Ernesto Valverde was announced as the new manager but after failing to qualify for the Champions League, he stepped down and was replaced by Miroslav Đukić. On 5 July 2013, Amadeo Salvo was named as the new president of the club. Almost a month after Salvo was named president, on 1 August 2013, Valencia sold star striker Roberto Soldado to English club Tottenham Hotspur for a reported fee of €30 million. Miroslav Đukić was sacked six months into the 2013–14 season after just 6 wins in his first 16 matches, Valencia's worst start in 15 years. He was replaced by Juan Antonio Pizzi on 26 December 2013. Under Pizzi, Valencia reached the semi-finals of the UEFA Europa League, where they lost to eventual winners Sevilla on away goals and finished 8th in La Liga despite a disastrous start to the season.

== 2014–present: Peter Lim's ownership ==
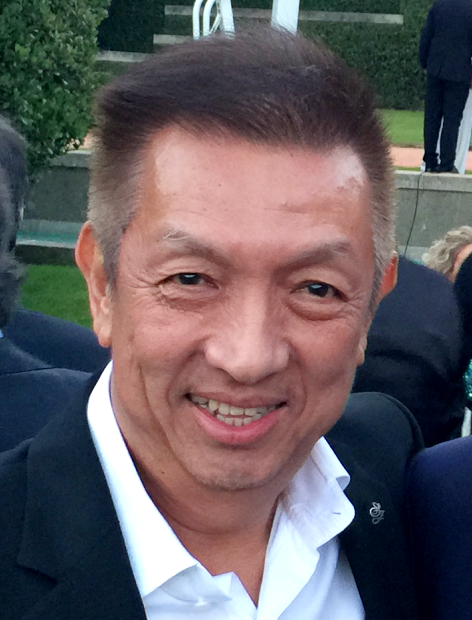
Peter Lim has owned Valencia since 2014

In May 2014, Singaporean businessman Peter Lim was designated by the Fundación Valencia CF as the buyer of 70.4% of the shares owned by the club's foundation. After months of negotiations between Lim and Bankia (the main creditor of the club), an agreement was reached in August 2014. Juan Antonio Pizzi was unexpectedly sacked as head coach and replaced by Nuno Espírito Santo on 2 July 2014. Later, Salvo revealed in an interview that hiring Nuno was one of the conditions Lim had insisted on when buying the club. This raised eyebrows in the media because of Nuno's close relationship with the football agent Jorge Mendes, whose first-ever client was Nuno. Lim and Mendes are also close friends and business partners. Regardless, Nuno's first season was a successful one. Notable signings included Álvaro Negredo, André Gomes and Enzo Pérez, who had just won the LPFP Primeira Liga Player of the Year in the Portuguese Primeira Liga. Valencia finished the 2014–15 season in fourth place for Champions League qualification with 77 points, just one point ahead of Sevilla after a dramatic final week, defeating Granada 4–0.

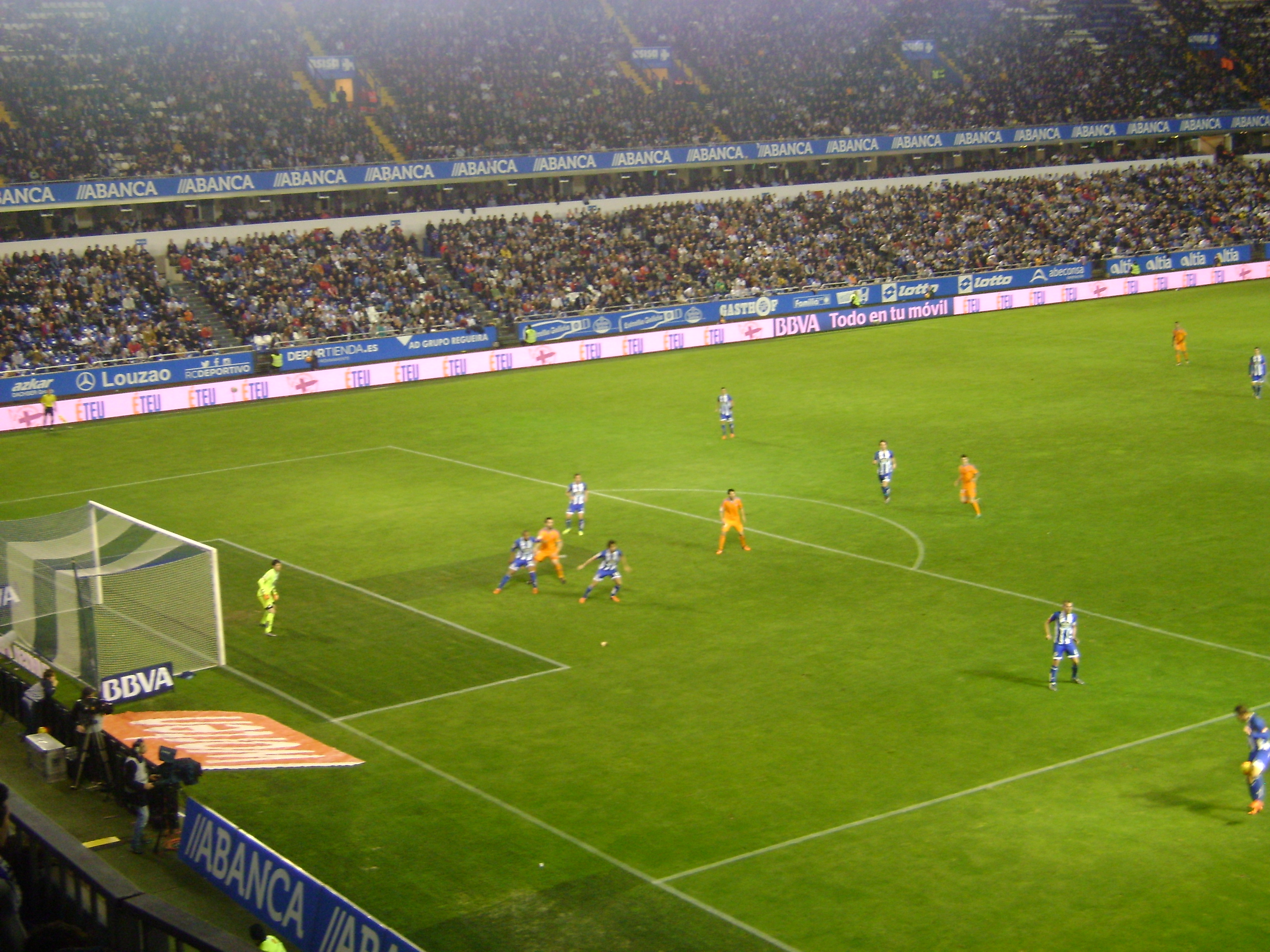
Match between Deportivo de La Coruña and Valencia CF in 2015

On 2 July 2015, Amadeo Salvo resigned from his post as the executive president of Valencia, citing personal reasons. He was a popular figure among the fans. On 10 August 2015, Nicolás Otamendi was sold to Manchester City for £32 million and Aymen Abdennour was signed from Monaco for £22 million as his replacement. Valencia defeated Monaco in the Champions League playoff round with a 4–3 aggregate victory. However, Valencia had a poor start to the 2015–16 season, winning 5 out of 13 matches and failing to progress from the Champions League group stages. The fans were also increasingly concerned about the growing influence of Jorge Mendes in the club's activities. On 29 November, Nuno resigned as manager and former Manchester United defender Gary Neville was hired as his replacement on 2 December. Valencia went winless for nine matches before earning their first win under Neville in a 2–1 victory at home against Espanyol. On 30 March 2016, Neville was sacked after recording the lowest win percentage in La Liga history for a Valencia manager with minimum of five matches, winning just 3 out of 16 matches. He was replaced by Pako Ayestarán, who was brought in by Neville as the assistant coach just one month prior. Valencia finished the season in 12th position.

In the summer of 2016, André Gomes and Paco Alcácer were both sold to Barcelona and Shkodran Mustafi was sold to Arsenal, while Ezequiel Garay and former Manchester United player Nani were brought in. Pako Ayestarán was sacked on 21 September 2016 after four-straight defeats at the beginning of the 2016–17 season. Former Italy national team head coach Cesare Prandelli was hired as his replacement on 28 September. However, he resigned after just three months on 30 December, claiming the club had made him false transfer promises. Days later, on 7 January 2017, Valencia sporting director Jesús García Pitarch also resigned, saying he felt like he was being used as a shield for criticism by the club and that he could not defend something he no longer believed in. Voro was named caretaker manager for the fifth time until the end of season, with Valencia in 17th position and in danger of relegation. However, results improved under Voro and he steered Valencia clear off relegation, ultimately finishing the season in 12th place. On 27 March, Mateu Alemany was named the new director general of Valencia.

The club also announced club president Lay Hoon Chan had submitted her resignation and that she would be replaced by Anil Murthy. After rumors arose of Lim's attempts at selling the club, Murthy assured the fans and local media that Valencia was a long-term project for both him and Lim, and they would not consider selling the club. For the following season, former Villarreal coach Marcelino was named the new manager on 12 May.

After a successful first season under Marcelino, the club secured 4th position and a return to the Champions League. In his second season, they again finished 4th and also reached the semi-finals of the UEFA Europa League. On 25 May 2019, Valencia won the Copa del Rey, upsetting FC Barcelona in the final as they won their first trophy since 2008.

Both Marcelino and sporting director Mateu Alemany, who were credited as the architects of this success, were fired on 11 September 2019 after the former publicly criticized Lim. He was replaced by the ultimately unsuccessful Albert Celades, who was sacked due to poor results, while sporting director César Sanchez resigned that same season, making it six different managers and another six sporting directors by 2020.

For the 2020–21 season, manager Javi Gracia was hired. He was put in charge of a team full of prospects and reserves after the club failed to sign any player during the summer transfer window, but sold key players such as captain Dani Parejo. Local wonderkid Ferran Torres was sold to Manchester City for half his market value. Overall, Valencia sold players worth 85 million euros in order to rebalance the club's books. At the beginning of the season, the club was unable to pay the salaries to the remaining players. After six seasons under Peter Lim's ownership, Valencia CF accumulated losses of 323 million euros, while the value of his biggest investment company, Thomson Medical Group, lost 1.7 billion euros during the same six-year period. Following those years of mismanagement, the playing squad was cut significantly in terms of quality and Lim's ownership has faced strong criticism in Valencia.

In the 2021–2022 season, José Bordalás was hired after spending 5 seasons at Getafe CF. They reached the Copa del Rey final in his first season in charge, where they lost to Real Betis on penalties after a 1-1 draw.
