= Rafael Benítez =

Spanish football manager (born 1960)

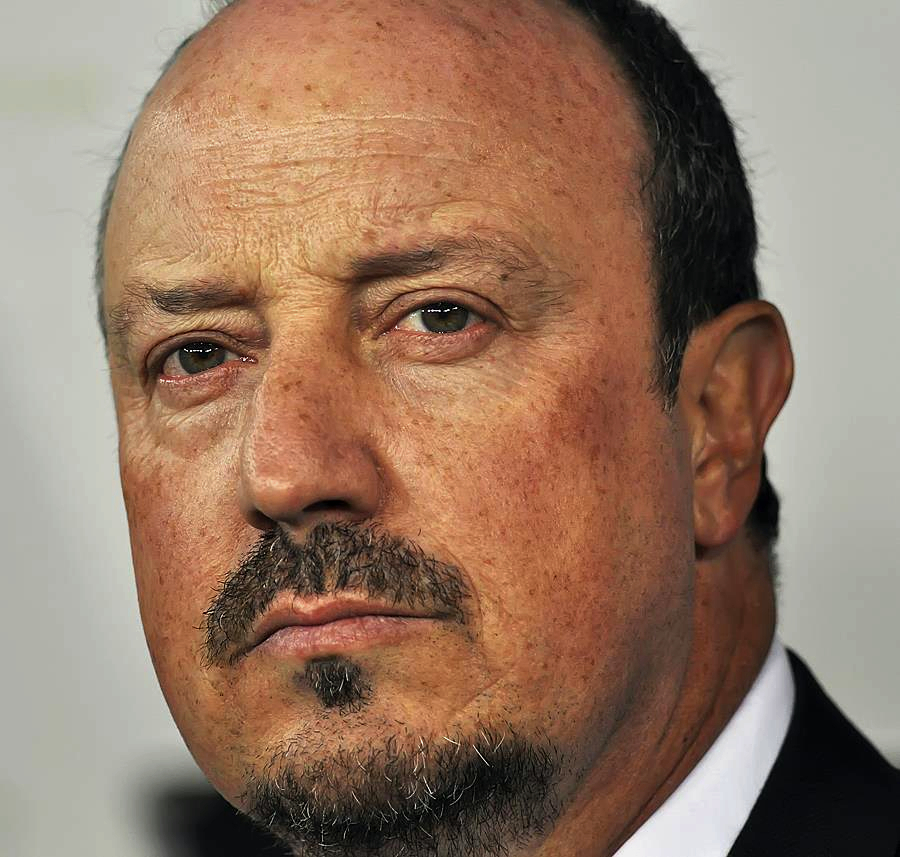
- Benítez in 2015

Personal information
- Full name: Rafael Benítez Maudes
- Date of birth: 16 April 1960 (age 66)
- Place of birth: Madrid, Spain
- Height: 1.75 m (5 ft 9 in)
- Position: Defender

Youth career
- 1973–1978: Real Madrid

Senior career*
Years	Team	Apps	(Gls)
1978–1979	Real Madrid Aficionados		
1979–1981	Real Madrid Castilla		
1981	→ Parla (loan)		
1981–1985	Parla	124	(8)
1985–1986	Linares	34	(7)
Total		158	(15)

International career
1979–1981	Spain Universities XI	5	(0)

Managerial career
- 1993–1994: Real Madrid Castilla
- 1994–1995: Real Madrid Castilla
- 1995–1996: Valladolid
- 1996: Osasuna
- 1997–1999: Extremadura
- 2000–2001: Tenerife
- 2001–2004: Valencia
- 2004–2010: Liverpool
- 2010: Inter Milan
- 2012–2013: Chelsea (interim)
- 2013–2015: Napoli
- 2015–2016: Real Madrid
- 2016–2019: Newcastle United
- 2019–2021: Dalian Professional
- 2021–2022: Everton
- 2023–2024: Celta Vigo
- 2025–2026: Panathinaikos
- * Club domestic league appearances and goals

Rafael Benítez Maudes (born 16 April 1960) is a Spanish professional football manager and former player.

Benítez joined Real Madrid's coaching staff at the age of 26, going on to work as the under-19 and reserve team coach, and assistant manager for the senior team. He moved away from Real Madrid in 1995, but management spells at Real Valladolid and Osasuna were short-lived and unsuccessful. He guided Segunda División club Extremadura back to La Liga in his first season in the 1997–98 season, but the team was relegated the following season. He left the club, and coached Tenerife in 2000, winning promotion in his only season.

Benítez was appointed coach of Valencia and won La Liga in the 2001–02 and 2003–04 seasons, with the UEFA Cup alongside the latter. After leaving Valencia, Benitez moved to English club Liverpool of the Premier League, guiding the club to victory in the UEFA Champions League in 2005. For the second consecutive season, he was named UEFA Manager of the Year. He also won the FA Cup in 2006 and reached the 2007 Champions League final, but was unable to win the Premier League, with Liverpool's best league performance under Benítez a second-place finish in 2008–09.

After leaving Liverpool in June 2010, Benítez was appointed manager of treble-winning side Inter Milan. Despite attaining silverware with the Supercoppa Italiana and Club World Cup, he was dismissed midway through the 2010–11 season. In November 2012, he was appointed interim manager of Chelsea for the remainder of the season, and he won the 2013 Europa League. He returned to Italy in 2013 to coach Napoli, where he won the Coppa Italia and Supercoppa Italiana. He then left Napoli and became coach of Real Madrid in June 2015 on an initial three-year contract, lasting six months.

Benítez was appointed manager of Newcastle United in March 2016. He was unable to avoid relegation, but earned promotion back to the Premier League by winning the Championship. He left the club in June 2019, and joined Chinese Super League club Dalian Professional. He left the club by mutual consent in January 2021, before taking over as manager at Everton in June. He was dismissed in January 2022, and then managed Celta Vigo in 2023–24. From 2025 to 2026, he managed Panathinaikos.

== Early career ==
Born in Madrid, Benítez played as a midfielder for both Real Madrid Aficionados in the Tercera División and Real Madrid Castilla in the Segunda División. He also enrolled as a student at INEF, the sports faculty at the Universidad Politécnica de Madrid; in 1982, he obtained a degree in physical education.

In 1979, Benítez was selected to play for the Spain Youth U-19s at the World Student Games in Mexico City, and he scored a penalty in the opening game, a 10–0 win against Cuba. In the next game, a 0–0 draw against Canada, he was injured in a hard tackle. The injury saw him sidelined for a year, and hampered his chances of becoming a major player. In 1981, Benítez joined Tercera División side Parla. Initially, he joined Parla on loan, but eventually signed for them permanently and helped them gain promotion to Segunda División B. He also played a further three games for the Spain Universities XI. In 1985, he signed for Segunda División B club Linares and under Enrique Mateos, he served as a player/coach. Further injury problems saw him miss almost the entire 1985–86 season, and he subsequently retired as a player.

== Managerial career ==
=== Real Madrid youth coach ===
In 1986, at the age of 26, Benítez returned to Real Madrid to join the club's coaching staff. At the start of the 1986–87 season, he was appointed coach of Real Madrid Castilla. With this team, he won two league titles in 1987 and 1989. He won a third league title with the Real Madrid youth in 1990. Halfway through the 1990–91 season, he succeeded José Antonio Camacho as the coach of Real Madrid's under-19 team. He won the Spain Under-19s Cup in 1991 and 1993, defeating Barcelona in both finals. In 1993, the team completed a double when they also won the national under-19 league. While at Real, Benítez also gained his coaching certificate in 1989 – and in the summer of 1990, taught at a football camp at the University of California, Davis.

During the 1992–93 season, Benítez also worked as an assistant coach to Mariano García Remón at Real Madrid B. After his success with the U19s, Benítez then succeeded García Remón at the start of the 1993–94 season. Real Madrid B were then playing in the Segunda División, and on 4 September 1993, he made his debut as a Segunda División manager with a 3–1 over Hércules. In March 1994, he became an assistant to Vicente del Bosque with the senior Real Madrid team, before returning to coach Real Madrid B for the 1994–95 season.

=== Early coaching ===
Benítez was manager of Real Valladolid for the 1995–96 season, but was dismissed after only two wins in 23 games, with the club bottom of La Liga. During the 1996–97 season, he took charge at Osasuna in the Segunda División, but after only nine games and one win, he was dismissed. He did, however, meet the fitness instructor Pako Ayestarán at the club, and went on to form a partnership with him at several clubs for the next decade. In 1997, he joined another Segunda División side, Extremadura, and this time led them to promotion, finishing second in the table behind Alavés, after winning 23 out of 42 games. Extremadura only survived one season in La Liga, and were relegated in 1999, after finishing 17th and losing a play-off to Rayo Vallecano.

Benítez subsequently resigned at Extremadura, and took a year off from football to study in England and Italy. He also worked as a commentator/analyst for Eurosport, Marca, El Mundo and local Madrid TV. In 2000, he was appointed manager of Tenerife of the Segunda División, and with a team that included Mista, Curro Torres and Luis García, he gained promotion to La Liga by finishing third in the league behind Sevilla and Real Betis.

=== Valencia ===
In 2001, Benítez was appointed coach of Valencia, replacing Argentine Héctor Cúper. Cúper had led the club to two consecutive UEFA Champions League finals (both of which they lost), and departed to join Italian side Inter Milan. Valencia had previously approached Javier Irureta, Mané and Luis Aragonés, and had been turned down by all three. However, club director Javier Subirats recognised the potential of Benítez, and campaigned for his appointment. According to Santiago Cañizares, the squad was initially surprised, but they were immediately won over by his modesty as he presented himself as quoted: "You come from the Champions League final and I come from Segunda División, but humbly I think I have tools to make you improve". Shortly after his signing was announced in June 2001, Valencia president Pedro Cortes said that, "we believe he's the ideal coach. He's a professional who is highly qualified to take charge of the sort of team we want — young, aggressive and with a winning attitude." Benitez signed a two-year deal, with an annual salary of €450,000, compared to the €1.2 million Cúper had earnt the previous season.

Valencia fans also were soon won over by Benítez, after he introduced a more attacking style of play than his predecessor. He also brought in both Mista from his former club and Francisco Rufete from Málaga, with Mista going on to become top goalscorer for Valencia, with 19 goals in the 2003–04 season. In 2002, these tactics saw Benítez lead Valencia to their first La Liga title in 31 years, winning it by a seven-point margin over second-placed Deportivo La Coruña.

In 2002–03, Valencia finished 18 points behind champions Real Madrid, and missed out on the top four by a single point. The season also saw Benítez make his debut in the Champions League, where his side reached the quarter-finals, losing to Inter Milan.

In the 2003–04 season, Valencia won La Liga with three games to spare, and beat Marseille 2–0 in the UEFA Cup final. Despite this success, Benítez fell out with Jesús García Pitarch, the club's director of football, over control of new signings, and the club's failure to reinforce the squad with the players he wanted. He said: "I was hoping for a sofa [a defender] and they've brought me a lamp [Fabián Canobbio]," in reference to the positions he wanted to be strengthened. These differences of opinion saw Benítez resign as Valencia coach on 1 June 2004.

=== Liverpool ===
On 16 June 2004, Benítez was appointed manager of Liverpool, replacing Gérard Houllier, becoming the first Spaniard to manage in the Premier League. On his arrival he stated: "It is like a dream to be here. I am very, very proud to be joining one of the most important clubs in the world in one of the best leagues in the world – and I want to win."

==== 2004–06: Early successes ====
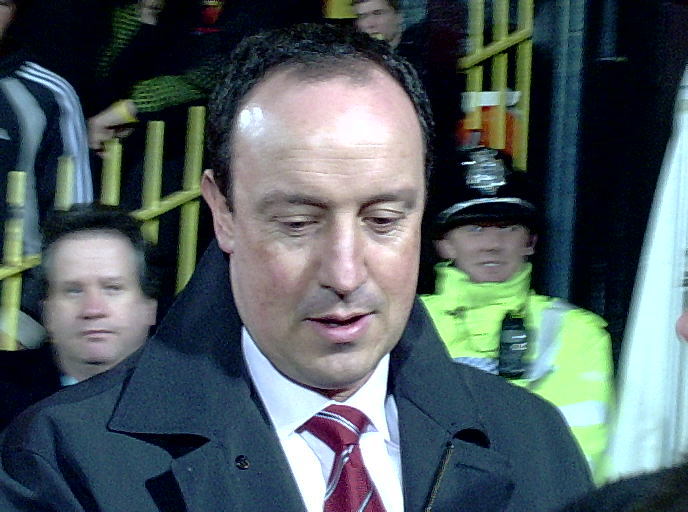
Benítez managing Liverpool in 2005, his first season at the club

One of Benítez's first tasks at Liverpool was to convince club captain Steven Gerrard not to move to Chelsea. He was unable, however, to convince Michael Owen to extend his contract; he was subsequently sold to Real Madrid. Later in the summer transfer window, Benítez signed several players from La Liga, most notably Luis García and Xabi Alonso.

During his first season, Benítez was unable to improve Liverpool's form in the Premier League. Key players missed much of the season through injury, and Liverpool failed to challenge Chelsea and Arsenal for the league title, finishing fifth. Benítez, however, did reach his first English domestic cup final, losing the League Cup final against Chelsea at the Millennium Stadium 3–2 after extra time.

"Once you reached that euphoria… that satisfaction and happiness, you enjoy the moment and see everything around you, all the red with so many people with so much passion. After so many years, that’s something wonderful that stays in your memory forever".

— Benítez speaking in 2020 on winning the 2005 Champions League final.

In the Champions League, Liverpool were minutes away from going out of the competition in the group stages. However, an 87th-minute goal by Steven Gerrard defeated Olympiacos 3–1, and saw the club progress to the last 16 on head-to-head difference. After defeating Bayer Leverkusen and Juventus, Liverpool faced Chelsea in the semi-final. A controversial early goal in the second leg from Luis García saw Liverpool win 1–0 on aggregate and reach the final against AC Milan.

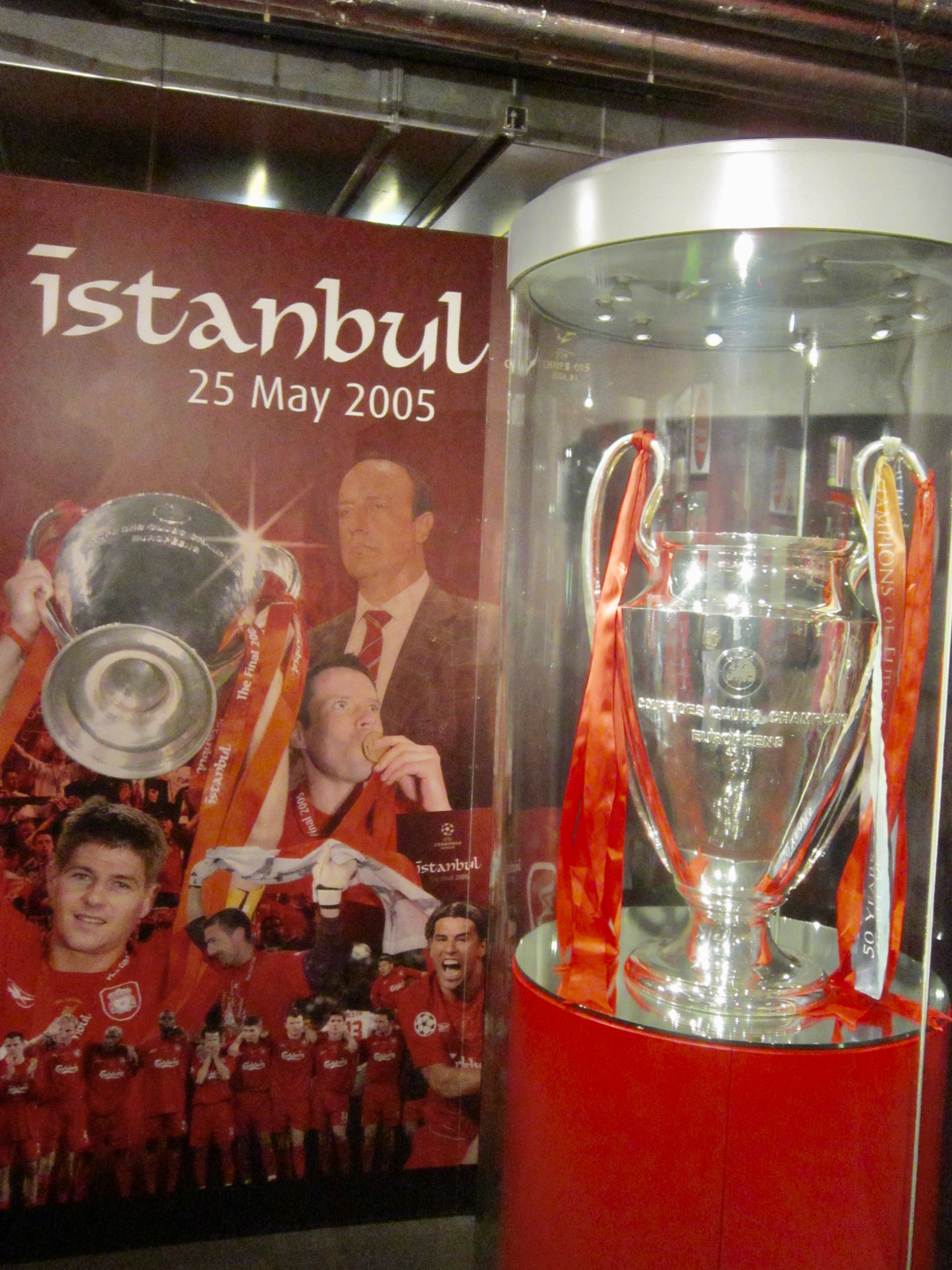
Image of Benítez (top right) in the Liverpool F.C. museum along with the Champions League trophy

In the final, dubbed the Miracle of Istanbul, Liverpool came from 3–0 down at half time to level the score at 3–3 in the space of six minutes, eventually winning 3–2 on penalties after saves from goalkeeper Jerzy Dudek. Benítez's calm, methodical approach at half time was said to give the players the belief they could pull off an improbable comeback, and win Liverpool an historic fifth European Cup. In doing so, Benítez became the third manager in history (after Bob Paisley and José Mourinho) to win the UEFA Cup and UEFA Champions League in successive seasons, and the second Liverpool manager (after Joe Fagan) ever to win the UEFA Champions League/European Cup in his first season in charge.

Dudek's performance in the final was not enough for him to stay as first-choice goalkeeper, as newly signed Pepe Reina replaced him in from the start of the 2005–06 season. Benítez also discarded Vladimír Šmicer and Igor Bišćan, who played key roles in the European success, and sold Josemi and Antonio Núñez, two of his first signings in English football, after they failed to establish themselves. The likes of Peter Crouch, Mohamed Sissoko, Daniel Agger, as well as former Liverpool player Robbie Fowler, were brought in to strengthen the side.

Benítez's signings helped the club's Premier League form improve considerably. Liverpool finished third in the league, missing out on second place by one point. Liverpool also won the FA Cup, beating both Manchester United and Chelsea, as well as a 5–3 win against Luton Town in the third round, on the way to the final against West Ham United. They won a penalty shoot-out, following a 3–3 draw. Liverpool came from 2–0 down, and were losing 3–2 in stoppage time, when Steven Gerrard scored a late equaliser. This time, Pepe Reina saved three penalties during the shoot-out to secure the silverware.

==== 2006–08 Confrontation with new owners ====
Following Benítez's early success, the English media were predicting Liverpool would challenge Chelsea for the 2006–07 Premier League title after Benítez addressed Liverpool's perceived weaknesses in the transfer window, a belief reaffirmed after his side won the Community Shield with a 2–1 victory over Chelsea. A title challenge, however, became unlikely early in the season, with Liverpool's poor form away from Anfield leading to speculation Benítez's tenure at Liverpool was short-lived, with his agent quoted as saying Benítez would consider offers to manage in Italy. Benítez swiftly issued a statement through the club's website, re-affirming his desire to remain with Liverpool for the long-term.

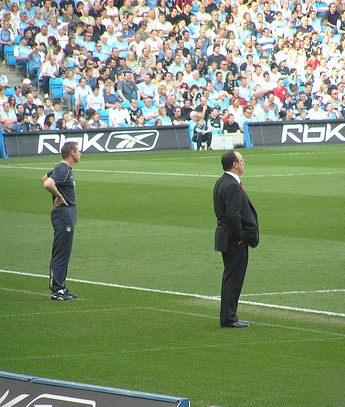
Benítez (right) in April 2007, his third season in charge of Liverpool

Supporters and manager joined to welcome new owners George Gillett and Tom Hicks, with the hope the new owners would bring funding for new players and a new stadium. Gillett declared himself delighted with the manager of his new investment, as Benítez overcame his domestic difficulties to lead Liverpool to another Champions League final. After Liverpool again defeated Chelsea in the semi-final, this time on penalties, Gillett stated, "Rafa has been tremendous ... We knew of him but I don't think we realized how good he was, and not just as a coach. Not only was he a brilliant coach but he is a very sharp, savvy businessman. He knows what he wants and how to get it. The more we have seen of him the more impressed we have become." Benítez did not reciprocate his owner's kind words, demanding that his club's new owners back him in the transfer market in order for Liverpool to progress following his side's 2–1 loss to Milan in the final. It was reported Benítez did not feel he had the complete support of the new owners, a thought that was compounded by Liverpool's initial lack of activity in the transfer window, although the club played these rumours down.

Benítez's spending was, eventually, significant, breaking Liverpool's transfer record when signing Spanish striker Fernando Torres from Atlético Madrid, as well as signing Ryan Babel, Yossi Benayoun, Lucas Leiva and Andriy Voronin. Among those Benítez sold was Craig Bellamy, who was notably phased out of the first team, following an altercation with John Arne Riise in the buildup to Liverpool's remarkable victory over Barcelona in the Camp Nou en route to the Champions League final.

Liverpool made a good start to the 2007–08 season, topping the Premier League table for the first time under Benítez, after a comprehensive 6–0 win over Derby County. Despite this, poor results in the Champions League and a disagreement over future transfers led to a public falling-out with the club's owners, which played out in the media at the end of November. It was suggested that Benítez's position was now under serious threat. The resulting coverage resulted in a show of support by fans in support of Benítez which culminated in a fans' march in support of Benítez ahead of the critical Champions League home tie with Porto, which they won 4–1. It later emerged that Jürgen Klinsmann had been offered Benítez's job before eventually accepting the post of Bayern Munich manager. Such a revelation damaged Benítez's relations with the Americans, with constant rumours linking the Spaniard with a move back to Real Madrid. Benítez, however, said that his future was at Liverpool and appointed Sammy Lee as his new assistant to replace his long-time right-hand man, Pako Ayestarán, who quit after a reported disagreement.

Benítez was unable to win any trophies as Liverpool's domestic campaign faltered in the middle of the season – including a shock FA Cup exit at home to Barnsley, and losing to Chelsea in the Champions League semi-finals. Despite the lack of silverware, the main talking points were off the pitch, with Benítez in the middle of a power struggle with the Liverpool board.

==== 2008–09: League runner-up ====
In a sign of the increasingly strained relationship between the Liverpool manager and his board, Benítez was reportedly close to quitting Liverpool before the 2008–09 season over the board's failure to back him in his bid to purchase Gareth Barry from Aston Villa. Benítez had reportedly intended to sell Xabi Alonso to fund the purchase of Barry, but Liverpool CEO Rick Parry was reported to have prioritised signing Robbie Keane over Barry, causing tension when Barry did not arrive. Striker Keane was later re-sold back to Tottenham Hotspur in the January transfer window, with some analysts claiming he was a "pawn in a power struggle" between Benítez and the club's owners. This off-field turmoil was in contrast to Liverpool's start to the 2008–09 season in the Premier League, including Benítez' first ever league win against Manchester United at Anfield on 13 September and ending Chelsea's 86-match unbeaten run in the league at Stamford Bridge. Liverpool finished the calendar year top of the Premier League for the first time since 1996.

However, Liverpool's poor results in the New Year led to a sharper focus on Benítez, who had missed Liverpool's draw at Arsenal in December due to an operation to remove kidney stones. An infamous attack on Manchester United manager Sir Alex Ferguson in the media led some pundits and opposition supporters to suggest Benítez was "cracking up" under the pressure of a title bid. Benítez still appeared to be at odds with Liverpool's owners, publicly turning down a contract extension and demanding more control over transfers. At one point, rumours of Benítez quitting or being dismissed became so great that bookmakers had to suspend betting on the subject.

Nevertheless, on 18 March 2009, shortly after registering a 4–0 victory over Real Madrid and 4–1 victory over Manchester United, Benítez signed a new five-year deal with the club. Benítez said, "My heart is with Liverpool, so I'm delighted to sign this new deal, I love the club, the fans and the city and with a club and supporters like this, I could never say no to staying." With ten wins in their last 11 games, Liverpool finished second in the league for the first time under Benítez, four points off champions Manchester United, playing an attractive brand of attacking football at odds with the side that struggled through the winter months.

==== 2009–10: Decline and dismissal ====
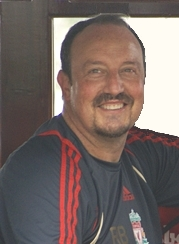
Benítez during Liverpool's Asia Tour in 2009

Prior to Benítez's final season at Liverpool, Xabi Alonso, one of the key members of Benítez's squad, was sold to Real Madrid following a lengthy pursuit in a deal reportedly worth £30 million. Alonso said that Benítez's attempts to sell him the previous summer were a deciding factor in his move. Alonso was immediately replaced in the squad by Italian midfielder Alberto Aquilani, signed from Roma for £17 million, who was recovering from a long-term injury. Also added was England defender Glen Johnson for a £17.5 million fee. A "sell to buy" policy enforced by the ownership due to increasing debt, combined with Alonso's departure, prompted discontent amongst considerable sections of the club's fanbase who believed Benítez was not being backed sufficiently in the transfer market. Benítez's decision to sell Alonso and replace him in the side with Lucas Leiva, in addition to Aquilani having arrived at the club injured, was called into question as Liverpool's title campaign began with two defeats in the first three games. Benítez defended his decisions, arguing Liverpool's slow start was due to key players such as Steven Gerrard being below par.

Liverpool's worst run in 22 years combined with an exit from the Champions League at the group stages led to the first major vocal criticism of Benítez by Liverpool fans. It was suggested that this Liverpool team was missing Benítez's characteristic defensive rigidity despite the fact that only Manchester United and Chelsea conceded fewer goals than Liverpool, and lacked the necessary depth to cope with injuries to key players such as Gerrard and Fernando Torres while Benítez's decision making was called into question. The club subsequently exited the UEFA Europa League at the hands of Atlético Madrid.

Benítez left the club "by mutual consent" on 3 June 2010 with a reported £6 million pay-off; the media speculated that this was because the team had finished seventh in the Premier League, missing out on the Champions League, and suffered poor results, including the defeat by Wigan Athletic. Shortly after his departure from Anfield, Benítez made a £96,000 donation to the Hillsborough Family Support Group.

=== Inter Milan ===
On 10 June 2010, and only a few days after leaving Liverpool, Benítez agreed a deal to become the new head coach of Serie A and reigning European champions Inter Milan, taking over from José Mourinho, who had left to manage Real Madrid. On 15 June 2010, Benítez was presented to the Italian media for the first time, after signing a two-year deal. On 21 August 2010, Benítez won his first trophy as manager, the Italian Super Cup, after they defeated Roma 3–1. On 27 August 2010 in Monaco, Inter lost to Atlético Madrid in the 2010 UEFA Super Cup. Benítez's first Serie A game in charge was on 31 August 2010 in a 0–0 draw away to Bologna at the Stadio Renato Dall'Ara. His first league win as manager came on 11 September 2010, a 2–1 win against Udinese at the San Siro.

By December 2010, Inter had slumped to sixth in Serie A, 13 points adrift of the top (though with two games in hand at the time), having suffered consecutive defeats against arch rivals Milan (which ended a 46 match unbeaten home record), Chievo and Lazio, as well as losing at Tottenham Hotspur in the Champions League, leading to speculation that Benítez's position was under threat. Despite criticism, Benítez guided Inter to win the FIFA Club World Cup in December 2010. Buoyed by the Club World Cup victory, he told Inter to back him with new signings, or consider whether they wanted to keep him as coach, despite the side having won the treble only a few months earlier. Benítez's demands were dismissed out of hand by the ownership, with Massimo Moratti refusing to comment on Benítez's continued employment by the club. On 23 December 2010, just five days after bringing Inter to triumph, Benítez was dismissed.

=== Chelsea ===
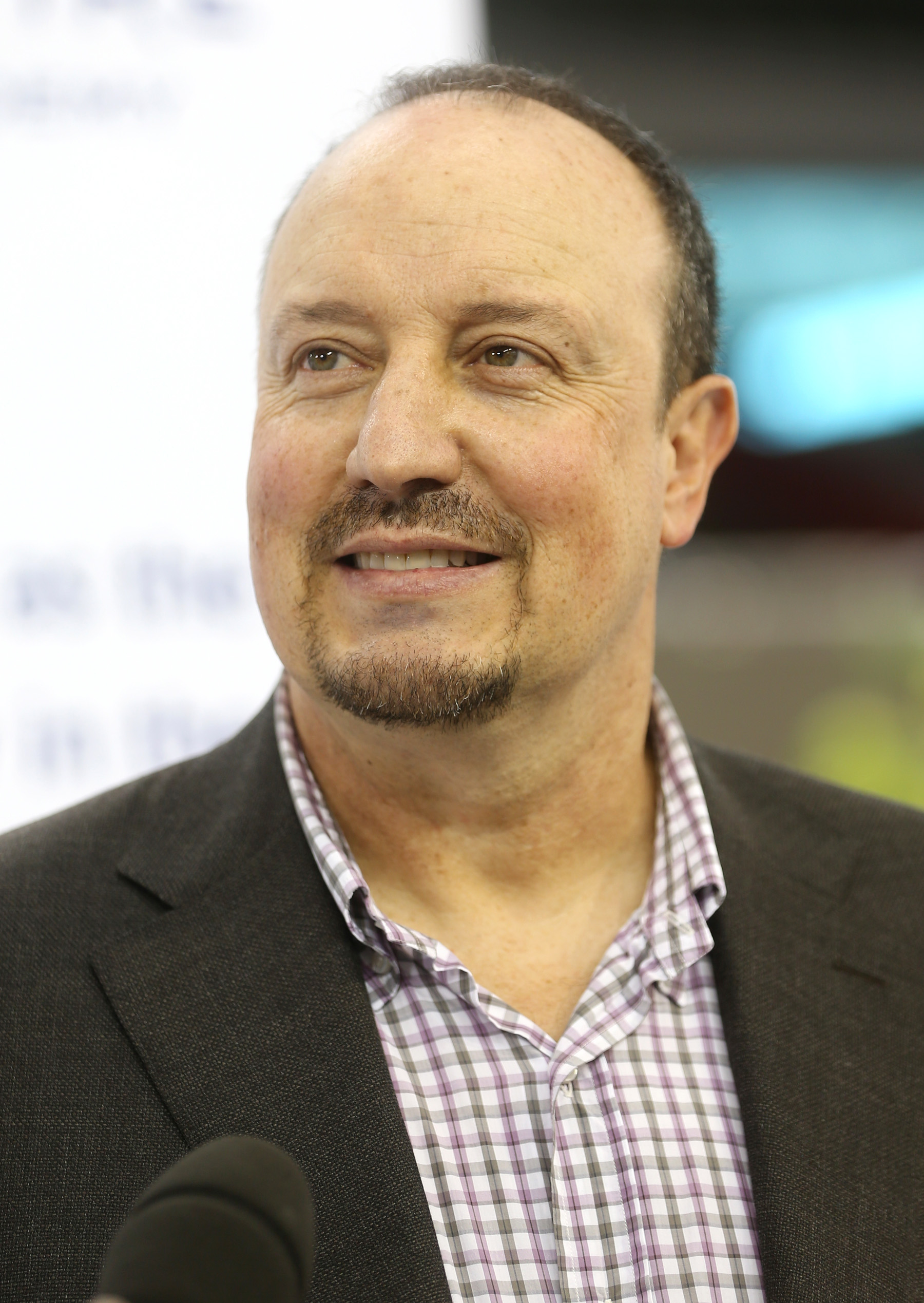
Benítez with Chelsea in 2012

On 21 November 2012, following the dismissal of Roberto Di Matteo, Chelsea appointed Benítez as the interim first-team manager until the end of the 2012–13 season. He was unveiled as the new Chelsea manager at a press conference on 22 November 2012. He appointed Boudewijn Zenden as his new assistant manager at Chelsea on the same day.

The appointment was initially unpopular, with many Chelsea fans due to Benítez' association with Liverpool and comments he had previously made about Chelsea, and he received a "fiercely hostile reception" as he was introduced at his first home game, a 0–0 draw with Manchester City on 25 November 2012. This was followed by a 0–0 draw at home to Fulham and a 3–1 loss to West Ham. On 5 December 2012, Benítez recorded his first win as Chelsea manager, a 6–1 victory at home to Nordsjælland in the Champions League. Despite this win, Chelsea failed to progress beyond the group stage of the competition. This was followed by a 3–1 away victory to Sunderland, with Benítez presiding over his first league win as Chelsea manager.

At the FIFA Club World Cup in December 2012, Chelsea defeated Monterrey 3–1 to reach the final, where they were beaten 1–0 by Brazilian side Corinthians. Chelsea progressed to the League Cup semi-finals with a 5–1 win over Leeds United at Elland Road, and then recorded an 8–0 win over Aston Villa, equalling their record top-flight victory. They subsequently lost 1–0 at home to 20th-placed Queens Park Rangers in the Premier League, and were knocked out of the League Cup semi-finals by underdogs Swansea City 2–0 on aggregate.

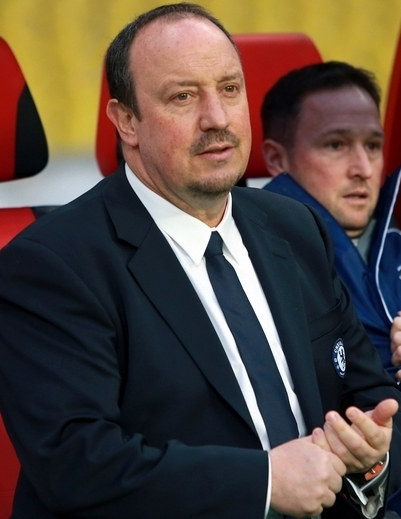
Benítez managing Chelsea in 2013

On 27 February 2013, following a 2–0 win at Middlesbrough in the FA Cup fifth-round, Benítez heavily criticised the Chelsea board for giving him the title of "interim manager" and the Chelsea fans for their protests against him. He also confirmed that he would be leaving the club at the end of the season. He described his relationship with Chelsea owner Roman Abramovich as "excellent" and expressed his desire to remain as Chelsea manager until the end of the season. Results continued to be mixed, and at one point, Chelsea found themselves 16 points behind league leaders Manchester United, having been just four behind when Benítez was appointed. Chelsea reached the semi-finals of the FA Cup, losing 2–1 to Manchester City at Wembley Stadium, and also progressed to the final of the UEFA Europa League. In the penultimate league game of the season, Chelsea won 2–1 away to Aston Villa, a game in which Frank Lampard set the all-time scoring record at Chelsea. The win secured a top-four Premier League finish, and with it a place in the following season's Champions League.

In the Europa League final against Benfica on 15 May, Chelsea won 2–1. This made Benítez only the second manager after Giovanni Trapattoni to have won the UEFA Cup/Europa League with two different teams, and Chelsea became the fourth club overall and first in Britain to have won all three major European trophies. Defender David Luiz credited Benítez with making critical changes at half time, saying, "He changed some of our positions in the second half. That's why we played better and won the title. He spoke a lot to us to change the intensity." On the winning goal scored by Branislav Ivanović, Juan Mata said, "Rafa told us we had to aim to the far post, because it was Artur's weakest place. I just tried to put the ball there and Ivanovic did the rest."

On 19 May, in his final competitive game as Chelsea manager, Benítez managed the team to a 2–1 home win over Everton, ensuring a third-place finish in the Premier League, and a direct spot in the following season's Champions League group stage. Benitez did not take part in the lap of honour after the match, but many fans showed their appreciation for his efforts during the season, a notable contrast to the hostile reception he received before.

=== Napoli ===
On 27 May 2013, it was announced that Benítez had signed for Napoli, whose previous manager Walter Mazzarri had resigned. Benítez agreed a two-year contract after meeting club president Aurelio De Laurentiis in London.

In his first season in charge, Benítez guided the club to victory in the Coppa Italia, defeating Fiorentina 3–1 in the final, and into the last 16 of the Europa League, exiting after a 3–2 aggregate defeat to Porto. Napoli finished third in Serie A in 2013–14 to qualify for the next season's Champions League. They lost 4–2 on aggregate to Athletic Bilbao in the qualifying stages, thus entering the Europa League.

Benítez announced that he would resign at the end of the 2014–15 season. His final match was a 4–2 defeat to Lazio, who took the final place in the Champions League at Napoli's expense.

=== Real Madrid ===
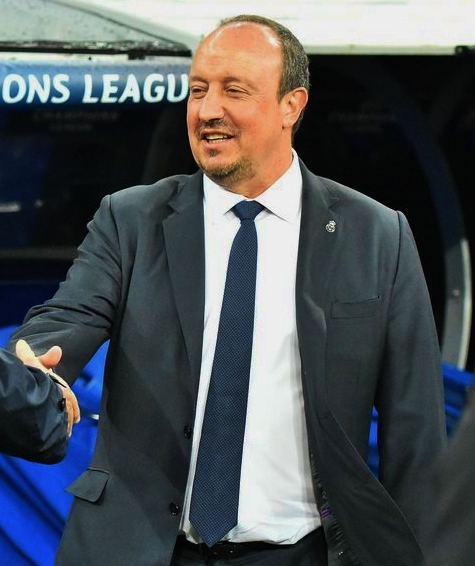
Benítez shaking hands before a UEFA Champions League group stage match against Shakhtar Donetsk

On 3 June 2015, Benítez was confirmed as the new Real Madrid manager, signing a three-year contract. Real Madrid remained unbeaten in the league, until a 3–2 loss at Sevilla in the eleventh matchday. This was followed by a 4–0 home loss in the first Clásico of the season against Barcelona. Madrid later played Cádiz in the Copa del Rey round of 32, winning away 3–1 in the first leg. However, Madrid fielded an ineligible player in the second leg and was ultimately disqualified. Meanwhile, Real topped their UEFA Champions League group with 16 points.

On 4 January 2016, Benítez's contract was terminated following allegations of unpopularity with supporters, displeasure with players and a failure to get good results against top sides. At the time of his dismissal, Real were third in La Liga, four points behind leaders Atlético Madrid and two points behind arch-rivals Barcelona, the latter of whom had a game in hand.

=== Newcastle United ===
On 11 March 2016, Benítez was appointed manager of relegation threatened Newcastle United, signing on an initial three-year deal. He lost his first match in charge, 1–0 away to eventual champions Leicester City on 14 March. He won for the first time in his fifth game on 16 April, 3–0 over Swansea City in the Premier League.

Newcastle ended the season with a six-match unbeaten run, including a 5–1 final day win over third-place Tottenham Hotspur. However, the team was relegated to the Championship due to rivals Sunderland claiming 12 points from their final six fixtures. On 25 May 2016, it was confirmed that Benítez would remain as manager.

In May 2017, Newcastle achieved promotion as champions, and made an immediate return to the Premier League, after one season in the Championship.

On 24 June 2019, Newcastle announced that Benítez would step down as manager upon the expiration of his contract at the end of the month. Mike Ashley criticised Benítez following his departure, stating that Benítez's demands made it impossible for him to remain in charge. However, in an interview with The Athletic in December 2020, Benítez stated he was left no choice but to leave the role, due to disagreements with Ashley, describing him as "a businessman who I don't believe really cares about his team."

Two of the signings made by Benitez (Fabian Schär and Jacob Murphy) went on to play in the 2025 EFL Cup final and become part of the first Newcastle United team to win a major domestic trophy in 70 years.

=== Dalian Professional ===
On 2 July 2019, Benítez was appointed manager of Chinese Super League side Dalian Professional (formerly Dalian Yifang), signing a two-and-a-half-year deal. On 23 January 2021, Benítez left the club by mutual consent, citing concerns over the health and wellbeing of his family due to the COVID-19 pandemic as a reason for his departure.

=== Everton ===
Benítez was appointed manager of Premier League club Everton on a three-year contract on 30 June 2021, replacing Carlo Ancelotti, who left to re-join Real Madrid. Before signing the contract, he was a subject to threats from a group of Everton supporters, who opposed his appointment and who left a banner near his home, reading: "We know where you live. Don't sign." Benitez is only the second person to manage both Liverpool and Everton, since William Edward Barclay in the 1890s.

Under Benitez, Everton enjoyed a winning streak across the Premier League and EFL Cup in their first four games. He won his first league game in charge, beating Southampton 3–1. This win was followed up with a 2–2 draw at Leeds United, a 2–1 win at Huddersfield Town in the EFL Cup and a 2–0 win against Brighton & Hove Albion in the Premier League. Due to this unbeaten run, Benitez was nominated for the Manager of the Month award.

Everton's form declined in the following months, with the club winning only one game (2–1 against Arsenal) between matchdays 7 and 22. After a 2–1 defeat to bottom-placed Norwich City at Carrow Road, Benitez was relieved of his duties on 16 January 2022, after six-and-a-half months in charge, with Everton in 15th place, six points above the relegation zone, having lost nine of their previous thirteen games. With his sacking, Benitez became the fifth Everton manager to lose his job in the previous six years.

=== Celta Vigo ===
On 23 June 2023, Benítez was appointed manager of La Liga club Celta Vigo on a three-year contract, replacing Carlos Carvalhal.

On 12 March 2024, Benítez was sacked after gathering just five wins and 24 points from 28 matches, leaving the club sitting two points from the relegation zone. He had led Celta to the club's Copa del Rey quarter-finals since 2017 in his brief stint in charge, losing 1–2 to Real Sociedad in January. His last game in charge was a 4–0 defeat to Real Madrid.

=== Panathinaikos ===
On 19 October 2025, Benitez became manager of Panathinaikos on a 2.5-year contract. He was sacked on 22 May 2026 by Panathinaikos after finishing 4th in the championship play-offs.

== Relations with other managers ==
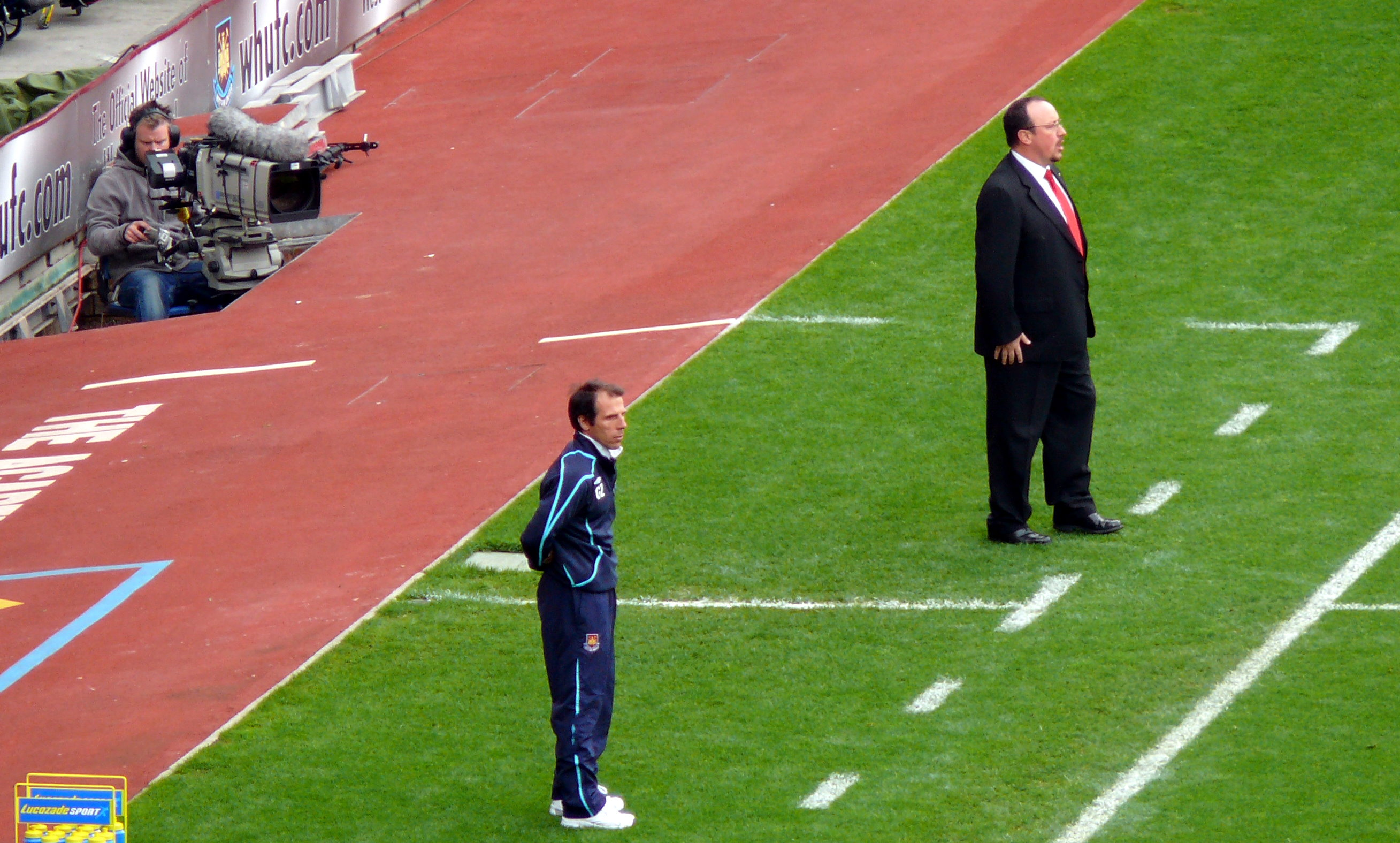
Benítez and West Ham United manager Gianfranco Zola in 2009

Benítez has had confrontations with both José Mourinho (Chelsea manager from 2004 to 2007) and Manchester United's Sir Alex Ferguson during his time in English football. Benítez made a number of suggestions during Mourinho's tenure as manager that Roman Abramovich's money had bought Chelsea's success, and the pair refused to shake hands after some matches (although Mourinho declared the feud to be over after a league game in 2006). When Mourinho exited Chelsea in 2007, Benítez said, "You know my relationship with him, it is better that I do not say anything", declining to comment as Ferguson and Arsenal manager Arsène Wenger had.

On 9 January 2009, Benítez delivered a controversial appraisal of certain aspects of Sir Alex Ferguson's tenure, accusing Ferguson and Manchester United of being nervous because Liverpool were at the top of the league, then accused the Manchester United manager of not being punished for breaking FA rules, suggesting he was "the only manager in the league that cannot be punished for these things", referring to Ferguson not being punished following an FA charge for comments he made about officials Martin Atkinson and Keith Hackett following an FA Cup tie with Portsmouth. In his 2013 autobiography, Ferguson said that "Benitez bought badly and made the feud personal".

Benítez has also had confrontations with Sam Allardyce when he was manager of Newcastle United and Blackburn Rovers. When Allardyce was manager of Newcastle, he suggested Benítez would have been dismissed had Liverpool's European form been as bad as their league form. In a match in April 2009 when Allardyce was manager of Blackburn, he accused Benítez of arrogance over a gesture he made when Fernando Torres scored Liverpool's second goal. Allardyce suggested that Benítez had signalled the game was over despite Liverpool only having a two-goal lead. This view was later supported by Sir Alex Ferguson. Benítez, however, later explained this gesture: he said he had previously told Xabi Alonso to take a short free-kick. This instruction was ignored, which resulted in a goal. Benítez said that he had jokingly signalled to Alonso to ignore his instructions and not that he thought the game was effectively over.

== Management style ==
Benítez developed a reputation in English football as a hard man to please, with former Liverpool captain Steven Gerrard admitting he longed for a "well done" from Benítez after good performances. Benítez's ruthlessness can also be seen in the way he disposed of all but Gerrard and Jamie Carragher from his Champions League winning squad within four seasons, with penalty shoot-out hero Jerzy Dudek made back-up goalkeeper the very season after the European triumph.

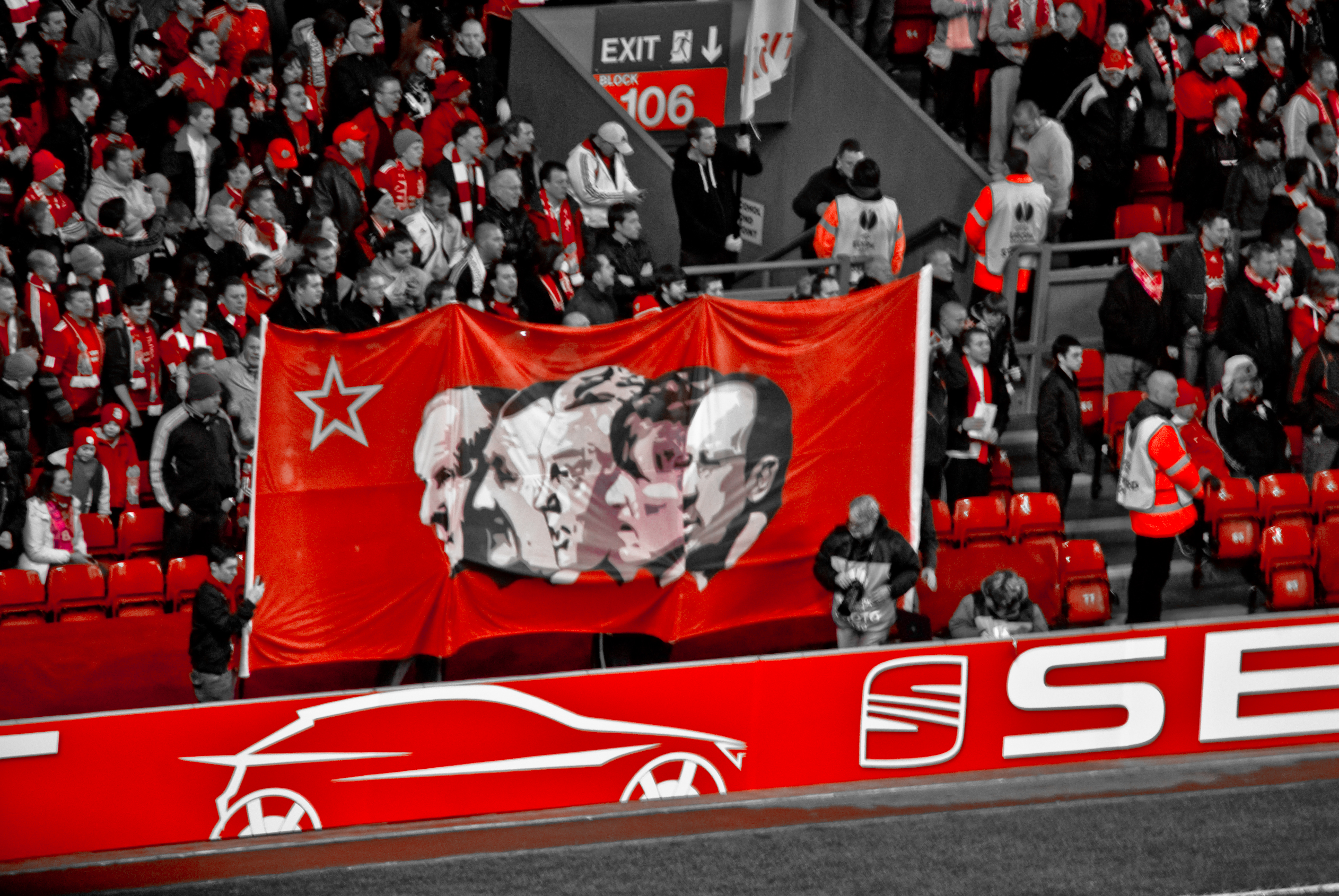
Banner held by fans on the Kop of former Liverpool managers, with Benítez on the far right

Benítez's preferred formation is a 4–2–3–1 which he adopted during his time at Valencia and Liverpool. He was highly regarded for his tactical acumen particularly in European ties, setting his team up to exploit opposition weaknesses. His calm demeanour and tactical changes at half time of the 2005 UEFA Champions League final were said to give players belief they could battle back from 3–0 down, although he had to correct his plans when it was pointed out to him his new formation would require 12 players on the pitch. Benítez often plays key players in unorthodox positions to suit a formation – notably converting both Steven Gerrard (in the 2005–06 season) and Dirk Kuyt into right-wingers. As a right winger/midfielder, Steven Gerrard had the most productive seasons trophy-wise, claiming a Champions League title, and an FA Cup.

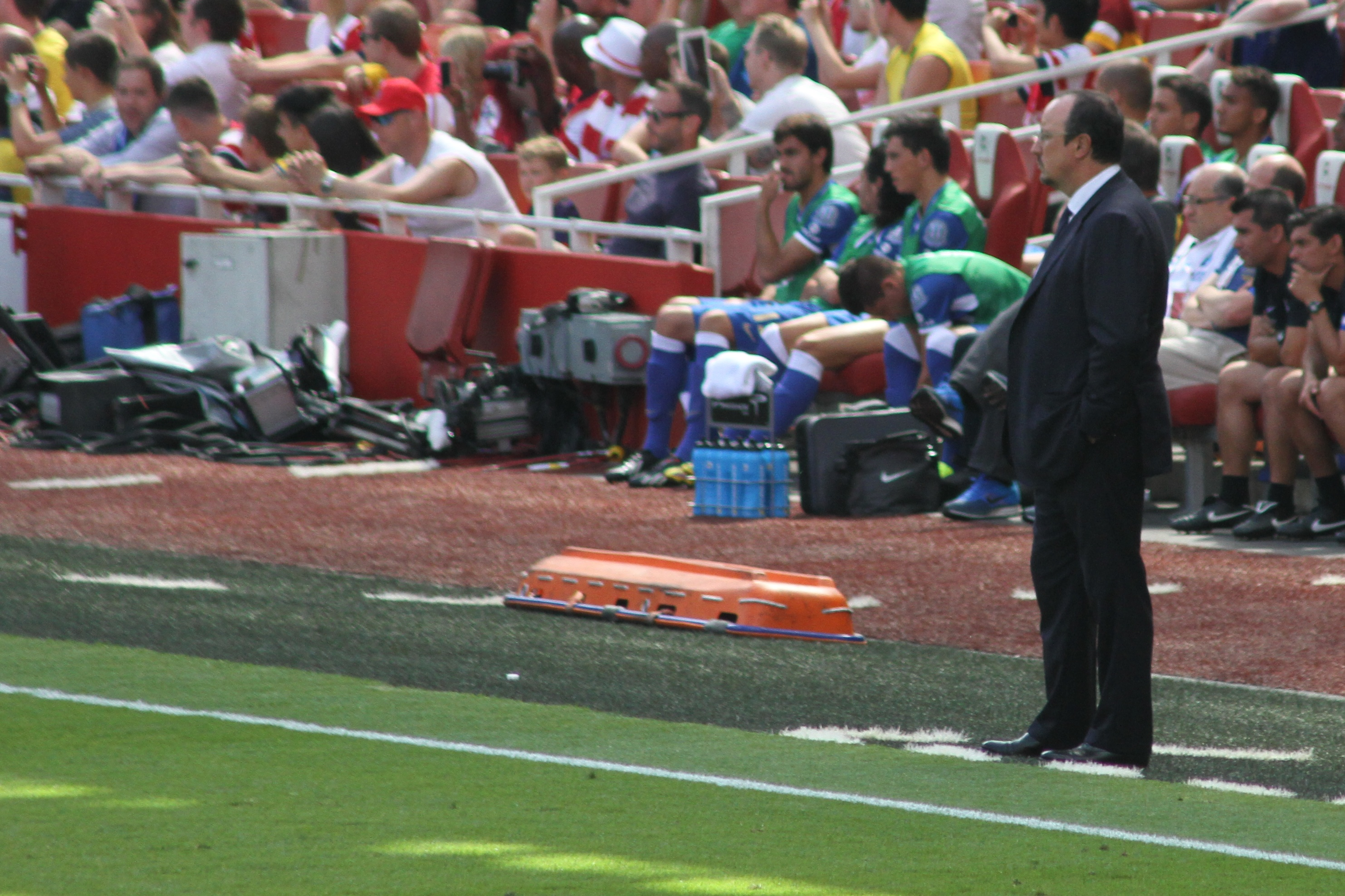
Benítez in 2013

Benítez is a firm believer in squad rotation and zonal marking. Despite heavy criticism from the English press Benítez persisted with the reward of a Champions League and FA Cup triumph in his first two seasons. Benítez argued he needed to rotate his small squad to ensure key players were fit for the latter stages of these knockout competitions.

The tactic of zonal marking was criticised by pundits when Liverpool conceded from set-pieces in spite of the fact that Benítez's squads are usually renowned for their defensive nature and low number of goals scored against them. Benítez stood by his tactic, pointing out that teams who man-mark concede just as many, if not more, goals from set pieces.

Benítez instigated a host of backroom changes at the end of the 2008–09 season to improve the club's youth development, including the appointment of club legend Kenny Dalglish in a senior role at the academy.

== Personal life ==
Benítez's father, Francisco, worked as a hotelier. His mother is Rosario Maudes. Rosario is a big football fan and supported Real Madrid, while his father supported Atlético Madrid. Francisco died in December 2005 while Benítez was in Japan for the FIFA Club World Championship.

Rafael Benítez married Maria Montserrat in 1998. They have two daughters: one who was born in Madrid in 1999 and one who was born in Valencia in 2002. Benítez is fluent in Spanish, English, French and Italian.

== Managerial statistics ==
As of match played 17 May 2026

Managerial record by team and tenure
Team	From	To	Record					Ref.
Team	From	To	P	W	D	L	Win %	Ref.
Real Madrid B	1 July 1993	7 March 1994	27	13	5	9	48.1	
Real Madrid B	1 July 1994	30 June 1995	38	13	13	12	34.2	
Valladolid	3 July 1995	25 January 1996	29	5	10	14	17.2	
Osasuna	1 July 1996	4 November 1996	11	3	4	4	27.3	
Extremadura	1 July 1997	30 June 1999	92	36	26	30	39.1	
Tenerife	1 July 2000	30 June 2001	46	23	11	12	50.0	
Valencia	1 July 2001	1 June 2004	162	88	41	33	54.3	
Liverpool	16 June 2004	3 June 2010	350	194	77	79	55.4	
Inter Milan	10 June 2010	23 December 2010	25	12	6	7	48.0	
Chelsea (interim)	21 November 2012	27 May 2013	48	28	10	10	58.3	
Napoli	27 May 2013	3 June 2015	112	59	28	25	52.7	
Real Madrid	3 June 2015	4 January 2016	25	17	5	3	68.0	
Newcastle United	11 March 2016	30 June 2019	146	62	31	53	42.5	
Dalian Professional	2 July 2019	23 January 2021	38	12	8	18	31.6	
Everton	30 June 2021	16 January 2022	22	7	5	10	31.8	
Celta Vigo	1 July 2023	12 March 2024	33	9	9	15	27.3	
Panathinaikos	24 October 2025	22 May 2026	40	19	11	10	47.5	
Total			1,245	600	301	344	48.2	

== Honours ==
=== Player ===
Parla

- Tercera División: 1981–82

=== Manager ===
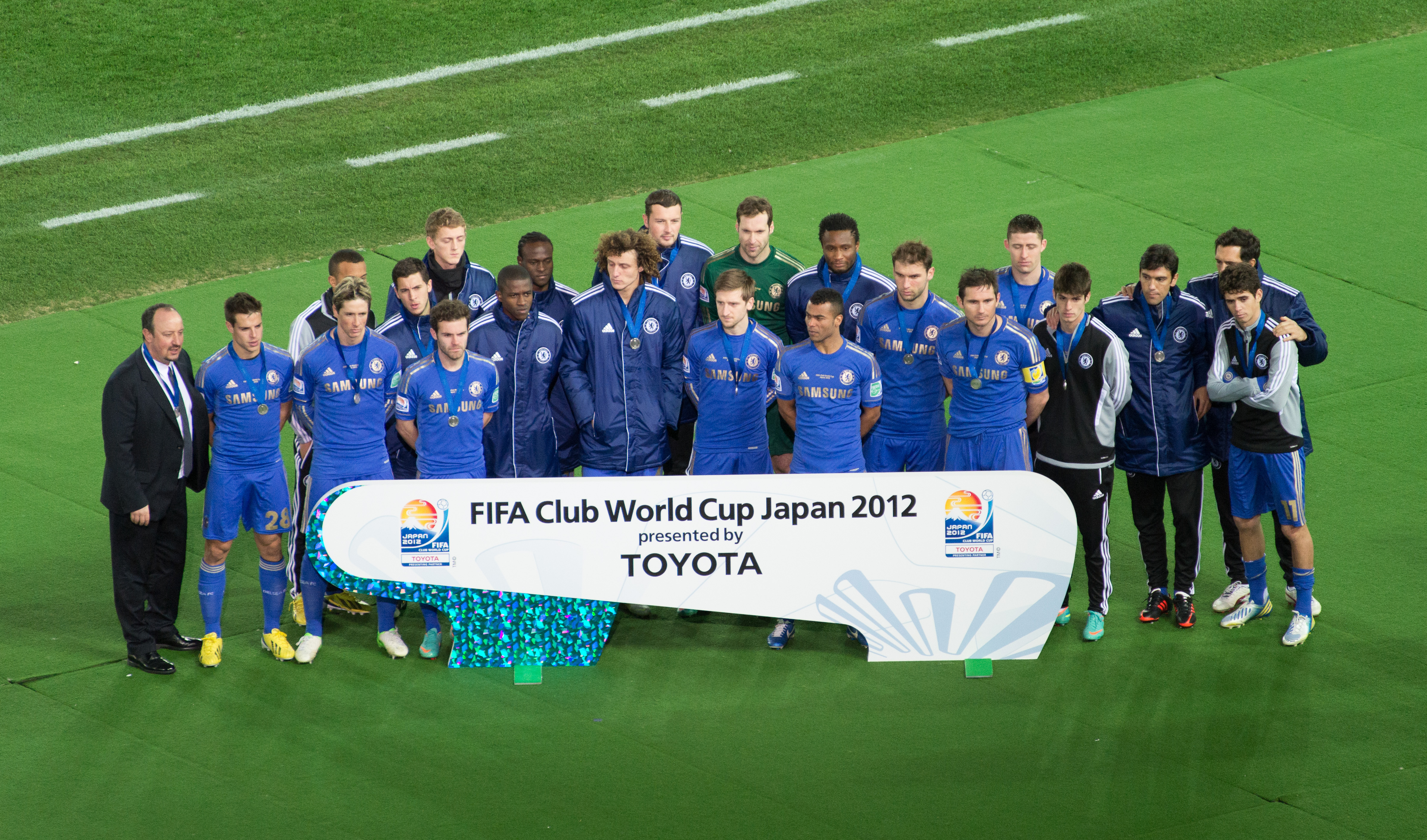
Benítez with Chelsea at the FIFA Club World Cup in 2012

Valencia

- La Liga: 2001–02, 2003–04
- UEFA Cup: 2003–04

Liverpool

- FA Cup: 2005–06
- FA Community Shield: 2006
- UEFA Champions League: 2004–05; runner-up: 2006–07
- UEFA Super Cup: 2005
- Football League Cup runner-up: 2004–05
- FIFA Club World Championship runner-up: 2005

Inter Milan

- Supercoppa Italiana: 2010
- FIFA Club World Cup: 2010

Chelsea

- UEFA Europa League: 2012–13
- FIFA Club World Cup runner-up: 2012

Napoli

- Coppa Italia: 2013–14
- Supercoppa Italiana: 2014

Newcastle United

- EFL Championship: 2016–17

Individual

- La Liga Best Coach: 2002
- UEFA Manager of the Year: 2003–04, 2004–05
- LMA Special Merit Award: 2006
- Premier League Manager of the Month: November 2005, December 2005, January 2007, October 2008, March 2009, April 2013, November 2018
- EFL Championship Manager of the Month: October 2016

== See also ==
- List of European Cup and UEFA Champions League winning managers
- List of UEFA Cup and Europa League winning managers
- List of football managers with the most matches
