= Jesús García Pitarch =

Spanish retired footballer (born 1963)

Personal information
- Full name: Jesús Vicente García Pitarch Marco
- Date of birth: 14 November 1963 (age 62)
- Place of birth: La Pobla, Spain
- Height: 1.72 m (5 ft 8 in)
- Position: Winger

Youth career
- Atlètic Vallbonense
- Valencia

Senior career*
Years	Team	Apps	(Gls)
1982–1983	Mestalla		
1983–1985	Valencia	37	(9)
1983–1984	→ Gandía (loan)		
1985–1987	Español	30	(6)
1988–1990	Figueres	48	(10)
1990–1991	Orihuela Deportiva	35	(22)
1991–1993	Logroñés	53	(6)
1993–1994	Mérida	28	(13)
1994–1996	Villarreal	67	(14)
1996–1997	Murcia	21	(4)
Total		319	(84)

International career
1984–1985	Spain U21	5	(0)
1984	Spain amateur	1	(1)
- * Club domestic league appearances and goals

Jesús Vicente García Pitarch Marco (born 14 November 1963) is a Spanish retired footballer who played as a left winger.

== Playing career ==
Also known as Suso in his playing days, García Pitarch was born in La Pobla de Vallbona, Valencian Community, and played 120 La Liga games over the course of six seasons (21 goals), spending two apiece with local Valencia, Español and Logroñés. He made his debut in the competition on 8 January 1984 in a 0–3 home loss against Sporting de Gijón where he featured 16 minutes, and finished his first season with the Che with 16 games and six goals.

Whilst with Catalonia's Español, García Pitarch missed the entire 1986–87 campaign due to a bout of glomerulonephritis. He went on to recover fully and, in Segunda División, represented Figueres, Orihuela Deportiva (scoring a career-best 22 goals in 1990–91 but still suffering team relegation, due to irregularities), Mérida and Villarreal.

== Post-playing career ==
García Pitarch majored in law in 1987, opening a firm in his hometown. After being in charge of the club's academy, he worked as a director of football with Valencia, replacing Javier Subirats and remaining in office until June 2004 – initially being fired in December of the previous year – leaving as manager Rafael Benítez.

During five seasons, García Pitarch worked in the same capacity at Atlético Madrid, being responsible for signing the likes of Diego Forlán and José Antonio Reyes. On 4 July 2012, he was elected president of Hércules in the second division, also being the main decider in the football department.

García Pitarch left the Estadio José Rico Pérez after just one year, going on to work as director of football with Real Zaragoza, Baniyas Club (United Arab Emirates) and Valencia. He left his role with the latter club on 7 January 2017.

== Aston Villa ==
On 9 October 2018, García Pitarch was appointed as sporting director of Aston Villa, where his key duties included player recruitment. On 27 July 2020, he was dismissed from this role after chief executive Christian Purslow carried out a "long-term strategic review of how the club can improve its recruitment".
