= Project Islero =

Spanish nuclear weapons program (1963–1987)

- Proyecto Islero
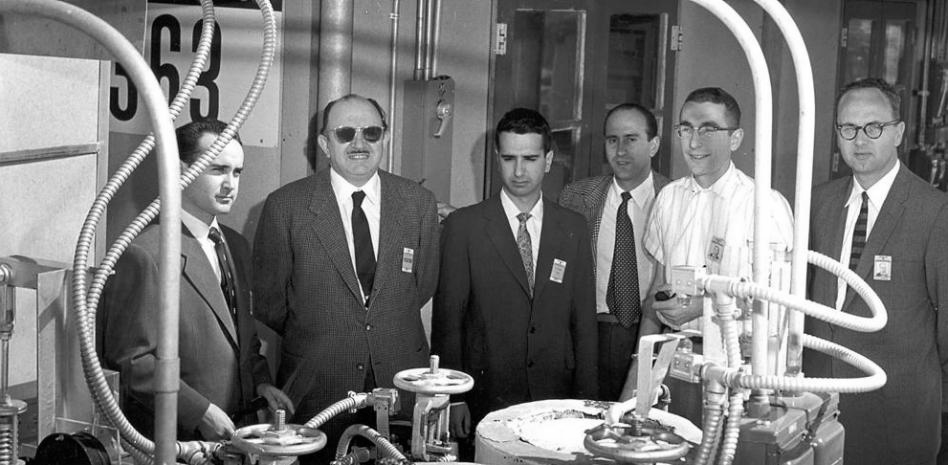
- José María Otero de Navascués (second from left) and Guillermo Velarde, 27 December 1958
- Active: 1963–1981
- Disbanded: 1987
- Country: Spain
- Branch: Defence High Command
- Type: Nuclear Weapons Project
- Headquarters: Vandellós, Tarragona

Commanders
- Notable commanders: Luis Carrero Blanco; Agustín Muñoz Grandes; Guillermo Velarde; Manuel Díez-Alegría

Project Islero was an attempted Spanish nuclear program. Named after Islero, the bull which felled the famous bullfighter Manolete, the program was created by Generals Agustín Muñoz Grandes and Guillermo Velarde in 1963. Although Spain possessed the second largest uranium deposits in the world at the time, it was not until the Palomares Incident of 1966 that Spain would focus on plutonium-239 implosion-type designs. Yet, in 1966, Franco paused the military research, shifting efforts to nuclear reactor construction and plutonium production. However, the program was resumed in 1971, with help from France to refine the material and fund the nuclear facilities.

Lasting from the middle stages of Francisco Franco's rule into the beginning of the democratic transition, the project was prematurely cancelled due to American pressures in 1981, although it only formally ended in 1987 under Felipe González. Although the project never developed a nuclear weapon, the country possessed the capabilities to both design and manufacture the necessary components, with the Spanish Foreign Minister, José María de Areilza, declaring in 1976 that Spain would be able to manufacture the bomb "in seven or eight years if we set our minds to it."

== Background ==
=== The JIA and JEN ===
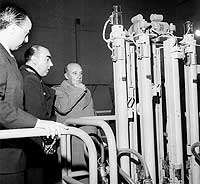
Francisco Franco and Luis Carrero Blanco inaugurating the Juan Vigón National Nuclear Energy Center on 27 December 1958.

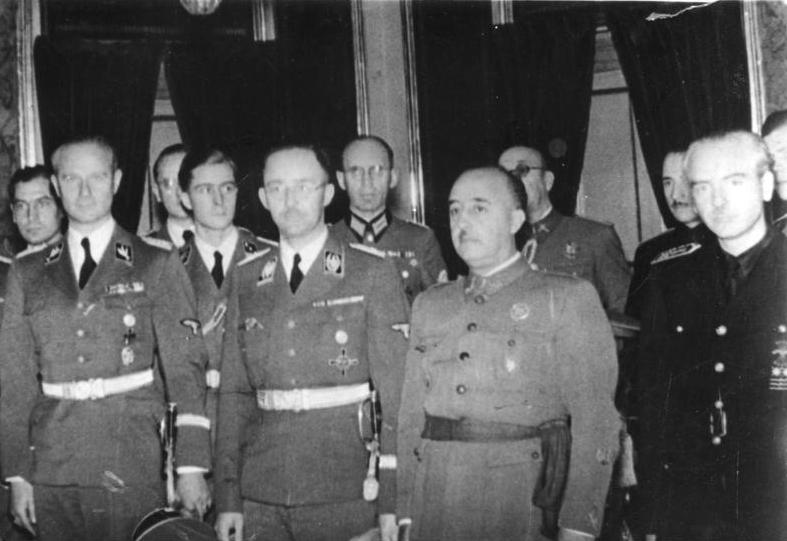
Heinrich Himmler, Francisco Franco, and Ramón Serrano Suñer in Madrid on 25 October 1940.

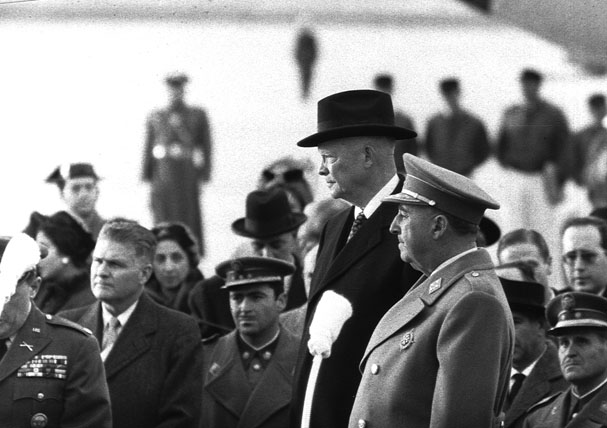
Francisco Franco and Dwight D. Eisenhower in Madrid on 22 December 1959.

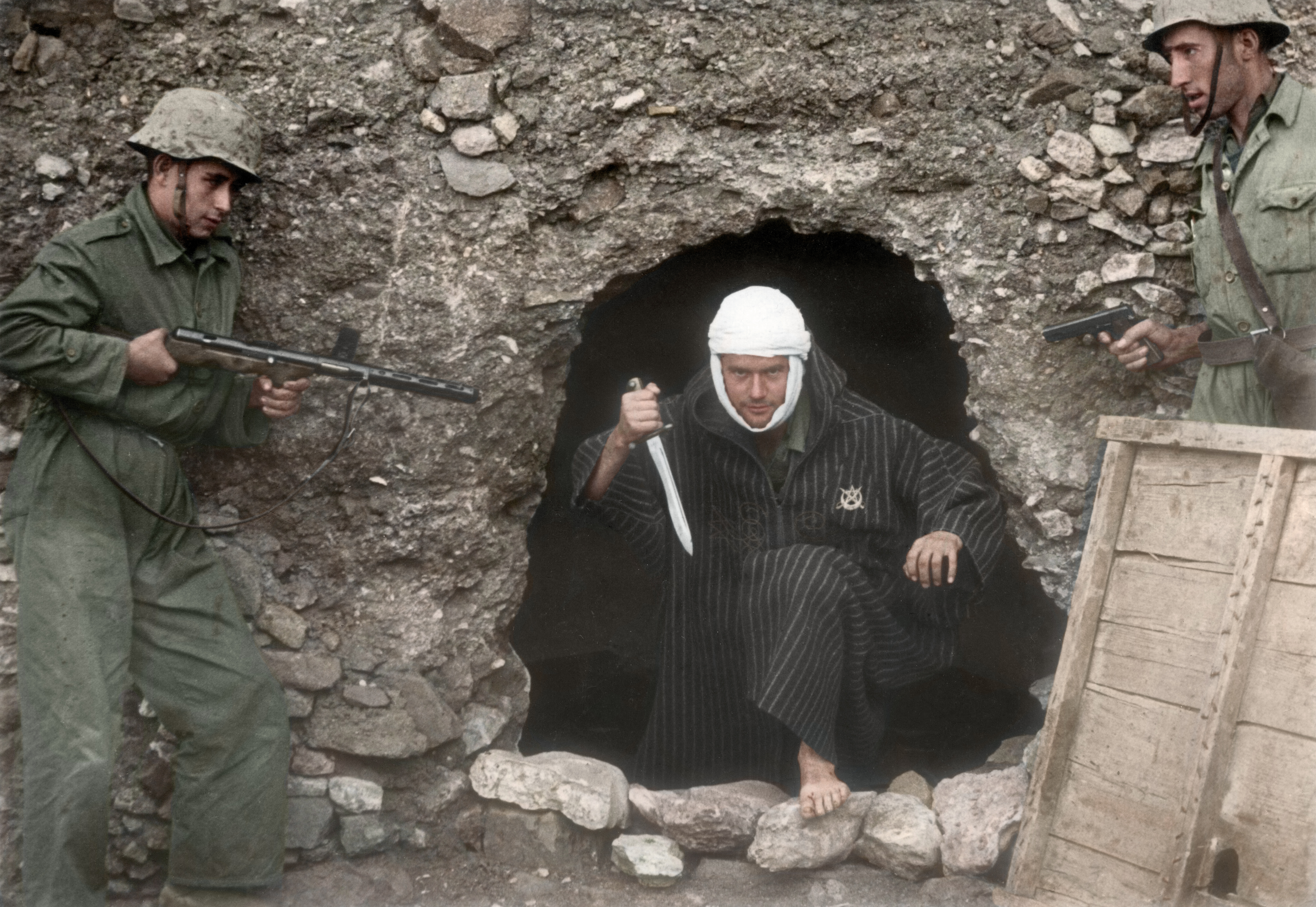
Spanish soldier imitates Moroccan soldier on the streets of Sidi Ifni during the siege, 15 February 1958.

In September 1948, by means of a secret decree, Francisco Franco created the Junta de Investigaciones Atómicas (JIA), or Board for Nuclear Research. Constituted on 8 October, the board was formed by José María Otero de Navascués (general director and president until 1974), Manuel Lora-Tamayo, Armando Durán Miranda and José Ramón Sobredo y Rioboo. In 1951, the secret phase was declared over, and the JIA was renamed the Junta de Energía Nuclear (JEN), or Board of Nuclear Energy, inaugurated in the University City of Madrid under the presidency of General Juan Vigón and with Otero de Navascués as general director. The purpose of the JEN was to work "as a research center, as an advisory body to the Government, as an institute in charge of safety and protection against the danger of ionizing radiation, and as a driving force for industrial development in the field of nuclear energy applications".

=== The Spanish autarky ===
On 1 April 1939, the United States lifted the embargoes placed on Spain after the Spanish Civil War, providing limited recognition to the Spanish State, and the embassy to Spain, previously in Barcelona, now headed by a Chargé d'Affaires ad interim, was moved back to Madrid on the 13th. Yet with Spain acting as all but a member of the Axis powers, there was much skepticism among the Western world as to whether or not they should be allowed to join the organs of the new international order such as the United Nations. Public opinion of the Spanish State was low. At the San Francisco Conference, Spain was barred, while prominent Spanish Republican leaders were in attendance, exerting a notorious influence on several delegations, extended to the conditions of entry into the United Nations.

As well, at the Potsdam Conference, the question of how to proceed with post-war Spain was one of the first to be dealt with. In this sense, Stalin was, in a certain way, seeking revenge against the Francoist State, due in part to the fact that the State had sent the Blue Division (volunteers fighting with the German armed forces) to the Soviet Union during World War II, with a joint statement from the Big Three reading:

The Three Governments feel bound however to make it clear that they for their part would not favour any application for membership put forward by the present Spanish Government, which, having been founded with the support of the Axis Powers, does not, in view of its origins, its nature, its record and its close association with the aggressor States, possess the qualifications necessary to justify such membership.

==== Atoms for Peace and the American connection ====
Yet as the Cold War began, and with Spanish agents, US military officials, and US businessmen lobbying for the opening of relations, popular opinion shifted. The appointment of a US ambassador to Madrid was announced on 27 December 1950. In July 1951, negotiations started for an alliance which would eventually become the Pact of Madrid, and thus in 1955, amidst warming of relations between Spain and the United States as well as Spanish ascension to the UN, Francisco Franco and President Dwight D. Eisenhower signed an agreement of nuclear cooperation as part of the Atoms for Peace initiative, opening up nuclear research to civilians and countries that had not previously possessed nuclear technology. Eisenhower, a proponent of non-proliferation, sought to stop the spread of military use of nuclear weapons. Although the nations that already had atomic weapons kept their weapons and grew their supplies, the program was designed to prevent other countries from developing similar weapons. The program also created regulations for the use of nuclear power, aiming to shape its use into a solely positive means.

This would not necessarily work towards the desired results; (Note: Under Atoms for Peace related programs, the U.S. exported over 25 tons of highly enriched uranium (HEU) to 30 countries, mostly to fuel research reactors, which is now regarded as nuclear proliferation and a terrorism risk.) in fact, it would be this very program which enabled General Franco, accompanied by the Minister of the Presidency of the Government, Luis Carrero Blanco, to inaugurate the Juan Vigón National Nuclear Energy Center at its facilities in the University City of Madrid on 27 December 1958. Together with the 1959 Stabilization Plan and the subsequent Spanish miracle, Spain was able to begin shifting away from the previous autarky, allowing for the beginning of a fledgling civilian nuclear sector which would lay the foundations for Project Islero.

=== The Moroccan deterrent ===
In 1956, Morocco declared independence from France under the rule of Mohammed V. Subsequently, they demanded all lands of Greater Morocco, including the Spanish territories in Africa. While Spain did retrocede the Spanish protectorate in Morocco, they retained control of Ceuta, Melilla, Ifni, the Spanish Sahara, and Cape Juby. This led to Morocco declaring war on Spain in 1957, bitterly asserting the young state's proclaimed sovereignty over Spanish West Africa. The fighting continued until 1958, and although under the Treaty of Angra de Cintra Spain would keep Sidi Ifni (until 1969 when the territory was retroceded), both Cape Juby and surrounding parts of Ifni would be lost to Morocco. From then on, the Defense High Command began to consider armed deterrence in the face of any further potential conflict, and in 1963, they put forth the idea of a Spanish atomic bomb, commissioning a secret report on the possibility of constructing it without alerting the international community.

== Development ==
=== Beginnings (1963–1966) ===
The idea of a Spanish atomic bomb was first envisioned by Agustín Muñoz Grandes. A hardline Falangist, Muñoz Grandes aspired to break from the previous atlanticism promoted during the 50s to make the country independent of both NATO and the United States. In 1963, he approached general director of the JEN, José María Otero de Navascués, about preparing a Spanish foray into atomic weaponry. This new project, christened after the bull which felled the famous bullfighter Manolete, would be helmed by Spanish Air Force general Guillermo Velarde, selected for possessing the scientific background and acumen necessary to conduct the project's research. Velarde was a major general and pilot in the Spanish Air Force, as well as president of the Nuclear Fusion Institute of the Polytechnic University of Madrid. He joined the Theoretical Physics Section of the Nuclear Energy Board, where he would remain as Director of Technology until 1981. He had studied Nuclear Energy at both Pennsylvania State University and the Argonne National Laboratory of the University of Chicago. (Note: In 1973 he obtained the chair of Nuclear Physics at the Higher Technical School of Industrial Engineering, and in 1980 he proposed the creation of the Institute of Nuclear Fusion.)

The work was divided into two phases: the atomic bomb project itself, and the construction of a nuclear reactor, the fuel of which would be extracted for plutonium in order to construct the bombs. While the reactors could be built with help from the French — General de Gaulle supported the idea of an atomic Spain – the matter of what material to use for the bombs themselves, as well as how to actually construct them, was one of consideration. The first results were a fiasco. The JEN specialists, all military, declared themselves incapable of knowing both the technical details for manufacturing the device and, above all, how to obtain the necessary plutonium.

==== Palomares incident ====
Their question was answered on 17 January 1966, when (in what would later be known as the Palomares incident) a B-52G bomber from the United States accidentally crashed while carrying four B28FI Mod 2 Y1 thermonuclear (hydrogen) bombs. Three were found on land near the small fishing village of Palomares in the municipality of Cuevas del Almanzora, Almería, Spain. The non-nuclear explosives in two of the weapons detonated upon impact with the ground, resulting in the contamination of a 0.77-square-mile (2 km^{2}) area with radioactive plutonium. The fourth, which fell into the Mediterranean Sea, was recovered intact after a search lasting two and a half months. The Spanish state conducted secret research on the debris zones of the incident, with technicians led by Velarde finding remains of the bomb and the detonators in the area. This enabled to the project to use plutonium-239 — a boon due to its relative cheapness.

=== Setbacks (1966–1971) ===
Yet later that year, Franco held a meeting with Velarde in which he ordered to indefinitely postpone the physical, but not theoretical, development of the project due to fears that it would be impossible to keep a secret, and with the recent creation of the International Atomic Energy Agency (IAEA), publicity would lead to increased economic sanctions on Spain. He did, however, allow the research to go ahead, albeit detached from the Armed Forces. Franco also pledged not to sign an international agreement being negotiated at the time to prohibit the manufacture of nuclear weapons. Thus on 1 July 1968, when almost fifty countries signed the Treaty on the Non-Proliferation of Nuclear Weapons (NPT), Spain did not number among them. Meanwhile, Spain began to embrace the power of the atom elsewhere. In Guadalajara, the construction of Spain's first nuclear power plant, the José Cabrera Nuclear Power Station, was underway, and JEN installed the first Spanish reactor with capacity to produce plutonium for bombs, Coral-I, able to operate with either plutonium-239 or with 90% enriched uranium (U-235), although with waste still containing almost as much fuel as is consumed. Nevertheless, in 1969, the first grams of Spanish plutonium – the only ones in the world not under IAEA authority – were obtained.

=== Resumption (1971–1977) ===
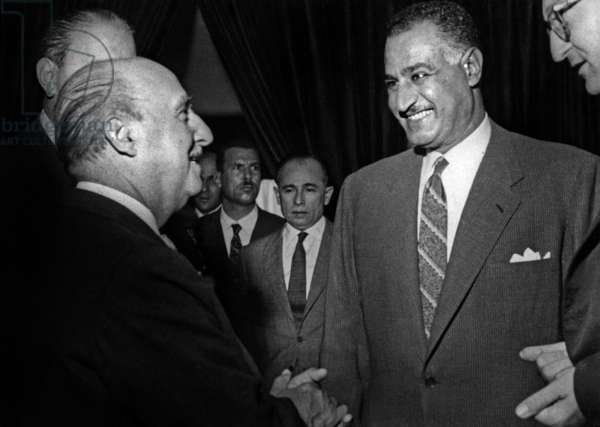
Francisco Franco and Gamal Abdel Nasser, 24 September 1960.

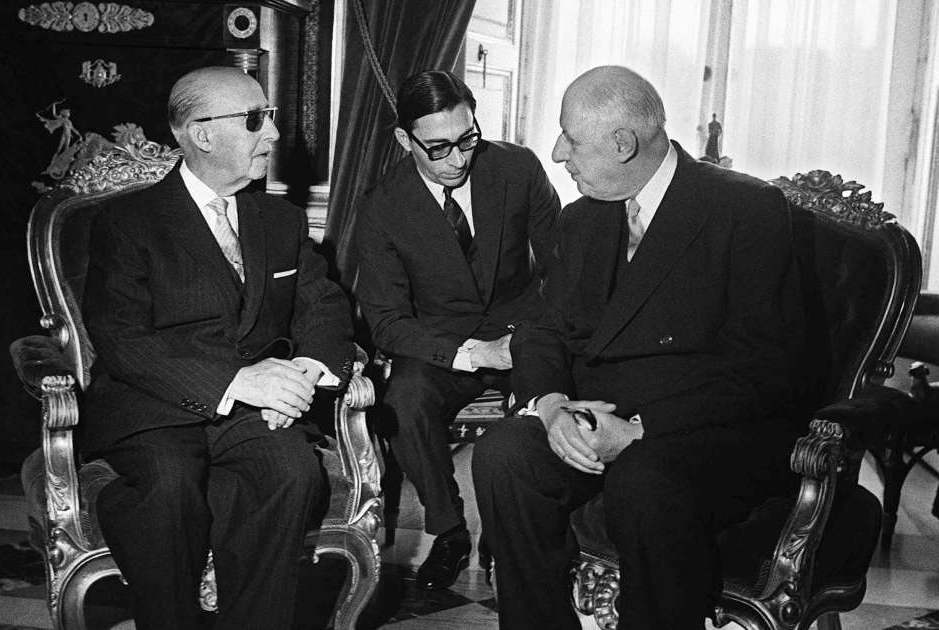
Francisco Franco and Charles de Gaulle, 8 June 1970.

In 1971, at the insistence of Manuel Díez-Alegría, chief of the High General Staff, Velarde resumed Project Islero. The Centro Superior de Estudios de la Defensa Nacional (CESEDEN) would conduct a confidential report which concluded that "Spain could successfully implement the military nuclear option." The plutonium would be produced discreetly at the Vandellòs Nuclear Power Plant, with the Spanish Sahara as a planned test site. All together, the process would cost about 8.7 billion Spanish pesetas, or US$57 million. At the same time, Muñoz Grandes, José María Otero de Navascués and the General Director of JEN Antonio Colino entered into negotiations with de Gaulle's France to obtain a natural uranium graphite and gas-fired nuclear reactor for Spain. Obtaining enough plutonium to build the bomb (6 kilos), in a country whose subsoil contained the second largest natural uranium reserves in Europe, was no longer considered a dream with the help of the French, who themselves did not allow the IAEA to inspect their plants. Both General Charles De Gaulle and Georges Pompidou, his successor as President of France, were in favor of the project from the outset; the presence of an allied nuclear power on the continent was seen as a means of increasing French independence from both the United States and NATO. To this end, the Hispano Francesa de Energía Nuclear S.A. (HIFRENSA) was set up, and in 1972 the Vandellòs-I plant was inaugurated with an agreement between Luis Carrero Blanco and Charles De Gaulle.

On 15 December 1973, Velarde communicated to Lieutenant-General Manuel Díez-Alegría — who, as head of the High Command in the early 1970s, had encouraged him to pursue his investigations – and to his trusted confidant, Brigadier General Manuel Gutiérrez Mellado, that Spain had the capacity to manufacture three plutonium bombs a year. Díez-Alegría ordered him to put his findings in writing. However, the secrecy surrounding the Spanish nuclear program did not bode well with their American allies. The Spanish projects had aroused particular interest among the CIA, but with the ascension of Carrero Blanco to Prime Minister of Spain, this interest quickly turned to concern. Although a convinced Anti-Communist, Carrero Blanco had little inclination for the United States and even less for Israel, being in favor of a better understanding with the Arab World. Above all else, Carrero Blanco proposed to revise relations between Spain and the United States, demanding that the two nations be treated as equals, that Spain be supplied with advanced military technology, and that the United States enter into a commitment to defend Spain – all prerequisites for authorization to continue using military bases on Spanish territory. As well, according to some confidential reports declassified by the US Military Intelligence Service, Spain was storing plutonium to manufacture a nuclear bomb, diverting it from IAEA controls; something completely out of line for an American ally, an action on par with a rogue state. The CIA informed U.S. Secretary of State Henry Kissinger that Project Islero would soon bear fruit, and with tensions between Spain and America on the rise due to the 1973 Oil Crisis and Yom Kippur War, a meeting was soon called with Carrero Blanco.

==== Kissinger's meeting ====
Four days after the Velarde report, Carrero Blanco met Kissinger, and told him that the Spanish government wanted the United States to pledge its support of Spain in the event of aggression. When Kissinger refused, Carrero Blanco showed him Velarde's report, which caused the Secretary of State much distress. Kissinger, although failing to acquire Spanish adhesion to the NPT, did convey a clear message: the confirmation of Franco's desire for military nuclear devices made a "tight control" necessary over these activities. That same day, Kissinger left Madrid in a hurry, and the next morning on 20 December 1973, Carrero Blanco was murdered. Involvement of the CIA in the attack has been suggested by certain scholars, with a potential motivation being the desire to remove Carrero Blanco and to put an end to the program.

==== Aftermath ====
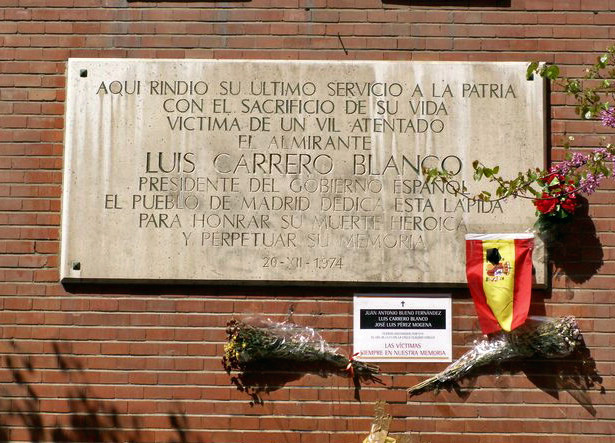
Memorial plate at the site of the Assassination of Luis Carrero Blanco.

Soon after, the project began to falter when Gregorio López-Bravo blocked its completion. The minister had spoken to Franco to convince him to put an end to it, arguing that the Americans would eventually get wind of the project and that this would cause Spain an endless series of problems. Muñoz Grandes, already very ill at the time, failed to convince Franco of his plans to use the atomic bomb and French alliance as a way to gain greater independence from the United States. Franco saw it as a costly operation involving a challenge to Washington, whose support he considered more important than having his own bomb or drawing closer to France. Franco put an end to the heated discussions by ordering a halt to the research and forbidding the military project to be set in motion, informing Velarde that "Spain could not support a new international blockade unleashed by the United States, and the benefits of having a small arsenal did not outweigh the damage".

Yet neither Carrero Blanco's death, nor the abrupt dismissal of Díez-Alegría on 13 June 1974, nor even Franco's death on 20 November 1975, would bring the project to a halt. Carrero Blanco's successor, Carlos Arias Navarro, wanted to give a new impetus to the Islero project, and indeed, even though it was struggling to develop – not least because of continued pressure from the United States and its President Jimmy Carter for Spain to sign the NPT — in 1976, the Spanish Foreign Minister, José María de Areilza, would declare that Spain would be able to manufacture the bomb "in seven or eight years if we set our minds to it. We do not want to be the last on the list." Even with the Spanish transition to democracy and arrival of President Adolfo Suárez and the Union of the Democratic Centre (UCD) in 1976, the project would continue on with internal support. Suárez, who advocated a policy of neutrality and friendship towards the Arab world to prevent problems in the Canary Islands, Ceuta, and Melilla, supported the idea of a Spanish atomic bomb as a final deterrent against any armed aggression. Tensions with the USA increased further in 1977, when it became public knowledge of the technological capabilities of the nuclear facilities planned for the Soria Nuclear Research Center (Centro de Investigación Nuclear de Soria, abbreviated to CINSO) in Cubo de la Solana. American investigators were alarmed to discover that the plant designed to convert uranium into plutonium could produce 140 kilos of plutonium per year, sufficient to manufacture 23 annual bombs.

=== End (1977–1987) ===
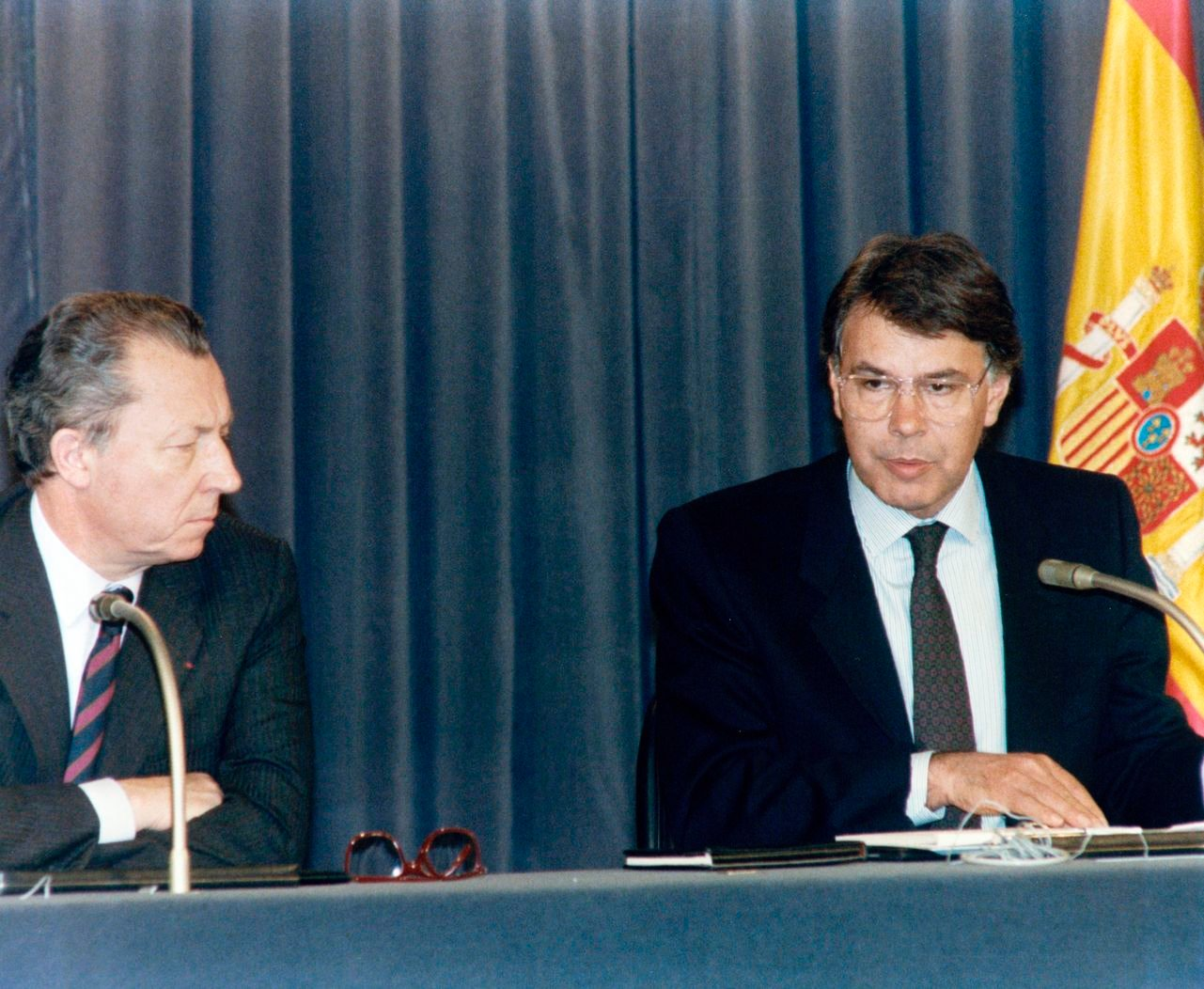
Felipe González and the President of the European Commission, Jacques Delors, 8 January 1989.

While internally the project was well underway, externally, American pressures continued to mount; during his four-year rule, President Jimmy Carter had launched a campaign against the states that had not signed the NPT. In addition, the already nervous United States became obsessed with the IAEA inspecting suspicious Spanish facilities: if this inspection was prevented, the US would freeze enriched uranium exports to Spain, which would mean the industrial halt of civilian nuclear power plants that were already operating. Thus, on 23 February 1981, the UCD-led Calvo-Sotelo Government agreed to subject the materials to inspection by the IAEA, the same day as the 1981 Spanish coup d'état attempt. However, this decision did not yet mean the definitive end of Project Islero, since the UCD still continued to lightly advocate it. On the other hand, the Spanish Socialist Workers' Party (PSOE) had already resolved to abandon the Spanish nuclear project and remain in NATO, in return for Spain's integration into the European Economic Community (EEC), and following the 1986 Spanish NATO membership referendum and subsequent general election, González began to finalize the end of Project Islero. On 13 October 1987, the Spanish representative to the UN, Fernando Morán of the PSOE-led González Government, signed the NPT, bringing an official end to the project.

== Legacy ==
Today, Spain has more than enough capacity to develop an atomic bomb in a relatively short period of time, with studies conducted in 2004 revealing that Spain has sufficient technology and resources to develop a nuclear program capable of producing several bombs a year. Additionally, the advances made under Project Islero have continued to manifest in Spanish life, with 7 nuclear fission reactors operating in the country, utilizing uranium deposits to produce a fifth of the energy consumed in Spain, as well as a ENUSA nuclear fuel factory in Juzbado, Salamanca, and a low and medium activity radioactive waste storage center in El Cabril, Córdoba in the heart of the Sierra Morena.

== See also ==
- Antonio Meulener
- Nuclear power in Spain

== Bibliography ==
- Velarde, Guillermo (2016). Proyecto Islero: cuando España pudo desarrollar armas nucleares. Córdoba: Editorial Guadalmazán. ISBN 978-84-943-8468-4.
- "La bomba atómica de España: Proyecto Islero, en Documentos RNE". RTVE. 13 January 2017.
- Noguera, Jaime (18 September 2018). "Proyecto Islero: cuando el Ejército español quiso probar una bomba atómica en el Sahara". Público.
- Muñoz Bolaños, Roberto (January 2014). "El Proyecto Islero. La bomba atómica española". ResearchGate.
