= Pact of Madrid =

1953 treaty between Spain and the United States

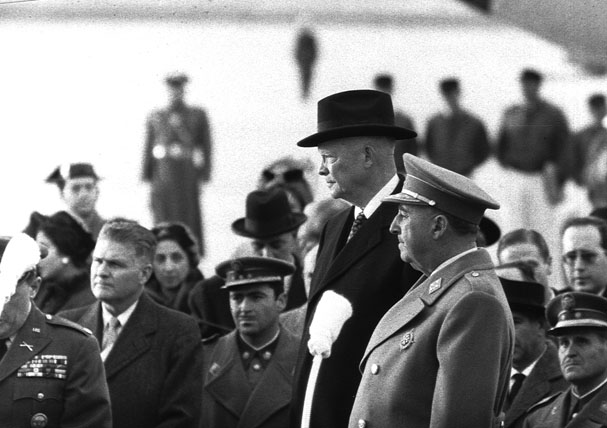
Head of state of Spain, Francisco Franco, and U.S. President Dwight D. Eisenhower at the U.S. Torrejón Air Base near Madrid during the U.S. President's visit to Spain in 1959.

The so-called Pacts of Madrid of 1953 were three "executive agreements" signed in Madrid on September 23, 1953, between the United States and Spain, then under the dictatorship of General Franco. Under these agreements, five U.S. military bases were to be established on Spanish soil in exchange for economic and military aid. For the Francoist regime, these pacts, alongside the concordat with the Catholic Church signed a month earlier, marked its definitive integration into the Western bloc after years of isolation following World War II due to its ties with the Axis powers. The Spanish government also received additional assistance known as "American aid."

The agreements were a significant effort to break Spain's international isolation post-World War II, a period when the victorious Allies of World War II and much of the world remained hostile to a fascist regime sympathetic to the Axis cause and established with German and Italian assistance.

== Background ==
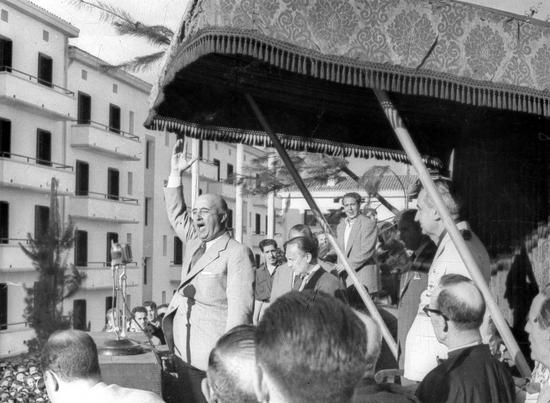
Franco delivering a speech in Eibar in 1949. During the regime's isolation period, General Franco rarely appeared in military uniform, unlike the rest of his tenure.

By late 1947, signs emerged that the Western powers' stance toward Franco's regime was softening, as the former World War II allies split into the "free world" versus the "communist dictatorship," in the words of President Harry Truman. The outbreak of the "Cold War" ultimately benefited the Francoist regime, giving Spain newfound strategic value to the Western bloc against a potential Soviet attack on Europe not controlled by the Red Army.

In November 1947, the United States successfully opposed a new condemnation of Franco's regime at the UN and prevented further sanctions. Four months later, France reopened its border with Spain, closed in 1946 after the execution of Cristino García Granda. Between May and June 1948, trade and financial agreements were signed with France and the United Kingdom. Early in 1949, the Francoist regime received its first U.S. bank loan, approved by the American government, worth $25 million. Shortly before, the chairman of the U.S. Senate Armed Services Committee had visited Spain.

The "rehabilitation" of the Francoist regime was formally completed in 1950, following the outbreak of the Korean War in June, the first major Cold War confrontation. Upon learning of North Korea's invasion of South Korea, the Spanish government quickly sent a note to the U.S. offering "to assist the United States in halting communism by sending forces to Korea." The U.S. merely thanked Spain, but the following month, the Senate, at the urging of Democrat Pat McCarran—a member of the Spanish Lobby created by José Félix de Lequerica, Franco's unofficial representative in Washington—authorized the Export-Import Bank to grant Spain a $62.5 million loan. On November 4, 1950, the UN General Assembly, with strong U.S. support and French and British abstentions, revoked the December 1946 resolution condemning Franco's regime by a wide margin—38 in favor, 10 against, 12 abstentions. In the following months, Western ambassadors returned to Madrid, and Spain's entry into UN specialized agencies was approved.

The U.S. interest in Spain centered on its geostrategic value: besides controlling the Strait of Gibraltar, the Spanish mainland could serve as a rear base for U.S. military operations in Europe, while the Canary Islands offered a prime position for controlling a vast Atlantic and northwestern African area.

== Agreements ==
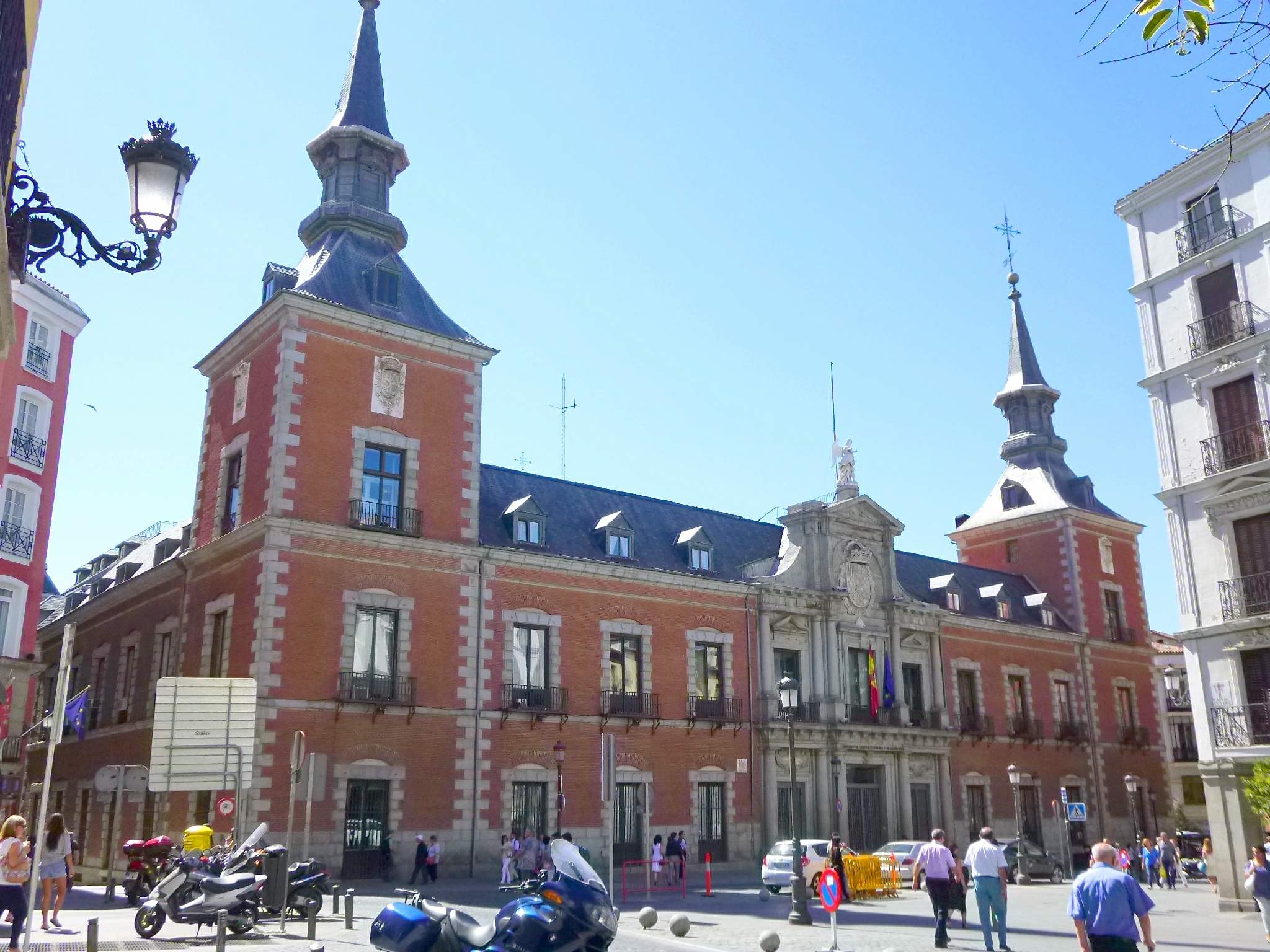
Palacio de Santa Cruz, headquarters of the Ministry of Foreign Affairs, where the Madrid Pacts were signed.

Negotiations with the U.S. began in April 1952—after the U.S. Chief of Naval Operations had met Franco in Madrid in July 1951, reaching a preliminary military cooperation agreement. The U.S. delegation was led by General August Kissner for military matters and George Train for economic issues, while Spain's delegation was headed by General Juan Vigón. Initial U.S. reluctance to politically endorse Franco was overcome after Dwight Eisenhower's election, with the appointment of James Dunn as ambassador to Madrid, who was more flexible than his predecessor in accepting Spain's terms. The agreements were signed on September 23, 1953, but they were not treaties—as Spain had requested—but "executive agreements" between governments, as a treaty would have required U.S. Senate approval, which was unattainable due to widespread opposition to Franco's regime.

At the signing ceremony in the Palacio de Santa Cruz, the unequal nature of the agreements was evident: Spain was represented by Foreign Minister Alberto Martín-Artajo and Commerce Minister Manuel Arburúa, while the U.S. delegation consisted only of its ambassador and the president of the U.S. Chamber of Commerce in Spain.

The Pacts of Madrid comprised three agreements: the first dealt with U.S. provision of war materiel to Spain; the second covered economic aid, including loans; the third, the most significant, addressed mutual defense aid, establishing U.S. military bases on Spanish soil. Spain committed "to contribute fully to the development and maintenance of its own defensive power and that of the free world... to the extent permitted by its human potential, resources, facilities, and general economic condition," and "consistent with its political and economic stability," effectively securing U.S. support for the Francoist regime. The base agreement stated:

The Government of Spain authorizes the Government of the United States... to develop, maintain, and use for military purposes, jointly with the Government of Spain, those areas and facilities in Spanish territory under Spanish jurisdiction deemed necessary by the competent authorities of both governments for the purposes of this Agreement. [...] The areas prepared for joint use under this Agreement shall always remain under the Spanish flag and command, and Spain shall undertake to adopt the necessary measures for their external security. However, the United States may, in all cases, exercise the necessary oversight over U.S. personnel, facilities, and equipment.

The bases were theoretically under joint Spanish-U.S. sovereignty, but a secret protocol, revealed years later, allowed the U.S. to unilaterally decide their use "in the event of clear communist aggression threatening Western security" without notifying Spain. Nuclear weapons, including those on nuclear submarines, were stored at these bases—even at Torrejón Air Base, near Madrid.

== Consequences ==
Map of shared-use bases

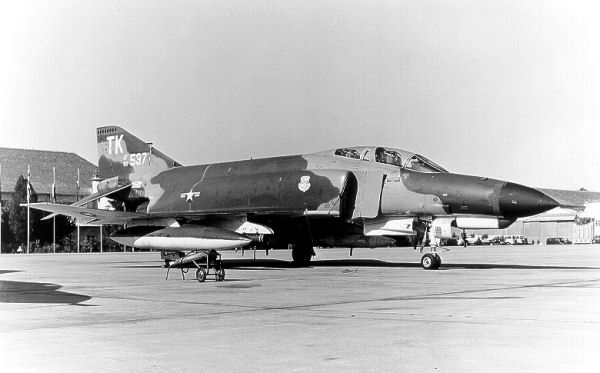
U.S. fighter jet at Torrejón Air Base (1970).

Over the first ten years of the agreements, which were later extended, five major U.S. military bases were established in Spain: four air bases (Morón Air Base, Zaragoza Air Base, Torrejón Air Base, and San Pablo Air Base) and one naval base (Naval Station Rota), along with smaller facilities like Air Surveillance Squadrons. Around 7,000 U.S. military personnel and their families were stationed there. U.S. presence extended to sites in Constantina, El Frasno, Villatobas, Sonseca, Roses, L'Estartit, Alcoy, Elizondo, Sóller, and Mañón.

Between 1953 and 1963, Spain received over $1.5 billion in U.S. economic aid, primarily loans managed by the Export-Import Bank to purchase U.S. goods like food, cotton, and coal. Military aid totaled $456 million in second-hand equipment, modernizing the Spanish Armed Forces, which still relied on Italian and German weapons from the Spanish Civil War. However, the U.S. restricted their use to defensive purposes.

From 1954 to 1961, military aid amounted to $500 million in grants. Between 1962 and 1982, an additional $1.238 billion was provided—$727 million in loans and $511 million in grants. From 1983 to 1986, aid averaged $400 million annually in concessional credit sales, dropping to just over $100 million annually in 1987 and 1988, with plans to phase it out by 1989 as Spain grew more self-sufficient. Over 200 Spanish officers and NCOs received annual training in the U.S. under a parallel program.

Geostrategically, Spain joined the Western defense system but was excluded from decision-making, barred from NATO—founded in 1949—due to European members' opposition to Franco's dictatorship and its Axis ties. Spain thus became "a strategic satellite rather than a formal ally of the United States." The U.S. Joint Chiefs of Staff saw these bases as vital for an orderly retreat from Central Europe in case of a Soviet attack.

The pacts' primary benefit was political, ending the international isolation Franco's regime had faced since 1945. However, Julio Gil Pecharromán notes that Spanish politicians and military soon felt treated as junior partners, receiving "little more than crumbs" of aid, yet the National Movement had no choice but to rely on this powerful protector to maintain power. Stanley G. Payne agrees: "This relationship undoubtedly bolstered the regime's image at home and abroad. Martín Artajo claimed it validated Franco's stance from the start. Yet, there was significant domestic opposition—though stifled—viewing it as asymmetrical and risking Spain's involvement in U.S.-led conflicts."

=== Impact on the Spanish Armed Forces ===
Examples of military equipment supplied by the U.S. to Spain
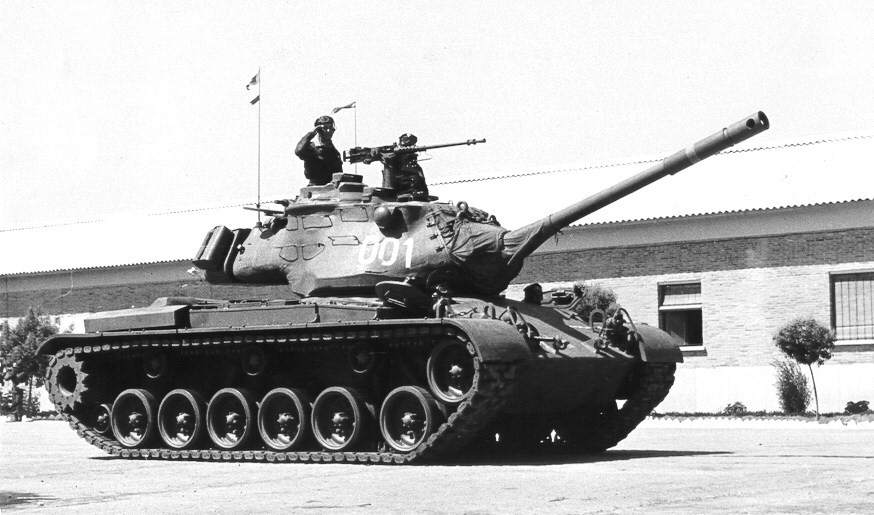
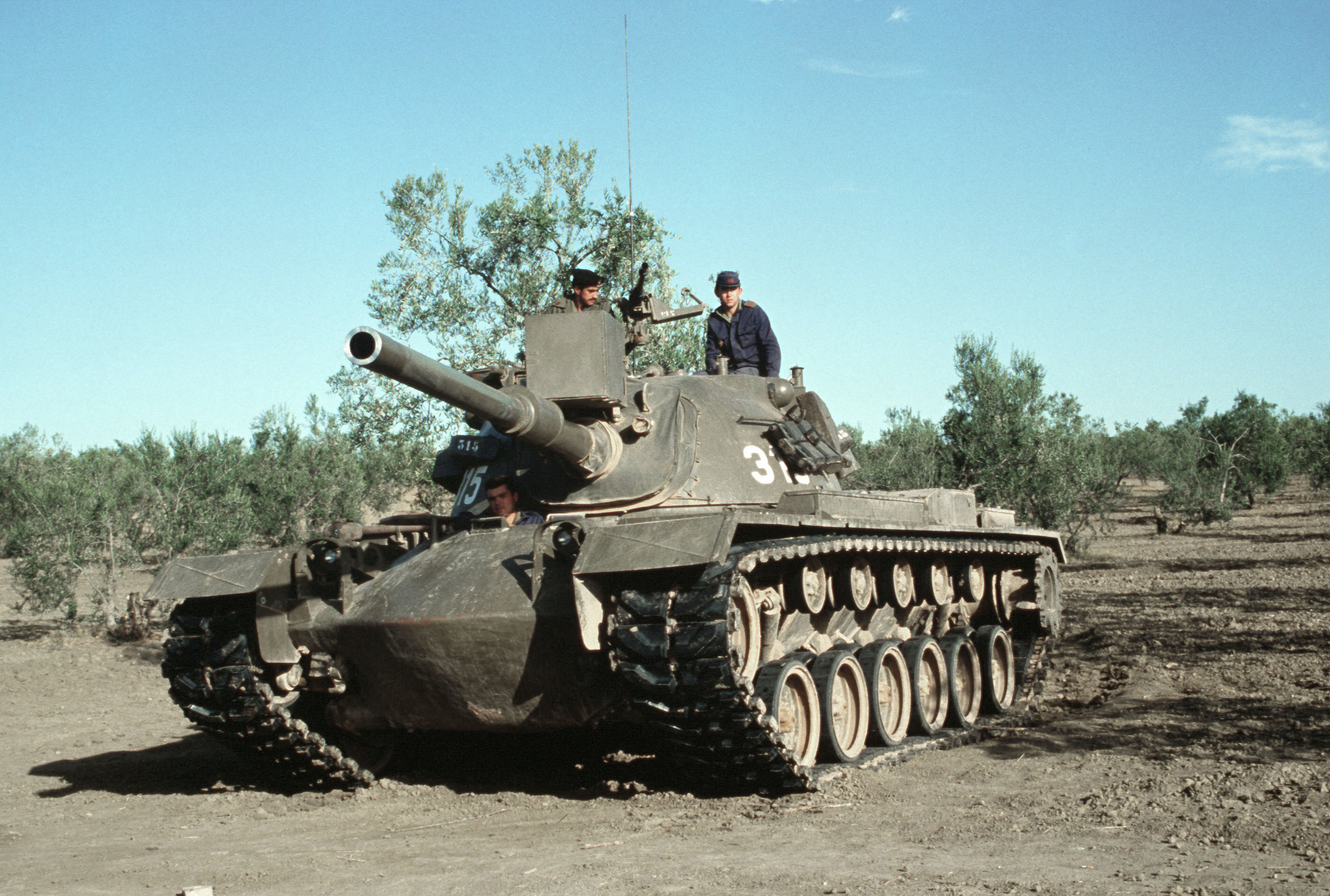
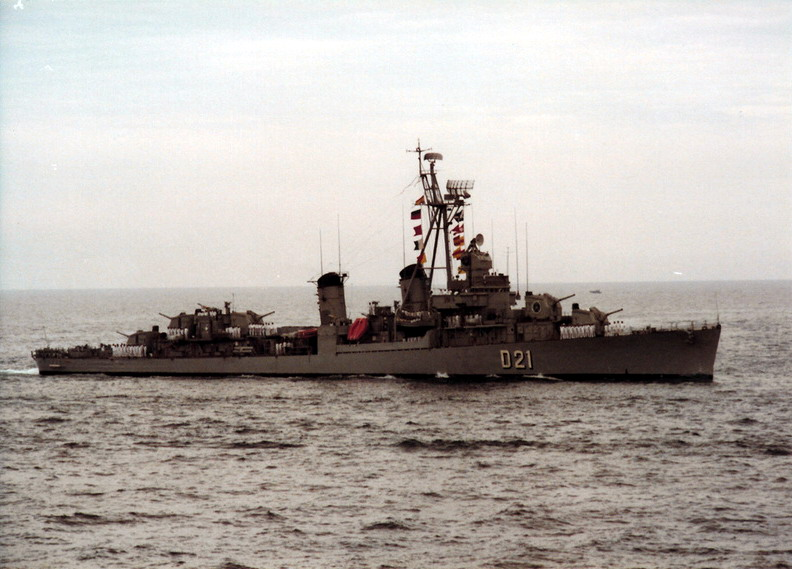
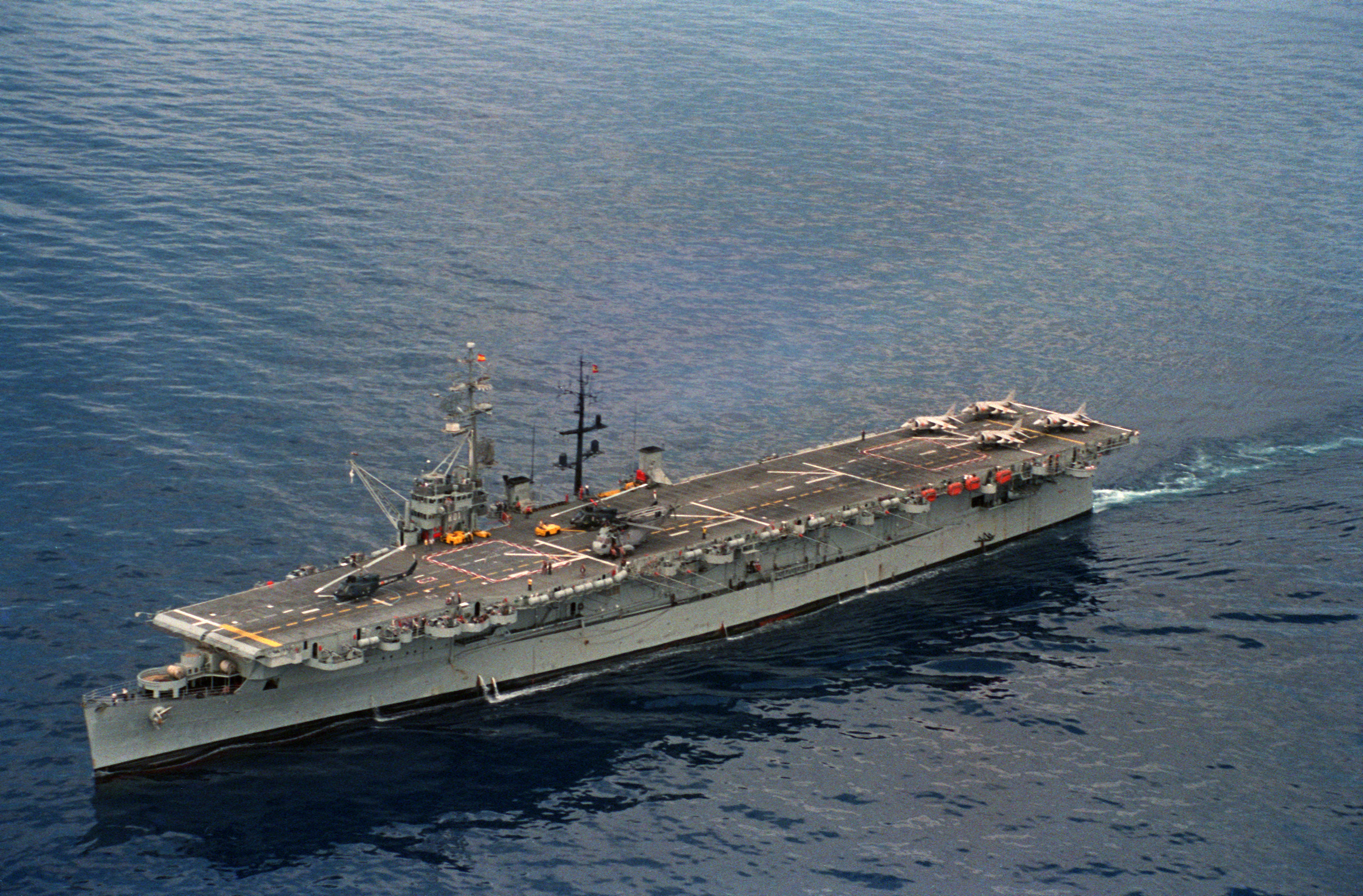
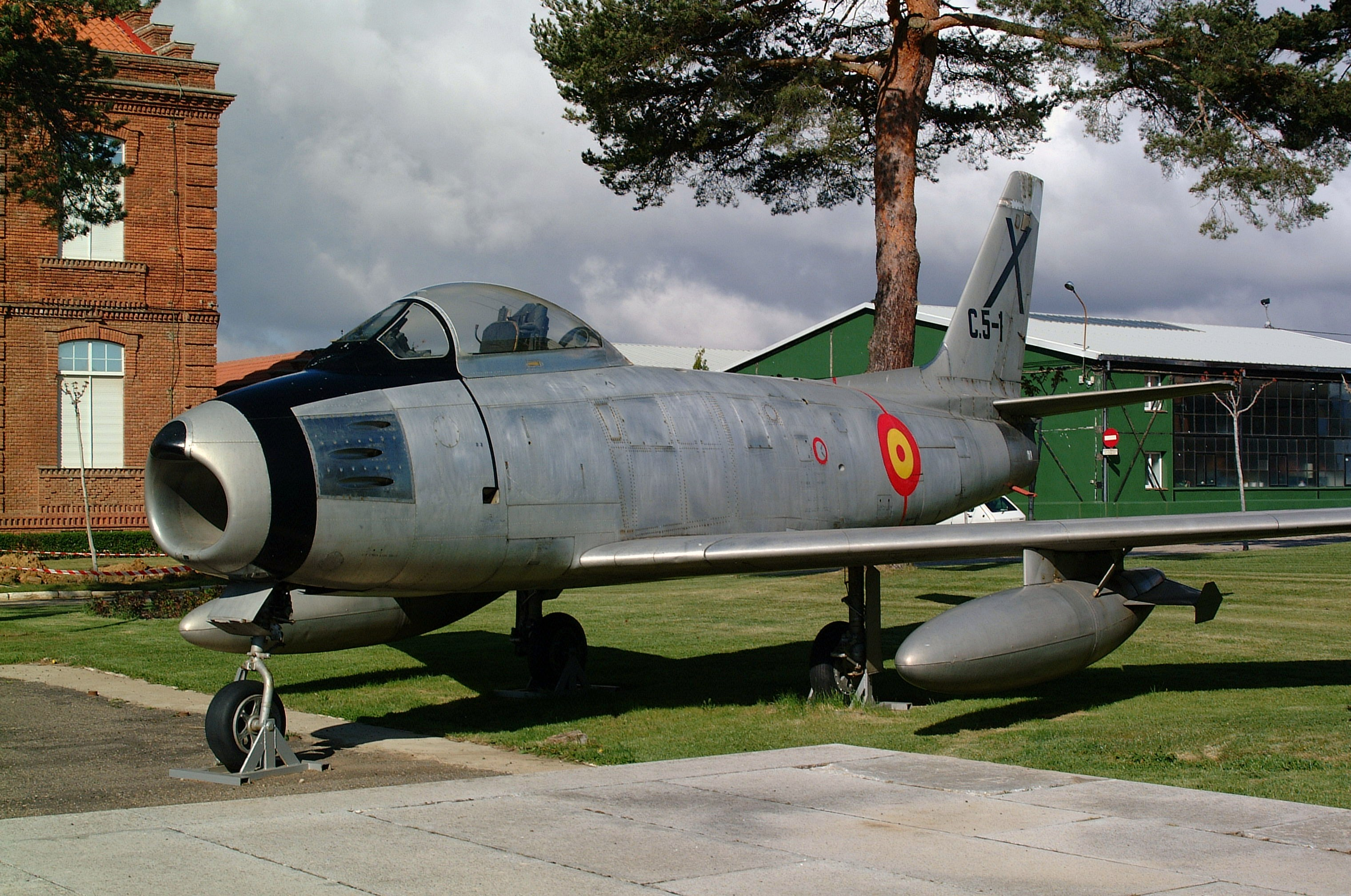
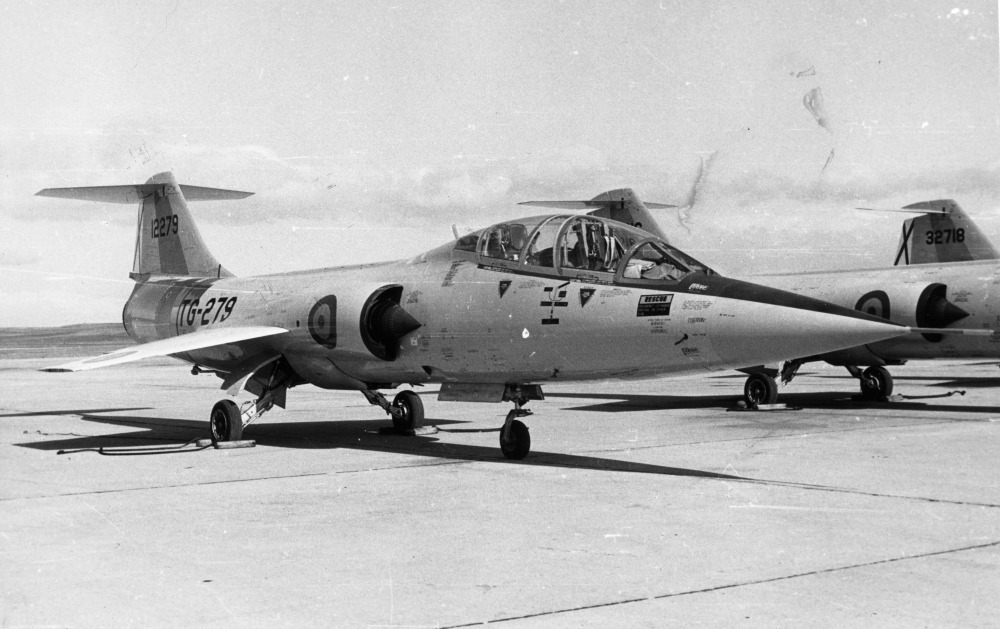
Top: M47 Patton and M48 Patton tanks
Middle: Lepanto-class frigate and aircraft carrier Dédalo
Bottom: F-86 Sabre and Lockheed F-104 Starfighter fighters.

Below is a summary of equipment provided by the U.S. under the 1953 agreements and subsequent deals:

==== Impact on the Army ====
Delivery of M47 Patton, M48 Patton, M24 Chaffee, and M41 Walker Bulldog tanks; M-1A3 cannons; M101, M114, and M37 howitzers; M3 half-tracks; and M4 vehicles.

==== Impact on the Navy ====
Modernization of Audaz-class and Liniers-class destroyers, Pizarro-class frigates, D-class submarines, and smaller vessels (torpedo boats, minelayers, gunboats, minesweepers). Later deliveries included the aircraft carrier Dédalo, Lepanto-class and Churruca-class destroyers, Balao-class submarines, and additional smaller craft. Collaboration in developing Baleares-class frigates.

==== Impact on the Air Force ====
Delivery of F-86 Sabre fighters, Lockheed T-33 trainers, T-6 Texan propeller trainers, DC-3 and DC-4 transport aircraft, and Grumman Albatross patrol and rescue planes. Later additions included Lockheed F-104 Starfighter and F-4 Phantom II fighters, Caribou and C-97 Stratofreighter transports, Boeing KC-97 Stratotanker tankers, and Bell 47 and UH-1 Iroquois helicopters.

== See also ==
- First Francoism
- Spain–United States relations
- United States Air Forces in Europe
- Naval Station Rota
- Morón Air Base
- Zaragoza Air Base
- Torrejón Air Base
- Concordat of 1953
- Project Islero
- 1966 Palomares B-52 crash

== Bibliography ==
- Gil Pecharromán, Julio (2008). Con permiso de la autoridad. La España de Franco (1939-1975) [With the Authority's Permission: Franco's Spain (1939-1975)] (in Spanish). Madrid: Temas de Hoy. ISBN 978-84-8460-693-2.
- Moradiellos, Enrique (2000). La España de Franco (1939-1975). Política y sociedad [Franco's Spain (1939-1975): Politics and Society] (in Spanish). Madrid: Síntesis. ISBN 84-7738-740-0.
- Payne, Stanley G. (1997). El primer franquismo. Los años de la autarquía [The First Francoism: The Autarky Years] (in Spanish). Madrid: Historia 16-Temas de Hoy. ISBN 84-7679-325-1.
