= Juan Vigón =

Juan Vigón may refer to:

- Juan Vigón (general) (1880-1955), Spanish general
- Juan Vigón (footballer) (born 1991), Mexican footballer
