= Agustín Muñoz Grandes =

Spanish politician (1896–1970)

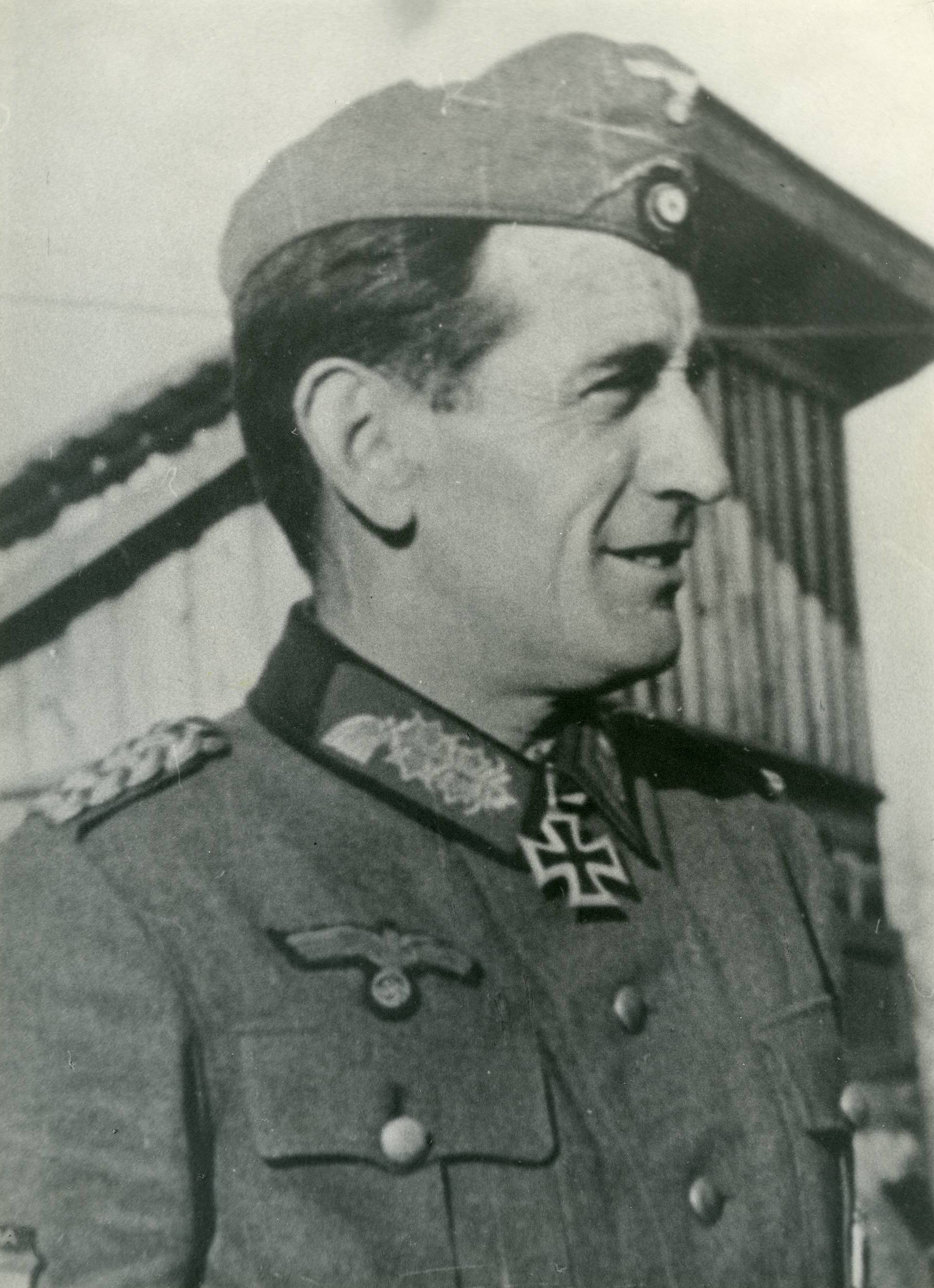
- General Muñoz Grandes as an officer of the Wehrmacht, 1941–43

Deputy Prime Minister of Spain
- In office 11 July 1962 – 22 July 1967
- Prime Minister: Francisco Franco
- Preceded by: Francisco Gómez-Jordana Sousa (1938–39)
- Succeeded by: Luis Carrero Blanco

Minister of the Army
- In office 19 July 1951 – 25 February 1957
- Preceded by: Fidel Dávila Arrondo
- Succeeded by: Antonio Barroso Sánchez-Guerra

Personal details
- Born: 27 January 1896 Carabanchel Bajo, Spain
- Died: 11 July 1970 (aged 74) Madrid, Spain
- Party: FET y de las JONS
- Children: Agustín Muñoz-Grandes Galilea
- Education: Toledo Infantry Academy

Military service
- Allegiance: Kingdom of Spain (1915–1931); Spanish Republic (1931–1936); Nationalist Spain (1936–1941, 1942–1950); Nazi Germany (1941–1942)
- Branch/service: Spanish Army; German Army (Wehrmacht)
- Years of service: 1915–41, 1942–50 (Spain); 1941–42 (Germany)
- Rank: General
- Commands: Blue Division
- Battles/wars: Rif War Spanish Civil War: Battle of Málaga; World War II: Eastern Front
- Awards: Knight's Cross of the Iron Cross with Oak Leaves; Military Medal; Legion of Merit

Agustín Muñoz Grandes (27 January 1896 – 11 July 1970) was a Spanish general, and politician, vice-president of the Spanish Government and minister with Francisco Franco several times; also known as the commander of the Blue Division between 1941 and 1942.

== Biography ==
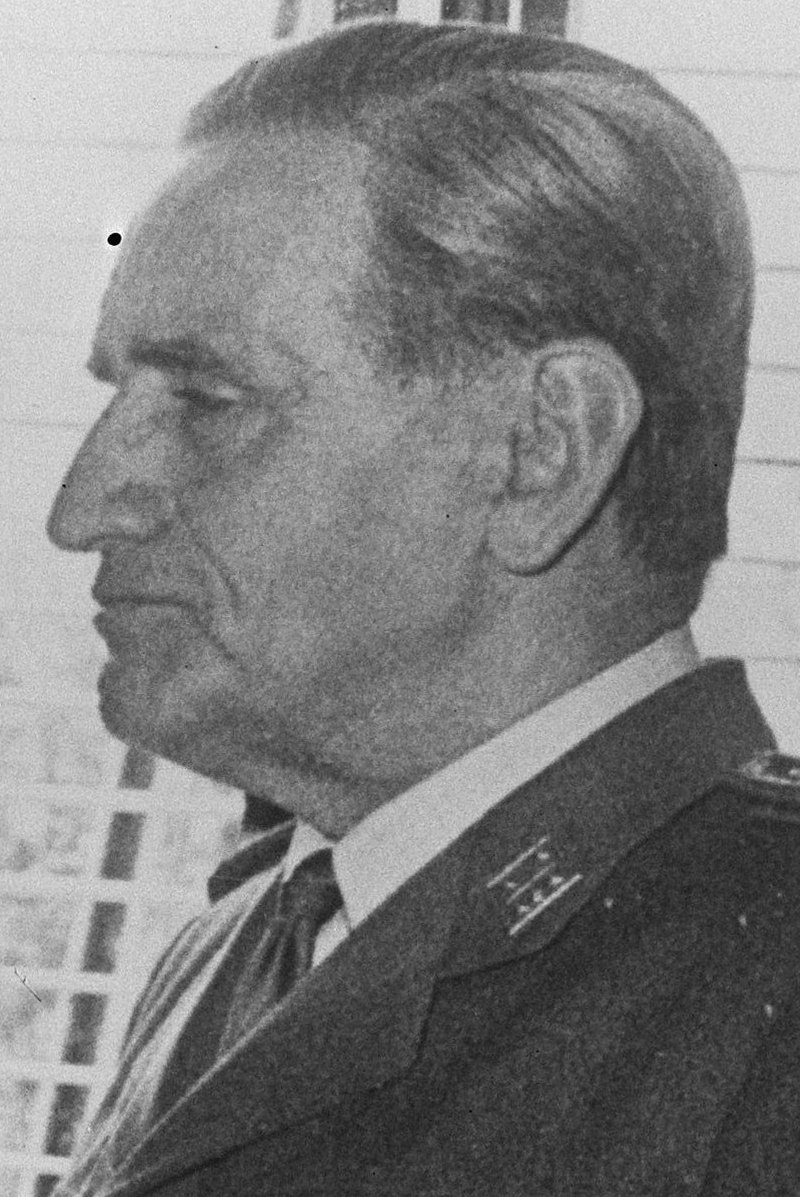
General Muñoz Grandes in 1962

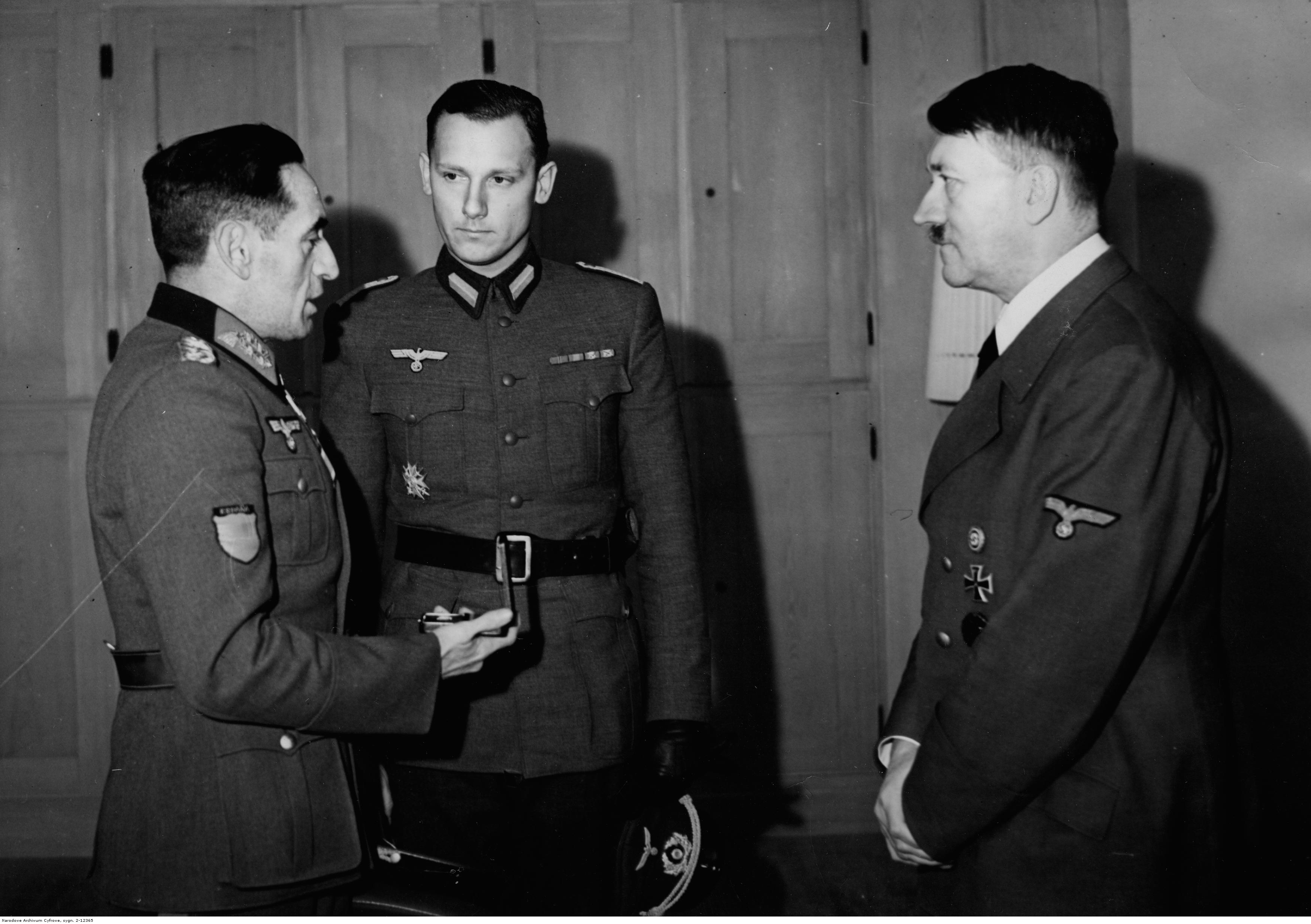
Spanish General Augustin Munoz Grandes visiting Adolf Hitler on December 16, 1942

Born in Carabanchel Bajo on 27 January 1896, Muñoz Grandes enrolled at the Toledo Infantry Academy while in his teens. Upon graduating, he was deployed to Morocco in 1915 and in 1925 took part in the decisive Battle of Alhucemas. Muñoz Grandes fought for the Nationalists during the Spanish Civil War and was promoted to General, taking command in the Army of Africa. He led the Spanish Legionnaries in the conquest of Málaga by the Nationalists in February 1937. In 1941, Muñoz Grandes was given command of the División Azul, Generalísimo Franco's volunteer unit created for service under the Wehrmacht on the Eastern Front, against the Soviet Union. Muñoz Grandes was well acquainted with the Nazi German military establishment, and attended several interviews with Wilhelm Canaris and Adolf Hitler.

During his command Muñoz Grandes was decorated with the Knight's Cross of the Iron Cross, with Oak Leaves personally added by Hitler. He was recalled to Spain in December 1942. A promotion to Lieutenant General awaited him at home, and his post on the Eastern Front was taken up by Emilio Esteban Infantes.

Muñoz Grandes was appointed Captain General of I Military District in 1945, Minister of the Army in 1951 and Chief of the Defence High Command (chief of staff of the Spanish Armed Forces) in 1958. He served as Deputy Prime Minister of Spain from 1962 to 1967. In this capacity he advised Franco to enter the Vietnam War in order to gain better relations with the United States; however, Franco was reluctant to publicly support the war or the United States, and ultimately only several teams of medical personnel were sent, covertly.

Muñoz Grandes died in 1970. His wife Maria died in 1989.

== Awards ==
- Order of Cisneros (1956, 1970)
- Knight's Cross of the Iron Cross (12 March 1942)
  - Oak Leaves (12 December 1942)
- Iron Cross (1939)
  - 2nd Class (8 September 1941)
  - 1st Class (19 January 1942)
- Legion of Merit (1954)

== Bibliography ==
- Fellgiebel, Walther-Peer (2000) [1986]. Die Träger des Ritterkreuzes des Eisernen Kreuzes 1939–1945 — Die Inhaber der höchsten Auszeichnung des Zweiten Weltkrieges aller Wehrmachtteile [The Bearers of the Knight's Cross of the Iron Cross 1939–1945 — The Owners of the Highest Award of the Second World War of all Wehrmacht Branches] (in German). Friedberg, Germany: Podzun-Pallas. ISBN 978-3-7909-0284-6.
- Kleinfeld, Gerald A. (1979). Hitler's Spanish Legion: The Blue Division in Russia. Southern Illinois University Press. ISBN 0-8093-0865-7.
- Thomas, Franz (1998). Die Eichenlaubträger 1939–1945 Band 2: L–Z [The Oak Leaves Bearers 1939–1945 Volume 2: L–Z] (in German). Osnabrück, Germany: Biblio-Verlag. ISBN 978-3-7648-2300-9.
- Tremlett, Giles (2025). El Generalísimo -- Franco: Power, Violence and the Quest for Greatness. Bloomsbury Publishing. ISBN 978-1-5266-5199-0.

Party political offices
Preceded by Raimundo Fernández-Cuesta	Minister–Secretary General of FET y de las JONS; 9 August 1939 – 16 March 1940	Vacant Title next held by José Luis de Arrese
Government offices
Preceded by Fidel Dávila Arrondo	Minister of the Army; 19 July 1951 – 25 February 1957	Succeeded by Antonio Barroso Sánchez-Guerra
Vacant Title last held by Francisco Gómez-Jordana Sousa	Deputy Prime Minister of Spain; 11 July 1962 – 22 July 1967	Succeeded by Luis Carrero Blanco
Military offices
New title	Commander of the Blue Division; 20 July 1941 – 13 December 1942	Succeeded by Emilio Esteban Infantes
Preceded by Carlos Asensio Cabanillas	Chief of the Defence High Command; 6 June 1958 – 11 July 1970	Succeeded by Manuel Díez-Alegría
