= Carlos Fernández Vallespín =

Spanish military officer

General Carlos Fernández Vallespín

President of the Board of Joint Chiefs of Staff
- In office 2 February 1977 – 28 April 1977
- Monarch: Juan Carlos I
- Preceded by: Position established
- Succeeded by: Felipe Galarza Sánchez

Chief of the Defence High Command
- In office 15 June 1974 – 28 April 1977
- Monarch: Juan Carlos I (from 1975)
- Leader: Francisco Franco (until 1975)
- Preceded by: Manuel Díez-Alegría
- Succeeded by: Felipe Galarza Sánchez

Personal details
- Born: Carlos Fernández Vallespín; 13 July 1913 Ferrol, Galicia, Kingdom of Spain
- Died: 28 April 1977 (aged 63) Madrid, Spain
- Cause of death: Myocardial infarction

Military service
- Allegiance: Spanish Republic; Nationalist faction Nationalist Spain; Nazi Germany
- Branch/service: Spanish Army; German Army (Wehrmacht)
- Years of service: 1935–1977
- Rank: Lieutenant general
- Commands: General Military Academy; General Command of Ceuta; VII Military Region; Defence High Command; Board of Joint Chiefs of Staff
- Battles/wars: Spanish Civil War; World War II: Eastern Front

Carlos Fernández Vallespín (13 July 1913 – 28 April 1977) was a Spanish military officer.

== Biography ==
Carlos Fernández Vallespín was born in Ferrol, Galicia on 13 July 1913. He entered the Toledo Infantry Academy in 1935, and participated in the Spanish coup of July 1936 in Madrid at the beginning of the Spanish Civil War, being wounded and taken prisoner by the Republicans. After managing to escape, he participated in various actions within the Nationalist faction. Following the Civil War, he fought on the Eastern Front of World War II, in the ranks of the Blue Division (Spanish: División Azul, German: Blaue Division), or the 250th Infantry Division of the German Wehrmacht, being wounded again.

In 1965 he reached the rank of brigadier general. He served as director of the General Military Academy between 1968 and 1969.

In 1969 he was promoted to major general and was appointed General Commander of Ceuta.

In 1972 he was appointed lieutenant general and Captain General of the VII Military Region, based in Valladolid. In 1974 he was appointed Chief of the Defence High Command (Alto Estado Mayor, AEM), the principal staff body of the Francoist Spanish Armed Forces, in charge of coordination between the general staffs of the three military branches. With the advent of democracy and the restructuring of the Armed Forces, he was appointed President of the newly created Board of Joint Chiefs of Staff (Junta de Jefes de Estado Mayor, JUJEM) in 1977.

Shortly after this last appointment, he died in Madrid of a myocardial infarction, on 28 April 1977.

Military offices
| Preceded by Manuel Díez-Alegría | Chief of the Defence High Command; 15 June 1974 – 28 April 1977 | Succeeded by Felipe Galarza Sánchez |
| Preceded by Position established | President of the Board of Joint Chiefs of Staff; 2 February 1977 – 28 April 1977 | Succeeded by Felipe Galarza Sánchez |
