= List of ambassadors of Spain to Brazil =

Ambassador of Spain to Brazil
- Coat of arms of Spain

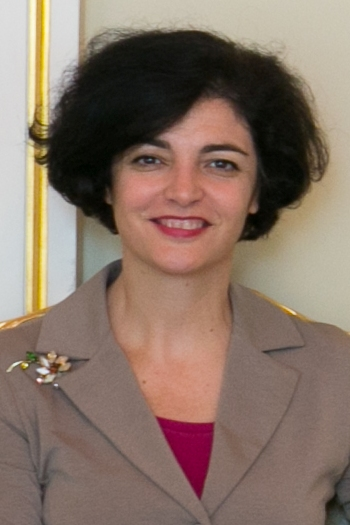
- Incumbent; Consuelo Femenía since 30 June 2026
- Ministry of Foreign Affairs; Secretariat of State for Ibero-America
- Style: The Most Excellent
- Residence: Brasília
- Nominator: The Foreign Minister
- Appointer: The Monarch
- Term length: At the government's pleasure
- Inaugural holder: Vicente Sales Musoles
- Formation: 1933
- Website: Mission of Spain to Brazil

The ambassador of Spain to Brazil is the official representative of the Kingdom of Spain to the Federative Republic of Brazil.

Spain recognized Brazil's independence in 1834 and immediately opened a legation in Rio de Janeiro, which for a long time coordinated diplomatic relations for the entire region. In 1933, during the Second Spanish Republic, foreign minister Claudio Sánchez-Albornoz elevated the rank of the Spanish diplomatic mission in Rio to embassy.

== List of ambassadors to Brazil ==
This list was compiled using the work "History of the Spanish Diplomacy" by the Spanish historian and diplomat Miguel Ángel Ochoa Brun. The work covers up to the year 2000, so the rest is based on appointments published in the Boletín Oficial del Estado.

Name	Rank	Term
José Delavat y Rincón	Chargé d'affaires	1834–1854
Fabricio Potestad	Minister	1855
José Delavat y Rincón	Minister	1855–1856
Manuel Rancés y Villanueva	Minister	1856–1859
Mariano Potestad	Chargé d'affaires a.i.	1859–1860
Juan Blanco del Valle	Minister	1860–1864
Pedro Sorela y Maury	Minister	1864–1865
Juan Blanco del Valle	Minister	1865–1866
Diego Ramón de la Quadra	Minister	1866–1869
Dionisio Roberts y Prendergast	Chargé d'affaires	1869–1874
Manuel Llorente y Vázquez	Chargé d'affaires a.i.	1874–1875
Emilio Muruaga	Minister	1875
Francisco Gargollo	Chargé d'affaires a.i.	1876
Antonio González Estéfani	Chargé d'affaires a.i.	1877
Mariano Potestad	Minister	1877–1883
Luis del Castillo y Triguero	Minister	1883–1888
José Delavat y Arëas	Minister	1888–1891
Luis de Silva-Bazán y Fernández de Córdoba, Count of Pie de Concha	Minister	1891–1892
José Llavería y Hertzberg	Minister	1896–1898
Ricardo Larios y Segura	Minister	1898–1900
Manuel María de Aranguren y Bonet	Minister	1902–1908
Manuel Multedo y Cortina	Minister	1908–1910
Cristóbal Fernández-Vallín y Alfonso	Minister	1910
Manuel García y Jove	Minister	1910–1917
Diego Saavedra y Magdalena	Minister	1917
Antonio Benítez y Fernández	Minister	1917–1929
Alfredo Mariátegui y Carratalá	Minister	1929
Antonio Benítez y Fernández	Minister	1930–1932
Vicente Sales	Minister	1933
Vicente Sales	Ambassador	1933–1936
Teodomiro de Aguilar Salas	Chargé d'affaires	1936
Luis Fernández Clérigo (Note: Representing the Republican government.)	Minister	1938
Manuel García Miranda	Minister	1938–1939
José Cárcel Lasance (Note: Representing the Rebel government.)	Representative	1939
Raimundo Fernández-Cuesta	Ambassador	1939–1942
Pedro García Conde y Menéndez	Ambassador	1942–1946
José Rojas Moreno, Count of Casa Rojas	Ambassador	1946–1952
Pedro de Prat y Soutzo, Marquess of Prat de Nantouillet	Ambassador	1952–1954
Tomás Suñer Ferrer	Ambassador	1954–1960
José Rojas Moreno, Count of Casa Rojas	Ambassador	1960–1962
Jaime Alba Delibes	Ambassador	1963–1967
José Antonio Giménez-Arnau	Ambassador	1967–1969
Emilio Pan de Soraluce y OlMinisters	Ambassador	1969–1972
José Pérez del Arco y Rodríguez	Ambassador	1972–1978
Francisco Javier Vallaure Fernández-Peña	Ambassador	1978–1983
Miguel Ignacio de Aldasoro Sandberg	Ambassador	1983–1988
José Luis Crespo de Vega	Ambassador	1988–1992
Carlos Blasco Villa	Ambassador	1992–1996
César Alba	Ambassador	1996–2001
José Coderch Planas	Ambassador	2001–2004
Ricardo Peidró	Ambassador	2004–2008
Carlos Alonso Zaldívar	Ambassador	2008–2012
Manuel de la Cámara Hermoso	Ambassador	2012–2017
Fernando Villalonga Campos	Ambassador	2017–2018
Fernando García Casas	Ambassador	2018–2022
Mar Fernández-Palacios	Ambassador	2022–2026
Consuelo Femenía	Ambassador	2026–pres.
