= Islero =

Miura bull

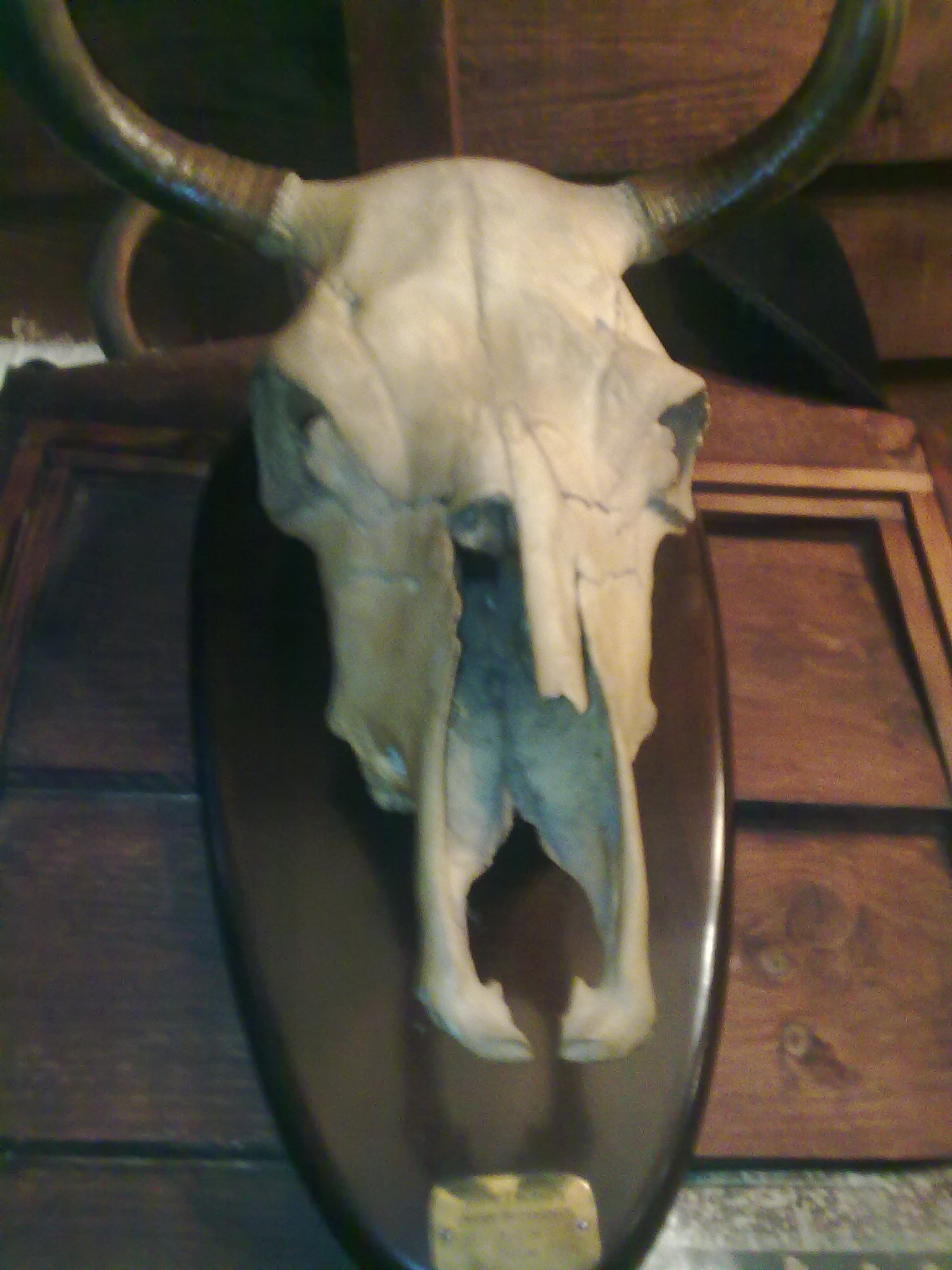
- Skull of Islero, on wall of Restaurante Parrondo, Madrid
- Species: Bos taurus
- Breed: Miura
- Sex: Male
- Born: Seville, Andalusia, Spain
- Nationality: Spain
- Known for: Gored and killed Manolete
- Owner: Eduardo Miura Fernández
- Weight: 495 kg (1091 lb)

Islero was a Miura bull famed for killing the celebrated bullfighter Manolete on August 28, 1947. Bulls from the Miura ranch, located near Seville, Spain, are known for being large and ferocious.

Islero had poor eyesight and tended to chop with his right horn. On the fateful day, he was the fifth bull of the afternoon, and the second for Manolete, at a bullfight in the town of Linares in the province of Jaén, Andalucía, Spain. The bullfighter's manager begged Manolete to finish him off quickly; as the matador reached over the bull's horns, thrusting his estoque (sword) deep up to its hilt, Islero thrust his right horn into Manolete's groin, severing his femoral artery. The bullfighter was rushed to hospital, but died on the operating table later that evening.

Italian automaker Lamborghini named one of its grand tourers "Islero" as part of the company's tradition of naming its cars after Miura bulls and with other bullfighting-related terms.

The Spanish project to build nuclear weapons was named Proyecto Islero.
