= José Luis Arrese =

Spanish politician (1905–1986)

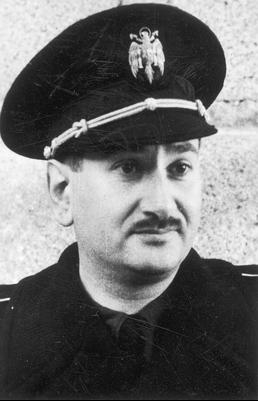
- Arrese circa 1939
- Born: 15 April 1905; Bilbao, Kingdom of Spain
- Died: 6 April 1986 (aged 80); Corella
- Education: Doctorate in architecture
- Occupation: Architect
- Known for: Politician
- Notable work: La Revolucion Social del Nacional Sindicalismo (1940)
- Political party: FET y de las JONS

José Luis Arrese y Marga (15 April 1905 – 6 April 1986) was a leading Spanish politician with both the Falange and its successor movement the FET y de las JONS.

== Early years ==
Arrese was born in Bilbao to a Basque family which was noted for its support of Carlism. He went to Madrid in order to train as an architect, obtaining his doctorate in architecture in 1932. As a student he was a member of the conservative Asociación de Estudiantes Catolicos and was also a founder of the Federacion Espanola de Trabajadores, a workers organisation that focused on anti-communism.

== Falangism ==
It is unclear when Arrese first joined the Falange as sources disagree. Philip Rees states that Arrese was a founder member of the group in 1933 but Wayne H. Bowen states that he did not become a member until 1936. Either way however Arrese associated himself with the camisa vieja tendency, a hardline faction made up of early members of the movement.

At the outbreak of the Spanish Civil War Arrese found himself in the Republican zone and took refuge in the Embassy of Norway before escaping to the Nationalist section in 1937. A close associate of Manuel Hedilla, he backed his ally in his quarrel with Francisco Franco and as a consequence was sentenced to two years imprisonment by a Francoist military tribunal. However his release was promptly arranged by General Gonzalo Queipo de Llano, a Francoist who nonetheless had a good relationship with Arrese. He returned to some influence as jefe provincial of Málaga in December 1937 and helped to ensure the development of low cost housing and efficient fuel provision in the region. He was a strong supporter of the national syndicalism that formed part of original Falangist ideology and published a book in 1940 entitled La Revolucion Social del Nacional Sindicalismo.

== Nazism ==
An enthusiastic supporter of Nazism, Arrese was one of the first to propose the creation of the Blue Division to support the Nazi war effort. On 20 May 1941 in an attempt to appeal to Adolf Hitler, who was still enjoying much success in World War II at the time, Arrese was one of three extremists appointed to the cabinet by Francisco Franco, in this case to the position of General Secretary of the Movement. The appointment was a shrewd one by Franco as, although Arrese was identified with the Old Shirt tendency, he also had a strong personal loyalty to El Caudillo. Arrese retained his strong interest in Nazism and in January 1943 he made a visit to Nazi Germany where he met with Adolf Hitler and Joachim von Ribbentrop and inspected German aircraft and building projects. This was to be the last formal contact between Spain and Germany before the fall of Hitler. Despite his enthusiasm for the Nazis Arrese did intimate to Hitler that he felt there was a wide gap between the two ideologically as Arrese was a lifelong devout member of the Roman Catholic Church. On 20 July 1945 Arrese was removed from his position, his appointment no longer politically expedient, and indeed the role was left symbolically vacant in an attempt to disassociate Francoist Spain from fascism.

== Post-war ==
He enjoyed a return of sorts in 1956 when Franco dismissed Raimundo Fernández-Cuesta as the leader of the paramilitary Blue Shirts, although in truth the role had lost much of its importance as both the Army and the Monarchists had grown in power at the expense of the traditional Falangists. In attempt to regain control for the Falangists he approached Franco the following year with a new draft constitution that would enshrine totalitarianism in Spain and threatened to resign if it was denied. Franco however rejected the move, endorsing a much more pro-monarchy document and, in a cabinet reshuffle, handing Arrese the humiliation of the very minor portfolio of Minister of Housing. His aim was to create a class of home owners, leaving renting and delayed owning as an exception. By 1960 Arrese had disappeared from any governmental role.

Disillusioned by the development of post-war Spain he made a speech in 1958 on the anniversary of the death of José Antonio Primo de Rivera in which he stated "you [Primo de Rivera] cannot be satisfied with this mediocre, sensual life". He left his role as Minister of Housing in 1960 after being refused an increase in departmental social housing budget. He retired from public life, eventually settling in Corella where he died in 1986.

== Bibliography ==
- Bowen, Wayne H. (2000). Spaniards and Nazi Germany: Collaboration in the New Order. University of Missouri Press.
- Bowen, Wayne H. (2006). Spain During World War II. University of Missouri Press.

Preceded by Agustín Muñoz Grandes	General Secretary of the Movement; 1941-1945	Succeeded by Raimundo Fernández-Cuesta
Preceded by Raimundo Fernández-Cuesta	General Secretary of the Movement; 1956-1957	Succeeded by José Solís Ruiz
