= List of ambassadors of Spain to the Netherlands =

Coordinates: 52.083702°N 4.313139°E

Ambassador of Spain to the Netherlands
- Coat of arms of Spain

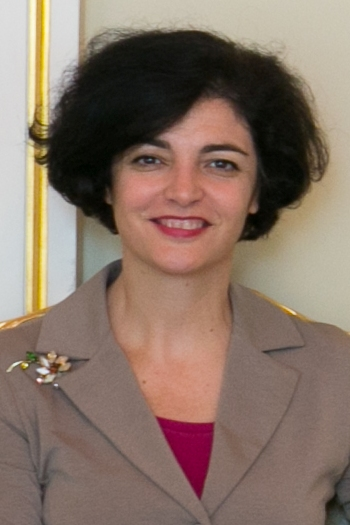
- Incumbent; Cecilia Robles Cartes since June 30, 2026
- Ministry of Foreign Affairs; Secretariat of State for the European Union
- Style: The Most Excellent
- Residence: The Hague
- Nominator: The Foreign Minister
- Appointer: The Monarch
- Term length: At the government's pleasure
- Inaugural holder: Antoine Brun, baron d'Aspremont
- Formation: 1649
- Website: Mission of Spain to the Netherlands

The ambassador of Spain to the Netherlands is the official representative of the Kingdom of Spain to the Kingdom of the Netherlands. It is also accredited to the Organisation for the Prohibition of Chemical Weapons.

In the past, this ambassador also served as ambassador to Luxembourg (1891–1922), Nassau (1687) and the Austrian Netherlands (1726–1746). It also represented Spain in the Congress of Cologne (1674) during the Franco-Dutch War.

== History ==
The Netherlands were part of the Spanish Monarchy until 1581, during the Dutch Revolt, when a number of provinces issued the Act of Abjuration repudiating Philip II of Spain. In 1609, on concluding the Twelve Years' Truce, Philip III of Spain agreed to deal with the Dutch Republic "as though" it were sovereign. Full mutual recognition and the accreditation of ordinary ambassadors came after the Peace of Münster, during the reign of Philip IV of Spain.

Diplomatic accreditation	Ambassador	Observations	Head of government in Spain	Head of government in the Netherlands	Term end
1643	Miguel de Salamanca y Salamanca	Envoy	Philip IV of Spain	Frederick Henry, Prince of Orange	1645
1645	Francisco Galarreta	Diplomatic agent	Philip IV of Spain	Frederick Henry, Prince of Orange	1645
1648	Philippe Le Roy	Envoy	Philip IV of Spain	William II, Prince of Orange	1648
January 1, 1649	Antoine Brun d'Aspremont	In 1649 he became the king's first resident ambassador in the newly recognised Dutch Republic. He took up residence in The Hague in mid 1649, his first official despatch as ambassador being dated 29 June 1649. In 1650 he concluded a naval treaty with the Dutch on behalf of the king.	Philip IV of Spain	William II, Prince of Orange	1654
January 1655	Esteban de Gamarra y Contreras		Philip IV of Spain	William III of England	June 1671
January 1, 1665	Antonio de Tovar y Paz		Charles II of Spain	William III of England	
January 1, 1671	Manuel Francisco de Lira Castillo	Spanish Ambassador to The Hague.	Charles II of Spain	William III of England	1678
1678	Baltasar de Fuenmayor, Marquess of Castel-Moncayo	Spanish Ambassador to The Hague.	Charles II of Spain	William III of England	1685
May 5, 1687	Manuel Coloma, marqués de Canales		Charles II of Spain	William III of England	1691
1691	Francisco Bernardo de Quirós		Charles II of Spain	William III of England	1700
1700	Vacant	War of the Spanish Succession	Philip V of Spain	John William Friso	1716
May 8, 1716	Lorenzo Verzuso Beretti Landi		Philip V of Spain	William IV, Prince of Orange	January 8, 1721
January 8, 1721	Isidro Casado de Acevedo y Rosales		Philip V of Spain	William IV, Prince of Orange	January 1, 1724
January 1, 1724	Vicente Bacallar y Sanna		Louis I of Spain	William IV, Prince of Orange	June 11, 1726
January 1, 1762	Jerónimo Grimaldi, 1st Duke of Grimaldi		Charles III of Spain	William V, Prince of Orange	January 1, 1762
1815	José María Pando y Remírez de Laredo	Chargé d'affaires	Ferdinand VII of Spain	William I of the Netherlands	1818
1815	Miguel Ricardo de Álava	Ambassador	Ferdinand VII of Spain	William I of the Netherlands	1822
December 11, 1917	Santiago Méndez de Vigo y Méndez de Vigo		Alfonso XIII of Spain	Pieter Cort van der Linden	April 30, 1925
January 1, 1938	José María Semprún Gurrea	Last ambassador of the Second Spanish Republic	Juan Negrín	Hendrikus Colijn	January 1, 1938
April 16, 1985	Fernando Schwartz		Felipe González	Ruud Lubbers	July 24, 1988
February 5, 1988	Manuel María Sassot Cañadas		Felipe González	Ruud Lubbers	
May 21, 1991	Antonio José Fournier Bermejo		Felipe González	Ruud Lubbers	
May 6, 1994	Rafael Pastor Ridruejo		Felipe González	Wim Kok	August 5, 1995
August 5, 1995	Josep Maria Pons Irazazábal		Felipe González	Wim Kok	February 2, 2001
February 2, 2001	Carlos Manuel de Benavides y Salas	(*January 15, 1939)	José María Aznar	Wim Kok	June 26, 2004
June 26, 2004	Alfonso Dastis		José Luis Rodríguez Zapatero	Jan Peter Balkenende	August 31, 2007
August 31, 2007	Juan Prat Y Coll		José Luis Rodríguez Zapatero	Jan Peter Balkenende	January 7, 2011
July 7, 2011	Francisco Javier Vallaure de Acha		José Luis Rodríguez Zapatero	Mark Rutte	
February 3, 2014	Fernando Arias González		Mariano Rajoy	Mark Rutte	
August 24, 2018	María Jesús Alonso Jiménez		Pedro Sánchez	Mark Rutte	December 28, 2021
December 28, 2021	Consuelo Femenía Guardiola		Pedro Sánchez	Mark Rutte	June 30, 2026
June 30, 2026	Cecilia Robles Cartes		Pedro Sánchez	Rob Jetten	
