= Raimundo Fernández-Cuesta =

Spanish politician (1896–1992)

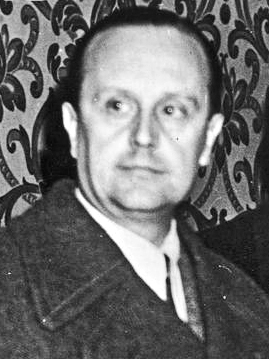

Secretary-General of FET y de las JONS
- In office 4 December 1937 – 9 August 1939

Minister of Agriculture

President of the Council of State

Personal details
- Born: 5 October 1896 Madrid, Spain
- Died: July 9, 1992 (aged 95) Madrid, Spain
- Party: FET y de las JONS
- Spouse(s): María del Carmen Casanueva y Navarro, 3rd Countess of San Rodrigo (died 1976)
- Education: Complutense University of Madrid

Raimundo Fernández-Cuesta y Merelo, Count of San Rodrigo (5 October 1896, Madrid – 9 July 1992, Madrid) was a leading Spanish politician with both the Falange and its successor movement the Spanish Traditionalist Phalanx of the Assemblies of National-Syndicalist Offensive.

== Early life ==
A native of Madrid, Fernández-Cuesta studied at the local university, where he gained a law degree. He was a close friend of José Antonio Primo de Rivera from childhood.

An early member of the Falange, which he joined in 1933, he served as the movement's first secretary and garnered a reputation as one of the new group's most effective public speakers. He was a candidate for the Falange at the 1936 election, although he was not elected.

== Spanish Civil War ==
Fernández-Cuesta was imprisoned upon the outbreak of the Spanish Civil War by Republicans and, although he escaped twice, was recaptured on both occasions. He was released from captivity in October 1937 when he was involved in a prisoner swap with Justino de Azcárate, who was held by the Nationalists. Soon after his release he was appointed Secretary general of the FET y de las JONS although he did not prove talented as a political organiser and was replaced in the role by Agustín Muñoz Grandes in 1939. His appointment as leader was largely intended to keep onside Falangists who feared the influence of both the Army and monarchism on Franco, but the role proved to have little power since real influence over Franco was instead to lie with Ramón Serrano Súñer.

Within this early Burgos-based government of Francisco Franco, he also fulfilled the role of Agriculture Minister. This too however proved to be largely a failed endeavour.

== Removal ==
Such was the influence of Súñer that, after the Spanish Civil War, he engineered the effective exile of his rival Fernández-Cuesta, who was appointed Spanish ambassador first to Brazil (1940–1942) and then to Italy (1942–1945). Alongside this, Fernández-Cuesta's reputation was damaged by his failure in the Agriculture portfolio, with Spain facing famine in the 1940s largely as a consequence of the failed policies he had previously adopted in the role. Nevertheless, his personal loyalty to Franco was never less than absolute, a fact that ensured he would never be fully excluded from positions of influence.

== Return to politics ==
Fernández-Cuesta was effectively absent from the frontline of Spanish politics until 1945 when he was appointed Minister of Justice. As part of his remit he oversaw a liberalisation of Spain's treatment of dissidents designed to win the regime support from NATO, including announcing in December 1949 plans to release 13,000 political prisoners (although in fact only 3,000 were ultimately released under the scheme). He was moved in 1951 to the post of General Secretary of the Movement and oversaw a return to much more draconian ways as unrest over rising unemployment repression under Fernández-Cuesta's direction. He lost this position in early 1956 after Franco came under pressure by leading figures in the Army to remove him following a riot at the University of Madrid in which it was said that the Falangist Frente de Juventudes had acted too heavy-handedly in battling students seeking to organise their own syndicate outside of the official government body. His position was however filled by his ally José Luis de Arrese as Franco continued to seek a balance between the different wings of his movement within the cabinet.

Effectively sidelined, Fernández-Cuesta became loosely associated with extreme rightists such as General Iniesta Cano and Blas Piñar. Removed from the political front-line once again, he nonetheless remained a member of the Cortes Españolas he became recognised as one of the most hard-line and reactionary of the old clique of Franco loyalists who continued to occupy the back benches of the parliament. He was especially critical of the gradual liberalisation that began to creep in during the early 1970s as an increasingly frail Franco began to exercise less day to day power.

== After Franco ==
After Franco's death he re-founded the Falange Española de las JONS, a nostalgic group that failed to make any headway in democratic Spain. Despite leading his own party he was allowed to simultaneously hold membership of Blas Piñar's Fuerza Nueva, with the two parties running a joint campaign in the 1977 election. The groups managed only 0.21% of the vote however.

Fernández-Cuesta retired from politics in February 1983, with Diego Márquez Horrillo succeeding him as Falange Española de las JONS leader. He published his memoirs, Testimonio, Recuerdos y Reflexiones, in 1985.

Preceded by new post	General Secretary of the Movement; 1938-1939	Succeeded by Agustín Muñoz Grandes
Preceded by José Luis de Arrese	General Secretary of the Movement; 1948-1956	Succeeded by José Luis de Arrese
