= Board of Joint Chiefs of Staff =

Highest joint staff organization in the Spanish Armed Forces between 1977 and 2005

- Junta de Jefes de Estado Mayor
- Emblem
- Active: 1977–2005
- Country: Spain
- Branch: Armed forces
- Type: Military staff
- Part of: Spanish Armed Forces
- Headquarters: Madrid

Commanders
- First President: Lieutenant General Carlos Fernández Vallespín
- Last President: Lieutenant General Álvaro de Lacalle Leloup

Insignia
- Abbreviation: JUJEM

The Board of Joint Chiefs of Staff (Spanish: Junta de Jefes de Estado Mayor, JUJEM) was the highest joint military command body of the Spanish Armed Forces that operated between 1977 and 2005. The Board, subject to the political dependence of the Prime Minister, constituted the highest collegiate body of the chain of military command of Army, the Navy and the Air Force. The Board consisted of a president, selected from among lieutenant generals or admirals of the three branches of the Armed Forces, their chiefs of staff (Army, Navy and the Air Force) and a secretary. The president had to belong to the Group of Arms Command or Group "A" and was also chief of the Defence High Command, until the dissolution of this body in 1980. The Board also had a General Headquarters, created in 1980 as a result of the dissolution of the Defence High Command, where the organs of aid to the command were integrated. Of the General Headquarters of the JUJEM they depended:

- The Technical General Secretariat of the General Headquarters.
- The Joint Staff of the Board, constituted in a balanced way by members of each of the three branches of the Armed Forces. The command of the Board fell to a divisional general or vice admiral of the same scale and group as the members of the Board, at the proposal of the same.
- The Higher Center for National Defence Studies.
- The Command of the General Headquarters.
- Legal Service.

After its dissolution, the functions of the Board were assumed by the current Defence Staff.

== Functions ==
The most important functions entrusted to the Board of Joint Chiefs of Staff were the following:

- Provide technical advice in the preparation of the military policy to be formulated by the National Defence Board.
- Formulate and propose, for approval by the Government, the Joint Strategic Plan, determining, within it, the joint objective of the Force.
- Exercise the strategic direction of said Plan and coordinate the plans of the three branches of the Armed Forces derived from it.
- Establish the doctrine of Unified Action and, where appropriate, the doctrine of Combined Action with the Armies of other countries.
- Prepare combined plans with armies of other nations, when said plans were joint.
- Propose to the Prime Minister the creation of the unified and specified commands, as well as the persons who should exercise it and who, under the direct dependency of the Joint Chiefs of Staff, were necessary for the execution of the Joint Strategic Plan, defining mission, means and areas of action.
- Promote, in coordination with the National Mobilization Service, the preparation of integrated plans for general mobilization.

== List of presidents of the Board of Joint Chiefs of Staff ==
After 1984, the Chairman of the Joint Chiefs of Staff was the Chief of the Defence Staff.

† denotes people who died in office.

| No. | Portrait | President of the JUJEM | Took office | Left office | Time in office | Defence branch | Commander-in-Chief | Ref. |
|---|---|---|---|---|---|---|---|---|
| 1 | Carlos Fernández Vallespín | Lieutenant General; Carlos Fernández Vallespín (1913–1977) (Note: Simultaneously served as Chief of the Defence High Command) | 2 February 1977 | 28 April 1977 † | 85 days | Army | Juan Carlos I | |
| 2 | Felipe Galarza Sánchez | Lieutenant General; Felipe Galarza Sánchez (1913–1994) | 23 July 1977 | 12 September 1978 | 1 year, 51 days | Air Force | Juan Carlos I | |
| 3 | Ignacio Alfaro Arregui | Lieutenant General; Ignacio Alfaro Arregui (1918–2000) (Note: Simultaneously served as Chief of the Defence High Command until 19 May 1980) | 12 September 1978 | 15 January 1982 | 3 years, 125 days | Air Force | Juan Carlos I | |
| 4 | Álvaro de Lacalle Leloup | Lieutenant General; Álvaro de Lacalle Leloup (1918–2004) | 15 January 1982 | 9 January 1984 | 1 year, 359 days | Army | Juan Carlos I | |

== See also ==
- Defence High Command
- Defence Staff (Spain)
  - Chief of the Defence Staff (Spain)
- Spanish Armed Forces

== Sources and references ==
The content of this article incorporates material published in the Boletín Oficial del Estado, which is in the public domain in accordance with the provisions of Article 13 of the Spanish Intellectual Property Law.

- (in Spanish) Real Decreto-ley 11/1977, de 8 de febrero, por el que se institucionaliza la Junta de Jefes de Estado Mayor y se regulan sus atribuciones, funciones y responsabilidades. The Spanish Official Gazette núm. 34, de 9 de febrero de 1977, página 3135.
- (in Spanish) Real Decreto 1125/1980, de 13 de junio, por el que se crea el Cuartel General de la Junta de Jefes de Estado Mayor. The Spanish Official Gazette núm. 143, de 14 de junio de 1980, página 13287.
