= Ignacio Alfaro Arregui =

Spanish military officer

General Ignacio Alfaro Arregui

President of the Board of Joint Chiefs of Staff
- In office 12 September 1978 – 15 January 1982
- Monarch: Juan Carlos I
- Preceded by: Felipe Galarza Sánchez
- Succeeded by: Álvaro de Lacalle Leloup

Chief of the Defence High Command
- In office 12 September 1978 – 19 May 1980
- Monarch: Juan Carlos I
- Preceded by: Felipe Galarza Sánchez
- Succeeded by: Position abolished

Personal details
- Born: Ignacio Alfaro Arregui; 3 May 1918 Burgos, Kingdom of Spain
- Died: 24 July 2000 (aged 82) Burgos, Spain

Military service
- Branch/service: Spanish Air and Space Force
- Rank: Lieutenant general

Ignacio Alfaro Arregui (3 May 1918 – 24 July 2000) was a Spanish military officer who served as Chief of the Defence High Command (Alto Estado Mayor, AEM) between 1978 and 1980, and as President of the Board of Joint Chiefs of Staff (Junta de Jefes de Estado Mayor, JUJEM) between 1978 and 1982. The offices he held made him chief of staff of the Spanish Armed Forces at the time.

Military offices
Preceded by Felipe Galarza Sánchez	Chief of the Defence High Command; 12 September 1978 – 19 May 1980	Succeeded by Position abolished
Preceded by Felipe Galarza Sánchez	President of the Board of Joint Chiefs of Staff; 12 September 1978 – 15 January 1982	Succeeded by Álvaro de Lacalle Leloup
