= Consuelo Femenía =

Spanish diplomat and ambassador (born 1965)

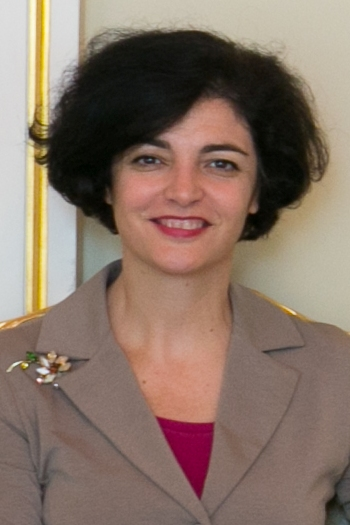
Consuelo Femenía

María Consuelo Femenía Guardiola (Jávea, June 17, 1965) is a Spanish diplomat. Currently, she is posted as ambassador to Brazil.

She has a master's degree in law from the University of Valencia. She entered the Spanish Diplomatic Service in 1992.

She was posted at the Spanish embassies in Russia, Nicaragua and the Netherlands. She was deputy representative of Spain before the Organisation for the Prohibition of Chemical Weapons from 1999 to 2004. She worked as the Assistant Director for Cultural and Scientific Affairs and Director for Development Aid in charge of all Spanish aid for Latin America and the Caribbean. Afterwards she also worked as Ambassador-at-Large for the Arms Trade Treaty. She was posted as Ambassador of Spain to Latvia from 2010 to 2014. From 2015 to 2018 she was in charge of the development of the digital diplomacy network in the Ministry of Foreign Affairs and Cooperation.

From 2018 to 2021, she served as ambassador to Malta and from 2021 to 2026, to the Netherlands. In June 2026, she was appointed ambassador to Brazil.

== Publications ==
- "En la era del diplomático anfibio" - The Diplomat, 24 octubre, 2016
- "Digital diplomacy as a team work tester"
- "La diplomacia española ante el reto digital" - Reference book for Spanish MFA

== Awards ==
- "Best Team Leader of the Year #2" - The State of Digital Diplomacy 2016
