= Francisco Martín-Moreno =

Spanish military officer

General Francisco Martín-Moreno
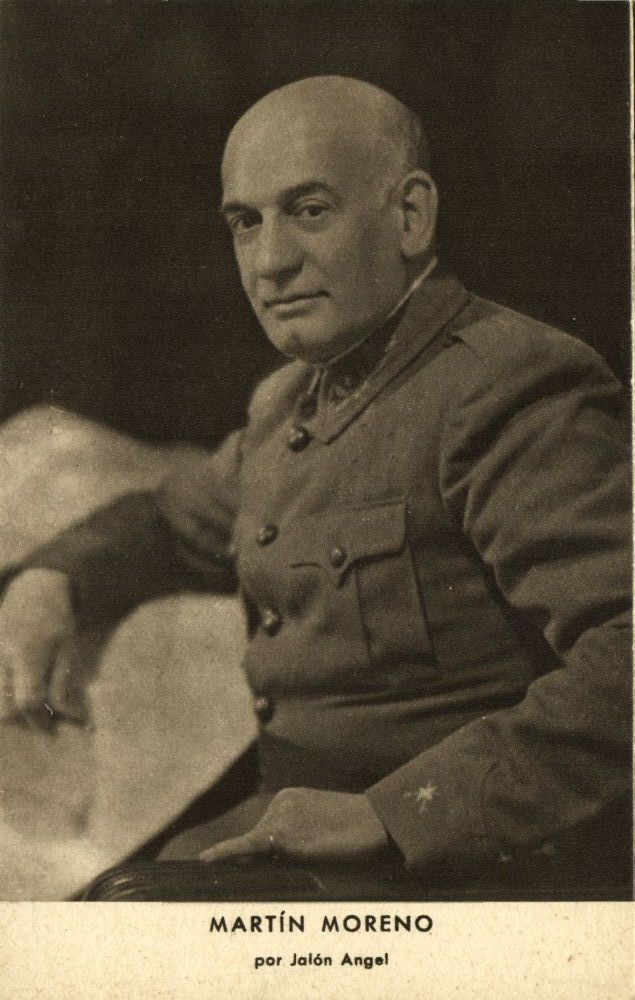

Chief of the Defence High Command
- In office 30 July 1940 – 23 April 1941
- Leader: Francisco Franco
- Preceded by: Juan Vigón
- Succeeded by: Fidel Dávila Arrondo

Personal details
- Born: Francisco Martín-Moreno; 1880 Kingdom of Spain
- Died: 23 April 1941 (aged 60–61) Francoist Spain

Military service
- Branch/service: Spanish Army
- Rank: Divisional general
- Battles/wars: Spanish Civil War

Francisco Martín-Moreno, 1st Count of Martín Moreno (1880 – 23 April 1941) was a Spanish military officer who served as Chief of the Defence High Command (Alto Estado Mayor, AEM) between 1940 and 1941, i.e., chief of staff of the Spanish Armed Forces during the Francoist dictatorship.

In 1961, Francisco Franco, as Caudillo of the re-established Kingdom of Spain, posthumously granted Martín-Moreno the title of Count of Martín Moreno. The title was immediately assumed by his son, Don Francisco José Martín-Moreno y González. It was abolished in October 2022, under the purview of the Democratic Memory Law.

Military offices
Preceded by Juan Vigón	Chief of the Defence High Command; 30 July 1940 – 23 April 1941	Succeeded by Fidel Dávila Arrondo
Spanish nobility
New creation	Count of Martín Moreno; 1961 (posthumous)	Succeeded by Francisco José Martín-Moreno y González
