= Felipe Galarza Sánchez =

Spanish military officer

General Felipe Galarza Sánchez

President of the Board of Joint Chiefs of Staff
- In office 23 July 1977 – 12 September 1978
- Monarch: Juan Carlos I
- Preceded by: Carlos Fernández Vallespín
- Succeeded by: Ignacio Alfaro Arregui

Chief of the Defence High Command
- In office 23 July 1977 – 12 September 1978
- Monarch: Juan Carlos I
- Preceded by: Carlos Fernández Vallespín
- Succeeded by: Ignacio Alfaro Arregui

Personal details
- Born: Felipe Galarza Sánchez; 3 March 1913 Gijón, Asturias, Kingdom of Spain
- Died: 3 May 1994 (aged 81) Spain

Military service
- Branch/service: Spanish Air and Space Force
- Rank: Lieutenant general

Felipe Galarza Sánchez (3 March 1913 – 3 May 1994) was a Spanish military officer who served as Chief of the Defence High Command (Alto Estado Mayor, AEM), and as President of the Board of Joint Chiefs of Staff (Junta de Jefes de Estado Mayor, JUJEM) between 1977 and 1978. The offices he held made him chief of staff of the Spanish Armed Forces at the time.

Military offices
Preceded by Carlos Fernández Vallespín	Chief of the Defence High Command; 23 July 1977 – 12 September 1978	Succeeded by Ignacio Alfaro Arregui
Preceded by Carlos Fernández Vallespín	President of the Board of Joint Chiefs of Staff; 23 July 1977 – 12 September 1978	Succeeded by Ignacio Alfaro Arregui
