= Álvaro de Lacalle Leloup =

Spanish military officer

General Álvaro de Lacalle Leloup
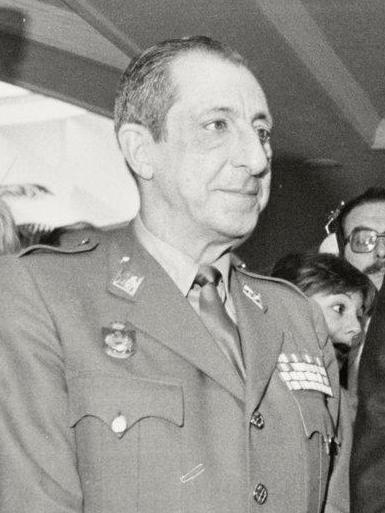
- Álvaro de Lacalle Leloup in 1982

President of the Board of Joint Chiefs of Staff
- In office 15 January 1982 – 9 January 1984
- Monarch: Juan Carlos I
- Preceded by: Ignacio Alfaro Arregui
- Succeeded by: Ángel Liberal Lucini (as Chief of the Defence Staff)

Personal details
- Born: Álvaro de Lacalle Leloup; 29 October 1918 Haro, Logroño (now La Rioja), Kingdom of Spain
- Died: 1 September 2004 (aged 85) Madrid, Spain

Military service
- Allegiance: Nationalist Spain
- Branch/service: Spanish Army
- Rank: Lieutenant general
- Battles/wars: Spanish Civil War; World War II: Eastern Front

Álvaro de Lacalle Leloup (29 October 1918 – 1 September 2004) was a Spanish military officer who served as President of the Board of Joint Chiefs of Staff (Junta de Jefes de Estado Mayor, JUJEM) between 1982 and 1984, i.e., chief of staff of the Spanish Armed Forces at the time.

During the Spanish Civil War, Lacalle was a Carlist Requeté combatant for the Nationalist faction. During World War II, he was one of the volunteers of the so-called Blue Division (Spanish: División Azul, German: Blaue Division), or the 250th Infantry Division of the Wehrmacht; the division was sent to the Eastern Front by the Francoist regime to fight alongside Nazi Germany against the Soviet Union.

== Awards ==
- Grand Cross (with White Decoration) of Naval Merit (1962)
- Grand Cross of the Royal and Military Order of Saint Hermenegild (1975)
- Grand Cross of the Order of Isabella the Catholic (1984)
- Grand Cross of the Military Order of St. Gregory the Great (1984)

Military offices
Preceded by Ignacio Alfaro Arregui	President of the Board of Joint Chiefs of Staff; 15 January 1982 – 9 January 1984	Succeeded by Ángel Liberal Lucini as Chief of the Defence Staff
