= Defence High Command =

Highest staff organization in the Spanish Armed Forces between 1939 and 1980

- Alto Estado Mayor
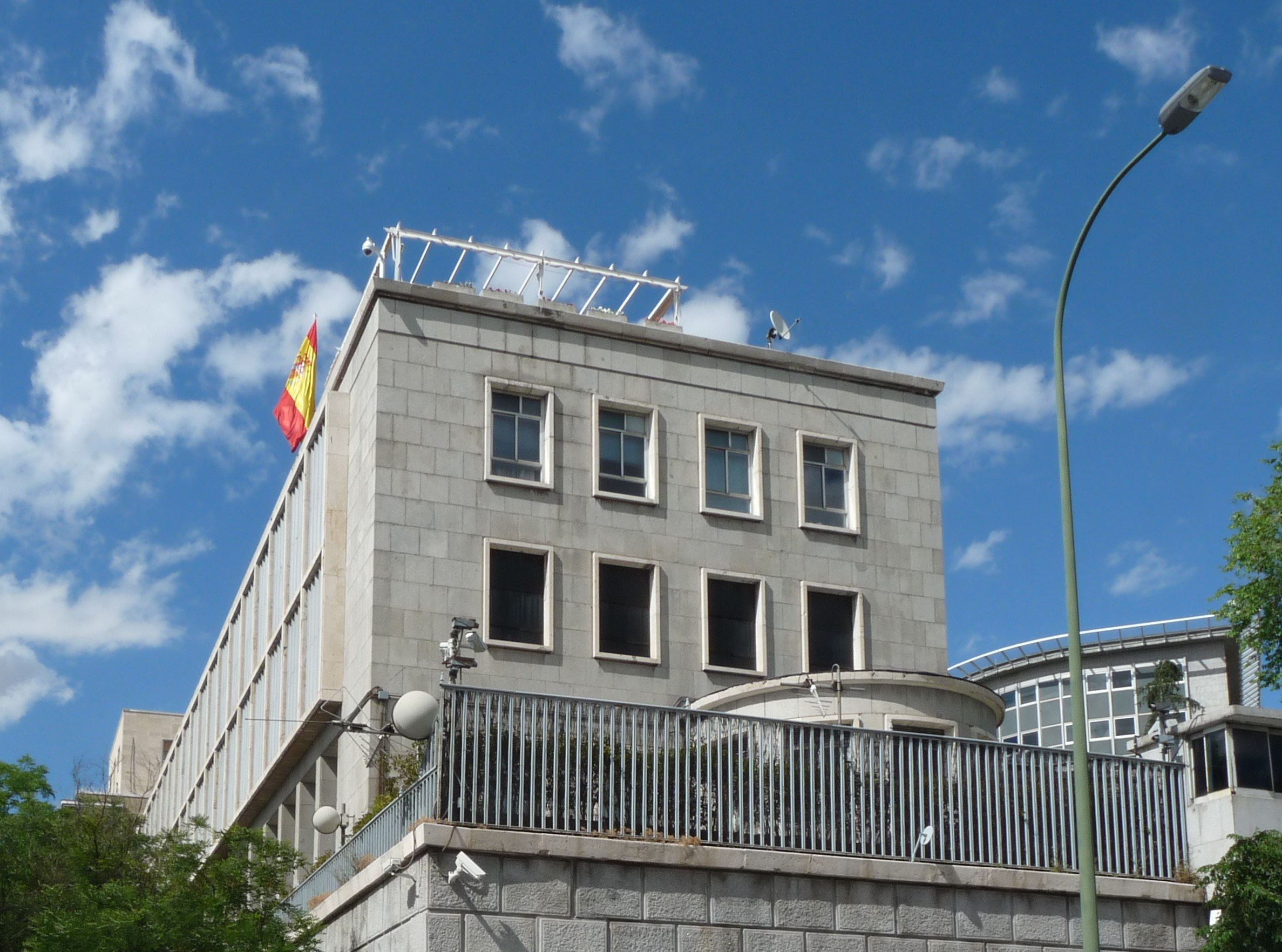
- Building of the AEM, on La Castellana
- Active: 1939–1980
- Country: Spain
- Branch: Armed forces
- Type: Military staff
- Part of: Spanish Armed Forces
- Headquarters: Madrid

Commanders
- First Chief: Brigadier General Juan Vigón Suerodíaz
- Last Chief: Lieutenant General Ignacio Alfaro Arregui

Insignia
- Abbreviation: AEM
- Emblem (until 1975)

- Emblem (1975–1980)

The Defence High Command (Spanish: Alto Estado Mayor, AEM) was the principal staff body of the Spanish Armed Forces during the Francoist regime and the transition to democracy. It operated between 1939 and 1980, and was in charge of coordination between the staffs of the three branches of the Armed Forces (Army, Navy and the Air Force).

== History ==
The AEM was created on 30 August 1939 with the objective of having a "body of coordination, study and information, which would provide to the supreme command the elements of suitable judgment for the orientation of its designs". In this way the Defence High Command is constituted with the following tasks:

- Submit to the authority studies and proposals for the management of national energies so that in case of war they were insured to the maximum extent their evolution and functioning in autarkic regime.
- Prepare the study of the resolutions that proceed in order to the weighting of organic media between the Army, Navy and the Air Force.
- Study and propose the general lines of the permanent organizations that should constitute bases of combined operations of the aforementioned forces.
- Study and propose directives and plans for their joint action in case of war.
- Provide the supreme command with the necessary information for the appreciation of the military and economic potential of other countries.

For this it was necessary on the one hand the appointment of a General-Chief who would be a member and secretary of the National Defense Junta, and on the other hand the creation of a secretariat and three sections: a military, an economic and an informational.

On 5 February 1944, the need to act against foreign intelligence services within Spain was raised. That is why a new military intelligence agency began operating, the so-called "Third Information Section of the Defence High Command" (SIAEM). However, due to problems of coordination between the various counterintelligence mechanisms of the time, it was decided in 1945 to divide the powers: the Defence High Command would be in charge of espionage and counterintelligence of military character both inside and outside the country, while the Ministry of the Interior would be in charge of the internal security of the country, and the rest of the ministries would collect the general information according to their needs.

After the death of Franco in 1975, the administrative structure of the Armed Forces was reorganized. The AEM disappeared in 1980 when all its functions were taken over by the Board of Joint Chiefs of Staff (JUJEM), which was succeeded in 1984 by the Defence Staff (EMAD).

== List of chiefs of the Defence High Command ==
† denotes people who died in office.

No.	Portrait	Chief of the AEM	Took office	Left office	Time in office	Defence branch	Commander-in-Chief	Ref.
1	Juan Vigón	Brigadier General; Juan Vigón (1880–1955)	30 August 1939	27 June 1940	302 days	Army	Francisco Franco	
2	Francisco Martín-Moreno	Divisional General; Francisco Martín-Moreno (1880–1941)	30 July 1940	23 April 1941 †	267 days	Army	Francisco Franco	
3	Fidel Dávila Arrondo	Lieutenant General; Fidel Dávila Arrondo (1878–1962)	5 May 1941	20 July 1945	4 years, 76 days	Army	Francisco Franco	
4	Luis Orgaz Yoldi	Lieutenant General; Luis Orgaz Yoldi (1881–1946)	19 October 1945	31 January 1946 †	104 days	Army	Francisco Franco	
(1)	Juan Vigón	Lieutenant General; Juan Vigón (1880–1955)	15 February 1946	25 May 1955 †	9 years, 99 days	Army	Francisco Franco	
5	Carlos Asensio Cabanillas	Lieutenant General; Carlos Asensio Cabanillas (1896–1970)	3 June 1955	6 June 1958	3 years, 3 days	Army	Francisco Franco	
6	Agustín Muñoz Grandes	Captain General; Agustín Muñoz Grandes (1896–1970) (Note: Simultaneously served as the Deputy Prime Minister of Spain from 1962 to 1967)	6 June 1958	11 July 1970 †	12 years, 35 days	Army	Francisco Franco	
7	Manuel Díez-Alegría	Lieutenant General; Manuel Díez-Alegría (1906–1987)	23 July 1970	14 June 1974	3 years, 326 days	Army	Francisco Franco	
8	Carlos Fernández Vallespín	Lieutenant General; Carlos Fernández Vallespín (1913–1977) (Note: Simultaneously served as President of the Board of Joint Chiefs of Staff from 2 February 1977)	15 June 1974	28 April 1977 †	2 years, 317 days	Army	Francisco Franco; Juan Carlos I	
9	Felipe Galarza Sánchez	Lieutenant General; Felipe Galarza Sánchez (1913–1994) (Note: Simultaneously served as President of the Board of Joint Chiefs of Staff)	23 July 1977	12 September 1978	1 year, 51 days	Air Force	Juan Carlos I	
10	Ignacio Alfaro Arregui	Lieutenant General; Ignacio Alfaro Arregui (1918–2000)	12 September 1978	19 May 1980	1 year, 250 days	Air Force	Juan Carlos I	

== See also ==
- Board of Joint Chiefs of Staff
- Defence Staff (Spain)
  - Chief of the Defence Staff (Spain)
- Spanish Armed Forces during the period of Francoism
- Ministry of the Army
- Ministry of the Navy (Spain)
- Ministry of the Air (Spain)
