= 1959 visit by Dwight D. Eisenhower to Spain =

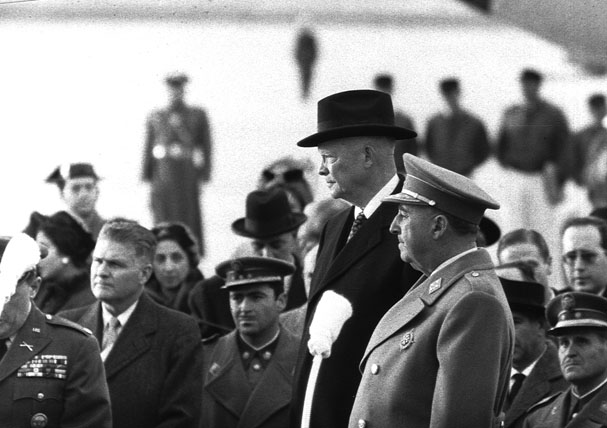
U.S. president Eisenhower and Spanish dictator Francisco Franco at the Torrejón Air Base in December 1959

The visit of U.S. President Dwight D. Eisenhower to Spain on 21 December 1959 was an important moment for the Franco regime to symbolically consolidate its exit from international ostracism during early Francoism.

== History ==
Invited by the Spanish Minister of Foreign Affairs Fernando Castiella, Eisenhower accepted the invitation in the fall. The visit was the first by a United States president to Spain and symbolized the definitive rehabilitation of Francisco Franco after years of ostracism and his acceptance as a U.S. ally.

Eisenhower landed around 4:30 p.m. on 21 December at the Torrejón Air Base, near Madrid, where he was received by the dictator. Organized as a large social event, the trip between the base and Madrid was made in three cars. The two heads of state were cheered by nearly one million people, in a sort of carnival-like parade; Eisenhower and Franco drove through the main streets of the Spanish capital in an open car.

Eisenhower's stop in Spain was not very long: the US president left Spain at 10:45 a.m. the following day. The visit, which was one of Eisenhower's stops on a tour during the latter part of his administration to consolidate U.S. ties with countries outside the communist orbit and with swing countries, was the highest point reached by Franco in international politics.

In the following years, U.S. presidents Richard Nixon (2 – 3 October 1970) and Gerald Ford (31 May – 1 June 1975) visited Franco in Spain, both were Republicans, no Democrat POTUS visited Franco.

== Bibliography ==
- Delgado, Lorenzo (2003). "¿El "amigo americano"?: España y Estados Unidos durante el franquismo". Studia historica. Historia contemporánea. 21. Salamanca: Ediciones Universidad de Salamanca: 231–276. ISSN 0213-2087.
- Deltell Escolar, Luis (2008). "Bienvenido Mister Ike". In Camarero, Gloria (ed.). I Congreso Internacional de Historia y Cine (1, 2007, Getafe). Getafe: Universidad Carlos III de Madrid. ISBN 978-84-691-0824-6.
- Gómez-García, Salvador; Navarro-Sierra, Nuria (2014). "Las voces de un dictador. La figura de Franco desde los micrófonos de Radio Nacional de España (1937-1959)". Palabra Clave. 17 (1). ISSN 0122-8285.
- Martín Alarcón, Julio (8 July 2016). "Bienvenido, Mister Eisenhower: el protocolo de las banalidades". El Mundo.
- Payne, Stanley G. (1987). The Franco Regime, 1936–1975. Madison: The University of Wisconsin Press. ISBN 0-299-11070-2.
- Powell, Charles (2007). "The United States and Spain: From Franco to Juan Carlos". In Townson, Nigel (ed.). Spain Transformed. The Late Franco Dictatorship, 1959-75. Basingstoke: Palgrave Macmillan. pp. 227–247. ISBN 0-230-00455-5.
- Rosendorf, Neal M. (2014). Franco Sells Spain to America: Hollywood, Tourism and Public Relations as Postwar Spanish Soft Power. Palgrave Macmillan. ISBN 978-1-349-45264-4.
- Whealey, Robert H. (1995). Blumberg, Arnold (ed.). Great Leaders, Great Tyrants?: Contemporary Views of World Rulers who Made History. Westport & London: Greenwood Publishing Group. pp. 72–79. ISBN 0-313-28751-1.
