= Carabanchel Bajo =

Former municipality of Spain

Coordinates: 40°23′N 3°44′W

Carabanchel Bajo (or Carabanchel de Yuso) was a municipality of Spain, located in the province of Madrid. It was on the right (south) bank of the Manzanares and enjoyed a healthier climate than Madrid as well as beautiful views of that city of which it is now a part.

The settlement was founded by the mid-15th century, when a group of neighbors moved there and the Church of San Pedro was built. The village (just like the neighbouring Carabanchel Alto, together collectively known as Los carabancheles) became a favourite location for the construction of quintas for the leisure of the Madrilenian bourgeoisie and aristocracy in the 18th century. Annexed by the municipality of Madrid on 29 April 1948, its former territory currently comprises part of the districts of Latina, Carabanchel and Usera.

Historical population
Year	Pop.	±%
1900	5,862	—
1920	13,242	+125.9%
1930	31,010	+134.2%
1948	36,262	+16.9%
Source: López Gómez (1983)
