= Manuel Díez-Alegría =

Spanish military officer, diplomat and academician

General Manuel Díez-Alegría
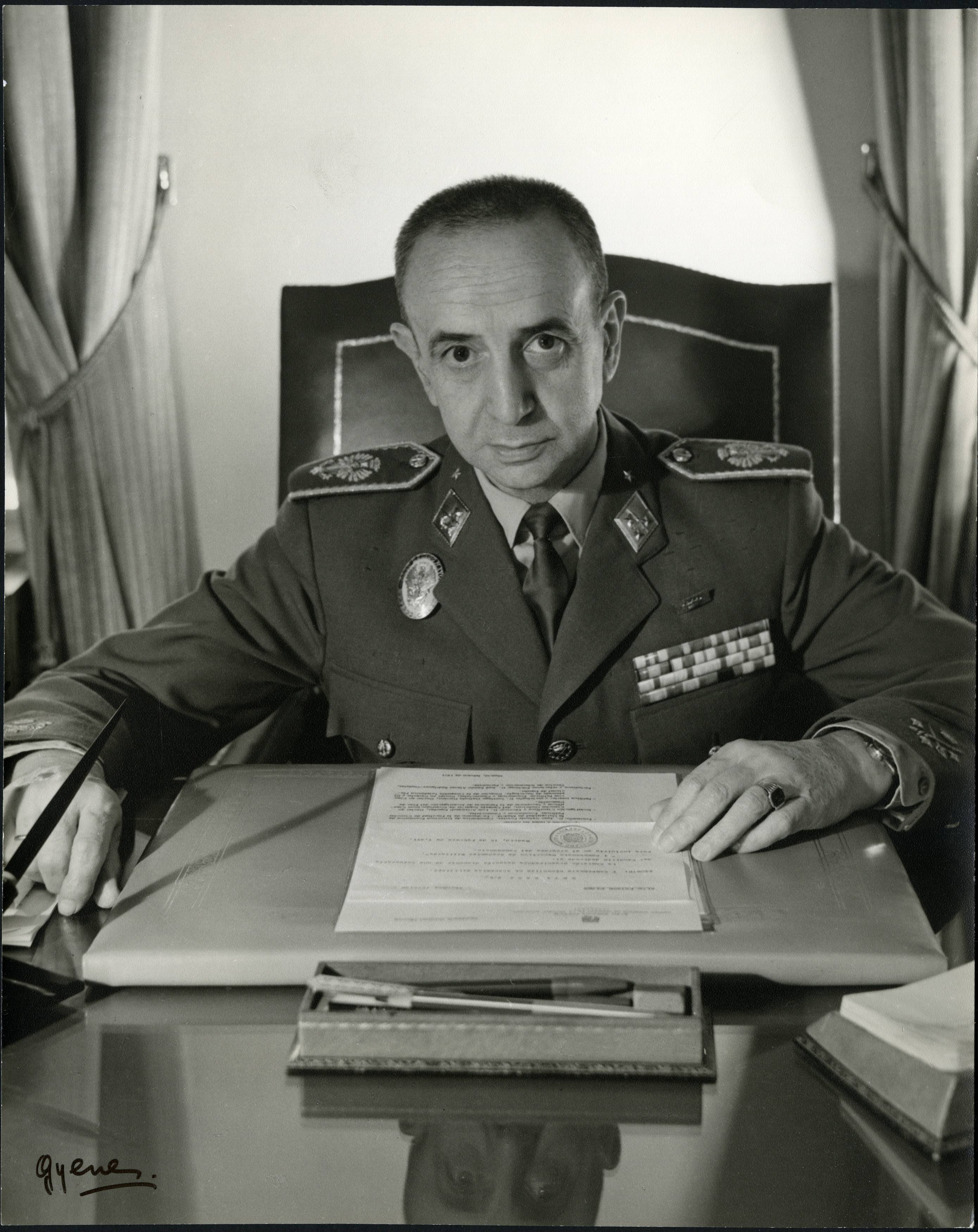
- Manuel Díez-Alegría in 1980, photographed by Juan Gyenes

Ambassador of Spain to Egypt
- In office 20 February 1976 – 5 June 1978
- Monarch: Juan Carlos I
- Preceded by: Manuel Alabart Miranda
- Succeeded by: José Luis Flórez-Estrada y Ayala

Chief of the Defence High Command
- In office 23 July 1970 – 14 June 1974
- Leader: Francisco Franco
- Preceded by: Agustín Muñoz Grandes
- Succeeded by: Carlos Fernández Vallespín

Seat G of the Real Academia Española
- In office 20 January 1980 – 3 February 1987
- Preceded by: José María de Cossío
- Succeeded by: José María de Areilza

Personal details
- Born: Manuel Díez-Alegría Gutiérrez; 25 July 1906 Llanes (Asturias), Spain
- Died: 3 February 1987 (aged 80) Madrid, Spain
- Education: Academy of Military Engineering of Guadalajara; Colegio de la Inmaculada (Gijón)

Military service
- Allegiance: Kingdom of Spain; Spanish Republic; Nationalist Spain
- Branch/service: Spanish Army
- Years of service: 1923–1974
- Rank: Lieutenant general
- Battles/wars: Spanish Civil War

Manuel Díez-Alegría Gutiérrez (25 July 1906 – 3 February 1987) was a Spanish military officer who served as Chief of the Defence High Command (Alto Estado Mayor, AEM) between 1970 and 1974, i.e., chief of staff of the Spanish Armed Forces during the Francoist dictatorship.

== Non-military positions ==
Díez-Alegría served as Ambassador of Spain to Egypt between 1976 and 1978, during the Spanish transition to democracy.

Additionally, he was a member of the Royal Academy of Moral and Political Sciences from 1968, the Royal Spanish Academy from 1980, and the Cortes Españolas (1970–1977).

== Awards ==
- Grand Cross of the Royal and Military Order of Saint Hermenegild (1961)
- Grand Cross (with White Decoration) of Military Merit (1964)
- Grand Cross (with White Decoration) of Naval Merit (1968)
- Grand Cross of the Imperial Order of the Yoke and Arrows (1969)
- Grand Cross of the Order of Isabella the Catholic (1970)
- Grand Cross of the Civil Order of Alfonso X, the Wise (1971)
- Grand Cross of the Order of Civil Merit (1977)

Military offices
Preceded by Agustín Muñoz Grandes	Chief of the Defence High Command; 23 July 1970 – 14 June 1974	Succeeded by Carlos Fernández Vallespín
Diplomatic posts
Preceded by Manuel Alabart Miranda	Ambassador of Spain to Egypt; 20 February 1976 – 5 June 1978	Succeeded by José Luis Flórez-Estrada y Ayala
