= Juan Vigón (general) =

Spanish general (1880–1955)

Juan Vigón Suerodíaz
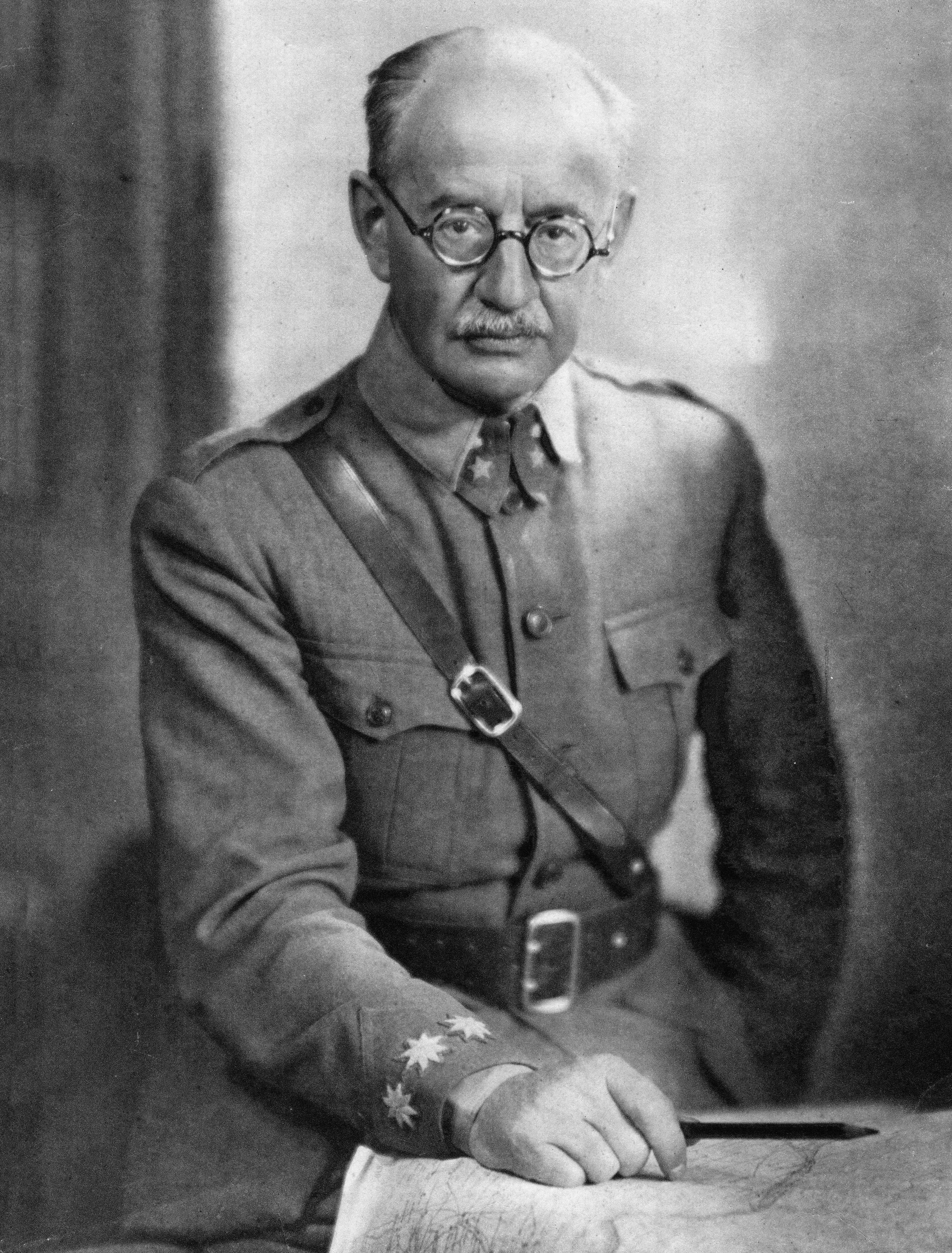
- Photographed by Jalón Ángel in 1930.
- Born: Juan Vigón Suerodíaz; 30 October 1880; Colunga, Kingdom of Spain
- Died: 25 May 1955 (aged 74); Madrid, Francoist Spain
- Military career
- Allegiance: Kingdom of Spain; Spanish Republic; Nationalist Spain
- Branch: Spanish Army
- Rank: General
- Conflicts: Rif War; Spanish Civil War
- Awards: Military Medal

Juan Vigón Suerodíaz, Marquis of Vigón (30 October 1880, Colunga – 25 May 1955, Madrid) was a Spanish general who fought in the Spanish Civil War for the Nationalist faction.

== Biography ==
Vigón was born in Colunga, Asturias, Spain. Before the war he was chosen by King Alfonso XIII to educate his sons, which he did from November 1925 to 1930. At the beginning of the Second Spanish Republic (14 April 1931) he left the Spanish Army due to his monarchist sympathies. With just a brief return to the army during the Revolution of 1934, he kept out of the army, as lieutenant-colonel in reserve, until the Spanish Civil War broke out on 18 July 1936. In Argentina at the outbreak of the war, he returned to Spain where his first military position was as Chief of Staff of Colonel Alfonso Beorlegui Canet, in the Campaign of Gipuzkoa. Later on he was nominated as Staff Colonel during the Battle of Bilbao and was the architect of the War in the North as a member of the General Staff. He was awarded the Military Medal and became General after the War in the North, became commander's chief of staff at the Aragon Offensive. After the war he served as Minister of the Air Force, became Lieutenant-General and Chief of the Defence High Command (chief of staff of the Spanish Armed Forces) and, until his death at Madrid in 1955, president of the Nuclear Energy Board, and of the Aeronautical Technic National Institute. Franco granted him a posthumous marquisate.

== Notes ==
Government offices
| Preceded by Juan Yagüe | Ministry of the Air Force; 27 June 1940 – 20 July 1945 | Succeeded by Eduardo González-Gallarza |
Military offices
| New title | Chief of the Defence High Command; 30 August 1939 – 27 June 1940 | Succeeded by Francisco Martín-Moreno |
| Preceded by Luis Orgaz Yoldi | Chief of the Defence High Command; 15 February 1946 – 25 May 1955 | Succeeded by Carlos Asensio Cabanillas |
Spanish nobility
| New creation | Marquis of Vigón; 1955 | Succeeded by Juan Ramón Vigón Sánchez |
