= Antonio Martorell Lacave =

Spanish Navy officer (1960–2023)

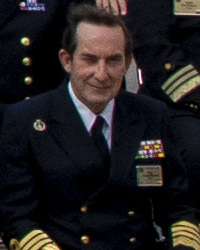
- Lacave in 2021

Admiral Chief of Staff of the Navy
- In office 10 February 2021 – 31 March 2023
- Monarch: Felipe VI
- Prime Minister: Pedro Sánchez
- Preceded by: Teodoro Esteban López Calderón; Fausto Escrigas Rodríguez (acting)
- Succeeded by: Antonio Piñeiro Sánchez

Personal details
- Born: 22 August 1960 Bilbao, Spain
- Died: 31 March 2023 (aged 62) Madrid, Spain
- Children: 3
- Education: Marín’s Naval Academy

Military service
- Allegiance: Spain
- Branch/service: Spanish Navy
- Years of service: 1984—2023
- Rank: Admiral General
- Unit: Spanish Navy Spain
- Commands: Cataluña (F73), 2nd Minesweeper Squadron, 1st MCM Squadron, 21 Escort Squadron, Naval Action Group 2, Operation Atalanta, Maritime HQ of Alta Availability, Admiral Chief of Staff of the Navy
- Battles/wars: Operation Active Endeavor

Antonio Martorell Lacave (22 August 1960 – 31 March 2023) was a Spanish Navy officer. Among other offices, he served as Admiral Chief of Staff of the Navy since February 2021 until his death in March 2023.

Lacave was a veteran submarine, NATO and admiral general of the Spanish Navy (Spanish: Almirante general). He was born on 22 August 1960 in Bilbao. His father had served in Navy Corps of Engineers as a captain. He enrolled in Marín’s Naval Academy Pontevedra in 1979 and was commissioned as an officer after he graduated in 1984. He subsequently served on frigates, corvettes and minesweepers. He served as commander of the Minesweeper Miño and the NATO Standing Countermine Measures Group No. 2. He served in the Amphibious Assault Ship Castilla, 2nd Minesweeper Squadron as executive. He has lectured at the Armed Forces Higher School. He also served as chief in Torpedoes Workshop Cartagena Shipyard.

Lacave served in the Directorate-General for Defense Policy of the European Union as chief executive. He served at NATO Joint General HQ, Naples in the exercise division. After he was promoted to rear admiral in 2014, he served at the Logistics Division of the Naval Staff Defence HQ as head until April 2015.

Lacave commanded the Naval Action Group 2 for several years before becoming Admiral of Naval Action, and he oversaw Operation Atalanta and Maritime HQ of Alta as commander. He was promoted to vice admiral in 2020 and became Admiral of the fleet in May 2020.

Lacave became Chief of Staff of the Navy in February 2021, succeeding Admiral General Teodoro López Calderón (although Fausto Escrigas Rodríguez had been serving in an acting capacity at the time).

Lacave died from cancer in Madrid on 31 March 2023, at the age of 62.

== Decorations ==
- Commander with Star of the Royal and Military Order of San Hermenegildo
- Grand Cross of the Royal and Military Order of San Hermenegildo
- Grand Cross of Naval Merit
- Cross of Naval Merit
- Cross of Military Merit (White Badge)
- Kuwait Liberation Medal
- Brazilian Naval Medal
- Article 5 Medal for Operation Active Endeavor
- Cross of the Order Police Merit
- Grand Cross of Aeronautical Merit, (white badge).

Badges

- Peace Operations Badge

Military offices
Preceded by Teodoro Esteban López Calderón Fausto Escrigas Rodríguez (Acting)	Admiral Chief of Staff of the Navy; 2021–2023	Succeeded by Antonio Piñeiro Sánchez
