= Teodoro Esteban López Calderón =

Spanish Navy officer (born 1954)

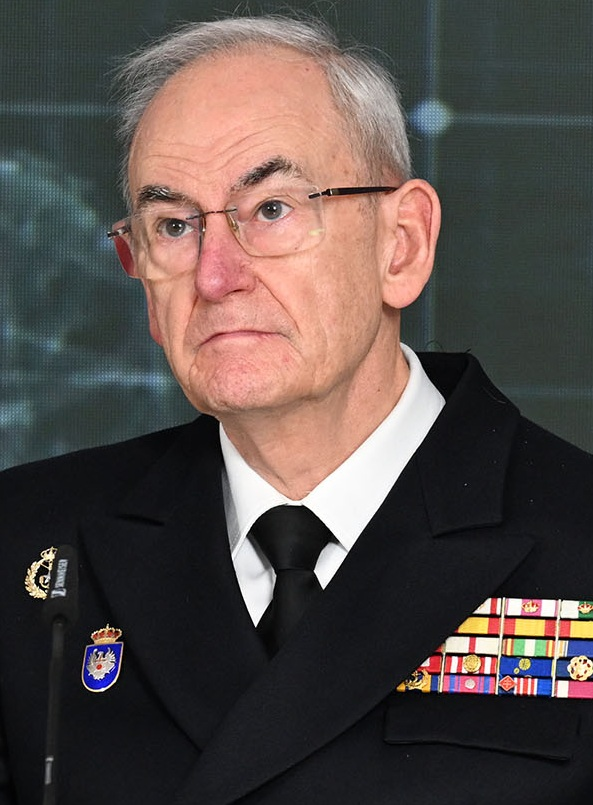
- In 2025

Chief of the Defence Staff
- Incumbent
- Assumed office 27 January 2021
- Monarch: Felipe VI
- Prime Minister: Pedro Sánchez
- Preceded by: Miguel Ángel Villarroya

Admiral Chief of Staff of the Navy
- In office 1 April 2017 – 27 January 2021
- Monarch: Felipe VI
- Prime Minister: Mariano Rajoy (2017–2018); Pedro Sánchez (2018–present)
- Preceded by: Jaime Muñoz-Delgado
- Succeeded by: Antonio Martorell Lacave; Fausto Escrigas Rodríguez (Acting)

Personal details
- Born: Teodoro Esteban López Calderón; 3 May 1954 (age 72) Cartagena, Spain
- Education: Escuela Naval Militar

Military service
- Allegiance: Spain
- Branch/service: Spanish Navy
- Years of service: 1973—present
- Rank: Admiral General
- Commands: Villaamil (P-04); Cataluña (F73); 2nd Minesweeper Squadron; 41st Escort Squadron; Naval Action Group 2; Admiral Chief of Staff of the Navy; Chief of the Defence Staff
- Battles/wars: Operation Active Endeavor

Teodoro Esteban López Calderón (born 3 May 1954) is a Spanish Navy officer who is serving as the 12th and current Chief of the Defence Staff of the Spanish Armed Forces since 27 January 2021. Previously, he served as Admiral Chief of Staff of the Navy from 2017 and 2021.

== Biography ==
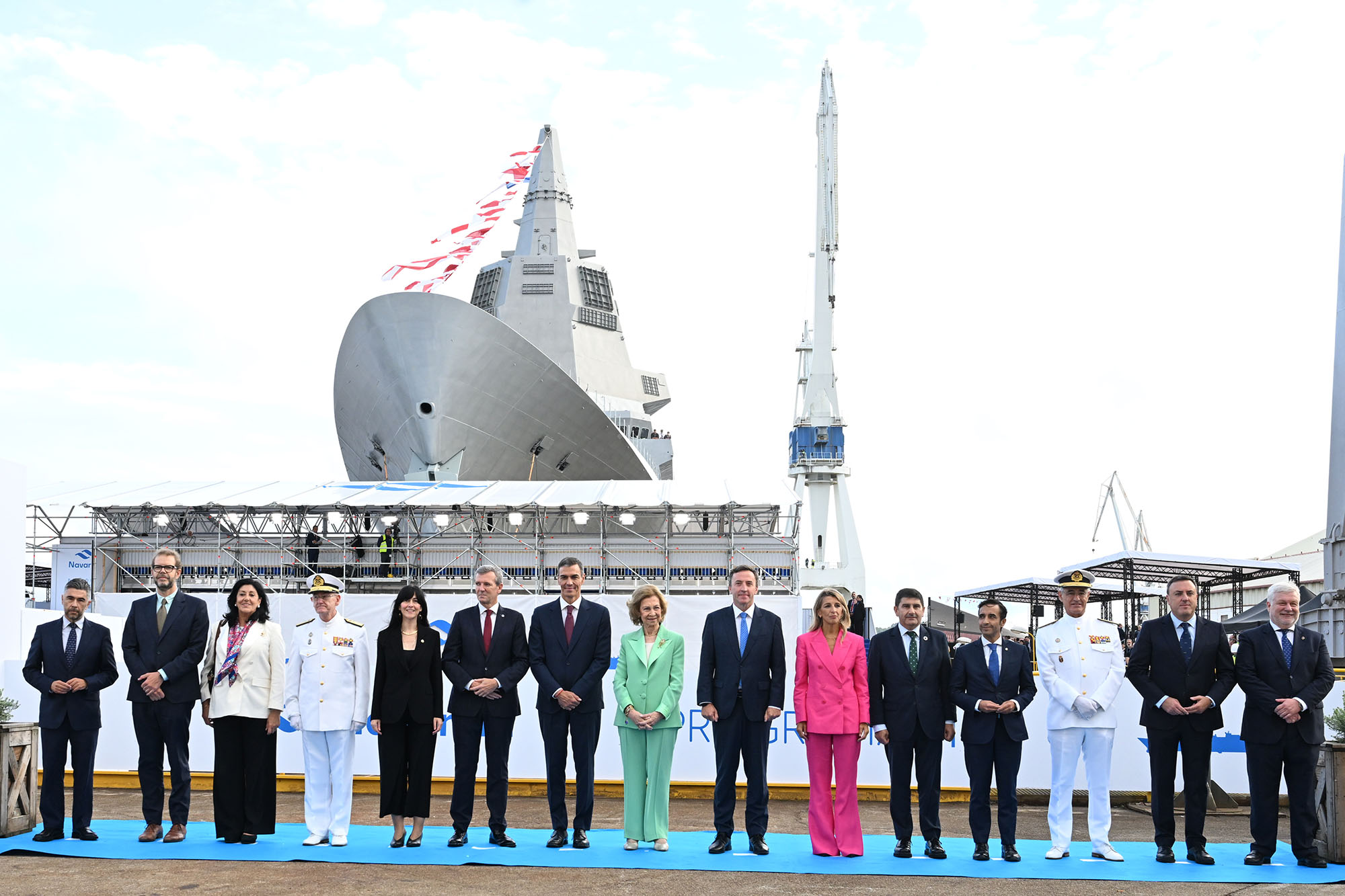
Admiral López in the launching ceremony of the frigate Bonifaz

López Calderón was born in 1954 in the city of Cartagena and joined the Spanish Navy after graduating at the Escuela Naval Militar in 1973. He is a specialist in electronics, tactics and weapons systems. He also completed various courses locally and abroad, such as the Senior Course at the NATO Defense College, the Navy General Staff Course, Electronics Expert courses, and the Tactical Action Office course.

Throughout his naval career, he held the command of the Villaamil (P-04) patrol vessel, the 2nd Minesweeper Squadron, the frigate Cataluña (F73), the 41st Escort Squadron (Frigates), and the Naval Action Group 2. During the latter, López Calderón took part in Operation Active Endeavor, as the 2nd Group included the Spanish surface ships that were assigned to the mission. He also served on various ships of the Spanish Navy, such as the Descubierta (F31), the Asturias (F74), the Extremadura (F75), and the Numancia (F83).

He also served as the Chief of Staff of the 21st Escort Squadron and as a Staff member of the "Delta" Group, a task group in charge of monitoring the maritime borders of the Basque Country to prevent weapons smuggling and against the clandestine trafficking of terrorist related operations. He also served at the U.S. Naval Forces Southern Command on 1997, and the Standing NATO Maritime Group 2, and as the Chief of the General Staff for Operations and Deputy Chief of the General Staff at the Operations Command. He also served as the President of the Spanish Section of the Hispano-North American Standing Committee, and also served at the Headquarters of the Strategic Plans Section of the Plans Division of the Navy General Staff and Operations of the Naval Operational Command Staff. From 1987 to 1996 he served as an elective member of the Electronic Warfare Doctrine Board of the Navy.

He also served a technical adviser to the Minister of Defense and head of the Navy General Staff's strategic planning section. López Calderón also served as the Chief of the General Staff for Operations and Deputy Chief of the General Staff at the Operations Command on the Defence Staff.

He was appointed by the Council of Ministers as the replacement of Admiral General Jaime Muńoz-Delgado on 31 March 2017 as the new Chief of Staff of the Navy. In November 2020, after the Vox political party requested that Navy ships block the arrival of illegal boats to the Canary Islands, the head of the Navy settled the issue by publicly declaring that "if any Spanish warship is found with a boat in a situation where the lives of those on it are in danger, its [of the Navy] obligation of all kinds, legal and moral, is to rescue them. And that's what they would do."

In January 2021, after the resignation of JEMAD Miguel Ángel Villarroya, he was appointed as the Chief of Staff of the Spanish Armed Forces.

== Awards and decorations ==
Spain

- Grand Cross of Naval Merit
- Grand Cross of the Royal and Military Order of San Hermenegildo
- Grand Cross of the Order of Merit of the Civil Guard
- Commander with Star of the Royal and Military Order of San Hermenegildo
- Commander of the Royal and Military Order of San Hermenegildo
- Cross of the Royal and Military Order of San Hermenegildo
- Cross of Military Merit
- Cross of Naval Merit (Five Times)
- Cross of the Order Guard Merit of the Civil Guard
- Cross of the Order Police Merit

Australia

- Officer of the Order of Australia – 3 May 2022 – For distinguished service in strengthening the defence relationship between Australia and Spain through personal commitment, engagement and support to Australia.

France

- Chevalier of the Order of National Merit of the French Republic

NATO

- NATO Meritorious Service Medal
- Article 5 Medal for Operation Active Endeavor

United States

- Meritorious Service Medal

== Personal life ==
He is married with five children and also has two grandchildren. He can speak fluent English along with his native Spanish.

Military offices
| Preceded by Miguel Ángel Villarroya | Chief of the Defence Staff; 2021–present | Succeeded by Incumbent |
| Preceded by Jaime Muñoz-Delgado | Admiral Chief of Staff of the Navy; 2017—2021 | Succeeded by Antonio Martorell Lacave Fausto Escrigas Rodríguez (Acting) |
