= Miguel Ángel Villarroya =

Spanish Air and Space Force general

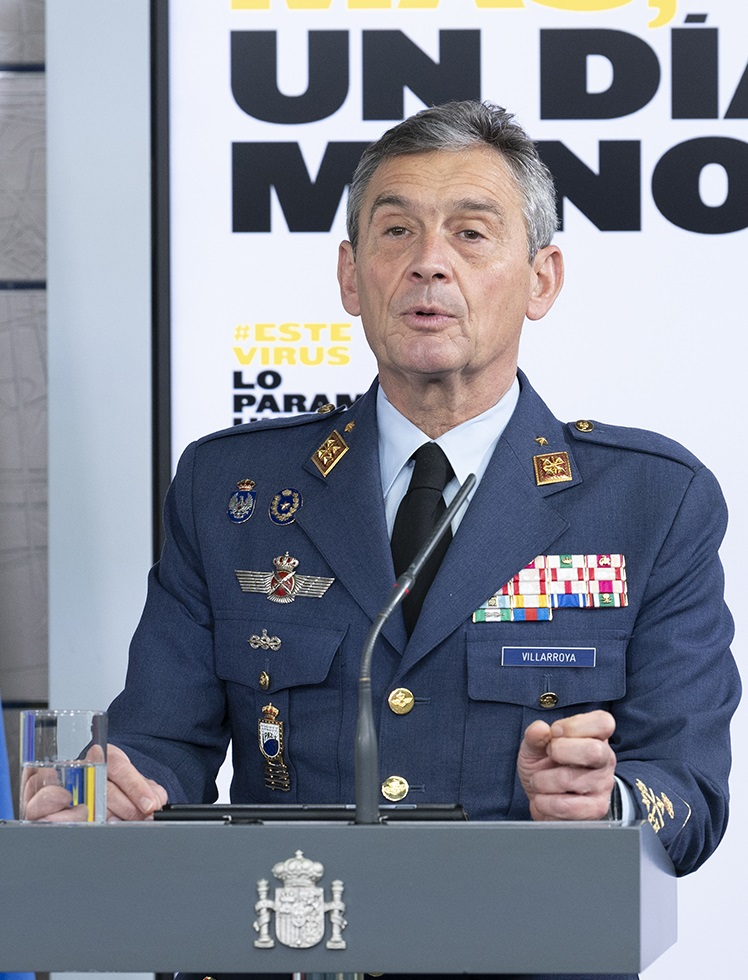
- In 2019
- Born: 15 May 1957 (age 69); La Galera, Tarragona, Spain
- Military career
- Allegiance: Kingdom of Spain
- Branch: Spanish Air and Space Force
- Service years: 1980–2021
- Rank: General of the Air
- Commands: Chief of the Defence Staff; Chief of the Defence Minister' Technical Cabinet; Chief of the Canary Islands Air Command; Chief of the Torrejón Air Base
- Conflicts: Liberation of Kuwait campaign Spanish Icarus Detachment (air force support to the Balkans); Rwandan Civil War
- Awards: See Awards.

Miguel Ángel Villarroya Vilalta (born 15 May 1957) is a Spanish Air and Space Force general who served as the 11th Chief of the Defence Staff of Spain from 2020 to 2021. Before this, from 2017 to 2020 he was the Chief of the Technical Cabinet of the Defence Ministers María Dolores de Cospedal (2017–2018) and Margarita Robles (2018–2020).

== Biography ==
=== Early life and education ===
Villarroya was born in La Galera, in the province of Tarragona on May 15, 1957. He got his civil pilot license at the age of 17. A year later, he joined the General Air Force Academy in San Javier, where he started his military studies, obtaining its lieutenant rank in 1980, at the 32nd promotion. He has also General Staff studies.

Villarroya has more than 9,800 flying hours mainly with the Lockheed C-130 Hercules.

=== Military career ===
After finishing his studies at the Air Force Academy in 1980, he joined the Matacán Schools Group at the Matacán Air Force Base, a group of schools to training air force officials for command as well as other air force skills. In 1981 he was assigned to the 31 Wing, an Air Force transport unit. In the same destination, he is promoted to captain in 1983 and to commander in 1989.

In July 1996, he is assigned to the Operative Aire Force Command HQ and two years later, in November 1998, he is promoted to lieutenant colonel.

From 2000 y 2005 he served as the chief of the Torrejón Air Force Base forces, being promoted to colonel and promoted to chief of the mentioned Air Base, a position he hold from 2005 to 2011. In April 2012, he was appointed Deputy Director of the European Air Group until May 2014, when he was appointed chief of the General Secretariat of the Air Force General Staff.

Villarroya joined the Air Force generalship in January 2011, when he was promoted to brigadier general. Three years later, he was promoted to divisional general. As divisional general, he was appointed as Chief of the Canary Islands Air Command until April 2017, when Defence Minister, María Dolores de Cospedal, appointed him as her Technical Cabinet Director, being promoted at the same time to lieutenant general.

In June 2018, the change of government led Margarita Robles to take leadership of the Ministry of Defense, renewing confidence in Villarroya as Director of the Technical Cabinet.

In January 2020, prime minister Pedro Sánchez appointed Villaroya as Chief of the Defence Staff, as well as promoting him to Air General.

In January 2021, Villaroya tendered his resignation as Chief of the Defence Staff, after information on the COVID-19 vaccination of more than 100 high-ranking officers of the armed forces, including himself, despite not being on the list for preferential access. He was replaced by Admiral General Teodoro Esteban López Calderón on January 27, 2021.

After his dismissal, on February 3, 2021 he was appointed a member of the Assembly of the Royal and Military Order of Saint Hermenegild and, on March 16, 2021, he was appointed as military attaché in the Permanent Observer Mission of Spain to the Organization of American States (OAS) and advisor for Hemispheric Security Affairs.

In April 2023, he was appointed Gran Chancellor of the Royal and Military Order of Saint Hermenegild and, as such, also chairman of the Assembly of the Royal and Military Order of Saint Ferdinand.

== Awards ==
Villarroya awards and badges:

- Grand Cross of Aeronautical Merit, white badge.
- Grand Cross of the Royal and Military Order of Saint Hermenegild.
- Grand Cross of the Order of Merit of the Civil Guard.
- Commander with Star of the Royal and Military Order of Saint Hermenegild.
- Commander of the Royal and Military Order of Saint Hermenegild.
- Cross of the Royal and Military Order of Saint Hermenegild.
- Cross of Aeronautical Merit, 2nd class.
- Cross of Aeronautical Merit, 1st class (2).
- Cross of Aeronautical Merit, white badge (2).
- Cross of Military Merit, 1st class.
- Silver Cross of the Order of the Civil Guard Merit.
- Commander by Number of the Royal and Much Distinguished Order of Charles III.
- Commander of the Royal and American Order of Isabella the Catholic.
- Kuwait Liberation Medal.
- NATO Medal.
- Medal of the National Order of Merit of the Republic of Malta, "Companion" grade.

Badges

- Pilot Badge (Spain).
- Badge of Peacekeeping Operations with "Persian Gulf", "Provide Comfort", "UNPROFOR" and "Adriatic" pins (Spain).
- Badge of the Military Staff of the Air Force (Spain).
- Badge of the Chief of the Defence Staff (Spain).

== Personal life ==
He is married, and he has two children, along with three grandchildren.

Military offices
Preceded by Fernando Alejandre Martínez	Chief of the Defence Staff; 15 January 2020 – 27 January 2021	Succeeded by Teodoro Esteban López Calderón
