= Mateo García de los Reyes =

Spanish naval officer and politician, first chief of the Spanish submarine force

Don Mateo García de los Reyes
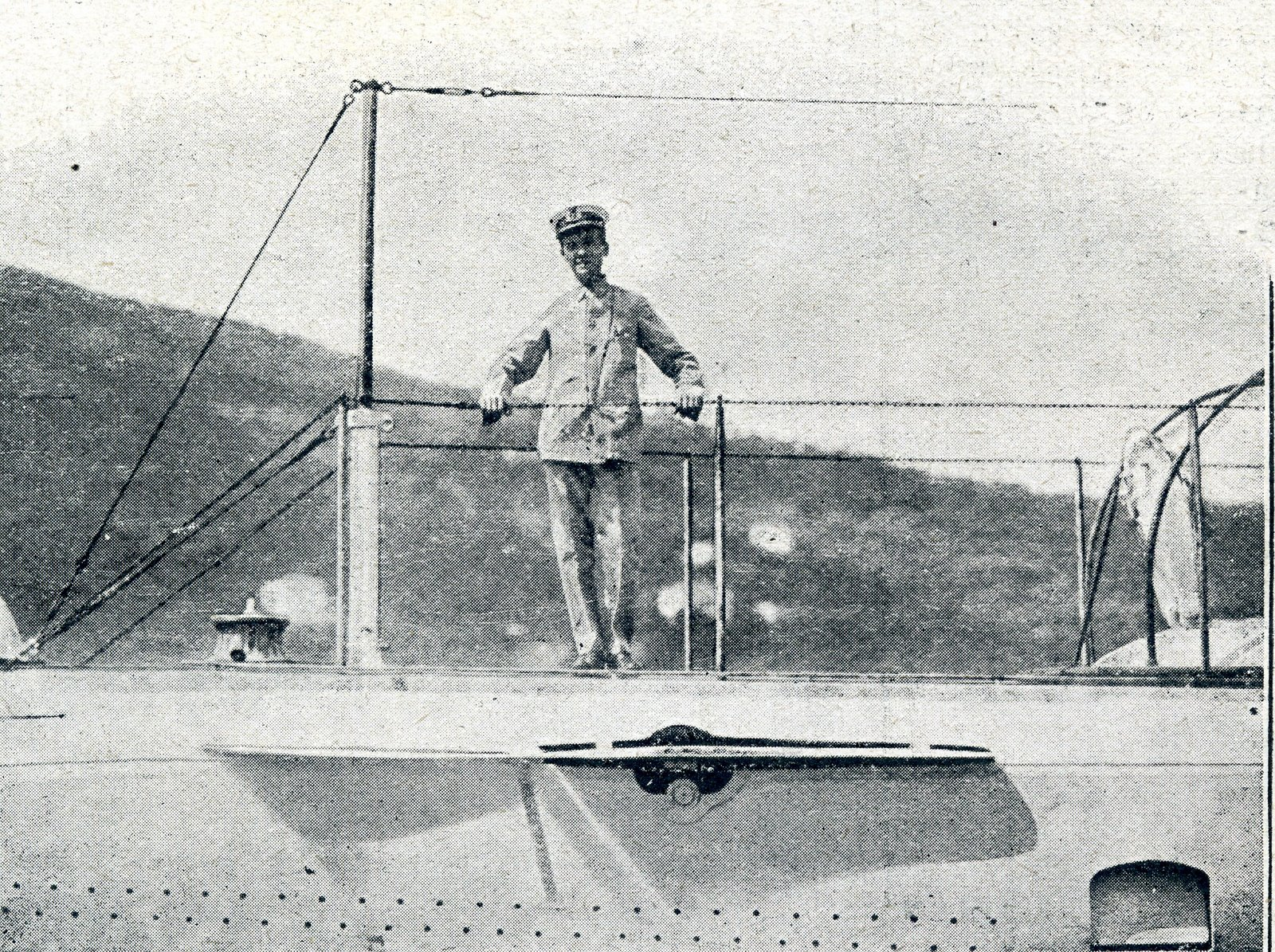
- Mateo García de los Reyes as a capitán de corbeta (corvette captain) on the bridge of an A-class submarine in 1917.

Minister of the Navy
- In office 5 November 1928 – 30 January 1930
- Monarch: King Alfonso XIII
- Prime Minister: Miguel Primo de Rivera
- Preceded by: Honorio Cornejo Carvajal
- Succeeded by: Salvador Carvia Caravaca

Personal details
- Born: 5 February 1872 Montevideo, Uruguay
- Died: 24 November 1936 (aged 64) Paracuellos de Jarama, Spain
- Cause of death: Execution by firing squad
- Resting place: Cemetery of the Martyrs of Paracuellos, Paracuellos de Jarama, Spain
- Parent(s): Mateo García Anguiano and Manuela de los Reyes del Villar
- Education: Colegio Militar Naval (Naval Military College)
- Known for: First chief of Spanish Navy Submarine Force

Military service
- Allegiance: Kingdom of Spain
- Branch/service: Spanish Navy
- Years of service: 1886–1931
- Rank: Contralmirante (Counter admiral)
- Commands: Basco; Radiotelegraphy School; Diving School; Narciso Monturiol (A-1); Submarine Division
- Battles/wars: Philippine Revolution; Kert campaign; Rif War
- Awards: Medalla Naval (Navy Medal); Cross of Naval Merit

Mateo García de los Reyes (5 February 1872 – 24 November 1936) was a Spanish naval officer and politician. He served in Spanish Navy operations against Filipino insurgents during the Philippine Revolution of 1896–1898 and in the Kert campaign of 1911–1912. He was the organizer and first chief of the Spanish Navy's submarine force and during the Rif War in 1922 led that force's first combat operation. He served as minister of the navy from 1928 to 1930. Early in the Spanish Civil War, he was arrested and executed by Republican forces on suspicion of having Nationalist sympathies.

== Biography ==
=== Early life ===
García de los Reyes was born at 06:00 on 5 February 1872 in Montevideo, Uruguay, to Mateo García Anguiano and Manuela de los Reyes del Villar, the only boy among the couple's five children. His father, Mateo Sr., was the commanding officer of the Spanish Navy screw frigate Almansa, which was based at Montevideo at the time. For a short time, his father also served as acting commander of the naval base at Montevideo and the Spanish Navy squadron based there, but a persistent myth that his father was the Spanish consul in Montevideo is not true and appears to have arisen because he carried out a diplomatic mission as Spain's highest-ranking representative in the region. Almansa′s chaplain baptized the baby boy with the names Mateo Felipe Adolfo Hercilio on 10 February 1872 at the Main Church in Montevideo.

After the family returned to Spain, King Alfonso XII appointed Mateo Sr. as his aide-de-camp in 1880. As a result, the family moved into the Royal Palace of Madrid, where the younger Mateo began his schooling. Mateo Sr. subsequently received a promotion to brigadier de la armada (navy brigadier) and in 1881 was made Commandant General of the Captaincy General of Puerto Rico. The family moved to Puerto Rico, where Mateo Sr. died of tuberculosis in December 1882. The family returned to Madrid and the royal court after his death. Thanks to royal patronage, García de los Reyes continued to receive an excellent education. However, he decided to join the Spanish Navy to reduce the burden on his mother of raising five children as a widow and received his mother's permission to do so, a requirement for a minor.

=== Early career ===
After passing the required entrance examinations, García de los Reyes was accepted to the Colegio Naval Militar (Naval Military College) on 5 January 1886. On 1 February 1886, at the age of 14, García de los Reyes entered the Colegio Naval Militar, located aboard the old screw frigate Asturias, hulked at Ferrol as a floating jetty.

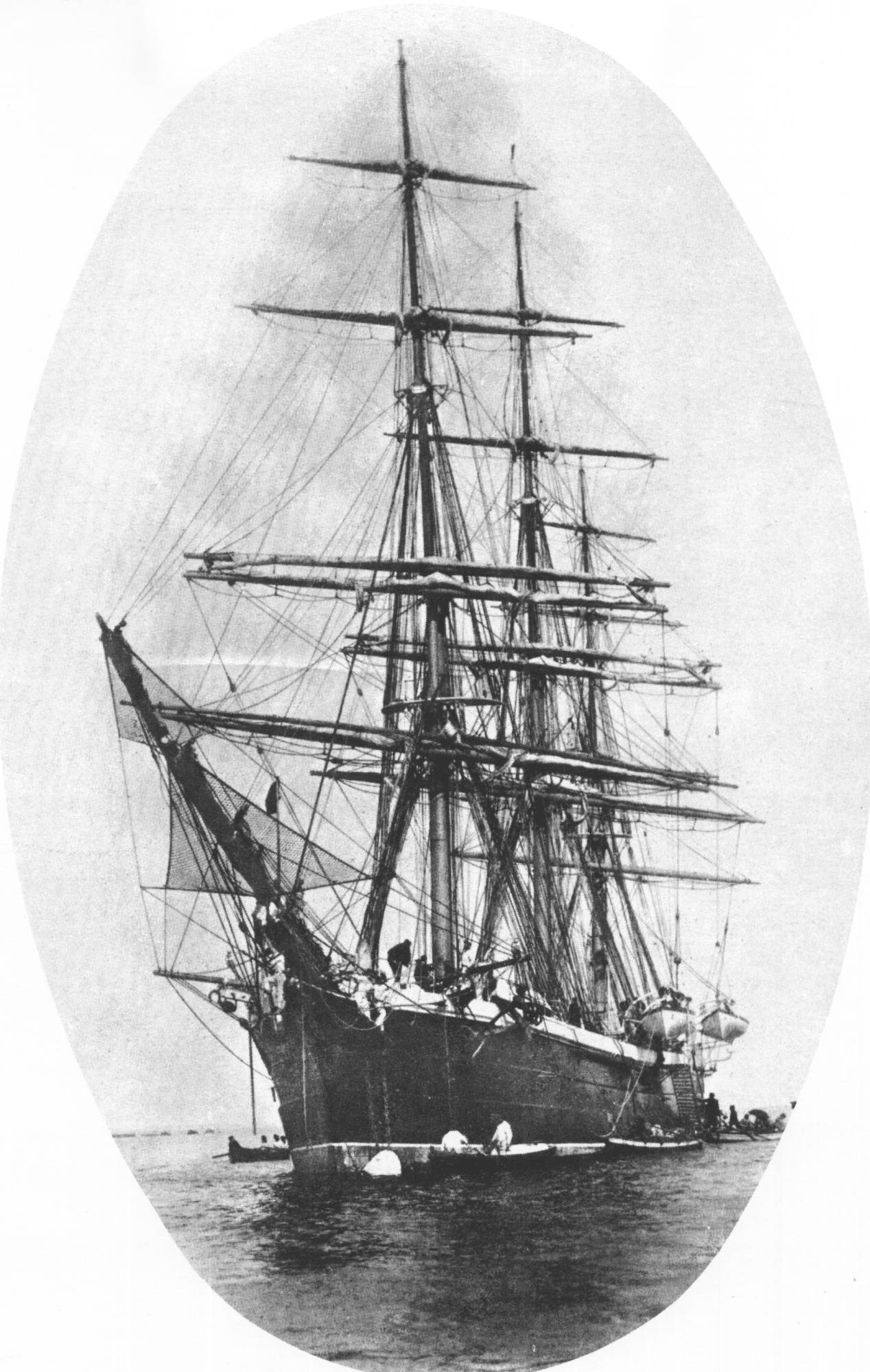
The Spanish Navy corvette Nautilus in the 1890s.

On 7 December 1888, García de los Reyes was appointed as a guardiamarina (midshipman), and on 7 December 1891, having completed his studies, he was promoted to alférez de navío (ship-of-the-line ensign). In the summer of 1892 he embarked for training at sea and his first major voyage aboard the corvette Nautilus, a training ship under the command of Capitán de fragata (Frigate Captain) Fernando Villaamil. The ship got underway from Ferrol on 30 November 1892, stopped at the Port of La Luz in Las Palmas de Gran Canaria on Gran Canaria in the Canary Islands, then made a transatlantic voyage to Bahia, Brazil. She crossed the Atlantic Ocean again and visited Cape Town in the Cape Colony. She then rounded the Cape of Good Hope, sailed as far south as the Antarctic Circle, stopped at Melbourne in the Colony of Victoria, Sydney in the Colony of New South Wales, and Wellington in the Colony of New Zealand. Her voyage then took her to the Society Islands, California, on the United States West Coast, Callao in Peru, and Valparaíso in Chile. Nautilus then rounded Cape Horn, stopped at Saint Helena, passed close by Puerto Rico without making a port call there, and called at New York City. She then crossed the Atlantic again, visited Plymouth in the United Kingdom and Cherbourg and Brest in France, and completed a 19 1/2-month circumnavigation of the world — during which she had crossed the equator four times — with her return to Spain, arriving at San Sebastián on 16 July 1894. There King Alfonso XIII and Queen Regent Maria Christina visited Nautilus.

Nautilus remained at San Sebastián until 1 August 1894, when she got underway bound for Ferrol. Along the way she was becalmed in the Cantabrian Sea, however, and had to put in at Bilbao with the assistance of a tug, mooring on the Nervión River opposite Sestao on 5 August and receiving visits according to protocol. On 6 August she again set out for Ferrol, which she reached at 08:00 on 11 August 1894 after an absence of 20 1/2 months.

García de los Reyes disembarked from Nautilus at Ferrol and received orders to duty in the Captaincy General of the Philippines. Traveling on a troopship, he arrived in the Philippine Islands in the Spanish East Indies later in 1894. There he became a commanding officer for the first time, taking command of the gunboat Basco. On 5 March 1895, the new commander general of the Cavite Naval Station, Vicente Carlos-Roca y Sansaloni, arrived and made García de los Reyes his personal assistant. García de los Reyes remained in this position until 13 May 1896, when he became executive officer of the gunboat General Lezo, aboard which he played an active role in Spain's military and naval campaign against Filipino insurgents during the Philippine Revolution of 1896–1898. He was promoted to the rank of capitán de corbeta (corvette captain) on 21 April 1897.

García de los Reyes completed his tour of duty in the Philippines in early 1898 and returned to Spain. Not long after his return, the Spanish-American War broke out. He spent the war at Cartagena, seeing no combat. The Spanish Navy suffered heavy losses, and as a result of the conflict the Spanish Empire lost control of Cuba, Puerto Rico, Guam, and the Philippines.

García de los Reyes was appointed personal aide to General José Marenco in September 1899. Demoralized by the disastrous results of the war, however, he requested a voluntary leave of absence from the navy so that he could pursue further education, as well as employment opportunities in the private sector. His voluntary leave request was granted on 16 September 1900, and he subsequently studied in Belgium, where he received a degree in electrical engineering. The Spanish Navy, with an excess of officers in its ranks, changed his status on 24 January 1908 from voluntary to compulsory leave.

In 1911, the Ministry of the Navy began efforts to revitalize the post-1898 Spanish Navy, and the navy recalled a number of officers to oversee the construction of new ships and to man existing ones. Accordingly, the navy finally recalled García de los Reyes to active duty, and on 3 September 1911 he began a tour as navigator aboard Infanta Isabel, a protected cruiser which had been modernized to serve as a colonial gunboat in the Spanish Empire. Aboard Infanta Isabel, he participated in combat operations in Spanish Morocco during the Kert campaign of 1911–1912 and operated in the waters of Spanish Guinea, policing the Gulf of Guinea and supporting Spanish authorities and forces ashore in Río Muni and on Fernando Po. Still facing the psychological impact of the disastrous war of 1898, however, he was considering leaving the navy entirely by 1912, and on 21 April 1913, he was placed in an inactive, unassigned administrative status.

=== Submarine force ===
World War I broke out in the summer of 1914, and in the Action of 22 September 1914 the Imperial German Navy submarine U-9 sank the British Royal Navy armoured cruisers HMS Aboukir, HMS Hogue, and HMS Cressy with four torpedoes in less than an hour in the Broad Fourteens region of the southern North Sea, killing 1,459 men. Spain remained neutral during the war, but U-9′s exploit demonstrated the potential of submarines in naval combat and prompted the Spanish Ministry of the Navy to reconsider its decision not to pursue the development of submarines after the Spanish inventor Isaac Peral built the submarine Peral in the late 19th century. It also reinvigorated García de los Reyes's interest in naval affairs, and he decided to remain in the navy.

On 17 February 1915, King Alfonso XIII signed the "Miranda Law" — named for Minister of the Navy Vicealmirante (Vice Admiral) Augusto Miranda y Godoy — which envisoned a Spanish Navy force of 28 submarines and authorized Miranda to acquire the Spanish Navy's first four operational submarines and a submarine rescue ship later named Kanguro. It also authorized Miranda to make administrative changes and personnel assignments to crew and support the new vessels. Passage of the law marks the birth of the Spanish Navy's submarine force.

Under the law, Spain acquired the first of the submarines in the United States and the next three in Italy. Miranda recalled García de los Reyes to active duty in 1915 and gave him an assignment to travel to both countries to inspect the construction of the submarines. After a few months of delay, García de los Reyes was assigned to the Spanish Navy's North American Naval Commission on 22 December 1915. He traveled to the United States to visit the Fore River Shipyard at Quincy, Massachusetts, which the Ministry of the Navy had contracted to build the first submarine. After he returned to Spain, he was assigned to the Spanish Navy's Italian Navy Commission and, as president of the Submarine Construction Inspection Commission, visited La Spezia, Italy, to monitor the construction of, and acquire expertise in technical aspects of, the next three submarines. These were Italian F-class submarines — which become known as the A class in Spanish service — which Spain had contracted with the Fiat-San Giorgio shipyards to construct at La Spezia. Subsequently, the commission visited Switzerland to study the new submarines' internal combustion engines manufactured by Sulzer.

At the beginning of 1917, García de los Reyes became prospective commanding officer of the first of the A-class submarines, Narciso Monturiol (A-1), which was launched on 15 April 1917 with the Spanish ambassador to Italy in attendance. García de los Reyes took full command of Narciso Monturiol when she was delivered to the Spanish Navy at La Spezia on 25 August 1917. He also was appointed head of the Spanish Navy's Submarine Division that day, holding both positions concurrently with his role as director of the Radiotelegraphy and Diving schools, both of which were located in Cartagena along with the new submarine force. After the shipyard delivered all three A-class submarines to the Spanish Navy, they made a cruise along the Italian coast from La Spezia to Genoa to test their equipment and conduct diving tests. After a few days at Genoa, where they completed fitting out, they got underway on 2 September 1917 for their delivery voyage to Spain with García de los Reyes in command of the submarine flotilla as a whole as well as of Narciso Monturiol. The protected cruiser Extremadura escorted the flotilla on its voyage. The three submarines and Extremadura arrived in Spain at Tarragona on 4 September 1917. They departed Tarragona on 8 September 1917 and proceeded to Cartagena. The three A-class submarines and Isaac Peral then made a cruise along the Spanish coast, visiting various ports to display themselves and their capabilities to the Spanish public.

While under García de los Reyes's command, Narciso Monturiol received her battle flag, donated by the city council of Barcelona, while moored alongside the battleship Alfonso XIII during a visit to Barcelona on 28 January 1919. On 5 July 1919, he received a promotion to capitán de fragata (frigate captain), and during the summer of 1919 the four submarines undertook their first extended cruise, accompanied by Extremadura. During this cruise, they arrived at Santander on 18 August 1919. On 22 August, King Alfonso XIII boarded Narciso Monturiol at Santander, and during the day she submerged off Cabo Mayor with him aboard, touching bottom at a depth of 24 metres (79 feet) and making him the first Spanish monarch to submerge aboard a submarine. García de los Reyes relinquished command of Narciso Monturiol on 24 October 1919 but remained the commander of the submarine division and of the Submarine School at Cartagena.

The Rif War broke out in Spanish Morocco in 1921, pitting Spanish forces against Riffian Berber tribes. During the war, Vélez de la Gomera — at the time an islet off the coast of North Africa, although a storm later created a peninsula which connected it to the mainland in 1930 — came under siege and constant fire by Riffian forces. The Spanish Navy decided to evacuate the civilian population of Vélez de la Gomera by submarine. As a result, as the commander of the submarine division, García de los Reyes led the Spanish Navy's first submarine combat operation. With Isaac Peral as his flagship, he personally commanded the operation, which involved Isaac Peral and the submarine B-1, supported by the battleship España. The two submarines departed Cartagena in mid-April 1922 and proceeded to Melilla on the North African coast, where they rendezvoused with España. The three ships then headed for Vélez de la Gomera. On the afternoon of 17 April Isaac Peral and B-1 conducted a three-hour reconnaissance of the islet and its surroundings. Off the islet's western inlet, Isaac Peral surfaced within sight of the Riffians to make a turn and moored at a rocky outcrop at Cemetery Cove, where García de los Reyes proposed to civilian spectators on the islet that they embark aboard the submarines that night. Both the civilians and the military commander on the islet agreed to this plan. Meanwhile, the Riffians opened artillery and rifle fire on the submarines. While Isaac Peral was moored to the outcrop, a rifle bullet hit her and a shell landed in the water three metres (10 ft) off her bow. Still under fire, the submarines withdrew on the surface.

The two submarines, each equipped with a bow boom and a boat from España, headed toward the islet again at 22:30 on 17 April. Isaac Peral lowered her bow boom into Cemetery Cove and brought 66 or 69 people aboard (according to different sources) under artillery and rifle fire from Riffian forces. The garrison of Vélez de la Gomera returned fire. B-1 embarked 37 people, and plans called for her to take Isaac Peral′s place in the cove, but before she could, the operation ended at 03:00 on 18 April because changes in the current made it impossible for the submarines to maintain their positions. The two submarines withdrew. For this action, García de los Reyes received the Medalla Naval (Navy Medal), the highest decoration awarded to Spanish Navy personnel at that time, on 18 April 1922. The submarines returned to Spain at Águilas on 20 April 1922.

García de los Reyes was appointed Gentleman of the Bedchamber Grandee of Spain and in this position accompanied King Alfonso XIII, Queen Victoria Eugenie, Infante Jaime on their visit to Italy in 1923. He received a promotion to the rank of capitán de navío (ship-of-the-line captain) on 25 August 1924, retaining his position as director of the Submarine School at Cartagena, which had expanded its role to include the Radiotelegraphy School and the Diving School. He was promoted to contralmirante (counter admiral) on 30 October 1928. Upon his promotion to contralmirante, he relinquished command of the submarine force.

=== Minister of the Navy ===
A few hours after turning over command of the submarine force to his successor, García de los Reyes received a telephone call ordering him to Madrid, where he had been appointed to serve as minister of the navy in the government of Miguel Primo de Rivera. He was sworn in as minister on 5 November 1928.

Upon becoming minister, García de los Reyes found his influence constrained by Spanish government of funding of the navy, because construction spending and the availability of discretionary funds already had been set for the next ten years. Nonetheless, during his 15 months as minister of the navy, he undertook numerous bureaucratic reforms, both in material and personnel matters in the navy. Among his most significant innovations were:

- On 9 January 1929, King Alfonso XIII signed the first royal decree García de los Reyes presented to him. Its aim was to rejuvenate the Navy's top leadership by reducing the mandatory retirement age for high-ranking naval officers by four years, dropping it to 68 for the rank of vicealmirante (vice admiral), 64 for contralmirante (rear admiral), and 62 for capitán de navío (ship-of-the-line captain).
- On 14 January 1929, another royal decree he championed established promotions in certain categories in the navy by selection, as was the practice in other modern navies. Previously, the most senior officer at the lower rank had advanced automatically without review or regard to his accomplishments.
- He restructured the commissioned officer corps by dividing them into civil-administrative and "civil-military" branches. At the same time, he canceled a planned staff expansion and reinstated the Shore Establishment roster.
- He redistributed ships among naval bases to make better use of naval forces, especially with regard to small vessels such as torpedo boats and coastal patrol vessels, both along the coast of Spain and in the waters of Spain's African colonies of Río Muni and Fernando Po.
- He obtained funding from the Spanish government to build the seven destroyers of the second series of the Churruca class, a significantly improved and more modern version of the seven-ship first series. This initiative resulted in the construction of the destroyers Almirante Antequera, Almirante Miranda, Gravina, Escaño, Ulloa, Jorge Juan, and Císcar.
- He championed a royal order that created the Álvaro de Bazán Prize, established to encourage the writing and publication of articles in the Revista General de Marina (General Naval Review)

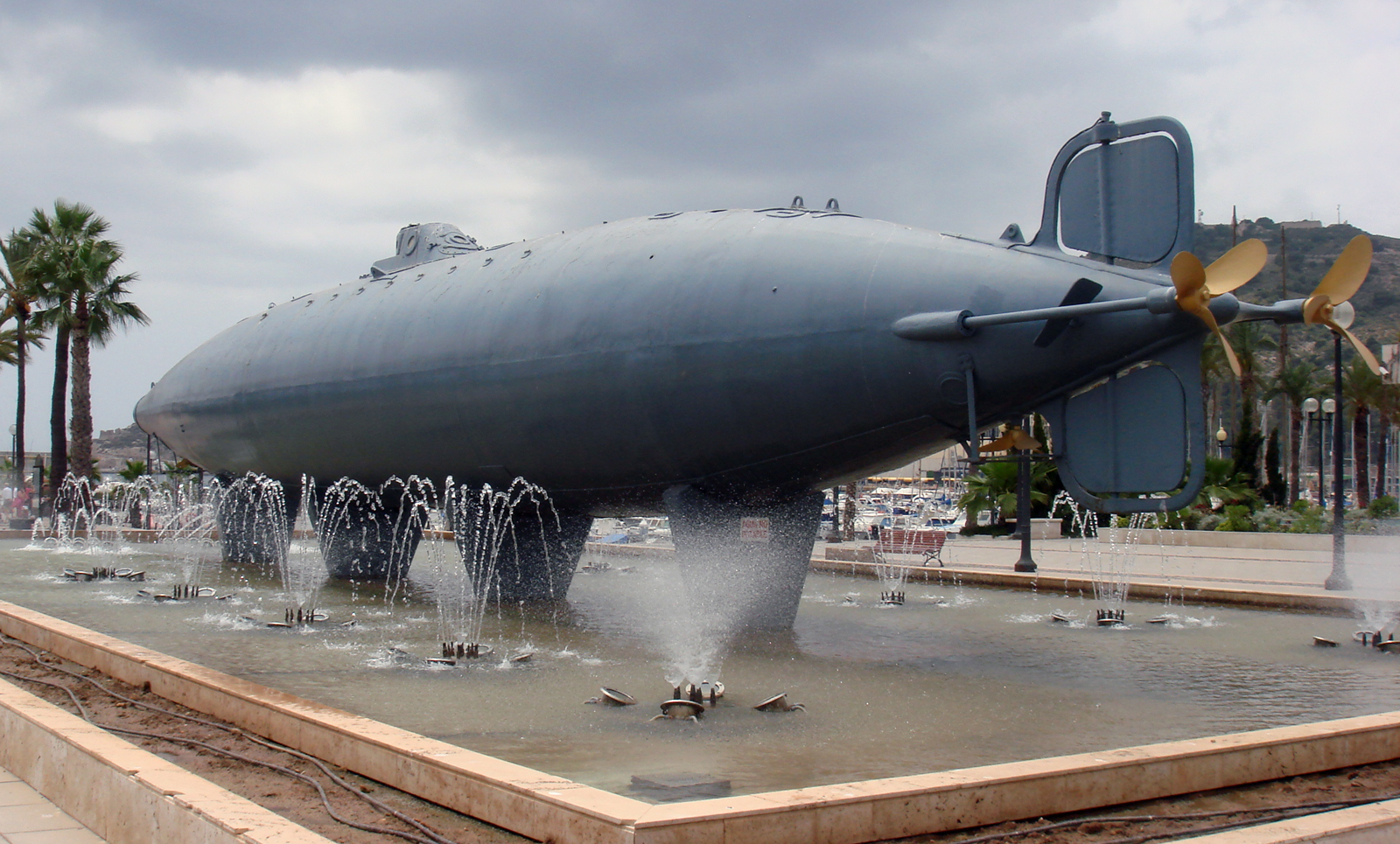
The 19th-century Spanish experimental submarine Peral, preserved at Cartagena, Spain, on 23 May 2007.

- For 40 years, Spain's first submarine, the experimental 19th-century vessel Peral, had lain derelict at the Arsenal de La Carraca at San Fernando. The Captain General of the Cartagena Maritime Department, Pedro Mercader Zufía, warned García de los Reyes that Peral might be scrapped, and he recommended that she be moved to Cartagena — where Peral′s inventor, Isaac Peral, was buried — and preserved there. García de los Reyes agreed, abd in 1929 he had Peral towed to the Cartagena Naval Base, where her hull was repaired and she was installed on the esplanade of the Submarine Base., where she remained until 1965.

In mid-1929, García de los Reyes visited Cuba to represent the Government of Spain at the inauguration of Gerardo Machado for a second term as president of Cuba. In the autumn of 1929, the largest Spanish Navy maneuvers of the modern era took place under his ministry, which involved the entire fleet and its aircraft and took place in the Mediterranean Sea. From aboard the new Trasmediterránea passenger-cargo ship Infanta Cristina, King Alfonso XIII, Queen Victoria Eugenie, and the entire Primo de Rivera government witnessed the maneuvers, which culminated in an impressive naval review, led by the training ship Juan Sebastián de Elcano, a barquentine which had entered service in 1928.

The Primo de Rivera government ended with Primo de Rivera's resignation on 28 January 1930. Dámaso Berenguer became prime minister and relieved García de los Reyes of his post as Minister of the Navy on 30 January 1930. On 31 January 1930, García de los Reyes's successor as minister, Salvador Carvia y Caravaca, placed him in an unassigned availability status in the Spanish Navy. Shortly afterwards García de los Reyes withdrew from public life.

On 14 April 1931, the Second Spanish Republic was proclaimed, replacing the Kingdom of Spain, and the Spanish Navy came under the republic's control as the Spanish Republican Navy. García de los Reyes retired from the navy on 29 October 1931 and went into a reserve status. Banished from Madrid by the Republican government because of his monarchist past, he resided in Bilbao until 1934, when he moved to Madrid to live in his nephew's house so as to avoid returning to his own home there. He lived quietly in retirement.

=== Imprisonment and execution ===
The leftist Popular Front won the election of 16 February 1936. On 17 July 1936, a partially successful right-wing coup d'état took place, beginning the Spanish Civil War, with Nationalist forces under Francisco Franco opposing Republican forces which remained loyal to the Second Spanish Republic. The Red Terror soon began in Republican-controlled portions of Spain, including Madrid, as the Republican government lost control of its more extreme elements. Betrayed by a janitor at the Ministry of the Navy, García de los Reyes, although he had retired from public life several years earlier, was arrested at the age of 64 along with his nephew by a Republican checa shortly after the war began because of his suspected Nationalist sympathies. He was imprisoned in the General Porlier Prison in Madrid for several months. As Nationalist forces neared Madrid in November 1936, the leftists began executing the imprisoned Spanish Army and Navy officers in what became known as the Paracuellos massacres. García de los Reyes's turn came on 24 November 1936, when he was among an estimated 159 army and navy officers transported by truck to Paracuellos de Jarama and executed by firing squad there. His body was among those thrown into three mass graves, where his remains could not be identified.

== Publications ==
- Teoría práctica de las conmutatrices ("Practical Theory of Commutators"), Madrid, 1902
- Various articles in Revista general de Marina on radiotelegraphy, electricity, navigation, and submarines.

== Awards and decorations ==
=== Spanish ===
- Medalla Naval (Navy Medal)
- Cross of Naval Merit with Red Distinction
- Cross of Naval Merit with White Distinction

=== Foreign ===
- Knight Grand Cross of the Order of Aviz (Kingdom of Portugal).
- Commander Grand Cross of the Order of the Sword (Kingdom of Sweden)
- Grand Cross of the Order of Saint Sava (Kingdom of Yugoslavia)
- Grand Cross of the Order of Carlos Manuel de Céspedes (Republic of Cuba)
- Commander of the Order of the Crown of Italy (Kingdom of Italy)
- Commander of the Order of Saints Maurice and Lazarus (Kingdom of Italy)

== Commemoration ==
After García de los Reyes′s death, the Spanish Navy rejected proposals to name a submarine after him three times. Finally, when the United States Navy transferred the Balao-class submarine USS Kraken (SS-370) to the Spanish Navy — the first submarine Spain acquired through American aid — on 25 October 1959, she was renamed Almirante García de los Reyes (briefly with the pennant number E-1, soon changed to S-31), in accordance with Ministerial Order No. 1313/59, published in Diario Oficial (Official Gazette) No. 98 of 30 April 1959.

On 1 February 1980, coinciding with events held at the Spanish Navy's Submarine Base to commemorate the 65th anniversary of the creation of the Spanish submarine force, García de los Reyes's son unveiled a bust of García de los Reyes, the first commander of the force, at the Submarine Base.

The submarine Almirante García de los Reyes was decommissioned in 1981 after more than 21 years of service in the Spanish Navy. She was stricken from the navy list on 1 April 1982. To avoid having García de los Reyes's name disappear from the navy, the Spanish Navy's Submarine School was renamed the Almirante García de los Reyes Submarine School as of 1 April 1982.

On 13 January 2012, when the Spanish Navy assigned names to its S-80 Plus-class submarines, the fourth of the class received the name Mateo García de los Reyes (S-84) in honor of García de los Reyes. Mateo García de los Reyes was laid down in 2011, with her commissioning scheduled for 2029.
