= Marcha Real =

National anthem of Spain

English: "Royal March"
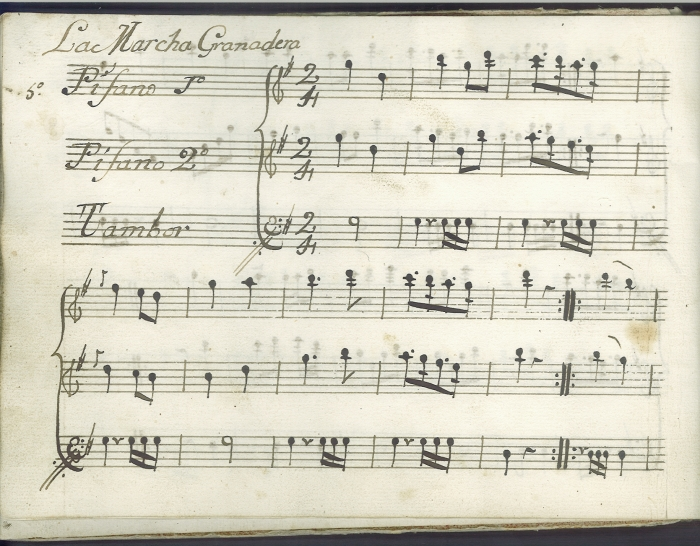
- 1761 sheet music
- National anthem of Spain
- Also known as: "La Marcha Granadera" (English: "The Grenadier March")
- Music: Manuel de Espinosa de los Monteros, 1761; 265 years ago, Bartolomé Pérez Casas (orchestration, 1908), Francisco Grau (harmonization, 1997)
- Adopted: 3 September 1770
- Readopted: 1823; 1874; July 1942
- Relinquished: 7 April 1822; 1873; 9 December 1931

1915 recording
1915 rendition recorded at Odeon Records, Barcelona

1998 recording
1998 rendition performed by the United States Navy Band

The "Marcha Real" (IPA: [ˈmaɾtʃa reˈal]; lit. 'Royal March'), or officially the "Marcha Real Española" (lit. 'Spanish Royal March') or the "Marcha Granadera" (lit. 'Grenadier March'), is the national anthem of Spain. It is one of only three national anthems in the world—along with those of Bosnia and Herzegovina and Kosovo—that have no official lyrics. Although many different lyrics have been made for it in the past, it has never had official lyrics as a national anthem, unlike most.

Franco-era instrumental recorded in the mid-1950s

== History ==
One of the oldest in the world, the Spanish national anthem was first printed in a document dated 1761 and entitled Libro de la Ordenanza de los Toques de Pífanos y Tambores que se tocan nuevamente en la Ynfantª Española (Book of the Ordinance of Newly Played Military Fife and Drum Calls by The Spanish Infantry), by Manuel de Espinosa. There, it is entitled La Marcha Granadera (English: The Grenadier March). According to the document, Manuel de Espinosa de los Monteros is the composer.

It was claimed in 1861 that the anthem had been composed by Frederick II of Prussia, a great lover of music. The claim was published as fact in the periodical La España militar (Military Spain). In 1864, Col. Antonio Vallecillo published the story in the diary El Espíritu Público (The Public Spirit), claiming a supposed Prussian origin for Marcha Real. According to Vallecillo, the anthem was a gift from Frederick II to the Count of Colomera, who was serving in the Prussian Court to learn the military tactics developed by Frederick II's army, under orders of King Charles III. In 1868, this spurious history was published in Los Sucesos, changing the beneficiary of the gift to the Count of Aranda. The myth was picked up in different publications of 1884 and 1903 until it was included in 1908 in the Enciclopedia Espasa.

In 1770, Charles III declared the Marcha de Granaderos the official Honor March, an act that formalized the tradition of playing it in public, especially on solemn occasions. It became the official Spanish anthem during Queen Isabella II's reign.

In 1870, after the 1868 Revolution, General Juan Prim organized a national contest to create a new official state anthem, and a jury consisting of three well-known composers was chosen to designate a winning entry. Although over 400 compositions were submitted, including those written by the young composers Federico Chueca, Ruperto Chapí and Tomás Bretón, a new anthem was never selected. After extensive deliberations, the jury had advised that Marcha de Granaderos was already considered the country's official anthem, and the contest was suspended. By Alfonso XIII's time, the Royal Circular Order of 27 August 1908 established the musical score orchestrated by Bartolomé Pérez Casas, Superior musician of the Royal Corps of Halberdier Guards, as the official version; it is known traditionally as the Grenadier March or the Royal Spanish March. During the Spanish Second Republic the Himno de Riego was adopted as the anthem of the republic.

The current symphonic version of the Marcha Real that replaced the Pérez Casas one was written by Francisco Grau. It has been the official version since a Royal Decree of 10 October 1997, when the Kingdom of Spain bought the author rights of the Marcha Real, then belonging to Pérez Casas's heirs. According to the Royal Decree 1560/1997, it should be in the key of B-flat major and a tempo of 76 bpm (♩=76), with a form of AABB and a duration of 52 seconds.

== Current version ==
The current official version of Marcha Real, as described in Royal Decree 1560/1997, is a sixteen-bar long phrase, divided in two sections, each one is made up of four repeated bars (AABB form).

The long, complete version is the honours music for the King, while a shorter version is performed for the Princess of Asturias, the President of the Government of Spain, or during sporting events.

There are also three official arrangements: one for orchestra, another for military band, and a third for organ, written by Francisco Grau and requested by the Government of Spain. In total, there are six different official adaptations, for each arrangement and length. They all were recorded by the Spanish National Orchestra and the Spanish Royal Guard Band as an official recording and released on compact disc for a limited period of time.

=== Copyright issues ===
As the harmonisation of Marcha Real was written by Pérez Casas in the early 20th century, the copyright has not yet expired. The government bought it from Pérez Casas' estate in 1997 for 130 million pesetas (781,316 euros) to avoid future legal problems. Until it expires, the copyright belongs to the Ministry of Culture and collecting societies charge copyright fees, which has led to criticism.

As a result, many different harmonisations have been devised by performers to avoid paying. Nonetheless, the rights to the 1997 Francisco Grau revision were transferred to the government at no charge, but they were not placed in the public domain.

== Music ==
Piano sheet music of Marcha Real

== Lyrics ==
Though the Marcha Real has no official lyrics, words have been written and used for it in the past. One version was used during Alfonso XIII's reign and another during the Francoist State; however, none of them were ever made official. The national anthem has been played without words since 1978 when lyrics that had been approved by General Francisco Franco were abandoned. Occasionally the Francoist lyrics have been erroneously performed after their abandonment.

=== Lyrics competition ===
After witnessing a rendition of "You'll Never Walk Alone" at Anfield in 2007, the President of the Spanish Olympic Committee (COE), Alejandro Blanco, said he felt inspired to seek lyrics to La Marcha Real ahead of Madrid's bid to host the 2016 Olympic Games. That same year Telecinco, enticed by the COE, organized a national contest and posted 25 different lyrics on their website which they thought best matched COE's requirements. The winner was chosen, although only 40,000 people voted. The lyrics by Enrique Hernández-Luike, magazine publisher and poet, spoke of freedom, peace and the Constitution. The winning lyrics were sung by the Ronda de Aranzueque choir in Pastrana, and filmed by German television. However, the COE organized a new competition for the lyrics, which resulted in between 2,000 and 7,000 entries (depending on source). A private team of jurors chose the entry by Paulino Cubero, then unemployed. The new lyrics received criticism, resulting in them being pulled only five days later, and the idea was scrapped indefinitely.

== Former lyrics ==
=== Lyrics during Alfonso XIII's reign ===
These lyrics were written by Eduardo Marquina (1879–1946) on the occasion of Alfonso XIII's silver wedding anniversary. They were never made official.

La bandera de España (Coro)
Gloria, gloria, corona de la Patria,
soberana luz
que es oro en tu Pendón.
Vida, vida, futuro de la Patria,
que en tus rojos es
abierto corazón...!
Púrpura y oro: bandera inmortal;
en tus colores, juntas, carne y alma están.
Púrpura y oro: querer y lograr;
Tú eres, bandera, el signo del humano afán.

España guiadora (Solo)
¡Pide, España! ¡Tu nombre llevaremos
donde quieras tú;
que honrarlo es nuestra ley!
¡Manda, España, y unidos lucharemos,
porque vivas tú,
sin tregua pueblo y rey!
Una bandera gloriosa nos das;
¡nadie, viviendo, España, nos la arrancará!
Para que, un día, nos pueda cubrir,
¡danos, España, el gozo de morir por ti!

¡Viva España!... (Coro)
¡Viva España! Del grito de la Patria,
la explosión triunfal
siguió su rumbo al sol;
¡Viva España! repiten veinte pueblos
y al hablar dan fe
del ánimo español...
¡Marquen arado martillo y clarín
su noble ritmo al grito de la Patria fe!
¡Guíe la mente a la mano hasta el fin,
al "Viva España" asista toda España en pie!

Flag of Spain (Chorus)
Glory, glory, crown of the Fatherland
sovereign light
which in your banner is gold.
Life, life, future of the Fatherland,
which in your reds is
an open heart
Purple and gold: immortal flag;
in your colors, together, flesh and soul are.
Purple and gold: to want and to achieve;
You are, flag, the sign of human effort.

Spain guiding (Solo)
Ask of us, Spain! Your name we will take
anywhere you want;
because to honor it is our law!
Command us, Spain, and united we will fight,
because you live,
relentless people and king!
You give us a glorious flag;
Nobody, who is alive, Spain, will take it from us!
So that, one day, we can be covered by it,
Give us, Spain, the joy of dying for you!

Long live Spain! ... (Chorus)
Long live Spain! At the cry of the Fatherland,
the triumphant explosion
opened a path to the sun;
Long live Spain! Repeated twenty peoples
and when they speak they have faith
in the Spanish will ...
Mark plow hammer and bugle
your noble rhythm at the cry of the Fatherland faith!
Guide the mind and the hand until the end,
the "Long Live Spain" Spain attends all standing!

=== Carlist Lyrics ===
Unofficial version of the anthem by the Carlists, a rival Monarchist faction to the Alfonsonites.

Viva España,
gloria de tradiciones,
con la sola ley
que puede prosperar.

Viva España,
que es Madre de naciones
con Dios, Patria, Rey,
¡con que supo imperar!

Guerra al perjuro
traidor y masón,
que con su aliento impuro
hundo la nación.

Es su bandera
la historia de su gloria;
por ella dará
su vida el español.

Fe verdadera
que en rojo de amor
aprisiona briosa
un rayo de sol.

Long live Spain,
glory of traditions
with the only law,
which she can prosper.

Long live Spain,
who is Mother of nations
with God, Fatherland, King,
with which she knew how to reign!

War with the perjurer,
traitor and freemason,
who with his impure breath
sank the nation.

It's her flag
the history of its glory;
For her, the Spaniard
must give his life.

Truthful Faith
which in red of love
spiritual prison
a sun's ray.

=== Franco-era lyrics ===
Lyrics were adapted from an earlier version on 1928 written by José María Pemán (1897–1981) during the reign of Alfonso XIII and the government of Miguel Primo de Rivera. The changes, made by Peman himself, intended to fit the symbols of the extreme right-wing ideology of General Francisco Franco, referred to as National Catholicism, which were the "salute with the extended right arm" and the "yoke and arrows". The yoke and arrows were the appropriated symbol of Falangism in Spain.

There were no singular official lyrics at the time, though they became popular in certain contexts. In fact, the school textbook "Enciclopedia Álvarez" featured different lyrics that were taught to children.

La Marcha Granadera
¡Viva España!
Alzad los brazos,
hijos del pueblo español,
que vuelve a resurgir!

Gloria a la Patria,
que supo seguir,
sobre el azur del mar,
el caminar del Sol.

¡Triunfa España!
Los yunques y las ruedas
cantan al compás
del himno de la fe.

Juntos con ellos,
cantemos de pie,
la vida nueva y fuerte
de trabajo y paz.

¡Viva España!
Alzad los brazos
hijos del pueblo español,
que vuelve a resurgir!

Gloria a la patria,
que supo seguir,
sobre el azur del mar,
el caminar del sol.

The Grenadier March
Long live Spain!
Raise your arms,
sons of the Spanish people,
who rise again!

Glory to the Fatherland,
who knew to follow,
over the azure main,
the path of the Sun.

Triumph Spain!
The anvils and the wheels
sing to the rhythm
of the anthem of faith.

Together with them,
let's sing standing,
of new and strong life
of labor and peace.

Long live Spain!
Raise your arms,
sons of the Spanish people,
who rise again!

Glory to the Fatherland,
who knew to follow,
over the azure main,
the path of the Sun.

== Interpretation and etiquette ==
Military bands of the Spanish Armed Forces, the National Police Corps of Spain, civilian marching bands and concert bands play the B flat-major version of the anthem adapted for wind bands (as arranged by Francisco Grau), and playing the A major version is optional.

The bugle call To the Colors in Spain is the version played by bugle bands in Spanish churches on religious occasions and processions organized by civil groups and the parishes. Various versions adapted for the drum and the bugle are used, even though brass instruments play the anthem as well. But in some bugle bands, the A flat version of the anthem (the old official one, adapted for the bugle) is played. Only a bugle call is sounded when the B flat version is played.

Being the national anthem, and played in honor of the King and the Queen of Spain, it is common for all to stand once it is played. Even though it is also played in church events, respect for the royal family is required by everyone in attendance; civilians stand at attention, and those in uniform salute when not in formation.

== See also ==
- Anthems of the autonomous communities of Spain
