= Enrique Hernández-Luike =

Spanish magazine publisher and poet (1928–2022)

Enrique Hernández-Luike (27 July 1928 – 13 February 2022) was a Spanish magazine publisher and poet and the great-grandson of Polish photographer Conde de Lipa.

== Publishing career ==
Luike was born in Huelva, Spain. He started his publishing career at the early age of 13, with the publication of a program for Easter in Seville titled "Lágrimas y Claveles". After many years working as a journalist for different newspapers and radio stations, Hernández-Luike created the news agency Motor-Press in 1956. The next year, he acquired the motorbike magazine Motociclismo. In 1961, Luike started Autopista, a car weekly. By 1975, Motor-Press published over twenty different magazine titles.

In 1978, Luike-motorpress was formed by the merger of the West German company Vereinigte Motor Verlage and Motor-Press. In the following twenty years, Luike-motorpress added new titles to the previous ones (Motociclismo, Autopista, Auto Mecánica, La Moto and Automóvil), Autoverde, Autovía, Avión Revue, Bicisport, Bike, Coche Actual, Motor Clásico, Moto Verde and Navegar. In 1993, Luike-motorpress expanded to Portugal, México, Argentina, and Brasil. In partnership with Televisa, the company launched Automóvil Panamericano in Mexico in 1995. Juan Hernández-Luike, one of Hernández- Luike's sons, managed the new magazine for the first few years. By 1998, Luike-motorpress was the largest motor-related magazine publisher in Spain and the German group, which owned 51 percent of Luike-motorpress, bought the remaining 49 percent from Hernández-Luike and his family.

Hernández-Luike published Tribuna, a weekly general interest magazine, for a few years then, in 2001, he returned to motor publishing by joining Ediaction News, a publishing house founded by Javier Herrero—a motorcycling journalist and Luike's brother-in-law. Under his leadership, Ediaction News's Autofácil magazine became the sales leader among car magazines in Spain in 1992.

In 2004, Ediaction News partnered with Editorial Prensa Ibérica to create LUIKE Iberoamericana de Revistas (LIDER). LIDER published Autofácil, Car & Tecno, Fórmula Moto, Quad & Jet, Todo Terreno, and others. LIDER partnered with Dennis Publishing to bring the magazine evo to Spain in 2016—Car & Tecno magazine became evo magazine.

The book LUIKE: Historia del Motor en España desde 1956 was published in 2016 detailing Hernández-Luike's 60-year career as a motor journalist.

As of mid-2018 Hernández-Luike was the founding president of LIDER which published the print magazines Autofácil, evo, Moto Catálogo, Scooting, Todo Terreno and the online magazines Fórmulamoto and Autofacil. His son, Juan Hernández-Luike, is CEO.

Luike awards the annual Estrellas Luike del Motor (Luike Motor Stars) to the best-selling cars and motorbikes and to special personalities. Spanish motorbike champion Angel Nieto received one of these stars in 2018, posthumously. The blind astronomer Wanda Díaz-Merced has also received a star.

== Racing career ==
Besides publishing about motorbikes, Hernández-Luike also raced them. In 1960, Virgilio Hernández Rivadulla and Hernández-Luike won the trophy for the most distance traveled at the Florence FIM Rally. The previous year, Luike and his team finished second in the Scarborough FIM Rally .

== Poet and lyricist ==
Hernández-Luike has published several poetry books, has won eight awards at the Festival of Song of Las Minas of La Union, the La Unión's Castillete de Oro, and has received the Antonio Machado Poetry Award from the Seville City Hall. In 2007, Hernández-Luike won the Telecinco contest to write the lyrics for the Spanish national anthem—the Marcha Real. The Spanish Olympic Committee had asked the TV station to organize a contest so that Spanish athletes could have words to sing at sporting events. Hernández-Luike lyrics were chosen after tallying 40,000 votes. The lyrics were sung by the Ronda de Aranzueque choir in Pastrana and filmed by German television.

=== Bibliography ===
- Coplas para Cante Flamenco. (La Carpeta de Pencho Cros). 2nd Edition. Fundación LUIKE, 2015. ISBN 8460815374.
- Ave Fénix, Effecto 2001 - Poemas íntimos. Paperback – Teleimagen, January 1, 2000. ASIN B001URP502.
- Poesías entre Paréntesis. Paperback – Luike-motorpress, December 31, 1992. ISBN 848602465X.

=== Discography ===
- 1988. Producer and writer of the lyrics for the album Misa Minera de La Unión.

== Death ==
Hernández-Luike died on 13 February 2022, at the age of 93.

== Awards ==
Hernández-Luike has received many journalism and industry awards. A selection of these awards is listed:

- 2024. Premio del Motor Ciudad de Jerez.
- 2022. Premio Honorífico de Periodismo por la Seguridad Vial
- 2022. Premio ANESDOR Manillar de Oro.
- 2019. La Leyenda Continúa 2019: premio Leyenda de Oro.
- 2018. Faconauto Communications Award.
- 2016. Named Adoptive Son of San Roque.
- 2011. Personaje Ilustre de la Automoción Española ASEPA (ASEPA Spanish Automotive Hall of Fame).
- 2010. Medalla al Mérito en el Trabajo.
- 2007. Won a national contest to write lyrics for the Spanish national anthem.
- 2001. Medalla de Honor Fundación RACE and Medalla de Oro Circuito de Jerez.
- 1991. La Vanguardia's Enrique La Calle International journalism contest winner, creador del Salón del Automóvil de Barcelona, otorgado por La Vanguardia.
