= F73 =

F73 may refer to:

- Birrana F73, a Formula Ford motor racing design
- Farman F.73, 1920s French passenger and mail transport aircraft, variant of the F.70
- HMS Eastbourne (F73)
- Spanish frigate Cataluna (F73), Spanish Navy frigate
