= Conde de Lipa =

Polish photographer

Conde de Lipa Luis Tarszenski, known as Conde de Lipa (Count of Lipa) (ca.1793 – October 24, 1871) was a Polish captain and photographer recognized for his participation in the November Uprising in Poland, and for his work as an early photographer and one of the first instructors of photography with his own photo schools in Spain. He was official photographer to the Queens of Spain and Portugal. Spanish poet and publisher Enrique Hernández-Luike was his great-grandson.

== Biography ==
Luis Tarszenski became a captain in the Polish army. In 1830, he formed part of the November Uprising against the Russian Czar Nicholas I of Russia, led by Piotr Wysocki

Along with thousands of émigrés, Tarszenski moved to France after the failed uprising.

By 1843 he lived in Seville (Sevilla), where he defended the city and Queen Isabel II from a siege by Antonio Wan-Halen, capturing two spies. That same year, he was named Knight of the Order of Isabel la Católica. The following year, he married Magdalena de Voisins in the Parish of San Vicente, Sevilla. In 1847 he moved to Málaga, where he opened the first daguerreotype studio of the city.

The Conde de Lipa was very involved in literary circles, and was the official photographer to both the Queen of Spain, Isabel II, and the Queen of Portugal, Maria II. In 1857, Pedro Antonio de Alarcón dedicates his novel '"¡Viva el Papa!" to Luis Tarszenski, Conde de Lipa. In 1861, he participated in one of the many literary circles in Seville, with the reading of the ode "To Poland". The following year he gave "an elegant moire and satin album, with several photographs of the Holy Face" to Queen Isabel II, with the occasion of her visit to Jaén.

By 1866 the Conde de Lipa was definitively the official photographer to Queen Isabel II, photographing the act of laying the first stone of the National Library of Spain in Madrid (Biblioteca Nacional de España en Madrid), on April 22, 1866 . He later offered these photos for sale in his studio. The newspaper La Iberia speaks of “the magnificent museum the photographer Count of Lipa has in Atocha street, number 18 (Madrid)″. The article also mentions the photographs he had taken of the collection of the Real Armería; however the photos preserved in the Spanish National Library of the Armería are labeled with Jean Laurent's company, which leads historians to believe Lipa's photographs ended in Laurent's collection.

In November 1867, he took the oldest image that is preserved of Cáceres, of the inauguration of the works of the City Council. The next year he took the first picture of Jesus Nazareno of Cáceres.

== See also ==
- November Uprising
- Jean Laurent
- Charles Clifford
- Enrique Hernández-Luike
