= Central Defence Academy =

- Coat of Arms of the Central Defence Academy
- Country: Spain
- Allegiance: Spain
- Branch: Common Corps of the Spanish Armed Forces; Joint Service
- Type: Training
- Role: Training of the future officers and NCOs of the Common Corps, Foreign Language Training, Educational Training

The Central Defence Academy (Spanish: Academia Central de la Defensa, ACD) is a military training center of the Common Corps of the Spanish Armed Forces located in the city of Carabanchel, Madrid. The center is responsible for providing specialization training to officers and non-commissioned officers in the Spanish Armed Forces and its service branches. The ACD consists of affiliate schools which specialize in areas of speciality in the Spanish Army (such as Legal, Audit, Health and Military Music) It was created in response to the provisions of the Royal Decree of King Felipe VI on 20 June 2014. It is regulated by the Order of the Ministry of Defense (MINISDEF) on 9 September 2015. The ACD reports directly to the General Directorate of Recruitment and Military Education of the Ministry of Defense. The director of the academy is an officer with the rank of general officer who also serves as the assistant director general of the Military Education Service

== Structure ==
The Central Defense Academy has the following structure:

- Headquarters
- Spanish Medical School (EMISAN)
- Military School of Legal Studies (EMEJ)
- Military Audit Corps School (EMI)
- Military School of Music (EMUM)
- Military School of Education Science (EMCE)
- Military School of Languages of the Spanish Armed Forces (EMID)
- University Defense Center (CUD Madrid)
- Department of Instruction and Training Intercentres
- Support Services Unit
- Economic Administration Service
