= Medalla Aérea =

Air Force Medal
- Front side of the Air Force Medal
- Type: Military decoration
- Awarded for: Distinguished peacetime service
- Country: Spain
- Eligibility: Military personnel only
- Status: Active
- Established: 2003

Precedence
- Next (higher): Cruz de Guerra (At War)
- Next (lower): Crosses of Aeronautical Merit
- Related: Medalla del Ejército; Medalla Naval

The Air Force Medal (Spanish: Medalla Aérea) is the highest military award of Spain in peacetime for the air force branch. The regulation for the issue of this medal is modified by the Royal Decree 1040/2003, 1 August (BOD. Núm. 177).

== Appearance ==
Is made of oxidized iron, oval, 42 millimetres (1.7 in) on its vertical axis and 28 millimetres (1.1 in) on its horizontal axis. On the obverse, surrounded by a silver edge, is a rising sun behind the sea and a matron stands, representing Spain, offering, with the right hand, a laurel wreath and holding a sword with the left. At the top of the oval are the words: "Al mérito distinguido". On the reverse is the emblem of the Air Force. The ribbon is 30 millimetres (1.2 in) wide and divided in three parts: the central with the national colours (red and yellow) and at the sides blue. Each medal has a clasp attached to the ribbon with the legend of the action done in black.
