= Military Music Corps of the Spanish Armed Forces =

- Cuerpo de Músicas Militares
- The Mounted Band of Timpani and Bugles on parade.
- Active: 1989–present
- Country: Spain
- Branch: Spanish Armed Forces
- Type: Military band service
- Size: Corps
- Garrison/HQ: Madrid

The Military Music Corps of the Spanish Armed Forces is responsible for performing military music at military ceremonies of the Spanish Armed Forces. It forms part of the Common Corps of the Spanish Armed Forces, along with the Military Legal Corps, the Intervention Corps, and the Medical Corps.

== History and description ==
This branch of the Army was created in 1989 with Law 17/89 Regulating the System of Professional Military Personnel, which centralized various branches of the Armed Forces for more efficient management. The emblem of this branch is a lyre surrounded by two veined and fruited oak branches, joined at their trunks and tied at the point.

Members of the Military Music Corps are grouped into senior and basic ranks: in the former they hold the ranks from lieutenant to lieutenant colonel, and in the latter from sergeant to chief warrant officer, to whose titles the term "musician" is added. Training for members of this corps takes place at the Military Music School, created in 2001 and located at the Matacán School Group military base in Madrid. Its function is to train members of the Armed Forces' music units and to teach their two fundamental specializations: conducting and instrumental performance.

== Units by region ==
Region	Name	Branch	Image
Andalusia	War Band of the Light Infantry Brigade "King Alfonso XIII" II of the Legion	Army	
Andalusia	Band of Music of the Southern Regional Command Battalion	Army	
Andalusia	Music Unit of the Tablada Air Base Group	Air and Space Force	
Andalusia	Music Unit of the Southern Third of the Navy	Navy	
Aragon	General Military Academy Band	Army	
Aragon	Music Unit of the Zaragoza Air Base Group	Air and Space Force	
Balearics	Music Unit of the Headquarters of the General Command of the Balearic Islands		
Canary Islands	Music Unit of the Canary Islands Sub-Inspectorate Headquarters		
Canary Islands	Music Unit of the Headquarters Group of the Canary Islands Air Command	Air and Space Force	
Castile and León	Band of the Headquarters Battalion of the "Brunete" Mechanized Division No. 1	Army	
Valencian Community	Military Music Unit of the High Readiness Land Headquarters	Army	
Galicia	Military Naval School Band	Navy	
Galicia	Music Unit of the Operational Logistics Force	Army	
Galicia	Music Unit of the Northern Marine Corps	Navy	
Madrid	Madrid Marine Infantry Group Music Band	Navy	
Madrid	School of Military Music		
Madrid	Music Unit of the General Directorate of the Civil Guard		
Madrid	Musical Unit of the Spanish Royal Guard	Royal Guard	
Madrid	Music Unit of the General Sub-Inspectorate of the Army No. 1. Center		
Madrid	Music Unit of the Central Air Command	Air and Space Force	
Madrid	Music Unit of the King's Inmemorial Regiment No. 1		
Melilla	Music Unit of the Headquarters Battalion of the General Command of Melilla		
Murcia	Music Unit of the General Air Command	Air and Space Force	
Murcia	Music Band of the Levante Tercio 1874		
Murcia	Music Unit of the Third of Levante of the Navy		
Castilla-La Mancha	Music Unit of the Infantry Academy		
Ceuta	Music Unit of the Headquarters Battalion of the General Command of Ceuta		

== See also ==
- Corps of Army Music
- Royal March
