= Francisco Grau =

Spanish musician, composer and general (1947–2019)

Francisco Grau Vegara (22 January 1947 – 21 July 2019) was a Spanish musician, composer and general in the Spanish Armed Forces.

== Career ==
Born in Bigastro, Alicante, he started playing instruments in his hometown's band at the age of seven. Later, he went on to compose more than 700 pieces and since 12 October 1997, he was the official arranger of the Spanish National Anthem (previously Marcha Granadera). He was also a member of the Real Academia de Bellas Artes de San Fernando in Madrid, the Real Academia de la Virgen de la Arrixaca in Murcia and the Academia de San Carlos in Valencia. From 1988 to 2019, he was the director of music for the Spanish Royal Guard and the Director of the Spanish Military Academy of Music since its creation. From 1988 – 2008, he was also director of the Musical Unit of the Spanish Royal Guard.

In January 2008, Grau became the first General of Music in the Spanish Armed Forces, having been made a colonel some years previously.

He died on 21 July 2019 in Albacete, aged 72.
