= Cruz de Guerra =

Spanish military award

War Cross
- Front side of the War Cross
- Type: Military decoration
- Awarded for: Distinguished combat valor
- Eligibility: Military personnel only
- Status: Active
- Established: 1938 / 2003 (Modified)

Precedence
- Next (higher): Military Medal
- Next (lower): Medalla del Ejército (Army); Medalla Naval (Navy); Medalla Aérea (Air Force)

The War Cross (Spanish: Cruz de Guerra) is a high military award of Spain to recognise battlefield bravery. This decoration aims to prize those who have realized actions or facts of great efficiency, or they have given excellent services, both with valour during a continued period, inside one armed conflicts or of military operations involving or could involve resort to force, and carrying military abilities or remarkable command skills.

The medal was established in 1938 (BOE. Núm. 526) and has four different types:

- Gran Cruz
- Cruz de Guerra para Jefes
- Cruz de Guerra para oficiales y suboficiales
- Cruz de Guerra para Cabos y Soldados

The Spanish War Cross is modified by the Royal Decree 1 Royal Decree 1040/2003, 1 August (Spanish Official Gazette No. 177) that reduced the categories to one, Cruz (Cross) establishing an insignia with a new design.
