= FIM Rally =

FIM Rally is an international annual motorbike gathering that also has a competitive side compared to usual mototourism events. The nations and bike clubs compete in various fields e.g. covering the longest distance coming to the Rally (Norway Challenge), having most motorbikes with engine displacement from 125 cc to 250 cc (Bohemia Challenge) or having most bikers aged under 21 (Italia Challenge).

== What is FIM Rally? ==
The annual international meeting of touring motorbike users organised by the International Motorcycling Federation (FIM). The FIM Rally is the most important meeting in the annual tourism calendar of FIM events (based in Switzerland http://www.fim-live.com).

This is a meeting of about 2,000 motorcycle touring fans from more than 30 countries. The rally normally takes several days, during which the participants share their passion for motorcycles and their motorcycle experience, as well as visit the surroundings of the location that hosts the rally. Each succeeding rally is held in another country in order to give the opportunity to each hosts to show their diversity of culture, history and folklore. At the rally, you will be able to meet people not only from all around Europe but also tourists from, among other, the United States, Saudi Arabia, Tunisia, or Indonesia. The organization of the rally is a great honour for the country and, above all, for the host city.

== History ==
The first experimental touring motorcycle rally was held in 1935 in Brussels. It was organized by FIdCM (Federation Internationale des Club Motocyclistes), a counterpart of the contemporary FIM International Motorcycling Federation. The idea of the rally was well received by the motorcycling community. This prompted the founder to create a regular event. The FIM rally is a three-day event, held in the summer. The hosts of the events, during and before the official rally, organize excursions for the guests to present the values of their region and country. Very often, participants in the rally from the same country would meet earlier and travel in convoy, dressed in club colours. This is undoubtedly an additional attraction of the event.

The first official FIM Rally was held in 1936 in Berlin. There were one hundred participants from as many as 11 different countries, including 13 motorcyclists from Poland. The next rallies were successively hosted in France (1937), the Czech Republic (1938) and Switzerland (1939). The outbreak of war halted the FIM Rally for ten years. The first post-war rally took place in 1950 in the Netherlands. Shortly after the war, the rally took place in Western Europe only, even though there were participants from the East. However, the division of Europe by the Iron Curtain has somewhat weakened the popularity of the rally. In 1957, the rally was organised in communist Poland. In later years, Poland has been elected to act as the initiator of the meeting three more times. This makes the country the second most frequent FIM Rally host, next to Germany, France, Switzerland and Spain. After a very successful first visit to Poland, the authorities of the Federation look towards the East more boldly and decided that the next stop for the meeting would be Yugoslavia. Four years later, the rally was hosted by the USSR. Many of the participants of those meetings still recall with sentiment the abstract situations caused by the huge bureaucracy and their culture shock. Poland was also fondly remembered by the participants of the rally. They remembered it as a hospitable and inexpensive country. For the participants in those times, visiting those countries was an exotic journey. Equally exotic was the first rally organised outside Europe – in Tunisia](1996). Some participants of contemporary rallies have participated in 20, 30 or even 40 such events. They emphasize, that what attracts them to the rally is an opportunity to visit foreign countries, other cultures and, above all, to meet people with a shared passion.

== FIM Rally 2012 ==
In 2012, Poland will host the meeting for the fifth time. The city of Bydgoszcz will welcome the foreign tourists. In previous years, the participants of the FIM Rally have already visited such cities as Olsztyn, Kraków (twice) and Lublin. The meeting will be held in Bydgoszcz thanks in part to the large effort of the members of the Wyczół Gościeradz, who have participated in the FIM Rallies since 2005. The rally in Bydgoszcz will be organised by the head of the club – Bartosz Zwolanowski, who has been enchanted by the idea and atmosphere of those meetings. The meeting in Bydgoszcz was held from 19 to 21 July, and its base was located in the exhibition area of LPKiW Myślęcinek. On the first day, the participants were due tol present their bikes in Wyspa Młyńska; on the second day, a trip to Toruń; on the last day, a parade of nations, consisting of all the participants will ride through the streets of Bydgoszcz.

== See also ==
- Sport touring
