= Medalla Naval =

Navy Medal
- Front side of the Navy Medal
- Type: Military decoration
- Awarded for: Distinguished peacetime service
- Country: Spain
- Eligibility: Military personnel only
- Status: Active
- Established: 2003

Precedence
- Next (higher): Cruz de Guerra (At war)
- Next (lower): Crosses of Naval Merit
- Related: Medalla Aérea; Medalla del Ejército

The Navy Medal (Spanish: Medalla Naval) is the highest peacetime military award issued by Spain's navy. The regulation for the issue of this medal is modified by the Royal Decree 1040/2003, 1 August (BOD. Núm. 177).

== Appearance ==
Is made of oxidized iron, oval, 42 millimetres (1.7 in) on its vertical axis and 28 millimetres (1.1 in) on its horizontal axis. On the obverse, surrounded by a silver edge, is a rising sun behind the sea and a matron stands, representing Spain, offering, with the right hand, a laurel wreath and holding a sword with the left. At the top of the oval are the words: "Al mérito distinguido". On the reverse is the emblem of the Navy. The ribbon is 30 millimetres (1.2 in) wide and divided in three parts: the central with the national colours (red and yellow) and at the sides dark blue. Each medal has a clasp attached to the ribbon with the legend of the action done in black.
