= Royal and Military Order of Saint Hermenegild =

Military honor and legion created by Ferdinand VII of Spain

- Arms of the Order

Awarded by King of Spain
- Type: Military order of merit
- Established: November 28, 1814; 211 years ago
- Motto: Award to military constancy
- Eligibility: Military personnel and Guardia Civil
- Status: Currently awarded
- Sovereign: Felipe VI
- Grand Chancellor: Miguel Ángel Villarroya

Precedence
- Next (higher): Mention in Dispatches (Without Insignia); Distinguished Service Award (Without Insignia); Cross of Military Merit (Army); Cross of Naval Merit (Navy); Cross of Aeronautical Merit (Air Force)
- Next (lower): Long Military Service Cross

The Royal and Military Order of Saint Hermenegild (Spanish: Real y Militar Orden de San Hermenegildo) is both a general military honor and a legion created by King Ferdinand VII of Spain on 28 November 1814.

The Royal and Military Order of Saint Hermenegild is a military distinction of the Spanish Cavalry created by King Ferdinand VII of Spain at the conclusion of the Spanish War of Independence in 1814.

The purpose of the Order was to serve as a maximum means of reward for those soldiers who exceeded their military obligations and fought on, surpassing their suffering in battle, and who thus would serve as examples of bravery to His Spanish Majesty's armies.

Given the desire of the King to create a distinction of extraordinary rank, comparable to others traditional honours, it was decided to put the Order under the Patronage of Saint Hermenegild, who was the Visigoth King of Seville who was martyred in defence of the Christian faith in the sixth century and who is the patron saint of the Spanish Armed Forces.

Its first promulgation was published in 1815, being renewed later in 1860, 1879, 1951, 1994 and its most recent modernization in 2000.

... recompensar y distinguir a los oficiales generales, oficiales y suboficiales del Ejército de Tierra, de la Armada, del Ejército del Aire, de los Cuerpos Comunes de las Fuerzas Armadas y del Cuerpo de la Guardia Civil, por su constancia e intachable conducta en el servicio, a tenor de lo que establecen las Reales Ordenanzas para las Fuerzas Armadas.

It is declared that The Order intends "to compensate and to distinguish to the general officers, officers and warrant officers of the Spanish Army, Spanish Navy, Spanish Air Force, Common Corps and the Spanish Civil Guard, (the militarized police service depending on both Ministry of Interior and Ministry of Defense which holds different risponsabilities such Crime Investigation Department, Intelligence, Coast Guard, Fiscal and Borders responsibilities, Green Police, Public order and Security, Administrative Police, Traffic Police, Airborne Command, Scuba divers, weapons and firearms control etc among others) by their faultless and exemplary conduct in the service of The Crown."

The monarch of Spain is the Sovereign of the order. The Order is governed by three governing bodies: the Chapter, the Permanent Assembly and the Chancellery.

== Attribution ==
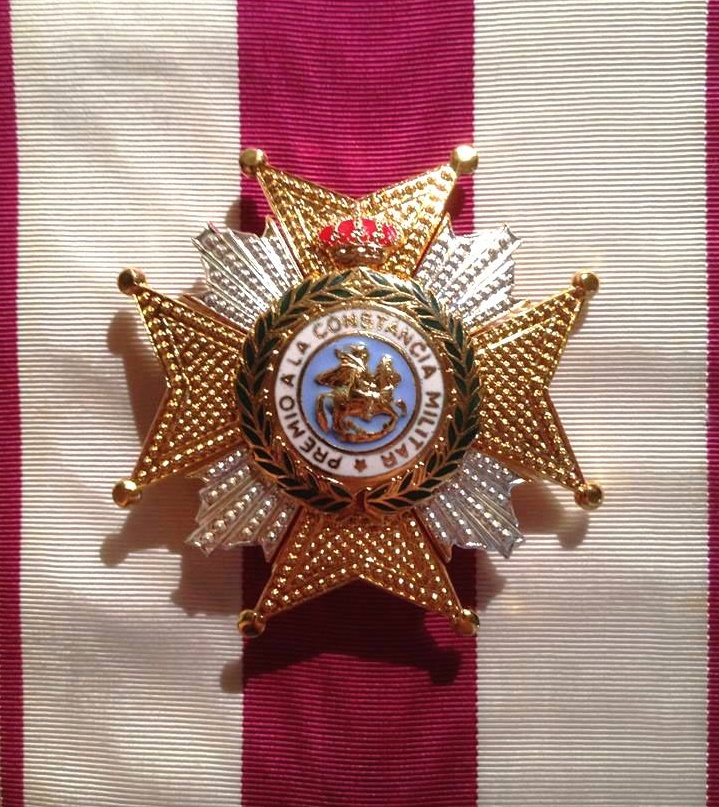
Badge of the Order.

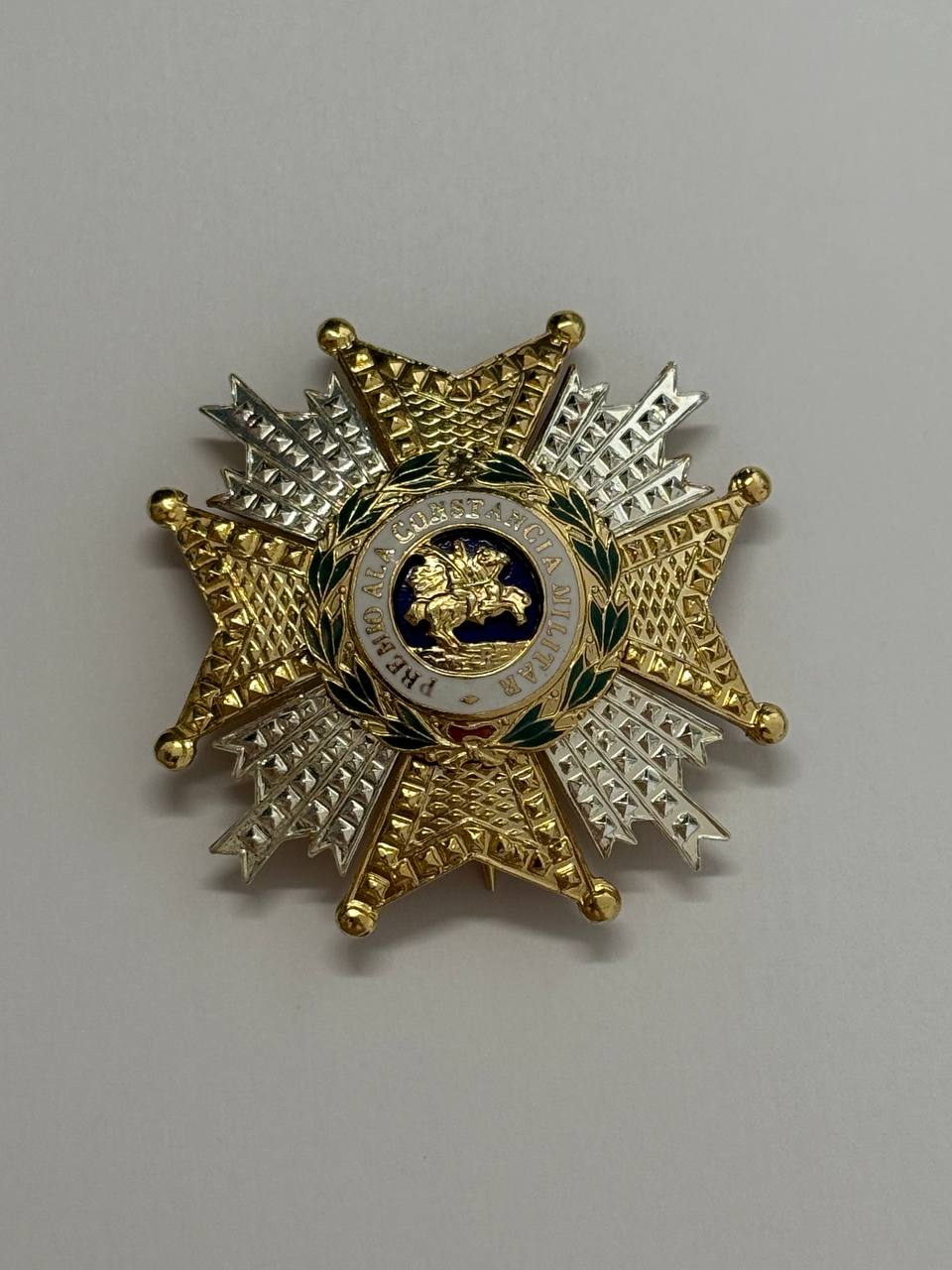
Order of Saint Hermenegild Commander with Star

According to its current statutes, the order is divided into four classes:

- Cross (Cruz) – worn on the chest, conferred to generals, admirals, other officers and warrant officers who have completed 20 years of service;
- Commander (Encomienda) – worn as a neck decoration, conferred as above after completion of 25 years of service;
- Commander with Star (Placa) – worn as a star on the left pocket of the uniform, conferred as above after completion of 30 years of service;
- Grand Cross (Gran Cruz) – worn on a sash over the right shoulder with a star on the left breast, conferred to generals and admirals who have completed at least 33 years of service;

== Insignia ==
The badge of the order is a gold, white enameled cross pattée, surmounted by a royal crown. The central medallion bears an effigy of St. Hermenegild on a horseback, surrounded by a blue ring inscribed "PREMIO A LA CONSTANCIA MILITAR" (reward for long military service). On the reverse there is the royal cypher of Fernando VII.

The star has the form of a gold Maltese cross with ball finials and silver rays between the arms and the effigy of St. Hermenegild in the central medallion, surrounded by a white ring with the order's motto and a green laurel wreath. The medallion of the Grand Cross star is surmounted by a royal crown.

Grand Cross (Gran Cruz)	Commander with Star (Placa)	Commander (Encomienda)	Cross (Cruz)

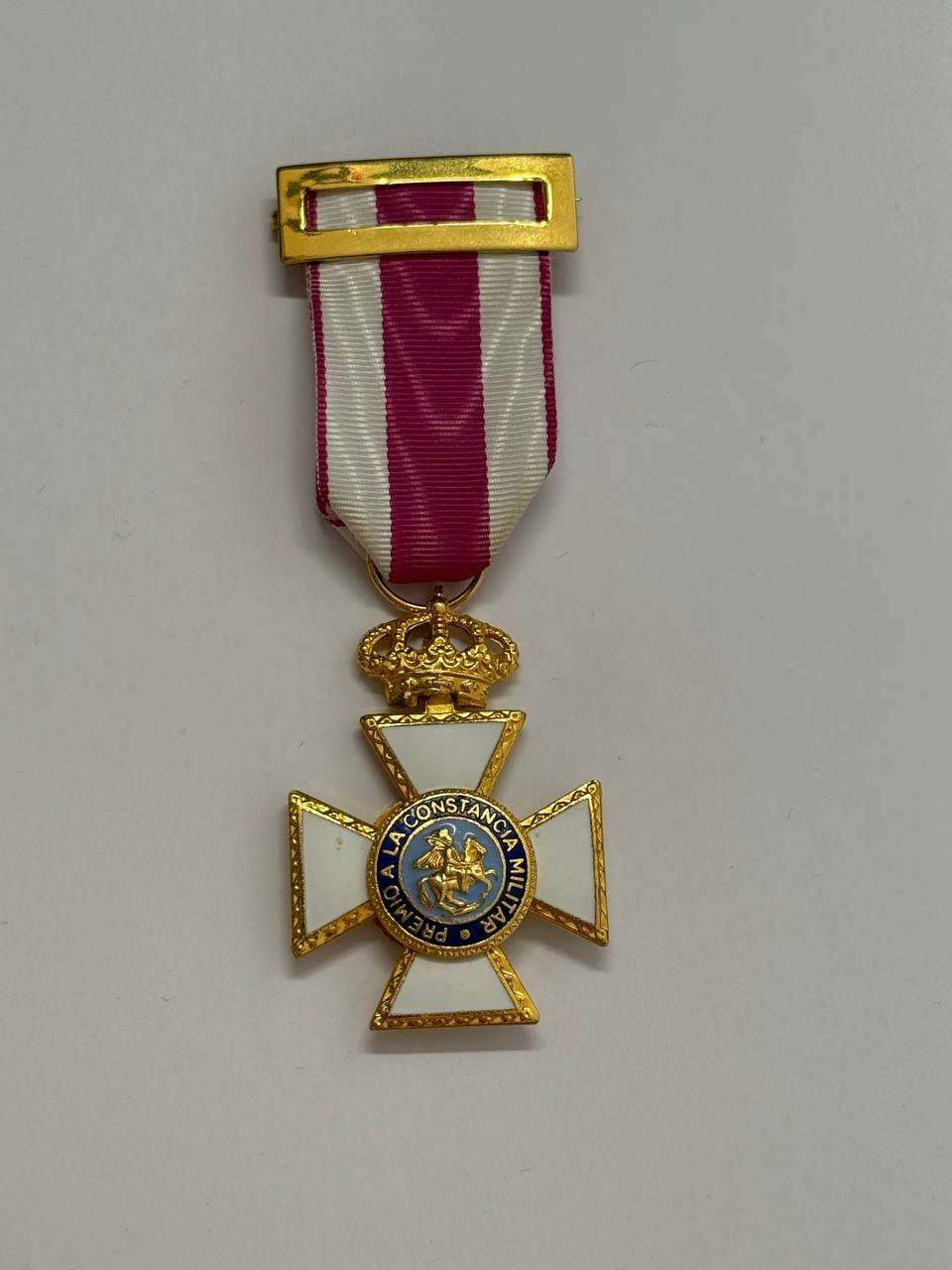
Order of Saint Hermenegild Cross

Ribbon Bars

Grand Cross	Commander with Star	Commander	Cross

== Sources ==
- "Real Decreto 725/2020, de 4 de agosto, por el que se aprueba el Reglamento de la Real y Militar Orden de San Hermenegildo" [Royal Decree 725/2020, of August 4, by which the Regulations of the Royal and Military Order of San Hermenegildo are approved] (in Spanish) – via www.boe.es.
