= Musical Unit of the Spanish Royal Guard =

Musical service in the Spanish Armed Forces

- Unidad musical de la Guardia Real España
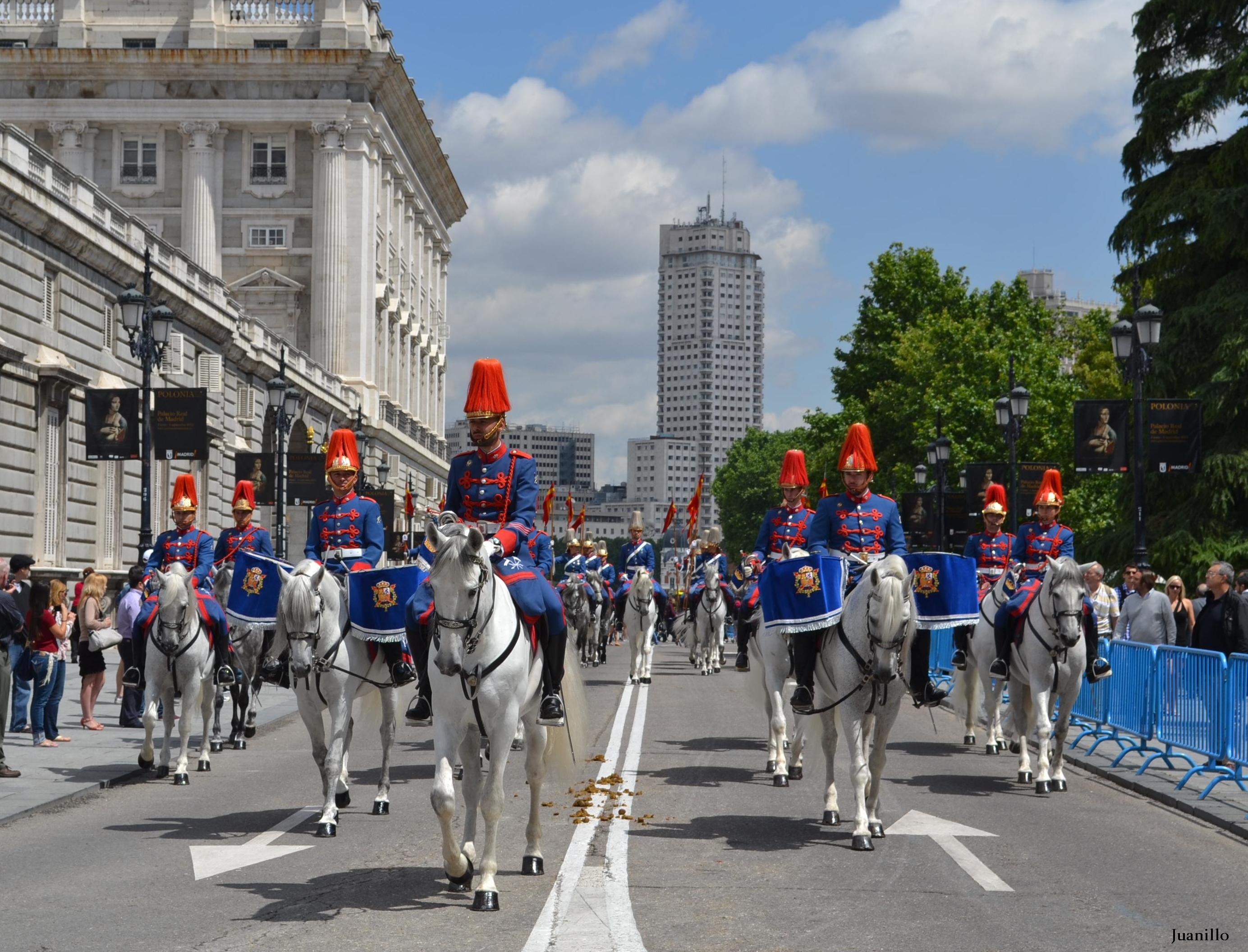
- The Mounted Band of Timpani and Bugles on parade.
- Active: 1998–present
- Country: Spain
- Allegiance: Felipe VI of Spain
- Branch: Spanish Armed Forces
- Type: Military band
- Size: battalion sized
- Part of: Spanish Royal Guard; Military Music Corps
- Garrison/HQ: Madrid
- March: Himno de la Guardia Real ("Hymn of the Royal Guards")
- Anniversaries: October 12

Commanders
- Current commander: Colonel Musician Enrique Damián Blasco Cebolla
- Notable commanders: Martín Elexpuru; Pérez Casas; Francisco Grau Vergara; Emilio Vega; López Calvo

The Musical Unit of the Spanish Royal Guard (Spanish: Unidad musical de la Guardia Real España) is the official music service of the Spanish Royal Guard of the Spanish Armed Forces that is dedicated to providing ceremonial honours and music to the King of Spain, the Spanish Royal Family, and public officials. The musical unit is one of many battalion sized units in the regiment, with over 100 professional musicians in its ranks who are chosen from the non-commissioned officers of the Military Music Corps. It is one of the more senior and representative bands in the Spanish Armed Forces, with its repertoire covering a wide range of Army, Navy and Air Force music. The entire unit is currently under the baton of the conductor of the Military Band of the Royal Guard, Colonel Musician Enrique Damián Blasco Cebolla.

== History ==
The Musical Unit of the Royal Guard was first organized as a singular musical group on February 19, 1874, with its first director being Martín Elexpuru. Its current structure dates back to 1998 and since then it has been constituted by the Symphonic Band, Marching Band and the Fife Section.

== Present Day ==
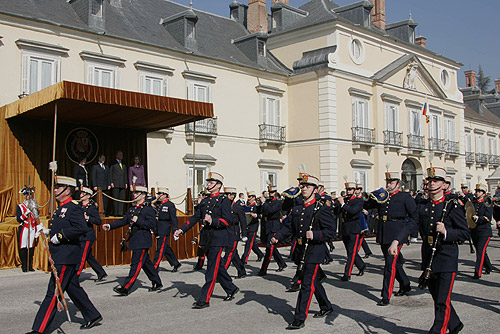
The Military Band of the Royal Guard during an official welcome ceremony hosted by King Juan Carlos I for Russian President Vladimir Putin.

Among their obligations are the following:

- Being present at military parades
- Honoring foreign heads of state on their state visits to Madrid
- Support the everyday ceremonial activities of the Regiment
- Take part in the guard mounting ceremony at the Royal Palace of Madrid every Wednesday from noon to 2pm
- Giving concerts at the Royal Palace on behalf of the regiment
- Performing drill at military tattoos domestically and internationally

The marching band has performed it precision marching drill throughout Europe, with notable performances being in London, Paris, Cologne, Bucharest, and Moscow.

== Recordings ==
- New Anthology of Military Music
- Concert of Military Music
- Soldiers for Peace
- Relay in the Palace
- Musical Memory of Spain
- Spain in Pasodobles
- Suspiros de España

== Organization ==
- Unit HQ and High Command
- Military Band of the Royal Guard of Spain
  - Marching Band
  - Symphonic Band
- Mounted Band of Timpani and Bugles, reports to the Royal Escort Squadron
- Corps of Drums (composed of Drums and bugles)
- Fife Section
- Pipe band
- Brass fanfare section
- Royal Guard Big band
- Royal Guard Chamber Ensemble

== List of directors ==
Name	Start date	End date
Mariano Rodríguez Rubio	1842	1857
Leopoldo Martín Elexpuru	1867	1868
Leopoldo Martín Elexpuru	1875	1893
Enrique Calvist Serrano	1894	1895
Eduardo López Juarranz	1896	1897
Bartolomé Pérez Casas	1897	1911
Emilio Vega Manzano	1911	1937
Luis Álvarez Martínez	1937	1939
Ricardo Vidal Tolosa	1957	1975
José López Calvo	1976	1988
Francisco Grau Vegara	1989	2007
Antonio Sendra Cebolla	2008	2010
Enrique Damián Blasco Cebolla	2010	2020
Armando Bernabeu Andreu	2020	TBD
