= Common Corps of the Spanish Armed Forces =

Part of the military of Spain

The Common Corps of the Armed Forces are Spanish military corps that are shared by all the branches of the Spanish Armed Forces providing specific professional expertise. The Common Corps are divided into four units; the Military Legal Corps (legal assistance), the Military Comptroller Corps (audit and accountability), the Military Health Corps (medical personnel) and the Military Bands Corps (military bands). Currently, 3,998 Officers and WOs make up the Common Corps. The educational centres of the Common Corps are part of the Central Defence Academy.

== History ==
Until the 1980s each of the branches of the Armed Forces had specific corps to undertake the tasks currently taken by the Common Corps. Due to operational reasons these corps were merged into the common corps that depend on the undersecretariat of the Ministry of Defence. In 1985 the Comptroller Corps were merged, in 1988 the Legal Corps were merged, and in 1989 the Medical and Bands Corps were merged.

== Gallery ==
Military Medical Corps

Military Legal Corps

Military Comptroller Corps

Military Band Corps
