= Cross of Aeronautical Merit =

Spanish military award

- Template of the Cross Aeronautical Merit decorations
- Type: Decoration of merit (formerly order of merit) (formerly Order of Aeronautical Merit)
- Presented by: Spain
- Eligibility: Military personnel, Guardia Civil, civilian personnel
- Post-nominals: MA
- Status: Currently awarded
- Established: 30 November 1945

Precedence
- Next (higher): Medalla Aérea
- Equivalent: Cross of Military Merit; Cross of Naval Merit
- Next (lower): Distinguished Service Award (Without Insignia); Mention in Dispatches (Without Insignia); Royal and Military Order of St Hermenegild

The Cross of Aeronautical Merit (Spanish: Cruces del Mérito Aeronáutico) is Spain's military award for gallantry or merit in the air. The award can be made in war or at times of peace. It is awarded to members of the Spanish Armed Forces, Guardia Civil or civilians.

== History and attribution ==
Established on 30 November 1945 by chief of state Francisco Franco as the Order of Aeronautical Merit (Spanish: Orden del Mérito Aeronáutico) and amended in 1976, 1995, 2003 and 2007. Awarded originally in three classes and a cross in silver for non-commissioned ranks, in 1995 it lost the rank of an order of merit and reduced to two and the number of categories extended to four.

According to the current regulations the decoration is conferred in the following classes:

- Grand Cross - to generals, admirals or civilian personnel of equivalent rank;
- Cross - to other officers, non-commissioned ranks or equivalent civilian personnel.

The categories are as follows:

- with Red Decoration (con distintivo rojo) - for courage, actions, deeds or service during an armed conflict or military operations that involve or may involve the use of armed force and may require significant military or command skills; since 2007 it can be awarded to for acts of gallantry while on an overseas mission and to soldiers fallen during such a mission;
- with Blue Decoration (con distintivo azul) - for actions, events or extraordinary services including operations resulting from a mandate of the United Nations or of other international organizations;
- with Yellow Decoration (con distintivo amarillo) - for actions, deeds or service that involve high personal risk and in cases of serious injury or death resulting from such actions or service;
- with White Decoration (con distintivo blanco) - for actions, deeds or distinguished service during missions of ordinary or extraordinary service in the armed forces or in connection with defense of the country.

Multiple awards of each class and each category to the same individual are possible.

== Insignia and ribbons ==
The decoration has the form of a Greek cross with the arms enameled red in the Red Decoration category and white in the remaining categories. The Blue Decoration and Yellow Decoration badges have an additional narrow bar in blue or yellow across the lower arm. The upper arm is surmounted by a Spanish royal crown and has a tablet to engrave the date of bestowal. The round central shield of the obverse bears the coat of arms of Castile, León, Aragon, Navarre and Granada (until 2003 only alternate coats of arms of Castile and León); in the middle there is a blue oval shield (escutcheon) of the House of Bourbon-Anjou. The central shield has gold wings extended to the lateral arms of the cross and is surmounted by a royal crown. On the reverse there are letters "MA" (Mérito Aeronáutico) on red background. The cross is worn on a ribbon on the left side of chest. Each subsequent award is denoted by a bar with the date of bestowal on the ribbon.

The Grand Cross has the same form as the cross described above but is worn on a sash over the right shoulder.

The star added to the class of Grand Cross is gilt, eight-pointed, with the cross superimposed on it; currently between the arms of the cross there are alternate towers (Castile) and lions (León).

| Grand Cross - Red Decoration | Grand Cross - Blue Decoration | Grand Cross - Yellow Decoration | Grand Cross - White Decoration |
| Cross - Red Decoration | Cross - Blue Decoration | Cross - Yellow Decoration | Cross- White Decoration |

== Recipients ==
- Alfonso XIII
- Felipe VI of Spain
- Leonor, Princess of Asturias
- Antonio Ibáñez Freire
- Asghar Khan
- Francisco Franco
- Michael E. Ryan

== See also ==
- Cross of Military Merit (Spain)
- Cross of Naval Merit (Spain)
