= Cross of Naval Merit =

Spanish military award

- Template of the Cross Naval Merit Decorations
- Type: Decoration of merit (formerly order of merit) (formerly Order of Naval Merit)
- Presented by: Spain
- Eligibility: Military personnel, Guardia Civil, civilian personnel
- Status: Currently awarded
- Established: 3 August 1866

Precedence
- Next (higher): Medalla Naval
- Equivalent: Cross of Military Merit; Cross of Aeronautical Merit
- Next (lower): Distinguished Service Award (Without Insignia); Mention in Dispatches (Without Insignia); Royal and Military Order of St Hermenegild

The Cross of Naval Merit (Spanish: Cruces del Mérito Naval) is a Spanish military award for gallantry or merit in war or peace. Awarded to members of the Spanish Naval Forces, Guardia Civil or civilians.

== History and Attribution ==
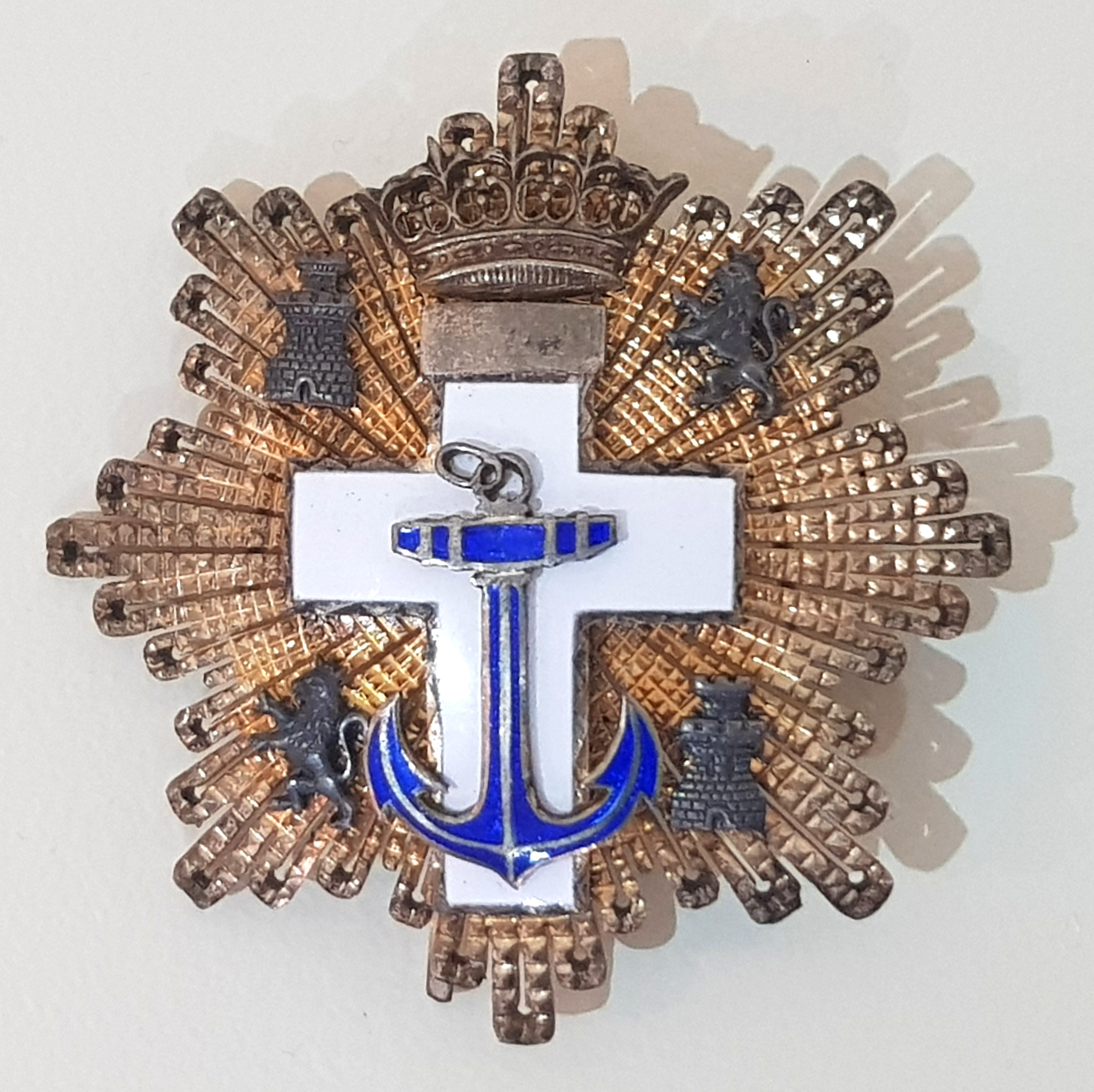
Grand Cross of the Spanish Cruz del Mérito Naval. Type shown, as distintivo blanco, was awarded 1939-75 as lowest class to staff grade officers.

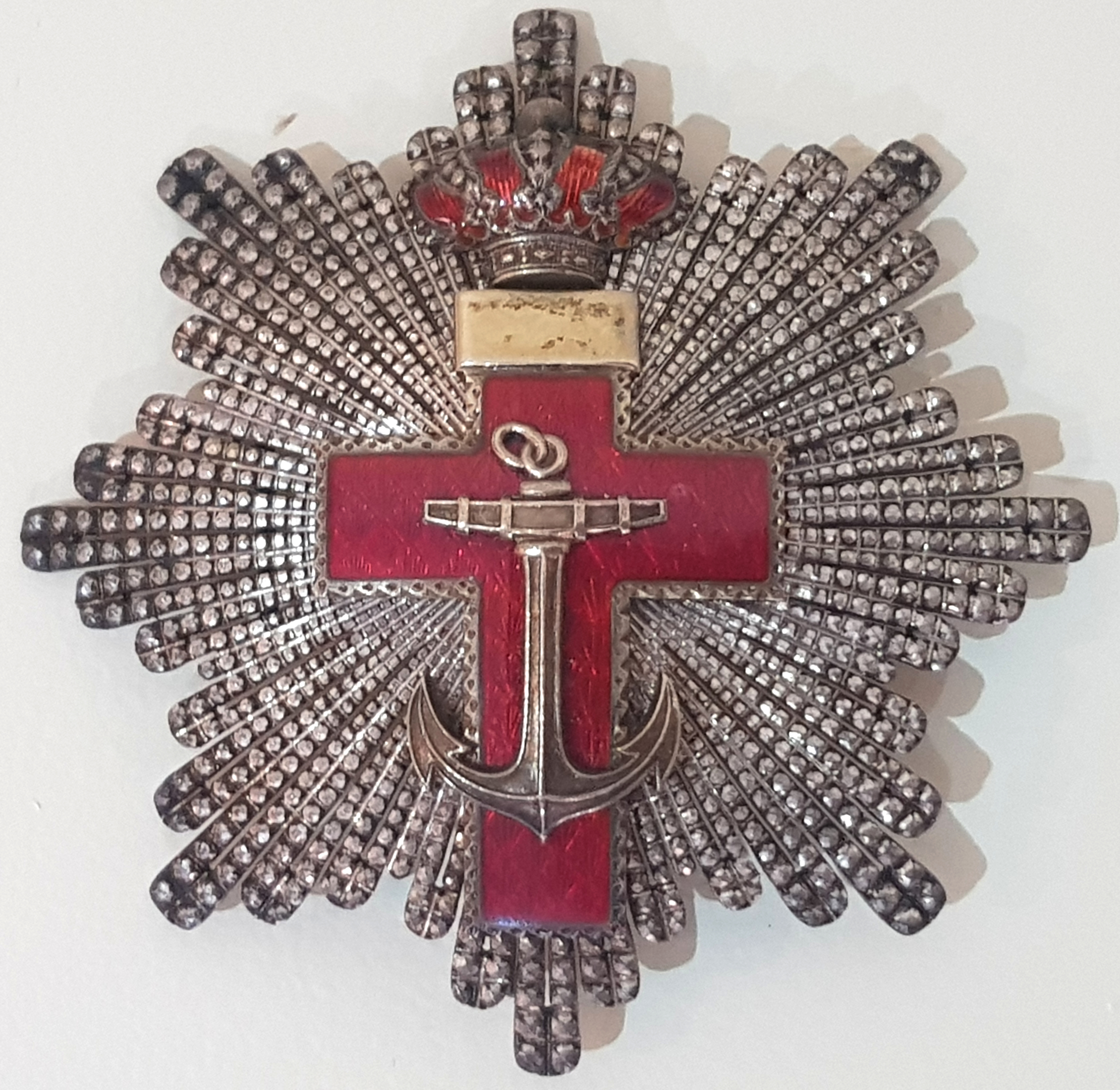
Distintivo rojo, here shown in the type 1922, was the highest class.

Established on 3 August 1866 by Queen Isabella II as the Order of Naval Merit (Spanish: Orden del Mérito Naval) and amended many times (in 1918, 1926, 1931, 1938, 1942, 1976, 1995, 2003 and 2007). During the Spanish Civil War it was recognized by both sides of the conflict. Awarded originally in four classes, it since has lost the rank of an order of merit and the classes were reduced to two and the number of categories extended to four.

According to the current regulations the decoration is conferred in the following classes:

- Grand Cross - to generals, admirals or civilian personnel of equivalent rank;
- Cross - to other officers, non-commissioned ranks or equivalent civilian personnel.

The categories are as follows:

- with Red Decoration (con distintivo rojo) - for courage, actions, deeds or service during an armed conflict or military operations that involve or may involve the use of armed force and may require significant military or command skills; since 2007 it can be awarded for acts of gallantry while on an overseas mission and to soldiers fallen during such a mission;
- with Blue Decoration (con distintivo azul) - for actions, events or extraordinary services including operations resulting from a mandate of the United Nations or of other international organizations;
- with Yellow Decoration (con distintivo amarillo) - for actions, deeds or service that involve high personal risk and in cases of serious injury or death resulting from such actions or service;
- with White Decoration (con distintivo blanco) - for actions, deeds or distinguished service during missions or ordinary or extraordinary service in the armed forces or in connection with defense of the country.

Multiple awards of each class and each category to the same individual are possible.

== Insignia and Ribbons ==
The decoration has the form of a Greek cross with the arms enameled red in the Red Decoration category and white in the remaining categories. The Blue Decoration and Yellow Decoration badges have additional narrow bars in blue or yellow across the lower and lateral arms. The upper arm is surmounted by a Spanish royal crown and has a tablet to engrave the date of bestowal. The round central shield of the obverse bears the coat of arms of Castile, León, Aragon, Navarre and Granada (until 2003 only alternate coats of arms of Castile and León); in the middle there is a blue oval shield (escutcheon) of the House of Bourbon-Anjou. On the reverse there are letters "MM" (Mérito Militar) on red background. The cross is worn on a ribbon on the left side of chest. Each subsequent award is denoted by a bar with the date of bestowal on the ribbon.

The Grand Cross has the same form as the cross described above but is worn on a sash over the right shoulder.

The star added to the class of Grand Cross is gilt, eight-pointed, with the cross superimposed on it; currently between the arms of the cross there are alternate towers (Castile) and lions (León).

Grand Cross - Red Decoration	Grand Cross - Blue Decoration	Grand Cross - Yellow Decoration	Grand Cross - White Decoration
Cross - Red Decoration	Cross - Blue Decoration	Cross - Yellow Decoration	Cross- White Decoration

== See also ==
- Cross of Military Merit (Spain)
- Cross of Aeronautical Merit (Spain)
