= Cross of Military Merit =

- Template of the Cross Military Merit Decorations
- Type: Decoration of merit (formerly order of merit)
- Presented by: Spain
- Eligibility: Military personnel, Guardia Civil, civilian personnel
- Status: Currently awarded
- Established: 3 August 1864

Precedence
- Next (higher): Medalla del Ejército
- Equivalent: Cross of Naval Merit; Cross of Aeronautical Merit
- Next (lower): Distinguished Service Award (Without Insignia); Mention in Dispatches (Without Insignia); Royal and Military Order of St Hermenegild

The Cross of Military Merit (Spanish: Cruces del Mérito Militar) is Spain's military awards for gallantry or merit in war or peace and is awarded to members of the Spanish Armed Forces, Guardia Civil or civilians.

== History and attribution ==
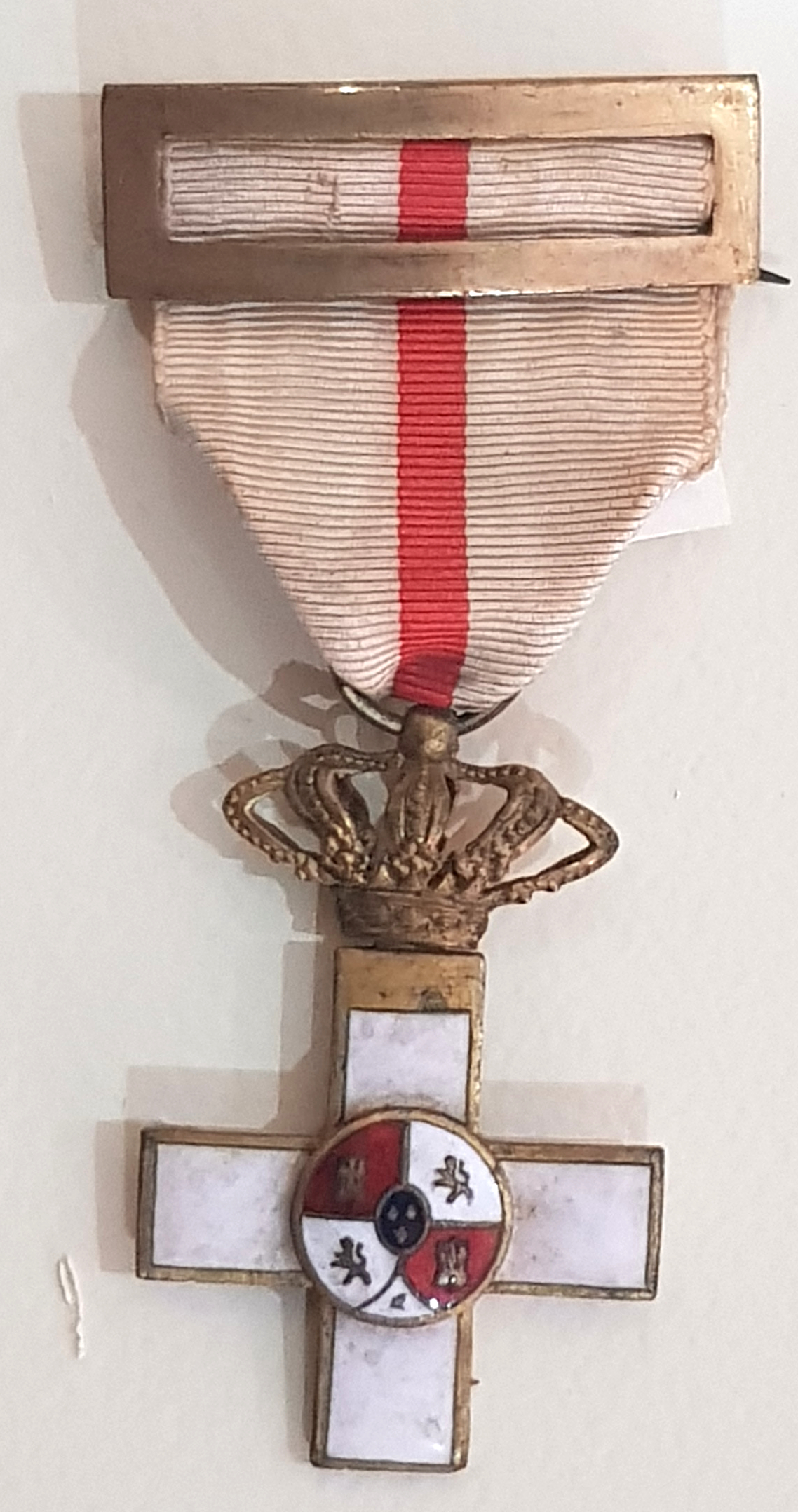
First class, distintivo blanco the lowest, type 1868.

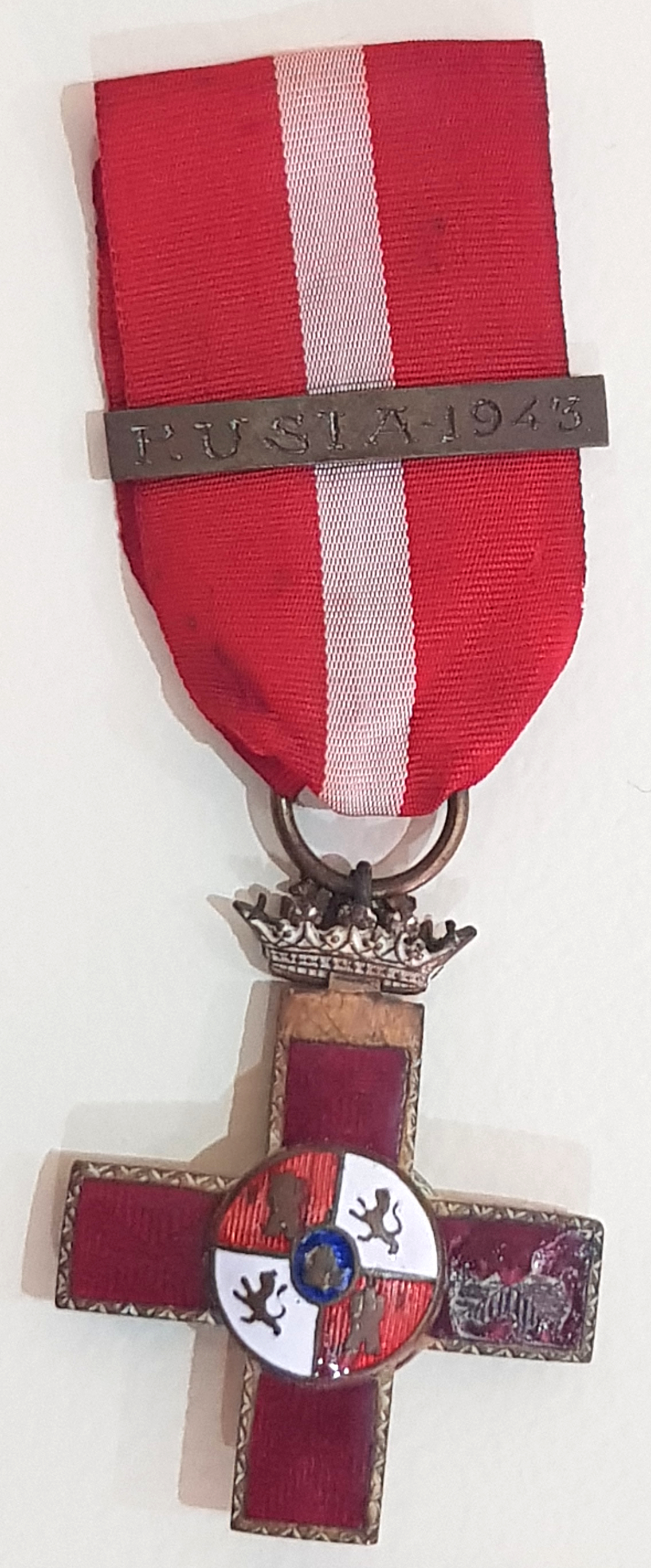
Cruz type 1941 withdistintivo rojo, the highest. Russia clamp 1943.

Established on 3 August 1864 by Queen Isabella II as the Order of Military Merit (Spanish: Orden del Mérito Militar), it has been amended many times (in 1918, 1926, 1931, 1938, 1942, 1976, 1995, 2003 and 2007).

During the Spanish Civil War it was recognized by both sides of the conflict. Awarded originally in four classes, in 1995 it lost the rank of an order of merit, and the classes were reduced to two and the number of categories extended to four.

According to the current regulations the decoration is conferred in the following classes:

- Grand Cross – to generals, admirals or civilian personnel of equivalent rank;
- Cross – to other officers, warrant officers, enlisted ranks or equivalent civilian personnel.

The categories are as follows:

- with Red Decoration (con distintivo rojo) – for courage, actions, deeds or service during an armed conflict or military operations that involve or may involve the use of armed force and may require significant military or command skills; since 2007 it can be awarded to for acts of gallantry while on an overseas mission and to soldiers fallen during such a mission;
- with Blue Decoration (con distintivo azul) – for actions, events or extraordinary services including operations resulting from a mandate of the United Nations or of other international organizations;
- with Yellow Decoration (con distintivo amarillo) – for actions, deeds or service that involve high personal risk and in cases of serious injury or death resulting from such actions or service;
- with White Decoration (con distintivo blanco) – for actions, deeds or distinguished service during missions or ordinary or extraordinary service in the armed forces or in connection with defense of the country.

Multiple awards of each class and each category to the same individual are possible.

=== Original four classes ===
- 4th Class (Grand Cross) for officers who already hold the 3rd Class
- 3rd Class (Grand Officer) for brigade commanders, lieutenant generals, and captain generals
- 2nd Class (Commander) for staff officers (majors, lieutenant colonels and colonels)
- 1st Class (Knight) for cadets, lieutenants, and captains

== Insignia and ribbons ==
The decoration has the form of a Greek cross with the arms enameled red in the Red Decoration category and white in the remaining categories. The Blue Decoration and Yellow Decoration badges have additional narrow bars in blue or yellow across the lower and lateral arms. The upper arm is surmounted by a Spanish royal crown and has a tablet to engrave the date of bestowal.

The round central shield of the obverse bears the coat of arms of

- Castile,
- León,
- Aragon, Navarre and
- Granada (until 2003 only alternate coats of arms of Castile and León).

In the middle there is a blue oval shield (escutcheon) of the House of Bourbon-Anjou. On the reverse there are letters "MM" (Mérito Militar) on red background. The cross is worn on a ribbon on the left side of chest. Each subsequent award is denoted by a bar with the date of bestowal on the ribbon.

The Grand Cross has the same form as the cross described above but is worn on a sash over the right shoulder.

The star added to the class of Grand Cross is gilt, eight-pointed, with the cross superimposed on it; currently between the arms of the cross there are alternate towers (Castile) and lions (León).

| Grand Cross – Red Decoration | Grand Cross – Blue Decoration | Grand Cross – Yellow Decoration | Grand Cross – White Decoration |
| Cross – Red Decoration | Cross – Blue Decoration | Cross – Yellow Decoration | Cross- White Decoration |

== See also ==
- Cross of Naval Merit (Spain)
- Cross of Aeronautical Merit (Spain)
