= Equipment of the Spanish Army =

Modern equipment of the Spanish Army is a list of equipment currently in service with the Spanish Army.

== Small Arms ==
=== Firearms ===
List of all the firearms being in use in the Spanish Army.

Model	Origin	Image	Type	Calibre	Notes
Pistols
Heckler & Koch USP	Germany		Semi-automatic pistol	9×19 mm NATO	Standard issue side arm since 2013, 9,500 pistols ordered in 2011 (€ 4.1 million), replacing the Llama M-82. In January 2024, 5,900 additional pistols ordered (€2.47 million).
Glock 43	Austria		Ultra compact semi-automatic	9×19 mm NATO	Purchased in 2020 for the MOE for scenarios where maximum discretion is required.
Heckler & Koch USP9SD	Germany		Semi-automatic pistol	9×19 mm NATO	The SD variant was already in use by the MOE (Special Operations Command).
Submachine guns
Heckler & Koch MP5	Germany		Submachine gun	9×19 mm NATO	In use with the MOE and will be replaced by the MP7.
Heckler & Koch MP7	Germany		Submachine gun	4.6×30 mm HK	Latest sub-machine gun in the MOE, ordered and delivered in 2019 to replace the MP5. Accessories: Red dot sight; B&T Rotex-II SGM/PDW suppressor
Heckler & Koch UMP	Germany		Submachine gun	9×19 mm NATO	In use with the MOE, purchased in 2009.
FN P90	Belgium		Submachine gun	FN 5.7×28mm NATO	In use with the MOE.
Assault rifles
Heckler & Koch G36E	Germany Spain		Standard-issue assault rifle	5.56×45mm NATO	Standard-issue assault rifle of the Spanish Army. Selected in July 1998 to replace the CETME Model L. Among the 75,219 rifles manufactured for the Spanish Arrmed Forces, 60,000 were manufactured for the Spanish Army. It was manufactured under license in Spain by General Dynamics Santa Bárbara Sistemas Fábrica de Armas de la Coruña (FACOR). Note: the bayonet used with this assault rifle is the Eickhorn KCB–77 M1.
Heckler & Koch G36K	Germany Spain		Carabine	5.56×45mm NATO	In use with the MOE.
Heckler & Koch HK416	Germany		Assault rifle	5.56×45mm NATO	Order of 5,800 rifles in January 2024 (€11.6 million).
Precision rifles
Heckler & Koch G28	Germany		Semi-automatic DMR "Designated Marksman Rifle"	7.62×51mm NATO	27 rifles in use with the MOE. SRM6 suppressor and Schmidt & Bender 3-20X50 mm scope.
Accuracy International AW 308	United Kingdom		Bolt-action sniper rifle	7.62×51mm NATO	Purchased in 2009, in order to increase the number of elite marksmen in the army.
Accuracy International AXMC 338	United Kingdom		Bolt-action sniper rifle	8.6×70mm (.338 Lapua Magnum)	Purchased for the MOE in 2015. Additional weapons have been ordered in 2020.
Barrett M95SP	United States		Anti-materiel precision rifle	12.7×99mm NATO (.50 BMG)	Selected in the mid-1990s as a new long range precision rifle. Additional purchases have been made, such as one in 2022.
Dismounted troops machine guns
Heckler & Koch MG4E	Germany		Light machine gun	5.56×45mm NATO	Standard issued machine gun Selected in 2006 to replace the former standard issued machine gun, the Cetme AMELI. Around 1,800 to 2,000 are in service. Sight: ACOG with a 4 times magnification sight from Trijicon.
Heckler & Koch MG5	Germany		General-purpose machine gun	7.62×51mm NATO	Selected in 2020 to become the new machine gun of the MOE
FN M2HB	Belgium		Heavy machine gun	12.7×99mm NATO	Used among others by dismounted troops on a tripod. Some are equipped with a holographic scope MGS+/3x/120 by IntelliOptix.
Vehicle mounted machine guns
Rheinmetall MG3	Germany Spain		General-purpose machine gun	7.62×51mm NATO	Coaxial and weapon stations machine gun. Used on the Pizarro, Leopard 2E, Centauro B1, VEC-M1, Dragon VCR. License made in Spain by GDELS - SBS.
FN M2HB	Belgium		Heavy machine gun	12.7×99mm NATO	Used among others with several vehicles of the Army (RCWS and turret for gunners). Some are equipped with a holographic scope MGS+/3x/120 by IntelliOptix.
Helicopter (FAMET) mounted machine guns
FN MAG	Belgium		General-purpose machine gun	7.62×51mm NATO	Used on helicopters of the FAMET. It is one of the successor of the MG 42. Orders: 2016, purchased to equip the Cougar; November 2022, 20 purchased to equip the Cougar, Super Puma and NH90
FN Minimi MK3	Belgium		General-purpose machine gun	7.62×51mm NATO	Used on helicopters of the FAMET. 20 purchased in November 2022 to equip Cougar, Super Puma and NH90.
M240	United States		General-purpose machine gun	7.62×51mm NATO	Used on helicopters of the FAMET: It is one of the successor of the MG 42. Purchased in 2016 to equip the CH-47D Chinook.
FN M3M	Belgium		Heavy machine gun	12.7×99mm NATO	Used on helicopters of the FAMET: It is one of the successor of the MG 42. Purchased in 2016 to equip the Cougar, Super Puma, CH-47D Chinook and NH90.

=== Explosive weapons ===
Model	Origin	Image	Type	Calibre	Notes
Hand grenades
Instalaza ALHAMBRA	Spain	—	Hand grenades (with electronic fuse)	—	Standard grenades in use with the Spanish Army. 230,000 grenades ordered in November 2024. Variants in use: M2, fragmentation; EJ, exercise; IN (M2), inert
Grenade launchers
Heckler & Koch AG36	Germany		Under-barrel grenade launcher	40×46 mm LV	Grenade launcher used with the standard-issue assault rifle Heckler & Koch G36E.
SB LAG 40	Spain		Automatic grenade launcher	40×53 mm HV	Used on vehicles such as the VAMTAC, the Iveco LMV, the BMR and the M113. Accessories: Holographic visors from Våpensmia ordered in 2023.
MK19 Mod. 3	United States		Automatic grenade launcher	40×53 mm HV	Selected in 2017 to replace the SB LAG 40. This grenade launcher was already in use with the Spanish Marine Infantry.
MANPATS (Man Portable Antis Tank Systems)
Instalaza CS-70	Spain	—	Rocket launcher	72 mm	aaa
Instalaza C90	Spain		Rocket launcher	90 mm	Six rocket categories / warheads combinations in use in the Spanish Army. 2 rocket launcher categories: "CR" also known as the "M3.5", the standard rocket launcher; "CS" for Confined Space use; 3 warhead available (same for "CR" and "CS"): AT: Anti-Tank, 5.3 kg (CS variant, 6.7 kg), 350 m range, shaped charge warhead with a penetration of 500 mm armored steel and 1,000 mm of concrete; DP: Dual Purpose, 5.2 kg (CS, 6.8 kg), 350 m range for point target, 700 m for area, penetration of 220 mm armored steel and 500 mm of concrete; BK: Anti bunker, 5.4 kg (CS, 7.2 kg), 350 m range (300 m, CS) Tandem precursor warhead; 13,000 additional ordered in June 2024.
Instalaza Alcotán-100 (M2)	Spain		Rocket launcher	100 mm	Shoulder-fired weapon with a 600 m range (1,000 m with air-burst variant), used as anti-tank and anti-structure weapon. It can penetrate 700 mm of steel armor + ERA.
Anti-tank missiles (dismounted troops)
Rafael Spike LR	Israel		ATGM Anti-tank guided missile	130 mm	260 launchers and 2,600 Spike LR were ordered in 2006 to replace: M47 Dragon initially; MILAN progressively
Anti-tank missiles (vehicles)
BGM-71E TOW	United States		ATGM Anti-tank guided missile	152 mm	Purchased to equip vehicles and dismounted troops. As of 2022, it was only used on vehicles. It was decided to replace it with the Rafael Spike LR II ATGM. Orders: 2000 missiles and 200 launchers in 1993 (with second generation thermal cameras), 68 of which installed on vehicles.; 1,000 missiles were ordered in 2009.
MDBA MILAN 2T	Germany France		ATGM Anti-tank guided missile	115 mm	Being phased-out and replaced by the Rafael Spike. 106 launchers were used by the infantry (404 in total). As of 2025, the number in service is unknown. Variant in use: MILAN 2T ((tandem shaped charge warhead).
Rafael Spike LR II	Israel Spain		ATGM Anti-tank guided missile	130 mm	168 launchers and 1,680 Spike LR2 missiles replacing the BGM-71 TOW were ordered in 2022 to equip vehicles. The production was made under licence in Spain. As of 2025, Spain is planning to cancel the purchase of this missile, and to replace it with a locally designed missile.
Anti-tank missiles (FAMET helicopters)
Rafael Spike ER	Israel		ATGM Anti-tank guided missile	170 mm	Selected in 2007 to become the air-to-surface missile of the Eurocopter Tiger in the FAMET 44 launchers and 200 missiles were ordered in 2007, 400 additional missiles were ordered in 2022
Fire control
VOSEL	Spain		Fire control unit	—	Fire control unit in two variants for the Instalaza Alcotán-100: VOSEL (M2); VOSEL (M2)-IR

== Indirect fire ==
The list of equipment by the artillery forces of the Spanish Army.

=== Artillery ===
Model	Origin	Image	Type	Calibre	Quantity	Notes
Self-propelled howitzers
M109A5E	United States		SPH Self-propelled Howitzer	155 mm (NATO) L/39	96	Purchased as a M109A1 and entered service in 1978. It was modernised to the M109A5E standard, and equipped with a L/39 gun. In 2020, the barrel was modernised from the M284 to the M284 A2 standard. It is different in its chrome plating and a bushing solution preventing erosion in evacuator holes. Note: The Spanish Marines operated 6 M109A5E and 6 M992 FAASV. System to be replaced.
Towed howitzers
SIAC 155/52 (APU)	Spain		Towed howitzer	155 mm (NATO) L/52	66	Artillery system from GDELS SBS.
SIAC 155/52 (V07)	Spain	—	Coastal towed howitzer	155 mm (NATO) L/52	16	Artillery system from GDELS SBS, used for coastal artillery.
L118 Light Gun	United Kingdom		Field gun	105 mm L/37	18	Purchase of 56 guns approved in 1995, received in 1996, as a partial replacement of the OTO Melara Mod 56. 38 conversion kits to the L119 variant were part of the contract.
L119 Light Gun	United Kingdom		Field gun	105 mm L/30	38	38 conversion kits from the L118 to the L119 variant were part of the purchase of 56 L118 light guns.
OTO Melara Mod 56	Italy		Mountain Gun	105 mm L/14	—	Partially replaced by the L118 / L119 Light Gun in 1996, and some other systems were supplied to Ukraine..
Ammunition supply vehicles
M548 TOA M-548	United States		Ammunition supply vehicle	—	158	Operated by Field Artillery Groups (GACA).
M-548/6 SEM-1I TOA M-548	United States		Ammunition supply vehicle	—	18	Operated by Field Artillery Groups (GACA).
Tow trucks
Iveco Pegaso M250.37WM	Italy Spain		Towed howitzer tractor	—	—	Artillery tractor and crew transport for the SIAC 155/52.
VAMTAC SK-95	Spain		Field gun tractor	—	—	Artillery tractor and crew transport for the L118/L119.
Special ammunitions
M982 Excalibur	Sweden United States	—	Extended-range guided shell	155 mm (NATO)	—	100 Excalibur ordered in 2019; 153 Excalibur-S ordered in 2023

=== Mortars ===
Model	Origin	Image	Type	Calibre	Quantity	Notes
Self-propelled mortars
Cardom 81 - EIMOS	Spain Israel		Mortar carrier	81 mm	6	6 ordered in October 2011, and entered service in 2012. The system is installed on the URO Vamtac S3 BN-2 (MRAP variant).
Dual EIMOS	Spain	—	Mortar carrier	81 mm	89 (for the Army) (116 in the Armed Forces)	In may 2023, the Fuerza 35 concept planned for 258 Dual EIMOS eventually, and in a first phase, 104 systems in the armed forces (80 for the army, 18 for the marine infantry and 6 for the air force). Firm orders: 2 in November 2021 for the marine infantry; 4 in December 2022 for the marine infantry; 6 in July 2023 for the marine infantry; 8 at the end of 2023 for the army.; 84 in a framework agreement signed in October 2024 (72 for the army, 6 for the marines, 6 for the air force, all delivered by 2027).; Additional orders in a second phase: 12 ordered in June 2025 (9 for the Army, 3 for the Marine Corps).; Expal mortar system installed on the armoured URO Vamtac ST5.

=== Artillery reconnaissance and surveillance ===
Model	Origin	Image	Type	Quantity	Notes
Radars
AN/TPQ-36 Firefinder	United States		Counter-battery radar	Unknown	Operated by the MACA (Campaign Artillery Command). System to be replaced likely by the Indra MTR-5 radar.
Saab ARTHUR B	Sweden		Counter-battery radar	4	Radar acquired in 2006 and delivered by 2012. Radar being upgraded ARTHUR D1 standard, and the Iveco 7226 4×4 truck replaced by a Iveco Pegaso M250 40W 6×6. Modernisation contract signed in October 2025.
9KA-410	—	—	Land target acquisition radar (RAS)	—	
Observation
POMO Puesto de observación móvil	Spain	—	Mobile observation post	—	Iveco Pegaso M250 6×6 tactical truck transporting an observation post in a container which is equipped with: 9KA-410 land target acquisition radar; Talos GMV (two-tier command and control system, fire support coordination and execution integrated into the ground manœuvres); Sensor pedestal with daytime camera, thermal camera, and laser transmitter
URO Vamtac VERT Vehículo de Reconocimiento Terrestre	Spain	—	Reconnaissance and surveillance	17 (Additional ordered)	URO Vamtac ST5 equipped with a SERT sensor suite on a mast and a communication system, and a RCWS (remote controlled weapon station).: Phase 1: 17 vehicles; Phase 2: VERT 2.0 model ordered in October 2025 (€266 million)
VCR Dragon VCOAV Vehículos de Combate de Observador Avanzado	Spain Switzerland	—	Advanced combat observation vehicle	0 (8 ordered)	8 vehicles of this type ordered in the first phase of the Dragon VCR programme. Equipment: SERT sights, sensors on mast; Talos GMV (two-tier command and control system, fire support coordination and execution integrated into the ground manœuvres); RCWS EM&E Guardian 2.0 with a M2 Browning machine gun
Other sensors
MSRA Mobile Sound Ranging Array	Netherlands	—	Sound sensor	—	System supplied by Microflown AVISA, combining Acoustic Multi-Mission Sensors to evaluate the trajectory of artillery shells. It is also known as the HALO.
TARSIS 25 or TARSIS 75	Spain	—	Airborne sensors	—	Airborne sensors on RPAS Tucan and Atlantic (Remotely Piloted Aircraft System) to be supplied by AERTEC.
UAV
RPAS Tucan	Spain	—	Fixed-wing UAV / ISTAR Unmanned aerial vehicle / Intelligence, surveillance, target acquisition and reconnaissance	6	Purchased in 2017
RPAS Atlantic	Spain	—	ISTAR Intelligence, surveillance, target acquisition and reconnaissance	—	Purchased in 2017

== Armoured vehicles ==
=== Tanks and fire support vehicles ===
Model	Origin	Image	Type	Calibre	Quantity	Notes
Main battle tanks
Leopard 2E (CC) Variant of the Leopard 2A6	Germany Spain		MBT Main battle tank	120 mm L/55	219	Purchase decided in 1995 as part of the "Programa Coraza", produced in Spain under licence between 1998 and 2008. 219 MBT in service (197 made in Spain, 22 made in Germany by KMW). Planned to be modernised to the standard in three phases to the standard Leopardo 2E M2+ by 2032. The modernisation includes new tracks, the new tank gun Rh120 L/55A1, a RCWS added, an APS added, IED protection, optimised transmission.
Leopard 2A4	Germany		MBT Main battle tank	120 mm L/44	79	108 purchased second hand to the German Army as part of the "Programa Coraza" (initially leased). 29 were refurbished and supplied to Ukraine, while the rest is in service with the Spanish Army.
Light tank
Centauro B1 (VRCC-105)	Italy Spain		Tank Destroyer / Cavalry reconnaissance vehicle	105 mm L/52	84	Orders and deliveries: 22 ordered in 1999, delivered in 2000-01 (made in Italy); 62 ordered in 2002, delivered in 2004-06 (made in Spain)
Training tanks
Leopard 2E (CESC)	Germany Spain	—	MBT training Main battle tank	—	4	These 4 were produced in Germany.
Recovery vehicles
Büffel ARV Leopard 2E CREC	Germany Spain	—	ARV Aarmoured recovery vehicle	—	16	12 made in Spain, 4 in Germany.
Freccia (VCREC)	Italy Spain	—	ARV Aarmoured recovery vehicle	—	4	Ordered in 2010, in the third phase of the Centaura acquisition programme.

== Aircraft ==
This is the list of aircraft of the FAMET (Fuerzas Aeromóviles del Ejército de Tierra), which is the Army Airmobile Force.

Model	Spanish designation	Origin	Image	Type	Quantity	Notes
Combat helicopter
EC665 Tiger HAD-E Mk II	HA-28	France Germany Spain		Attack helicopter	18	6 HAP-E and 18 HAD-E received. The HAP-E variant was planned to be upgraded to the HAD-E standard, but ended up being retired.
Transport and utility helicopters
Airbus H145M	—	Germany		Utility helicopter	0 (+50 on order)	
Agusta-Bell AB212	HU-18	Italy United States		Utility helicopter	6	6 in service in 2025, planned to be retired.
Boeing Chinook CH-47F Block I	HT-17	Germany USA Spain		Heavy transport helicopter	17 (+1 on order)	Spain purchased initially 10 CH-47C in the 1970s, and 9 CH-47D in 1982. The CH-47C were modernised to the CH-47D standard. Two helicopters crashed. The modernisation of 17 CH-47D into CH-47F Block I was ordered in 2018, and completed in 2025. The FAMET ordered a newly built CH-47F Block I to be delivered in 2026.
Eurocopter / CASA AS332B1 Super Puma	HU-21	France Spain		Transport helicopter	15	18 received by 1986, 16 remain in service. 1 lost in 1999, and 1 lost in 2000.
Eurocopter AS532UL Cougar	HT-27	France		Transport helicopter	14	15 ordered in February 1996, entered service in 1998, and one was lost. 1 lost in 2007.
NHI NH90 TTH	HT-29	France Germany Italy Netherlands Spain		Transport helicopter	15 (+23 on order)	Orders: Batch 1: Army - 16; Air Force - 6; Batch 2 (standard 3, delivery 2024-28): Army - 10; Air Force - 6; Navy - 7; Batch 3; Army - 13; Air Force - 12; Navy - 6; 1 NH90 of the FAMET lost in February 2025.
Training helicopter
Airbus H135 (T2+ variant)	HE-26	Germany		Training helicopter	12	Helicopters used for the training of pilots in the ACAVIET.
Medical
Eurocopter AS532AL Cougar	HT-27	France		SAR, MEDEVAC and firefighting helicopter	3	3 purchased in 2007, although 15 of this type were initially planned, entered service in 2008. Helicopter operated by the BHELEME II, which is a part of the Spanish Army. 1 lost in 2015.
Airbus H135 (T2+ variant)	HE-26	Germany		SAR, MEDEVAC and firefighting helicopter	4	Ordered in 2007, delivered in 2008. The UME (Military Emergencies Unit) operates 4 H135.

== Planned future equipment ==
=== Indirect fire ===
Model	Image	Origin	Type	Calibre	Quantity expected	Notes
Howitzers
UE ATP Cadenas	—	Spain	Tracked SPH Self-propelled howitzer	NATO 155mm L/52	128	The Spanish Army and the Marine Infantry are looking for a successor to the M109A5. The quantity mentioned here are for both forces. Requirements: highly mobile, automated, low crew size and response time. Systems selected in December 2025, to be developed and made by Indre and EM&E.
UE ATP Ruedas	—	Spain	Wheeled SPH Self-propelled howitzer	NATO 155mm L/52	86	The Spanish Army and the Marine Infantry are looking for a successor to the M109A5. The quantity mentioned here are for both forces. Requirements: highly mobile, automated, low crew size and response time. Systems selected in December 2025, to be developed and made by Indre and EM&E.
Command vehicles
Tracked command vehicles (Likely ASCOD 2)	—	Spain	Artillery command vehicle	—	11	11 for the Marine Infantry in a specific configuration for the Marine. Note: 48 for the Army.
Support vehicles
Tracked ammunition vehicle (Likely ASCOD 2)	—	Spain	Ammunition resupply vehicle	—	128	For both the Army and the Marine Infantry.
Wheeled ammunition vehicle (Likely Piranha IV 8×8 or Piranha IV HMC 10×10)	—	Switzerland	Ammunition resupply vehicle	—	86	For both the Army and the Marine Infantry.
Tracked recovery vehicle (Likely ASCOD 2)	—	Spain	ARV Armoured recovery vehicle	—	21	For both the Army and the Marine Infantry.
Wheeled recovery vehicle (Likely Piranha IV 8×8 or Piranha IV HMC 10×10)	—	Switzerland	ARV Armoured recovery vehicle	—	14	For both the Army and the Marine Infantry.
Tracked maintenance vehicle (Likely ASCOD 2)	—	Spain	Maintenance	—	7 (if needed)	For both the Army and the Marine Infantry.
Wheeled maintenance vehicle (Likely Piranha IV 8×8 or Piranha IV HMC 10×10)	—	Switzerland	Maintenance	—	7 (if needed)	For both the Army and the Marine Infantry.
Additional equipment for the tracked howitzers
Artillery simulators	—	Germany	Simulator	—	16	For both the Army and the Marine Infantry: 8 for the tracked artillery sub-programme; 8 for the wheeled artillery sub-programme
Tube cleaning kit	—	Germany	Tube cleaning	—	43	For both the Army and the Marine Infantry: 25 for the tracked artillery sub-programme; 18 for the wheeled artillery sub-programme
Reduced-fire systems	—	Germany	Reduced-fire	—	214	For both the Army and the Marine Infantry: 128 for the tracked artillery sub-programme; 86 for the wheeled artillery sub-programme; Note: systems / ammunitions that minimise the collateral damage and unintended fires.
Counter-battery equipment
Indra	—	Spain	Counter-battery radars	—	—	Radar planned for land surveillance and coastal defence. It is being purchase under the Ralofi programme for €30 million to replace the AN/TPQ 36 AMR.

=== Armoured vehicles ===
==== Tanks and fire support vehicles ====
Model	Origin	Image	Type	Calibre	Quantity	Notes
Main battle tanks
Leopard 2A8	Germany		MBT Main battle tank	120 mm L/55	Unknown	Replacement of the Leopard 2A4 with the Leopard 2A8 expected.
