= Spanish Armed Forces =

Combined military forces of Spain

- Fuerzas Armadas de España
- Emblem of the Spanish Armed Forces
- Founded: 20 January 1479 (547 years, 220 days)
- Service branches: Army; Spanish Legion; Navy; Marine Infantry; Air and Space Force; Royal Guard; Military Emergencies Unit; Common Corps
- Headquarters: Madrid, Spain

Leadership
- Monarch: Felipe VI
- Prime Minister: Pedro Sánchez
- Minister of Defence: Margarita Robles
- Chief of the Defence Staff: Admiral General; Teodoro Esteban López Calderón

Personnel
- Military age: 18
- Conscription: No
- Active personnel: 122,255 (2025); 84,090 Civil Guards (only in wartime) (2025)
- Reserve personnel: 26,264 (2025); 8,459 Civil Guards (only in wartime) (2025)

Expenditure
- Budget: €33.123 billion (2025)
- Percent of GDP: 2% (2025)

Industry
- Domestic suppliers: Airbus; Santa Bárbara; Navantia; Indra; Gamesa; Abengoa; Instalaza; UROVESA
- Foreign suppliers: Canada; European Union; France; Germany; NATO; Switzerland; United States
- Annual imports: US$112 million (2014–2022)
- Annual exports: US$752 million (2014–2022)

Related articles
- History: Military history of Spain; Warfare directory of Spain; Wars involving Spain; Battles involving Spain
- Ranks: Military ranks of Spain

The Spanish Armed Forces are in charge of guaranteeing the sovereignty and independence of the Kingdom of Spain, defending its territorial integrity and the constitutional order, according to the functions entrusted to them by the Constitution of 1978. They are composed of: the Army, the Air and Space Force, the Navy, the Royal Guard, and the Military Emergencies Unit, as well as the so-called Common Corps.

Spain occupies a prominent position in the structure of NATO, which it joined in 1982. Nevertheless, it spends less than the minimum of 2% of GDP on defence recommended by NATO.

Spain has the oldest Marine Infantry in the world and the oldest permanent military units in the world: the Infantry Regiment "Inmemorial del Rey" No. 1 and the Infantry Regiment "Soria" No. 9.

== History ==
After the long Reconquista ending in 1492, Spain evolved into Europe's foremost power with the voyages of Christopher Columbus the same year, leading to Spain acquiring vast lands in the Americas and conquering a number of overseas civilizations in the decades to come. The period of reconquest of Iberia had ended, and now Spain entered an era of overseas conquest spearheaded by conquistadors. The conquest of the Aztec Empire, the conquest of the Inca Empire and the conquest of the Philippines ensued propelling Spain to the foremost military superpower of the time. Spain was also victorious over the French in the Italian Wars, annexing southern Italy. During the reign of Charles V and Philip II, Spain reached the peak of its power with the Spanish Empire spanning 19.4 million square km of the Earth's surface, a total of 13% being the first empire which the Sun never sets. By the mid 17th century Spain had been militarily weakened by the Thirty Years War, the Eighty Years War along with financial problems, and the lack of reforms, though still holding firm to the bulk of the American Continent.

During the 18th century the new Bourbon dynasty revived Spain's economic and military power through a series of important reforms in the armed forces and the economy, notably those of Charles III of Spain. Thanks to these reforms, Spain performed well during the war of Jenkins' Ear defending overseas territory, won the war of Austrian Succession but had mixed result during the Seven Years' War. Spain had also led successful campaigns in the American Revolutionary War. Spain had recovered considerably by the outbreak of the French Revolution, by 1790, the Spanish Empire was the largest empire in the world. The occupation of a great part of Spain by the French during the Napoleonic Wars resulted in Peninsular War, which was characterized by use on a large scale of guerrilla troops, made necessary by the war's devastating effect on the Spanish economy. Although victorious in the Peninsular War over Napoleonic France, the Spanish military was in poor condition and political instability resulted in the loss of most of Spain's former colonies, who had rebelled against Spanish rule in the Spanish American wars of independence, except Cuba, Puerto Rico, and the Philippines. These too would be lost later in the Spanish–American War.

In the 20th century, the Spanish armed forces did not intervene in the First World War (neutrality) or in the Second World War (non-belligerent), although they did intervene in the Spanish Civil War and in some colonial conflicts. After the arrival of democracy in 1978, they underwent a strong modernization process, becoming modern armed forces. In 1982 Spain entered NATO.

Recently, in the last decades of the 20th century and the first decades of the 21st, Spanish troops have participated together with their Western allies in operations such as Gulf War, NATO bombing of Yugoslavia, KFOR, war on terror, 2011 military intervention in Libya, Combined Task Force 150 and UNIFIL.

=== Today ===
Spain participated along with France, the United Kingdom, Italy, Denmark, the United States and Canada in the 2011 intervention against Muammar Gaddafi in Libya, contributing a tanker, 4 F/A-18 Hornet fighter jets, a frigate, a submarine and a surveillance aircraft, along with logistical support from the Naval Station Rota and the Morón Air Base.

Spain has belonged to NATO since 1982. The decision was ratified in the 1986 referendum by the Spanish people. The conditions were the reduction of American military bases, non-integration of Spain in the military structure of NATO, and the prohibition of introducing nuclear weapons in Spain.

==== Current missions ====
As of June 2017, 3,093 soldiers of the Spanish Armed Forces and the Civil Guard are part of the nineteen operations where Spain has an active role.

According to the National Security Department of Spain (DSN), these are the current missions of the armed forces and civil guard:

- Missions with the European Union
  - EUTM Mali (2013–2024): Advisory mission in the security and training sector of the Malian National Army. 130 deployed military personnel.
  - EUTM CAR (2016–present): Training mission of the Armed Forces of the Government of the Central African Republic. The Eurocorps is in charge of carrying out this mission. 19 military deployed.
  - EUTM SOMALIA (2010–present): Training mission of the Somali Armed Forces, with the cooperation of the UN and the African Union. 16 military deployed.
  - Operation Atalanta (2008–present): Mission to combat piracy in the Indian Ocean as well as protection of the UN food program. 338 deployed military.
  - EUFOR ALTHEA BOSNIA (2004–present): Advisory mission to the Armed Forces of Bosnia and Herzegovina. 3 military deployed.
  - EUNAVFOR MED-SOPHIA (2015–present): Mission to combat trafficking in human beings and prevention of loss of life in the Mediterranean. 261 deployed military personnel.
- Missions with NATO
  - Operation Sea Guardian (2016–present): Mission to fight against terrorism in the Mediterranean. 119 military deployed.
  - SNMG1 / SNMG2 / SNMCMG2: NATO first-responder permanent naval units. 251 deployed military personnel.
  - Baltic Air Policing (2004–present): Mission to protect the airspace of Estonia, Latvia and Lithuania. 128 deployed military personnel.
  - Enhanced Forward Presence (2017–present): Mission of presence of NATO in the Baltic Sea region following the annexation of Crimea by Russia. 310 military deployed.
  - Operation Active Fence (2015–present): Mission to reinforce Turkey's air defense against the threat of ballistic missiles from Syria. 149 deployed military personnel.
- Missions with UN
  - UNIFIL (2006–present): Peacekeeping Monitoring Mission between Lebanon and Israel. 620 soldiers and civil guards deployed.
  - UN COLOMBIA (2016–present): Mission of observers of the peace process in Colombia. 14 deployed military personnel.
- Coalition against Daesh
  - INHERENT RESOLVE (2015–present): Training mission of Iraqi forces to fight the Daesh. 463 soldiers and civil guards deployed.
- Security cooperation with France
  - Support for Mali-Senegal (2013–2022): Military support to France to facilitate air transport of French and EU operations in Mali and Sahel. 61 military deployed.
  - Support for the Central African Republic (2013–present): Military support for France and the EU to facilitate air transport in its operations. 45 military deployed.
- National missions of cooperation with Senegal and Cape Verde
  - Support for Senegal (2016–present): Cooperative security activities with other countries. 34 deployed military personnel.
  - Support for Cape Verde (2016–present): Cooperative security activities with other countries. 59 deployed military personnel.

The Spanish Armed Forces also participated in the last few years in other missions, above all humanitarian and observation: in Albania in 1999, Mozambique in 2000, Republic of Macedonia in 2001, Haiti in 2004 and Indonesia in 2005. In 2006, Spain participated in Darfur, Sudan by sending observers, and in the Democratic Republic of the Congo. Spain also participated in the Iraq War between 2003 and 2004, in Gabon and in Senegal to safeguard maritime traffic in the Horn of Africa (with 33 Civil Guards and national police officers, two patrol vessels and a helicopter). In 2015, 46 UME soldiers and 12 Civil Guards of the High Mountain Group went to help and rescue in the Nepal earthquake, along with six dogs, three scientific police and a Boeing 707 of supplies transport of the Air and Space Force.

The cost of these missions abroad amounts to approximately 800 million euros per year.

== Command structure ==
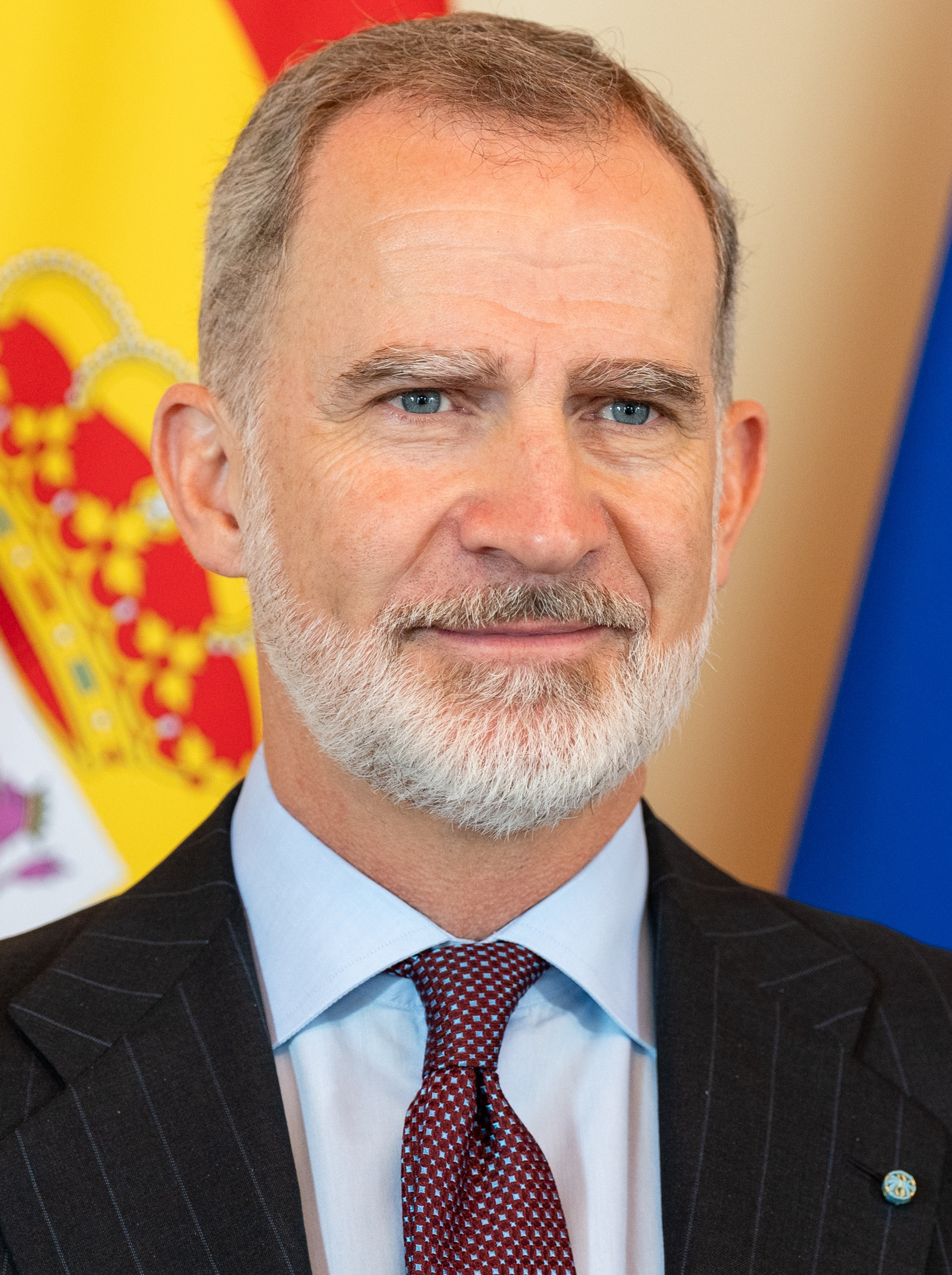
King Felipe VI

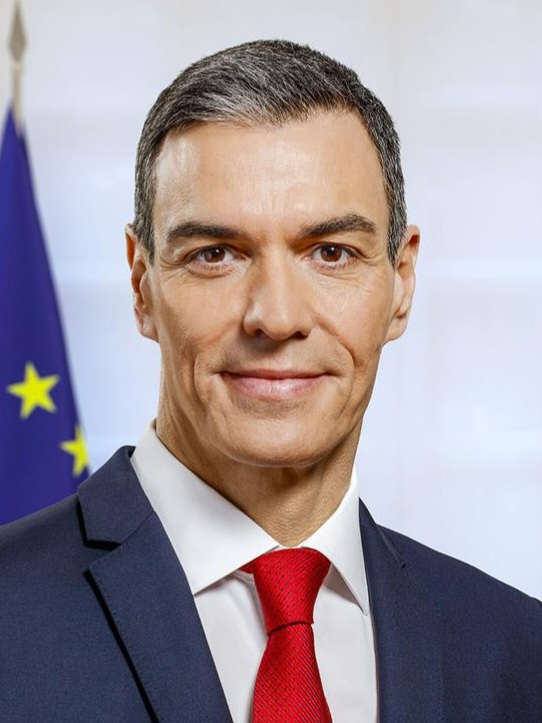
PM Pedro Sánchez

The commander-in-chief of the Armed Forces is the Monarch; with the ex officio rank of Captain General in the Army, Navy and Air and Space Force. The Spanish Constitution of 1978 states in article 62(h) that the King of Spain shall have "supreme command of the Armed Forces"; however under article 64, all official acts of the Monarch must be countersigned by the President of the Government (or other competent minister) to become valid.

The President of the Government (also known as Prime Minister in English translations), as the head of government, is responsible under article 97 for "domestic and foreign policy, civil and military administration and the defense of the State", and thus bears the ultimate responsibility before the Cortes Generales, and the Spanish electorate.

The Minister of Defense is in charge of running the Ministry of Defense, which carries out the day-to-day administration of the forces. The President of the Government and the Minister of Defense are civilians. No provision in the Constitution requires the Government to seek approval from the Cortes Generales before sending the armed forces abroad.

The Chief of the Defense Staff directs the Defense Staff and is the senior military advisor to the Minister and the Government. The military leadership of the three military services are: the Chief of Staff of the Army, the Chief of Staff of the Air and Space Force and the Chief of Staff of the Navy.

The structure, and incumbents as of 2025, are:

1. Commander in Chief: King Felipe VI, Captain General of the Armed Forces
2. President of the Government: Pedro Sánchez.
3. Minister of Defence: Margarita Robles.
4. Chief of the Defense Staff: Admiral General Teodoro E. López Calderón.
5. The Chiefs of Staff of the branches:
  Chief of Staff of the Army: Army General Amador Fernando Enseñat y Berea.
  Chief of Staff of the Navy: Admiral General Antonio Piñeiro Sánchez.
  Chief of Staff of the Air and Space Force: Air General Francisco Braco Carbó.

== Branches ==
The Spanish armed forces are a professional force with a strength in 2017 of 121,900 active personnel and 4,770 reserve personnel. The country also has the 77,000 strong Civil Guard which comes under the control of the Ministry of defense in times of a national emergency.

=== Army ===
The Spanish Army consists of 15 active brigades and 6 military regions. Modern infantry have diverse capabilities and this is reflected in the varied roles assigned to them. There are four operational roles that infantry battalions can fulfil: air assault, armoured infantry, mechanised infantry, and light role infantry.

Ejército de Tierra de España (Spanish Army)

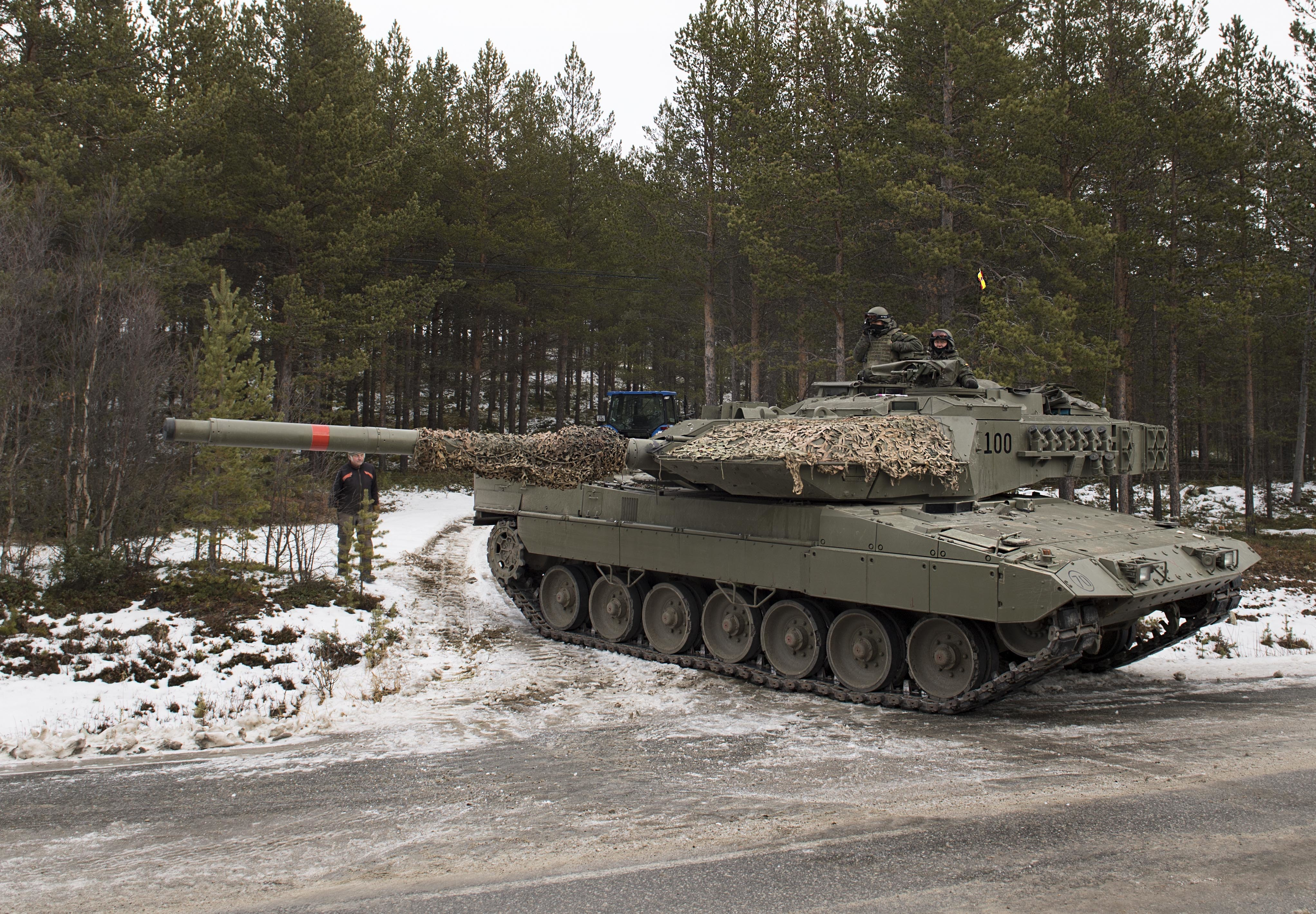
Leopard 2E (MBT)

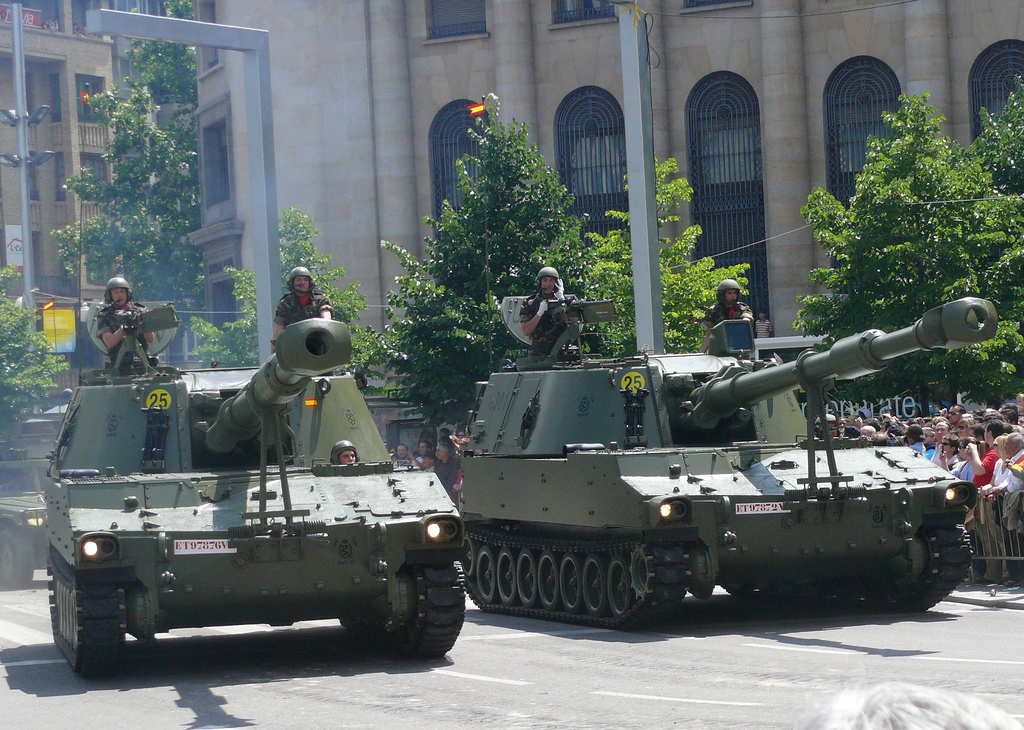
M-109A5E

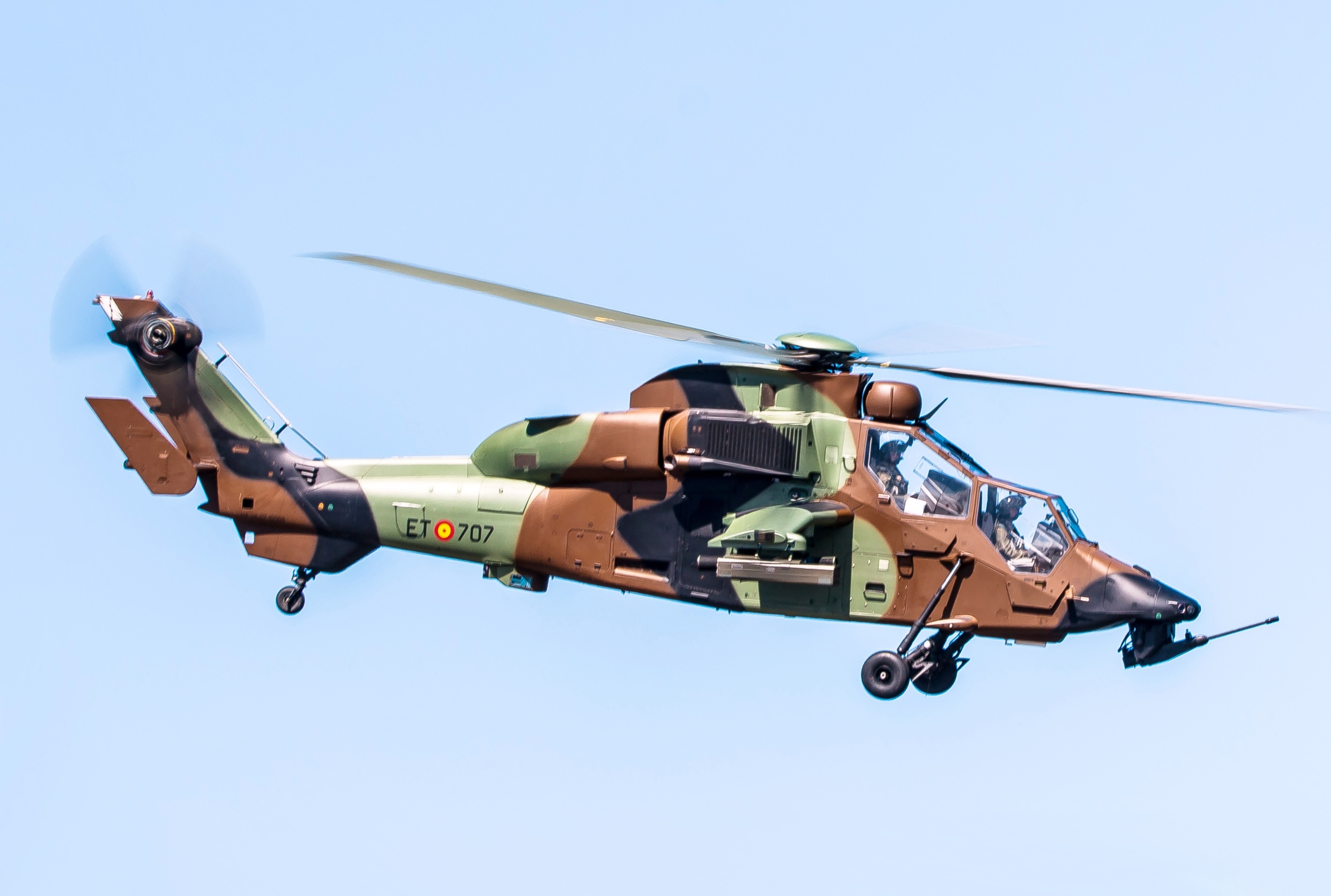
Eurocopter Tiger

=== Navy ===
Under the command of the Spanish Admiral Chief of Naval Staff, stationed in Madrid, the Spanish Navy has four area commands:

- Cantabrian Maritime Zone with its headquarters at Ferrol on the Atlantic coast
- Straits Maritime Zone with its headquarters at San Fernando near Cadiz
- Mediterranean Maritime Zone with its headquarters at Cartagena
- Canary Islands Maritime Zone with its headquarters at Las Palmas de Gran Canaria.

The current flagship of the Spanish Navy is the amphibious assault ship/aircraft carrier Juan Carlos I. In addition, the fleet consists of: 2 amphibious transport docks, 11 frigates, 3 submarines, 6 mine countermeasure vessels, 23 patrol vessels and a number of auxiliary ships. The total displacement of the Spanish Navy is approximately 220,000 tonnes. As of 2012, the Armada has a strength of 20,838 personnel.

Armada Española (Spanish Navy)

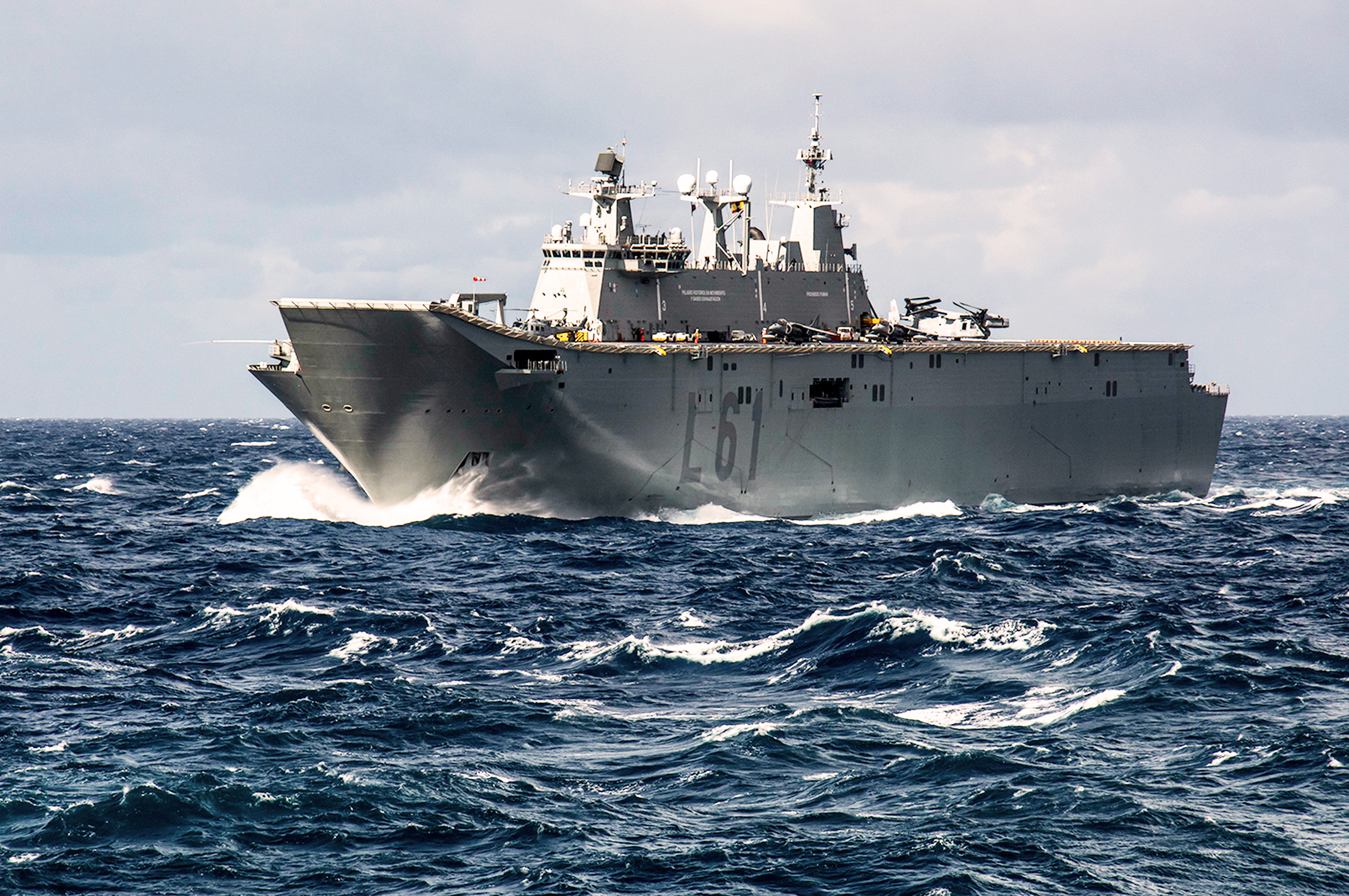
Amphibious assault ship-aircraft carrier Juan Carlos I

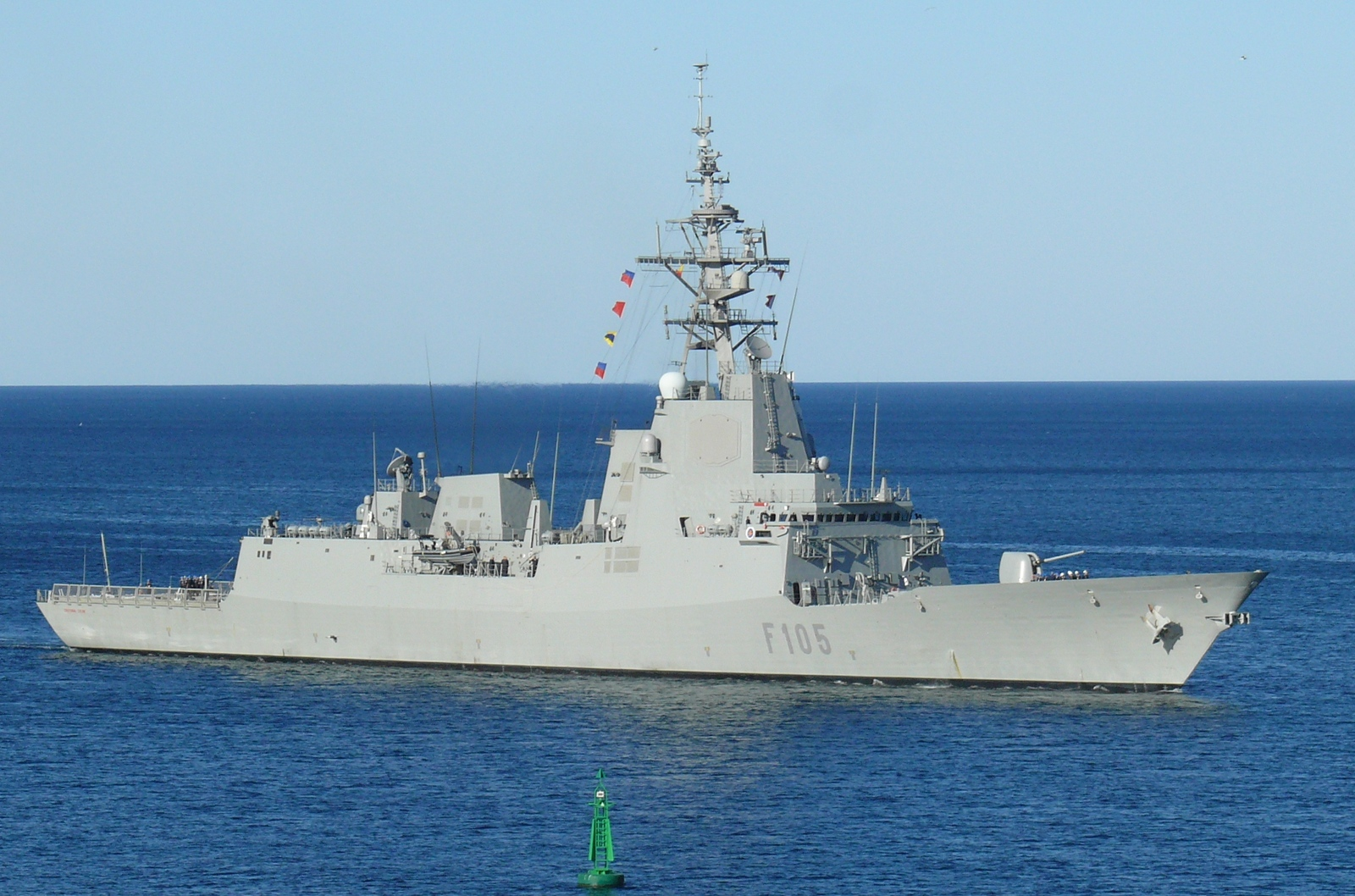
Álvaro de Bazán-class frigate Cristóbal Colón

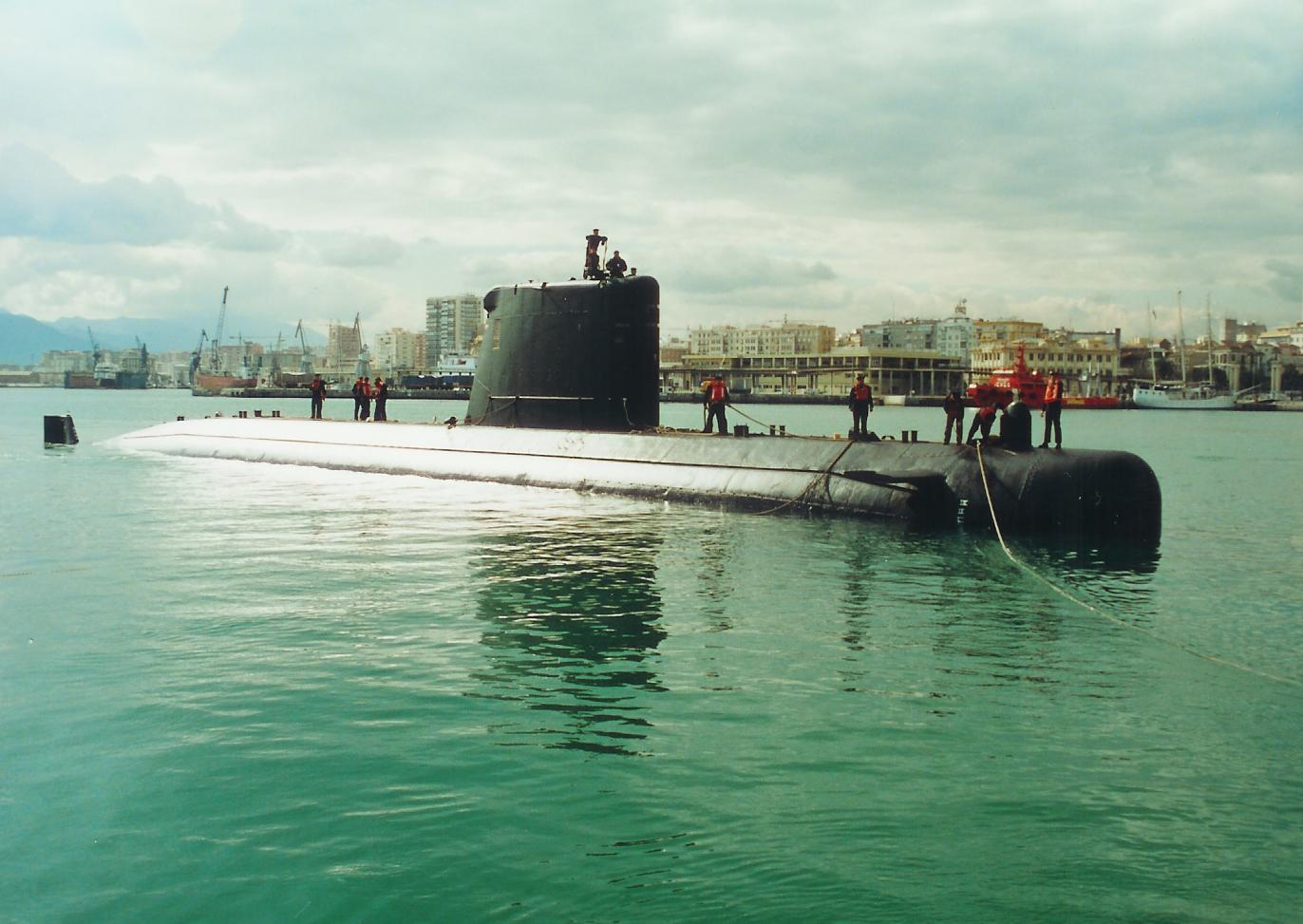
Agosta-class submarine Galerna

==== Marines ====
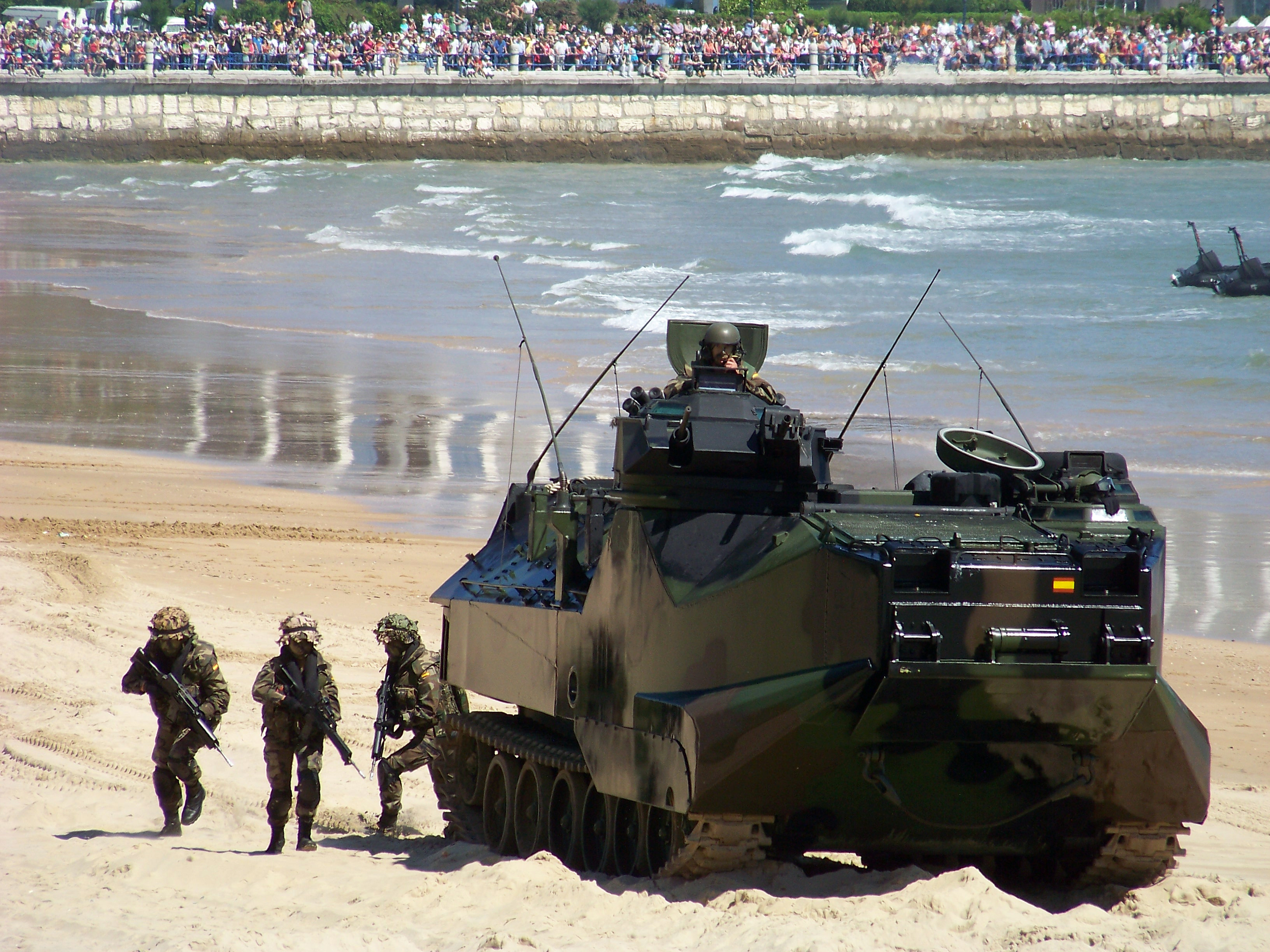
Spanish Marine Infantry deploying from an AAV-7 during an exhibition.

The Marines, in Spanish, Infanteria de Marina, are the marine infantry of the Spanish Navy, the oldest in the world. It has a strength of 5,000 troops divided into base defense forces and landing forces. One of the three base defense battalions is stationed with each of the Navy headquarters. "Groups" (midway between battalions and regiments) are stationed in Madrid and Las Palmas de Gran Canaria. The Tercio (fleet — regiment equivalent) is available for immediate embarkation and based out of San Fernando. Its principal weapons include light tanks, armored combat vehicles, self-propelled artillery, and SPIKE antitank missiles.

=== Air and Space Force ===
Spanish Air and Space Force currently has 10 fighter squadrons, each with 18–24 airplanes. The Air and Space Force also has 15 operational air bases around the country. The Air and Space Force operates a wide-ranging fleet of aircraft, from fighters to transport aircraft and passenger transports to helicopters. It maintains some 450 aircraft in total, of which around 130 are fighter aircraft (Eurofighter Typhoons and F-18 MLU). The Spanish Air and Space Force is replacing older aircraft in the inventory with newer ones including the recently introduced Eurofighter Typhoon and the Airbus A400M Atlas airlifter. Both are manufactured with Spanish participation; EADS CASA makes the Eurofighter's right wing and leading edge slats, and participates in the testing and assembly of the airlifter. Its aerobatic display team is the Patrulla Aguila, which flies the CASA C-101 Aviojet. Its helicopter display team, Patrulla Aspa, flies the Eurocopter EC-120 Colibrí. In July 2014 the Spanish Air Force joined the European Air Transport Command, headquartered at Eindhoven Airbase in the Netherlands.

Ejército del Aire y del Espacio (Spanish Air and Space Force)

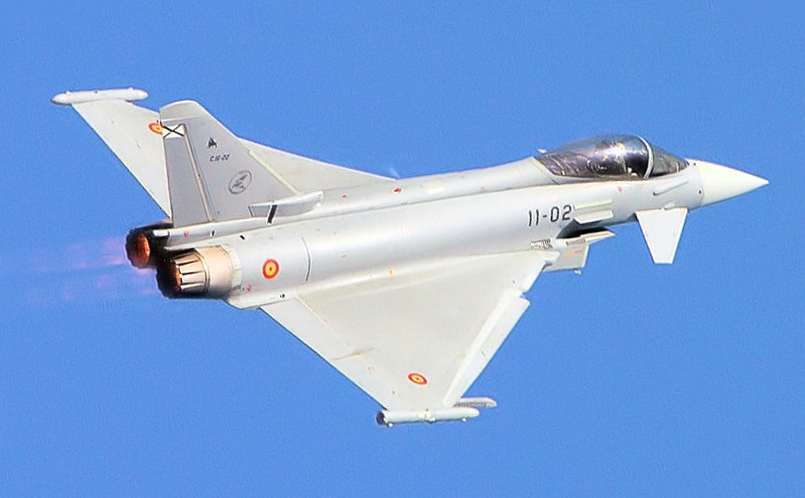
Eurofighter Typhoon

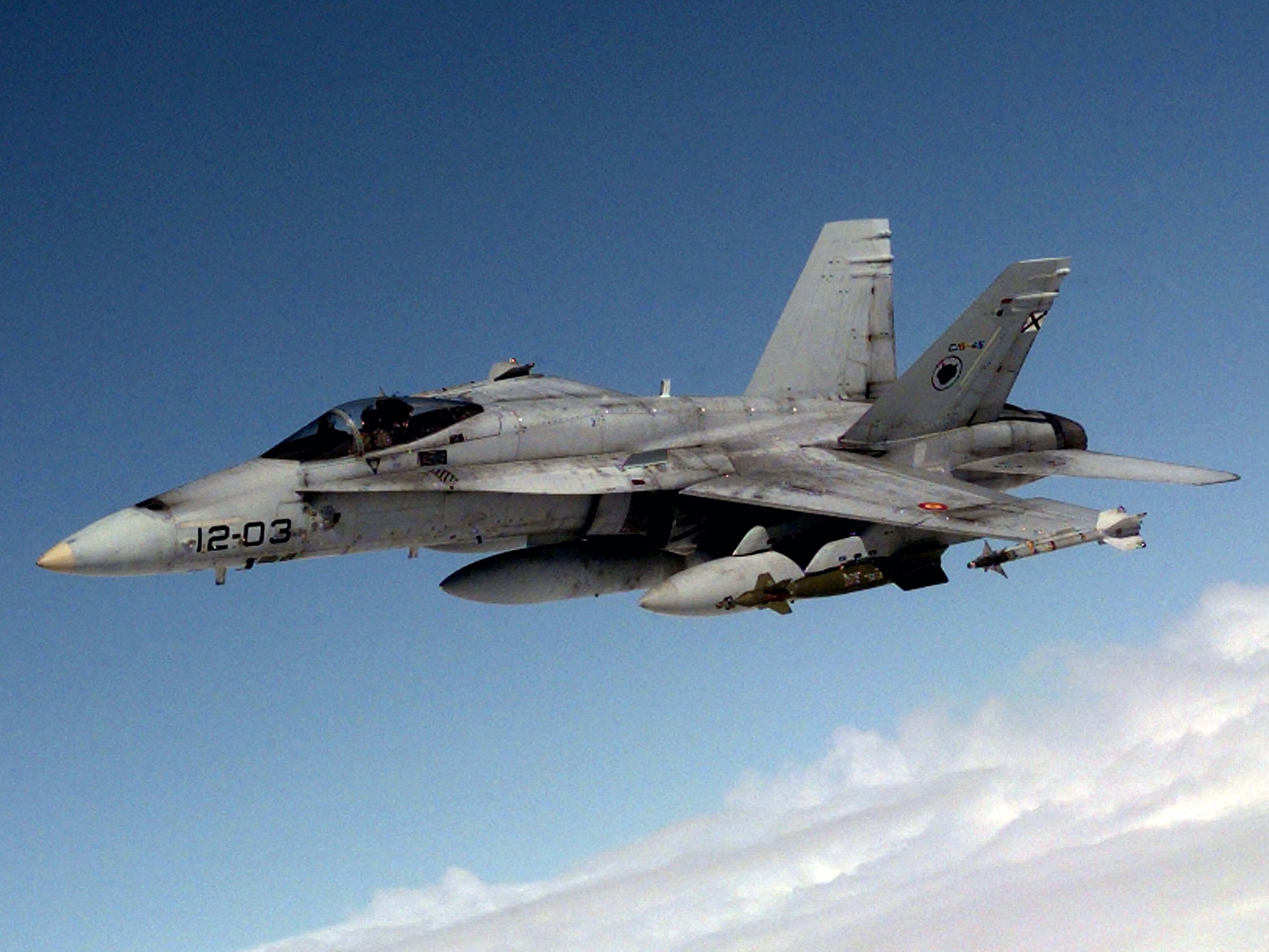
EF-18

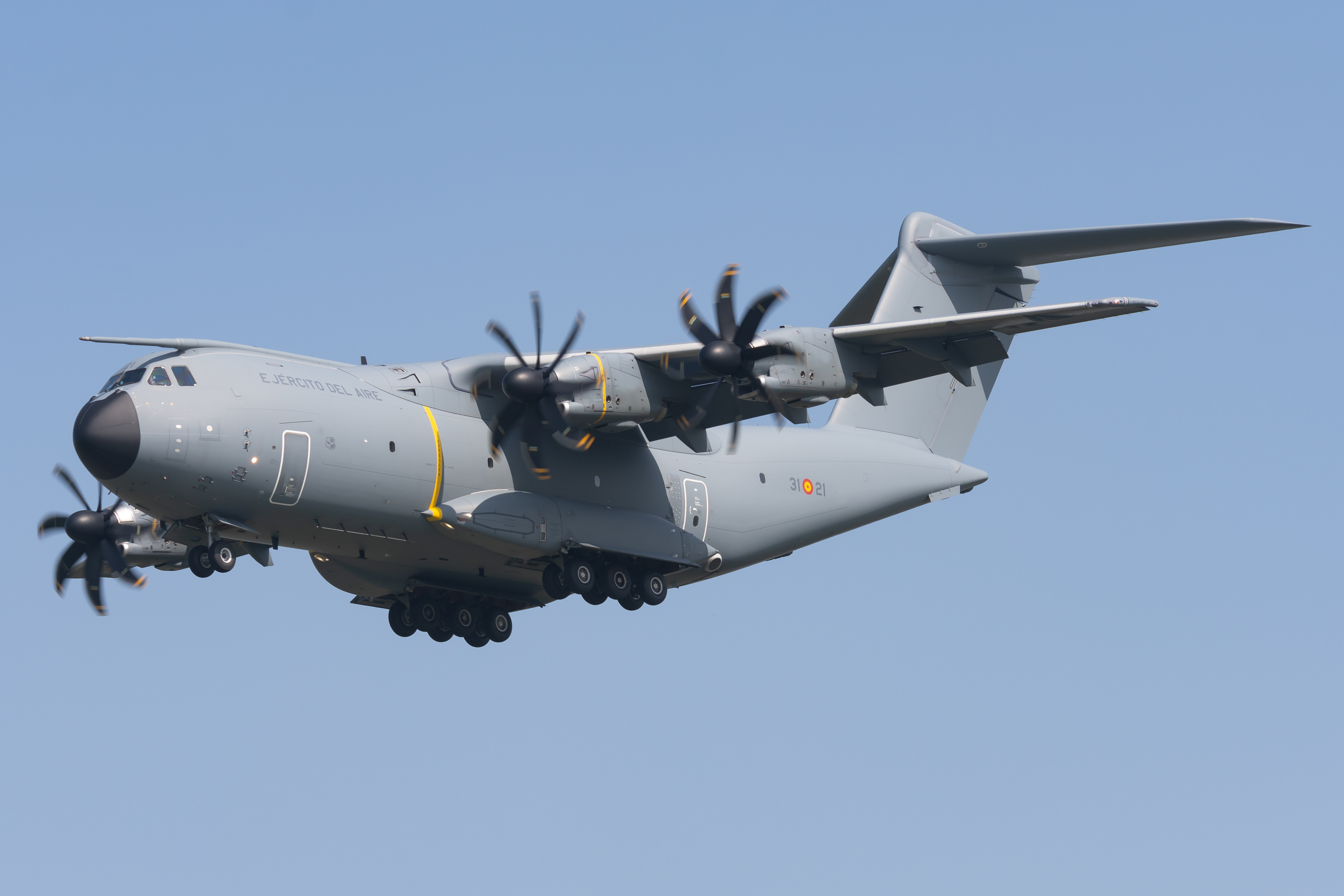
A400M

=== Common Corps ===
The Common Corps are four corps that provide professional services to all the branches of the Armed Forces and the Civil Guard. The Common Corps were created in the 1980s to unify the specialist corps of the different branches for operational reasons. The Common Corps are:

- Military Legal Corps
- Military Comptroller Corps
- Military Medical Corps
- Military Band Corps

=== Royal Guard ===
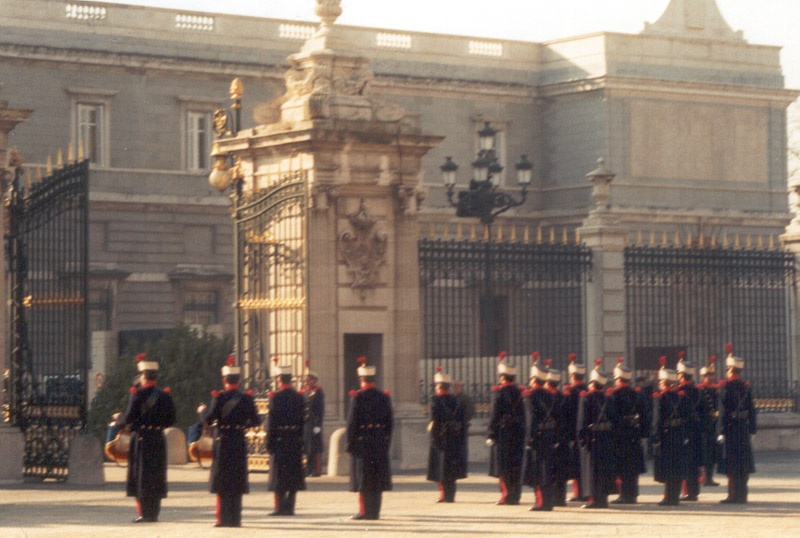
Spanish Royal Guard change at the Palacio Real.

The Royal Guard (Guardia Real) is an independent unit of the Spanish Armed Forces whose primary task is the military protection of the King of Spain and the Spanish royal family. It also protects visiting Heads of State.

The Royal Guard's history dates back to medieval times, the Corps of Gentlemen of the Chamber, the "Monteros de Espinosa", dating to 1006.

It currently has a strength of 1,900 troops, constituting a fully functional combat unit drawn from the ranks of all three branches of the Spanish Armed Forces: among others, a Marines company, a Paratroop company and an infantry company. Some units have served recently in Afghanistan and Bosnia.

=== Military Emergencies Unit ===
The Military Emergencies Unit (Spanish: Unidad Militar de Emergencias), is the most recently instituted branch of the Spanish Armed Forces, resulting from a decision of the Council of Ministers of Spain in 2005.

In addition to headquarters staff (Unidad de Cuartel General, there are five emergency intervention battalions (Batallon de Intervención en Emergencias, BIEM), a support regiment (Regimiento de Apoyo a Emergencias) and an aerial group (Agrupación de Medios Aéreos).

It is responsible for providing disaster relief principally throughout Spain but also if necessary abroad. The activities including handling natural hazards such as floods and earthquakes, forest fires, chemical and nuclear accidents, and other emergency situations recognized as such by the Prime Minister of Spain.

Unidad Militar de Emergencias (Military Emergencies Unit)

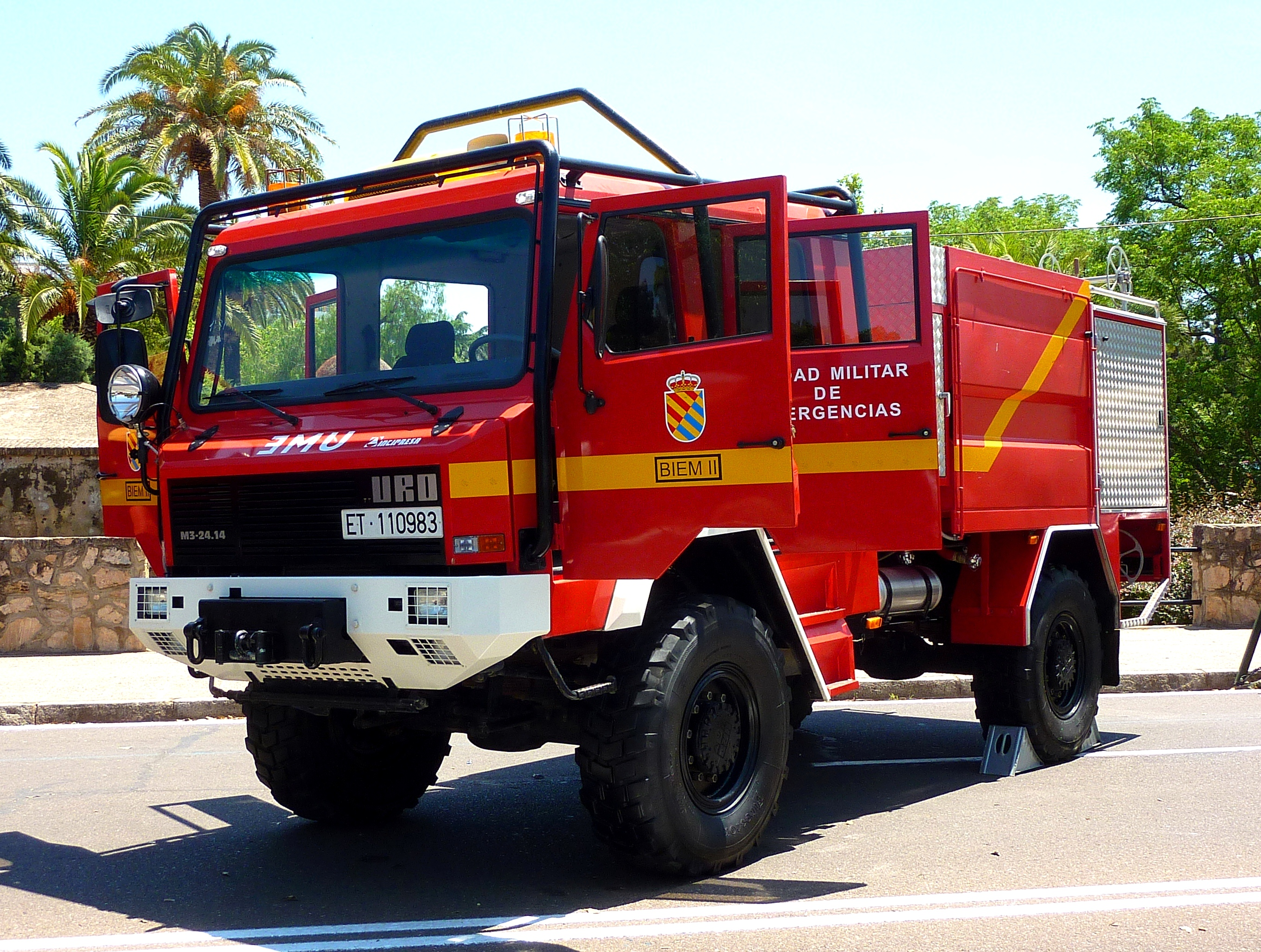
URO M3-24.14.

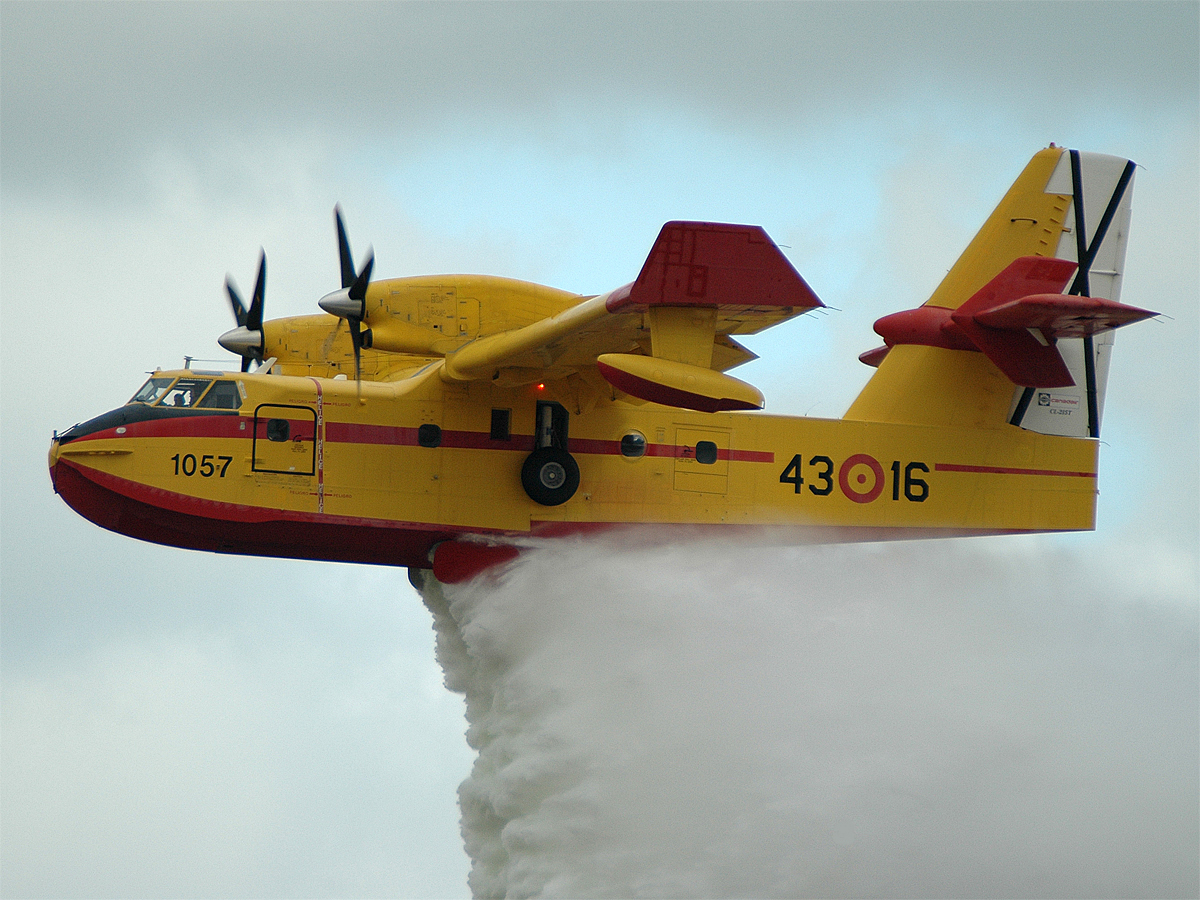
Canadair CL-215T

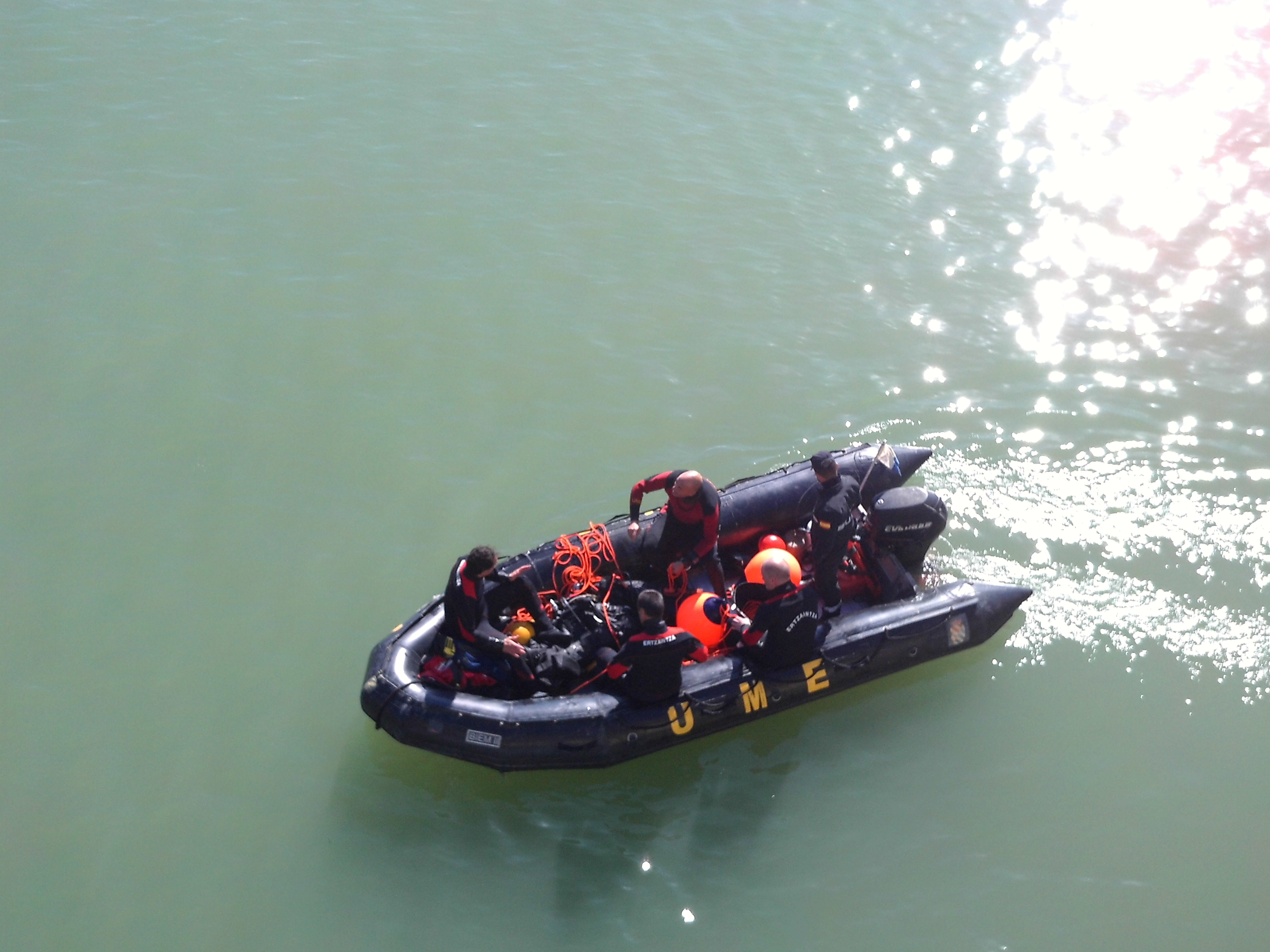
Inflatable boat Zodiac Mark IV

== Equipment of the Spanish Armed Forces ==
=== Spanish Army ===
- Equipment of the Spanish Army Or the same page in Spanish (with more information): Anexo:Materiales del Ejército de Tierra de España
- Air defence equipment of the Spanish Army
- Aircraft of the FAMET
- Tanks in the Spanish Army

=== Spanish Air Force ===
- Aircraft of the Spanish Air and Space Force
- Weapons of the Spanish Air Force
- Air defence equipment of the Spanish Air Force

=== Spanish Navy ===
- List of active Spanish Navy ships
- Aircraft of the Spanish Navy

=== Spanish Marine Infantry ===
- Equipment of the Spanish Marine Infantry
