= Santa Bárbara Sistemas 155/52 =

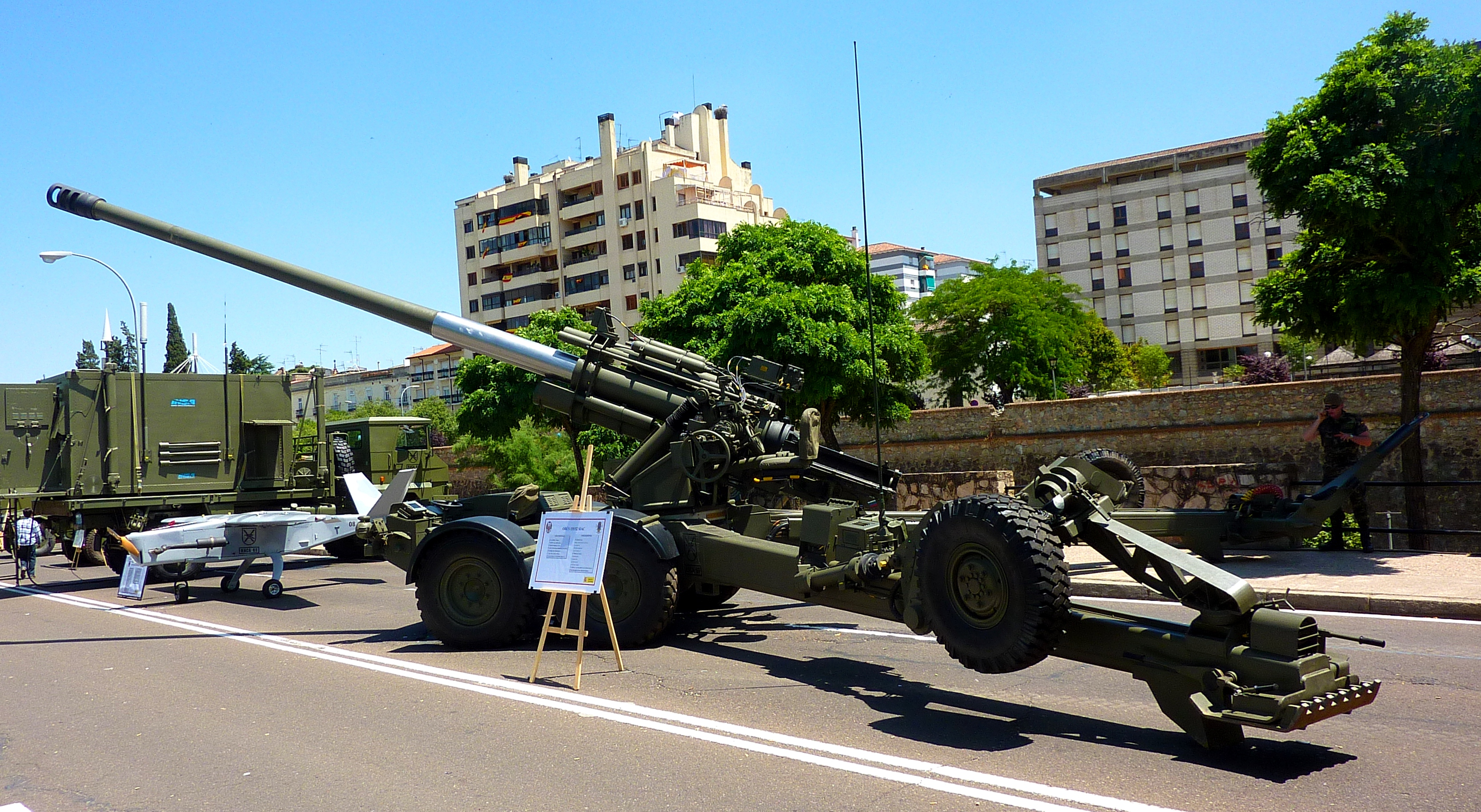
- Type: Howitzer
- Place of origin: Spain

Service history
- In service: 2002–present
- Used by: Colombia; Spain; El Salvador

Production history
- No. built: 111

Specifications
- Mass: 13,500 kg (29,800 lb)
- Length: 10.3 m (33 ft 10 in)
- Barrel length: 8.12 m (26 ft 8 in) L/52
- Width: 2.8 m (9 ft 2 in)
- Height: 2.2 m (7 ft 3 in)
- Shell: Separate loading charge and projectiles
- Calibre: 155 mm (6.1 in) NATO
- Action: Hydraulic loader
- Breech: Interrupted screw
- Recoil: Hydro-pneumatic
- Carriage: Split trail
- Elevation: −3° to +72°
- Traverse: 40°
- Rate of fire: 10 rpm
- Effective firing range: 30 km (19 mi) conventional
- Maximum firing range: 40 km (25 mi) rocket-assisted projectile.
- Engine: Diesel APU; 106 hp (79 kW)
- Maximum speed: 18 km/h (11 mph)

The Santa Bárbara Sistemas 155/52 is a modern field howitzer designed and manufactured by the Spanish armament manufacturer Santa Bárbara Sistemas (SBS) a division of General Dynamics and was produced from 2002 to 2009 at the La Vega and Trubia factories in Asturias.

== Design ==
The Santa Bárbara Sistemas 155/52 has a split trail carriage, hydro-pneumatic recoil mechanism, interrupted screw breech, rifled autofretted barrel, articulated suspension with four pneumatic tires, and a muzzle brake. The barrel is produced by the German company Rheinmetall, while the gun carriage is produced by SBS.

For transport, the split trail carriage can be closed and the barrel and rotated 180° while being towed by an IVECO Pegaso 6x6 artillery tractor. There is also a 106 hp (79 kW) diesel auxiliary power unit (APU) at the front of the carriage with a driver's station that can move the gun at 18 km/h (11 mph) over short distances. The APU also powers the hydraulic automatic gun-laying system (AGLS) that controls elevation, traverse, spreading, and retraction. Two retractable wheels on the tail of the gun carriage can be lowered when the gun is being moved by the APU.

The howitzer fires a variety of separate loading NATO standard projectiles, including extended-range base bleed and rocket-assisted projectiles up to 40 km (25 mi). The howitzer has a hydraulic ammunition loader that can be loaded at any angle and provides a high rate of fire.

== Models ==
- Santa Bárbara Sistemas 155/52 APU-SIAC – is a model for the Spanish Army. 70 units were ordered and 66 were produced. Each of the howitzers is equipped with Thales PR4G radios and the same Digital Navigation Aiming and Pointing System (DINAPS) used by the L118 and M109A5E. The DINAPS is a modular hybrid system that combines inertial navigation, global positioning system, and a muzzle velocity radar (MVR) that connects to the Spanish Army command and control system (C2). The order cost approximately 181 million Euros.
- Santa Bárbara Sistemas 155/52 APU (V07) – is an upgraded coastal artillery model. There are 16 in service with the Coastal Artillery Regiment No. 4 (Regimiento de Artillería de Costa nº 4) of the Spanish Army. The system software is specialized for tracking and firing at mobile naval targets instead of static land targets.
- The Santa Bárbara Sistemas 155/52 APU-SBT – is a model for the Colombian Army. 25 units were ordered and 15 were produced, with 9 delivered in 2006 followed by 7 delivered in 2007. The order cost approximately 13.5 million Euros.

== Gallery ==
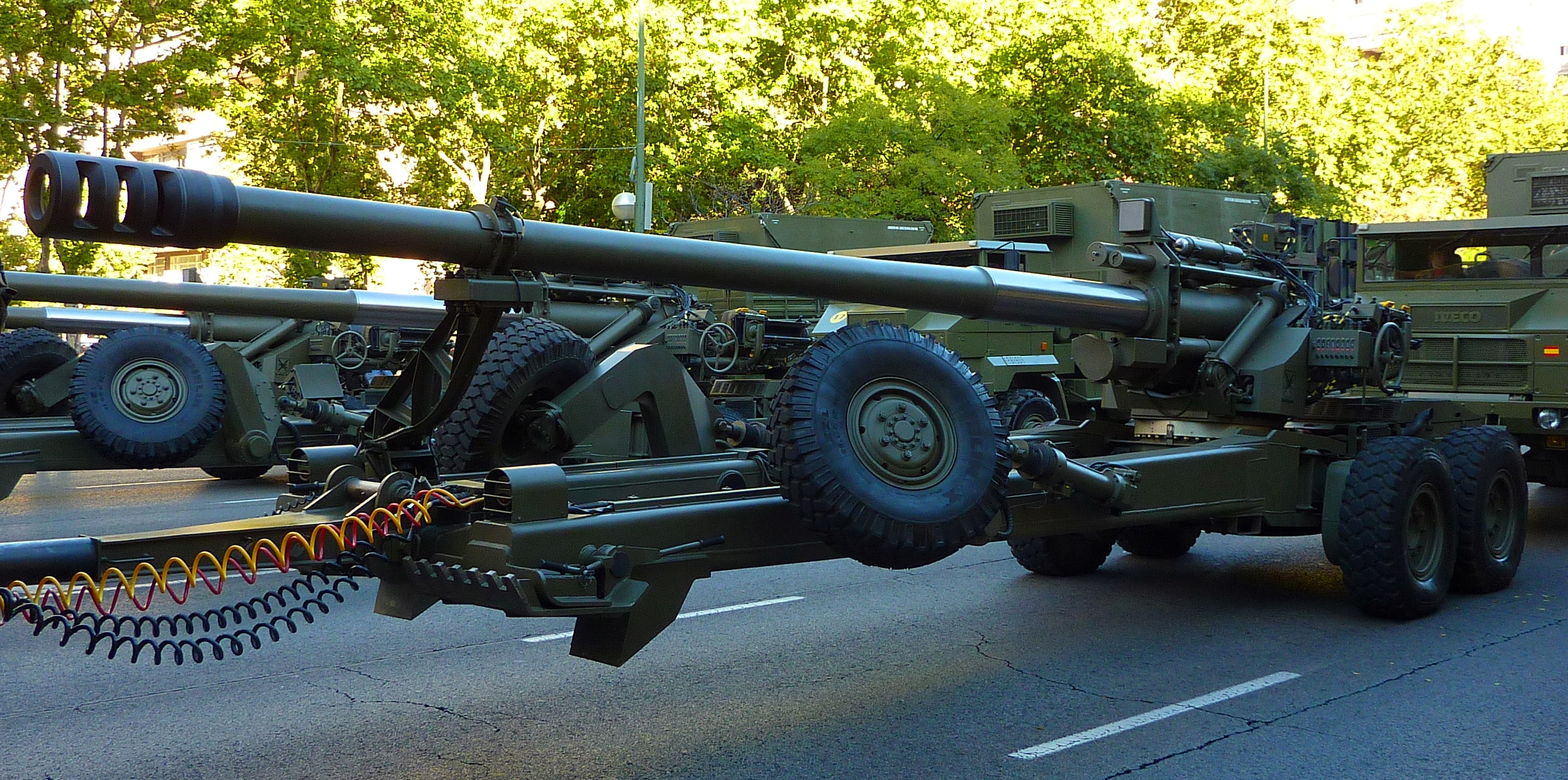
A howitzer with folded trails and barrel rotated for transport.

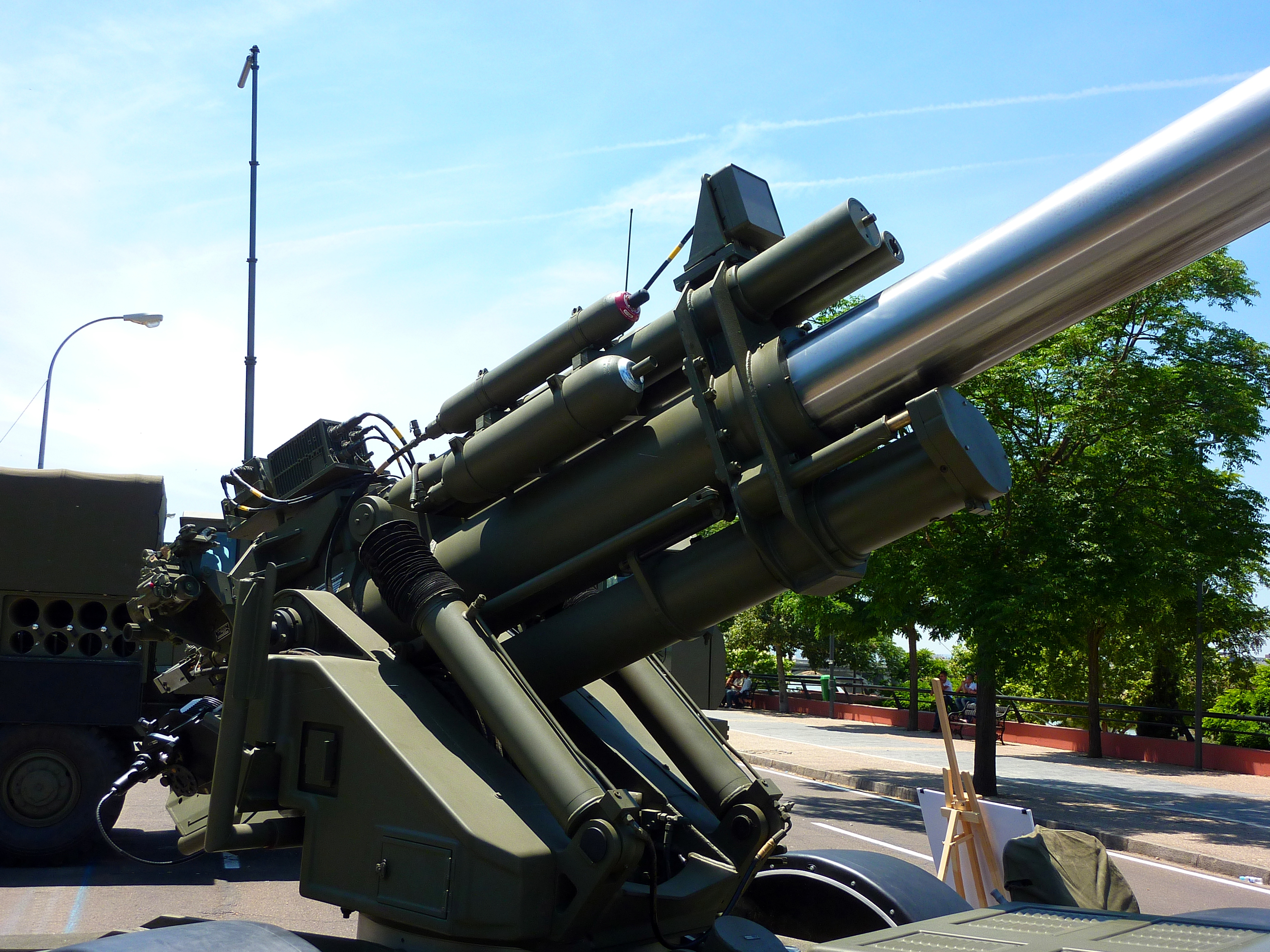
The hydraulic traverse, elevation and recoil mechanisms.

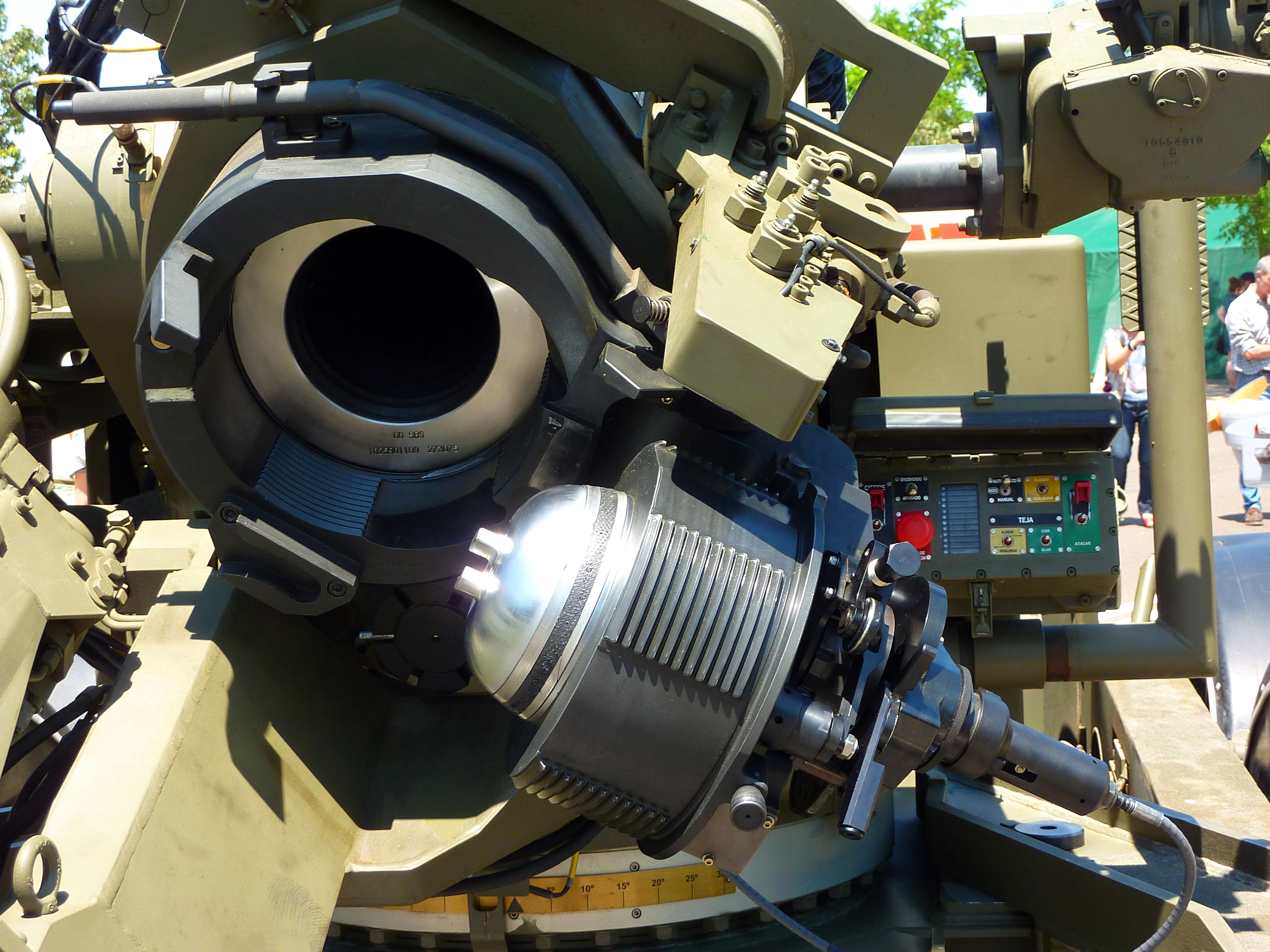
The interrupted screw breech with loading mechanism.

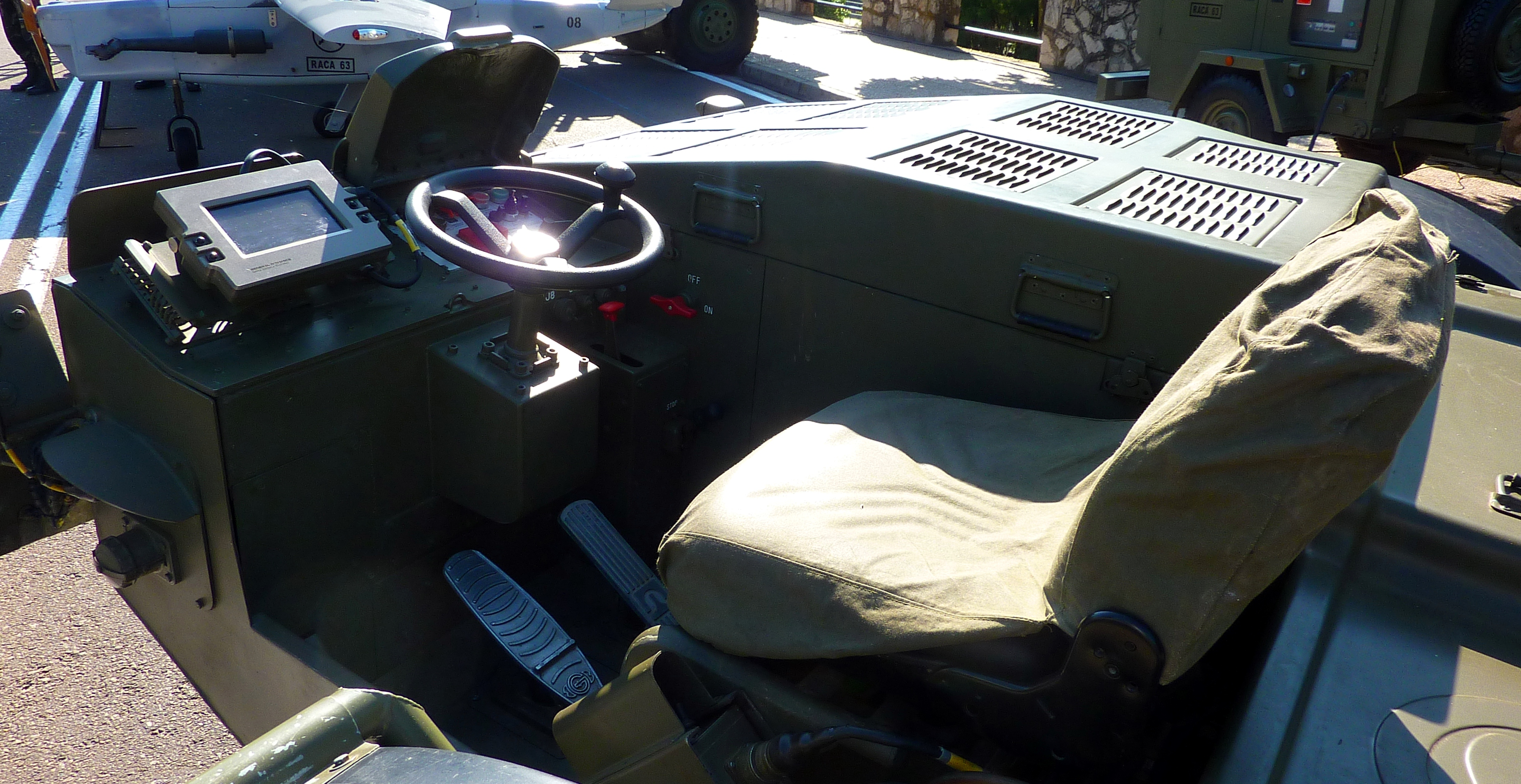
The driving station with the auxiliary power unit to the right.

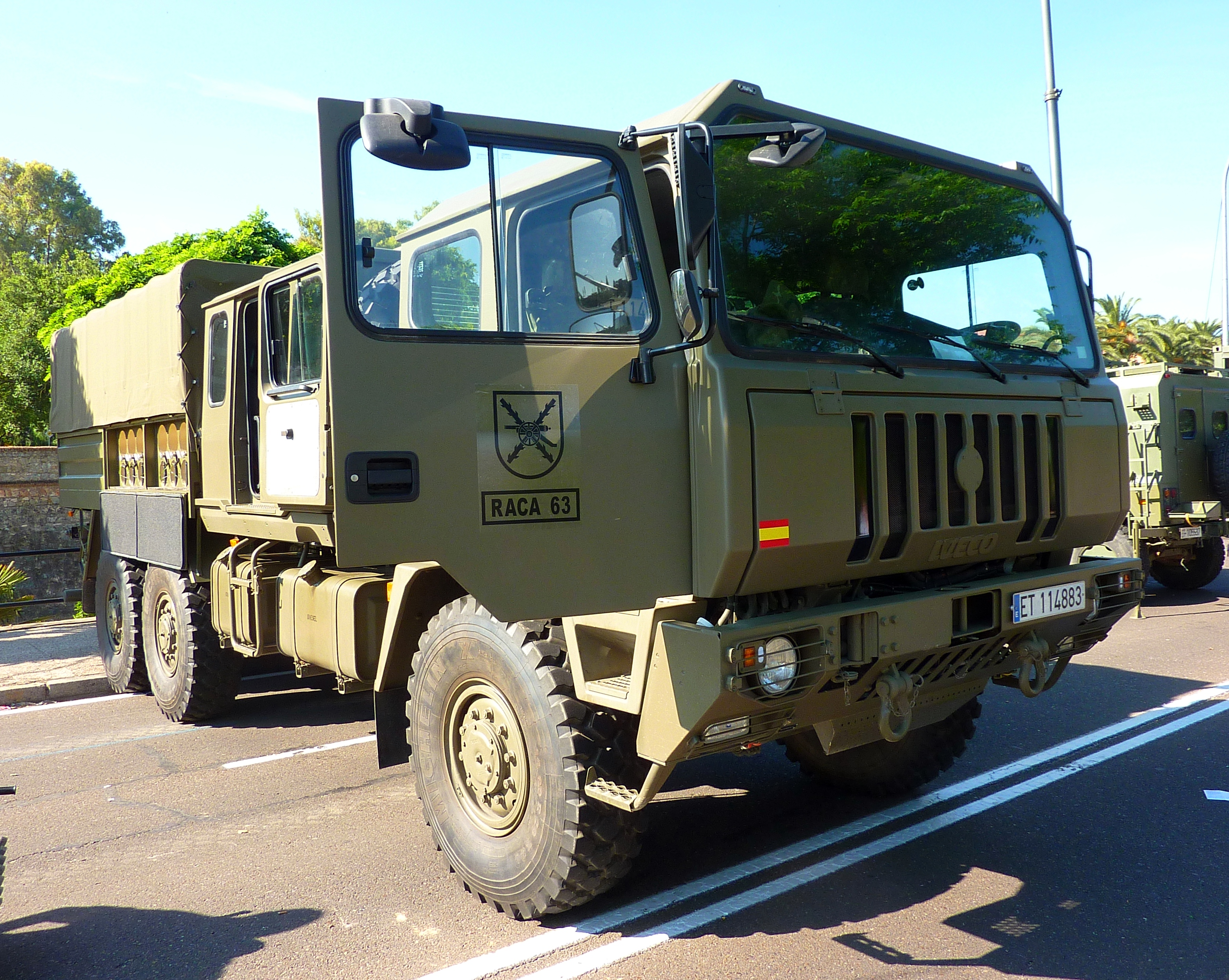
The IVECO Pegaso 6x6 artillery tractor that carries the ammunition, supplies and gun crew.

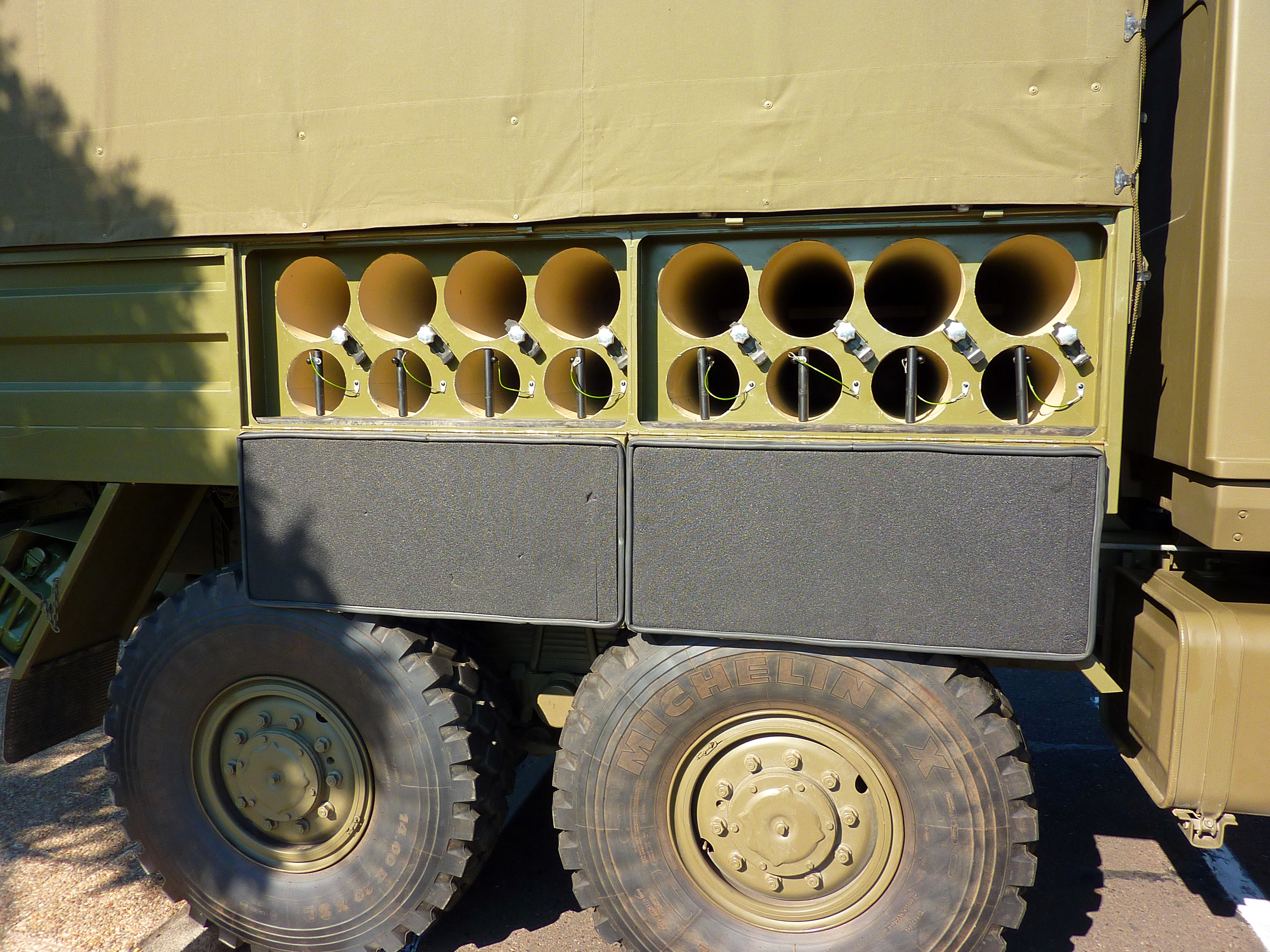
Ammunition storage aboard the artillery tractor.
