= Spanish Army Airmobile Force =

- Fuerzas Aeromóviles del Ejército de Tierra
- Coat of arms of the FAMET
- Founded: 1965
- Country: Spain
- Branch: Spanish Army
- Type: Army aviation branch
- Role: Battlefield support, battlefield transport and reconnaissance
- Size: 5 battalions 104 aircraft
- Garrison/HQ: HQ - Colmenar Viejo - Madrid; Bétera (Valencia), Agoncillo (La Rioja) (La Rioja), Almagro (Ciudad Real), Dos Hermanas (Sevilla), San Cristóbal de La Laguna (Santa Cruz de Tenerife), Detachment in Melilla.
- Motto(s): Sicut in coelo et in terra As well in the sky as in the ground
- Engagements: Ifni War (1957)

Insignia
- Roundel

- Fin Flash

- Pilot Wings

- Guidon

Aircraft flown
- Attack: BO-105, UH-1H, Tigre
- Patrol: Eurocopter Cougar
- Reconnaissance: Eurocopter Cougar, Bell 212
- Trainer: Eurocopter EC 135
- Transport: Eurocopter Super Puma, Eurocopter Cougar, CH-47 Chinook, UH-1H

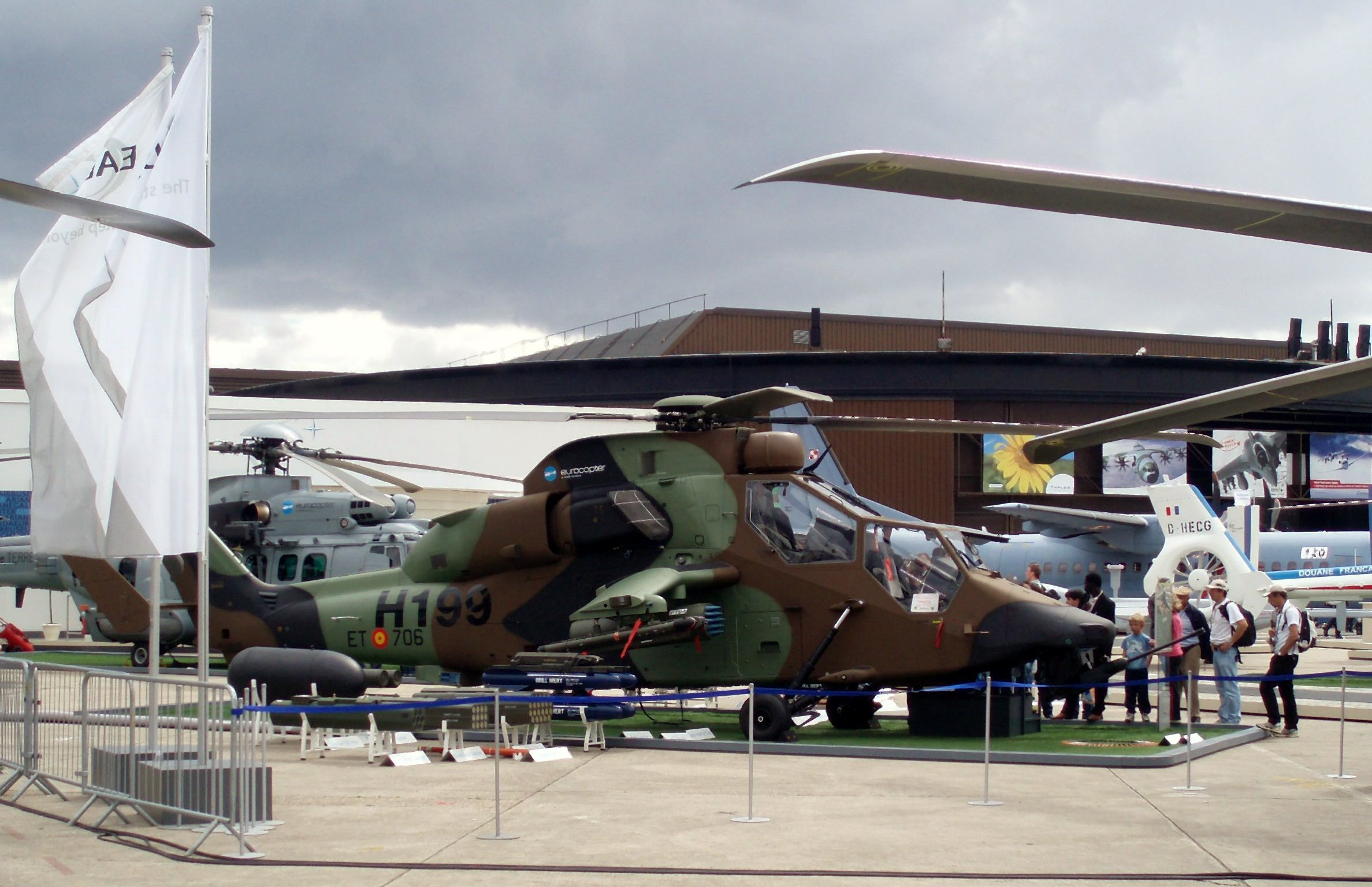
Spanish Eurocopter Tigre at Paris Air Show 2007

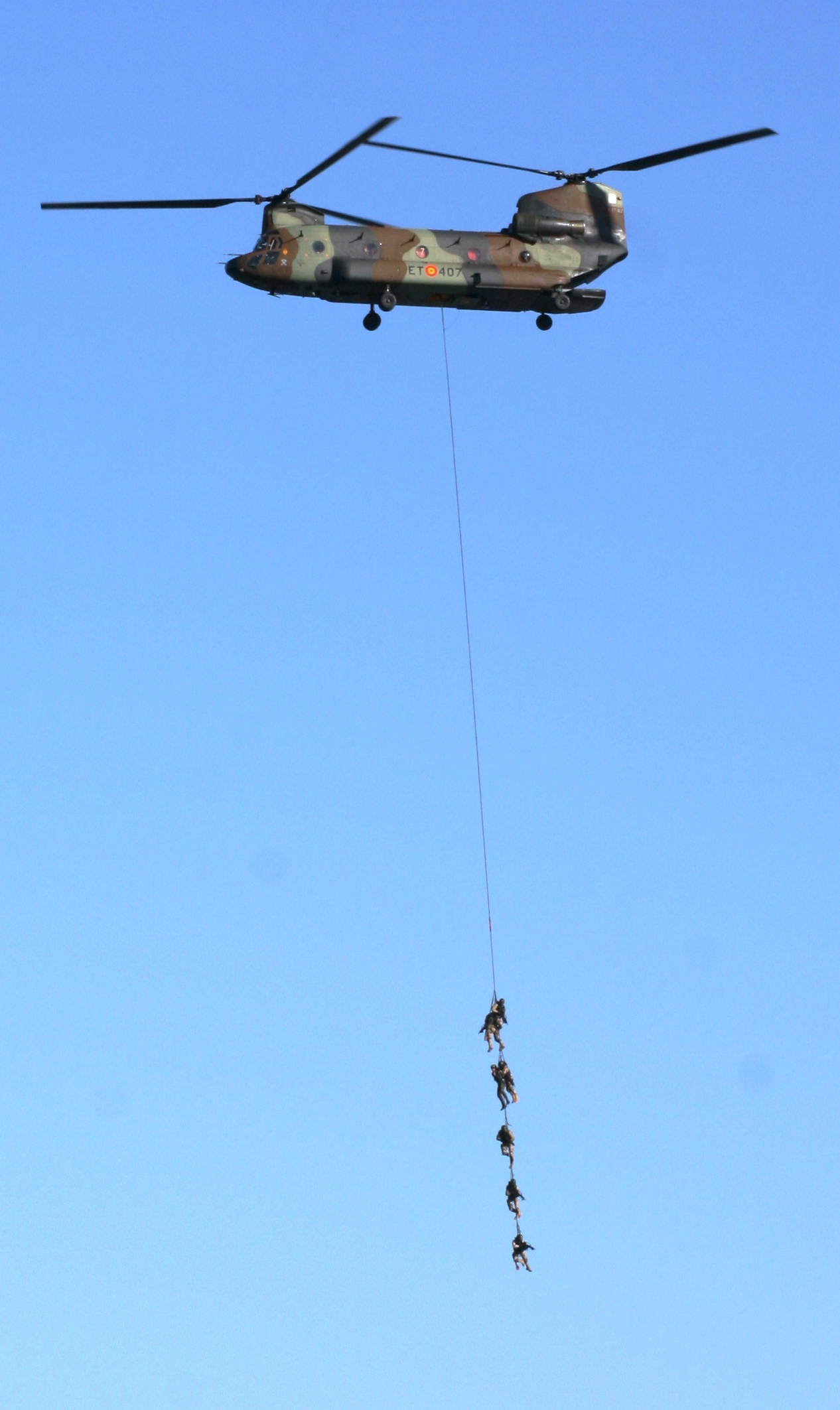
Spanish CH-47D Chinook with the new color scheme during a Special Operations exhibition in Santander

The Army Airmobile Force (Spanish: Fuerzas Aeromóviles del Ejército de Tierra, FAMET) is the army aviation branch of the Spanish Army. An Independent Army Aviation force was formed in 1965 as Aviación Ligera del Ejército de Tierra (Army Light Air Force) and renamed FAMET in 1973.

== Organization ==
- Headquarter (Colmenar Viejo - Madrid)
- Melilla Permanent Detachment -- (Melilla)

=== Order of Battle ===
- Attack Helicopter Battalion #1 -- BHELA I (Almagro - Ciudad Real)

Almagro (LEAO)
Batallón (Battalion)	Aircraft Type	Codes	Coat of Arms
BHELA I	Eurocopter Tigre	HA.28	

- Emergency Helicopter Battalion # 2 -- BHELEME II (Bétera - Valencia)

Bétera/Valencia (LEBT)
Batallón (Battalion)	Aircraft Type	Codes	Coat of Arms
BHELEME II	Eurocopter Super Puma Eurocopter Cougar	HU.21 HT.28	

- Maneuver Helicopter Battalion # 3 -- BHELMA III (Agoncillo - Logroño)

Agoncillo/Logroño (LELO)
Batallón (Battalion)	Aircraft Type	Codes	Coat of Arms
BHELMA III	NH90 "Sarrio"	HT.29	

- Maneuver Helicopter Battalion # 4 -- BHELMA IV (El Copero - Sevilla)

Sevilla/El Copero (LEEC)
Batallón (Battalion)	Aircraft Type	Codes	Coat of Arms
BHELMA IV	Eurocopter Super Puma	HT.21	

- Transport Helicopter Battalion # 5 -- BHELTRA V (Colmenar Viejo - Madrid)
- FAMET Transmission Battalion -- BTRANS (Colmenar Viejo - Madrid)
- FAMET Logistic Support Unit -- ULOG (Colmenar Viejo - Madrid)
- Helicopter Maintenance Center -- PCMHEL (Colmenar Viejo - Madrid)
- FAMET Training Center -- CEFAMET (Colmenar Viejo - Madrid)
- Quarter service unit of "Coronel Maté" Base -- USBA "Coronel Maté" (Colmenar Viejo - Madrid)

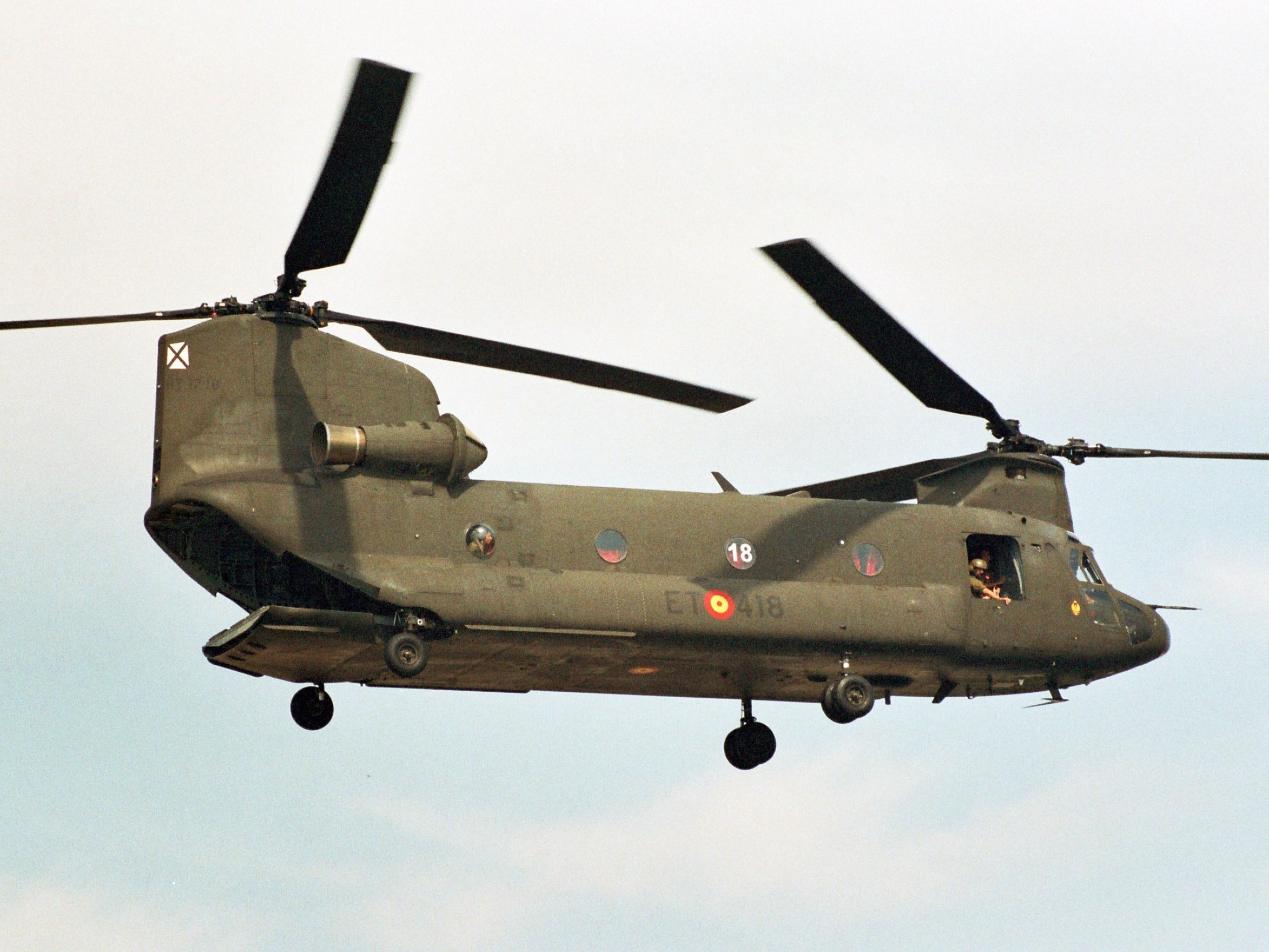
CH-47 Chinook helicopter

Colmenar Viejo (LECV)
Batallón (Battalion)	Aircraft Type	Codes	Coat of Arms
BHELTRA V	CH-47 Chinook	HT.17	
BTRANS/ FAMET HQ	Eurocopter Super Puma AS-332VIP,AS-532L, AS-532AL	HT.21HT.27,HT.28	
CEFAMET	Eurocopter EC 135	HE.26	
PCMHEL	Eurocopter Super Puma		

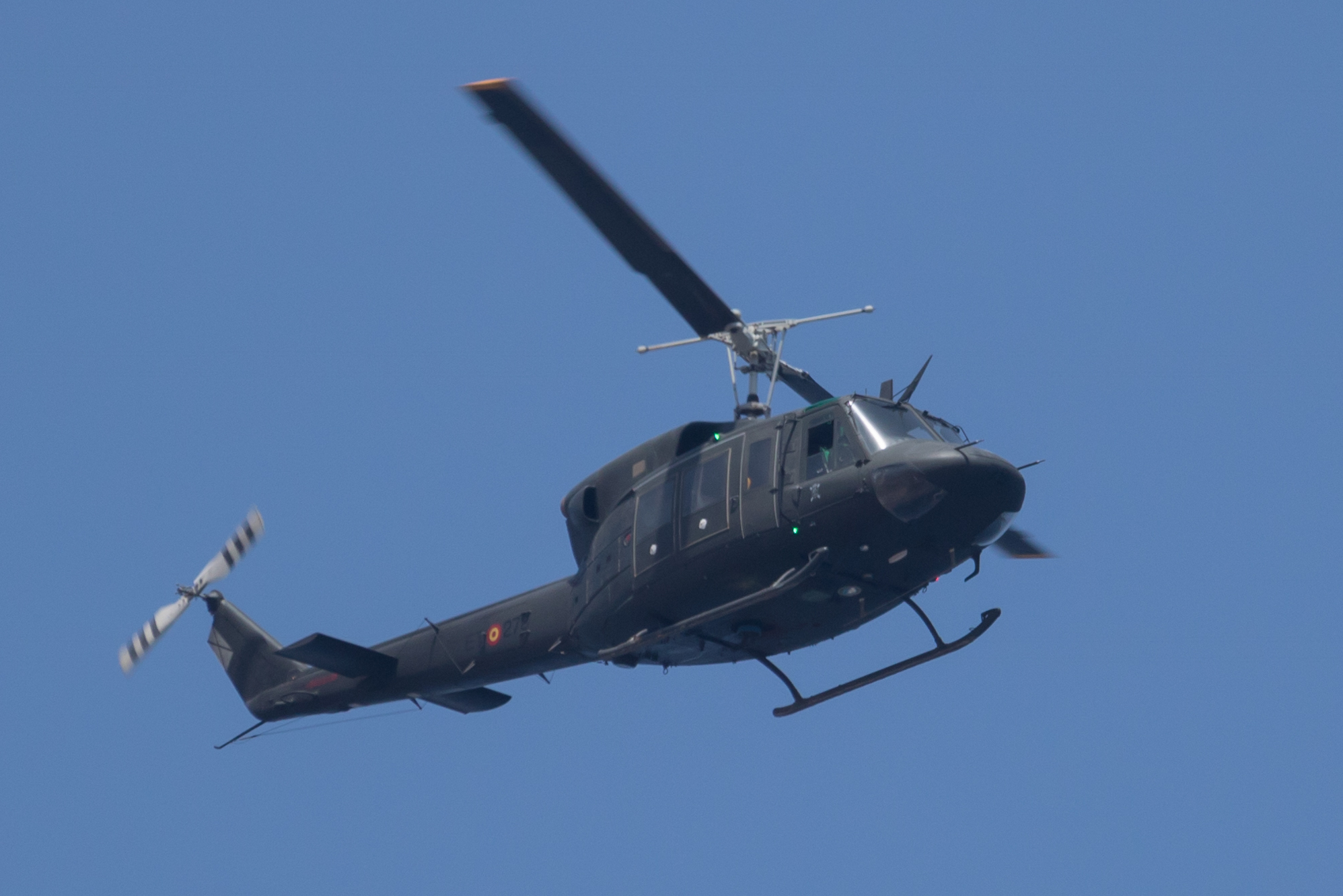
An AB-212 over Tenerife in 2018

- Maneuver Helicopter Battalion # 6 -- BHELMA VI (Los Rodeos - Tenerife)

Los Rodeos - Tenerife
Batallón (Battalion)	Aircraft Type	Codes	Coat of Arms
BHELMA VI	Agusta-Bell 212	HU.18	

== Aircraft ==
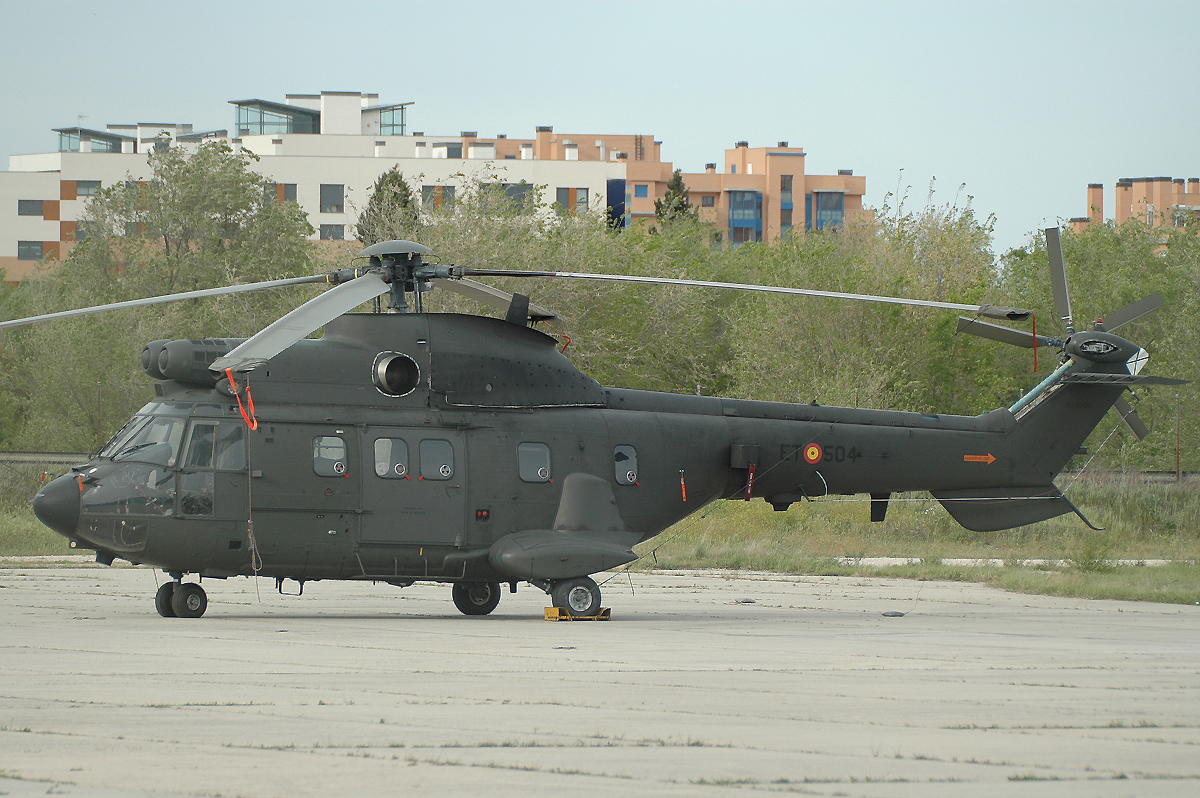
Eurocopter AS332B1 Super Puma helicopter

== Historic Aircraft ==
- Bell UH-1B Iroquois
- Bell UH-1H Iroquois
- Boeing-Vertol CH-47C Chinook
- MBB Bo.105C
