= MCCD =

MCCD may refer to:

- Medical Certificate of Cause of Death
- Marin Community College District in California
- Maricopa Community College District in Arizona
- Georgia Motor Carrier Compliance Division, a division of the Georgia Department of Public Safety
- Joint Cyber-Defence Command, the cyber defence service of the Spanish Defence Staff
