= Gonzalo Rodríguez Martín-Granizo =

Spanish Navy officer

Chief of Defence
- In office 18 May 1990 – 16 December 1992
- Monarch: Juan Carlos I
- Prime Minister: Felipe González
- Minister: Narcís Serra (as Defence minister); Julián García Vargas (as Defence minister)
- Vice PM: Alfonso Guerra; Narcís Serra
- Preceded by: Air Lieutenant General Gonzalo Puigcerver Romá
- Succeeded by: Army Lieutenant General José Rodrigo Rodrigo

Chief of the Joint Defence Staff
- In office 25 November 1986 – 29 December 1987
- Preceded by: José Pardo de Santayana y Coloma
- Succeeded by: Vice Admiral Pedro Regalado Aznar

Personal details
- Born: 25 January 1928 León, Spain
- Died: 16 December 1990 (aged 62) Hospital del Aire, Madrid, Spain

Military service
- Allegiance: Spain
- Branch/service: Spanish Navy
- Years of service: 1946—1992
- Rank: Admiral General (1999)
- Unit: Spanish Navy Spain
- Commands: Almirante Cervera destroyer: Fleet General Staff (Fleet Commander); Navy General Staff (assistant); Chief of the Joint Defence Staff; Chief of Defence Staff

Gonzalo Rodríguez Martín-Granizo (25 January 1928 – 16 December 1990) was a Spanish Navy officer who served as Chief of the Defence Staff from May 1990 until his death in December 1992. He also served as chief of the Defence Staff from November 1986 to December 1987.

Martín-Granizo was a commander of the commander of the Fleet of the Spanish Navy. He was born 25 February 1928 in León and enrolled in the Spanish Military at the age of 18, in 1946. He was promoted to second lieutenant in 1951 and served on different battleships, including the Almirante Cervera, Sánchez Barcáiztegui ship, Canarias cruiser, and the Alava destroyer. He also commanded the Marqués de la Ensenada destroyer. He then moved to the Naval Military School, served at the Fleet General Staff, became chief of the Strategy Division of the Navy General Staff in 1984, and assistant chief of the Navy General Staff in 1986.

One of his contributions to the Spanish military was completing a coordination agreement with NATO while in office. He also supervised Spanish participation in the Persian Gulf region, Kurdistan and Yugoslavia.

== Commands ==
He rose to become the Chief of the Joint Defence Staff in 1986, a position auxiliary to the Chief of the Defence Staff, and was promoted to admiral in 1987, after which he became commander of the commander of the Fleet. He became the Chief of Defense Staff in 1989. After his death, the CHOD position was intended to be occupied by admiral Pedro Regalado Aznar, but due to an eye problem, the Chief of the army (El Jemad) at the time, General Ramón Porgueres, took over the office.

== Death ==
He died in 1992 after two years in office from a brain hemorrhage at Hospital del Aire in Madrid after being admitted. (Note: This article appear in print edition of El Pais, Wednesday, December 16, 1992)

== Honors ==
In honor of him, a Fleet Headquarters building was renamed after him by the Chief of Naval of the Spanish Navy. He was posthumously promoted to Admiral General of the Navy in 1999 as a recognition of his meritorious service.

== Notes ==
Military offices
Preceded by José Pardo de Santayana y Coloma	Chief of the Joint Defence Staff; 1986–1987	Succeeded by Vice Admiral Pedro Regalado Aznar
Military offices
Preceded by Air Lieutenant General Gonzalo Puigcerver Romá	Chief of the Defence Staff; 1990—1992	Succeeded by Army Lieutenant General José Rodrigo Rodrigo
