= Gonzalo Puigcerver Romá =

Chief of Defence
- In office 31 October 1986 – 18 May 1990
- Monarch: Juan Carlos I
- Prime Minister: Felipe González
- Minister: Narcís Serra (as Defence minister); Julián García Vargas (as Defence minister)
- Preceded by: Admiral General Ángel Liberal Lucini
- Succeeded by: Admiral Gonzalo Rodríguez Martín-Granizo

Personal details
- Born: 14 March 1924 Alicante, Spain
- Died: 20 February 2012 (aged 87) Madrid, Spain
- Education: Academia General del Aire

Military service
- Allegiance: Spain
- Branch/service: Spanish Air and Space Force
- Years of service: 1945—1990, 1990– 1996 (as second reserve)
- Rank: General of Air
- Unit: Spanish Air Force
- Commands: JEMAD, Military Quarter of King Juan Carlos I, Alert and Control Wing, Air Sector Zaragoza, Chief of the Material Command of the Air Force, Canary Islands Area Air Command

Gonzalo Puigcerver Romá (died 2012) was a Spanish Military general of the Airforce who became the Chief of the Defense Staff in October 1986 until 1990. He is the first of air soldier of Spanish armed forces to hold the position and was appointed under the Royal Decree 2299/1986.

== Early life ==
He was born March 14, 1924, in San Juan, Alicante, he attended both elementary and high schools in Alicante, and completed his high school in Palma de Mallorca 1939 during the civil war his family resided there.

== Military career ==
He began studying for Naval and Mining Engineering, before enrolling into the Academia General del Aire (General Air Academy) and graduated as a member of 1st class batch in 1949, he was promoted to lieutenant after graduating and was moved to 32nd Aviation Regiment in Alicante.

He became captain still serving at the 32nd Regiment, he was posted to Unit A Services number 6 of the La Rabasa Air Base in 1952 until when he went on to the Higher School of Flight Salamanca in 1953 to study the Flight without Visibility Course and left with B and E qualification, he did carry out a practice of flight of about 100 hours in the Civil Air Lines.

He later in the middle year of 1954, he attended an intensive English Course in the United States, he attended the Instruction Course in Fürstenfeldbrück Air Base German for diploma in Harvard Transition Instructor and moved on to Basic Pilot School Matacán as flight trainer in North American T-6.

He became a Squadron leader in 1957 from which he attended General Staff Course to complete it high diploma in 1958, after graduating, he returns to as a Air Staff officer of which later in the early 60s, he went on to attend Talavera la Real Badajoz for Reactors Course and of that, he attended a Combat Crews Course at Lucke Air Base for Lockheed T-33 and North American F-86 Saber, he returns to Wing 5 Morón de la Frontera, Seville and in moved on to Armed Forces HQ, he served in the Torrejón de Ardoz base Madrid then follow a promotion to wing commander in 1969 and continued serving at the General Staff of the Defense Command, he was moved to Ala 12 Torrejón de Ardoz in 1971 and until when he transferred to Air General Staff in 1975, after a promotion to group captain (colonel), he was made the chief of the Alert and Control Wing in 1976, he became the chief of the Operations Division in 1979 and fellows an appointment as in 1982 as the deputy chief of Air Transport Command and chief Air Sector Zaragoza. He lectured the Jerez de la Frontera Flight School and at the Salamanca Pilots School, he was moved to Defense Air Force HQ and later in the Air Defense General Staff HQ.

He became chief of the Canary Islands and Area Air Command in 1984 before an appointment to serve as Chief of the Material Command of the Air Force.

He was the head of Military Quarter of the Royal House of King Juan Carlos I in 1985 and represents him in various occasions until October 1986 when he was appointed as the JEMAD (CHODS) by the Council of Ministers as Chief of the Defense Staff, and at the same time the Natural Councilor of the Council of State until when moved to the Second Reserve in 1990.

He left the office of JEMAD in 1990, although he requested for a retirement due to his health issue since 1989 from Narcís Serra the then Minister of Defence, Admiral Gonzalo Martín-Granizo replace him, he was a member of the Assembly of the Royal and Military Order of San Hermenegildo in 1994 until 1996.

He had also attended the inauguration of the President of Equatorial Guinea Teodoro Obiang, that was in 1989, although he is a good friend to Teodoro Obiang.

He is well known among the professionals with experienced in first-hand passage of the Spanish air force from fleeing of propeller supersonic reactors.

== Ranks ==
He was promoted to brigadier general of air force in 1979, to major general in 1982, and became lieutenant general of the Air in 1984. He was promoted to the rank of General of the Air in 1999 for an honorary character.

== Family ==
He was married to Pilar Campos del Fresno with whom they had eight children, one of his child Chalo Puigcerver still lives.

== Deaths ==
He died in Madrid, Spain when at the age of 87 on 14 February 2012.

== Citations ==
=== Works cited ===
- "BOE.es - BOE-A-1986-28974 Real Decreto 2299/1986, de 31 de octubre, por el que se nombra Jefe del Estado Mayor de la Defensa al Teniente General del Ejército del Aire don Gonzalo Puigcerver Roma". www.boe.es. (0)
- BOE " no. 263, of November 3, 1986, pages 36652 to 36652 (1 page )Section:II. Authorities and staff - Appointments, situations and incidentsDepartment:Presidency of the GovernmentReference:BOE-A-1986-28974 (1)
- Escudero, Antonio Morales (2017-03-14). "Gonzalo Puigcerver Romá. Aviador Militar y Jefe del Cuarto Militar de la Casa Real | Museo del Aire" (in Spanish). (2)
- lainformacion.com (2012-02-21). "Fallece el general Puigcerver, primer militar del Ejército Aire que fue JEMAD". La Información (in Spanish). (3)
- Junquera, Natalia (2012-02-22). "Gonzalo Puigcerver, primer aviador que mandó el Ejército". El País (in Spanish). ISSN 1134-6582. (4)
- "ABC MADRID 22-02-2012 página 61 - Archivo ABC". abc. 2012-02-22.
- Gillard, Juan (2012-03-02). "In memoriam de Gonzalo Puigcerver Romá". Información (in Spanish). (7)

Military offices
Preceded by Admiral General Ángel Liberal Lucini	Chief of the Defence Staff; 1986–1990	Succeeded by Admiral Gonzalo Rodríguez Martín-Granizo
