= Chief of the Defence Staff (Spain) =

Head of the Spanish Armed Forces

- Jefe del Estado Mayor de la Defensa
- Coat of Arms of the Defence Staff

- Flag of the Chief of the Defence Staff

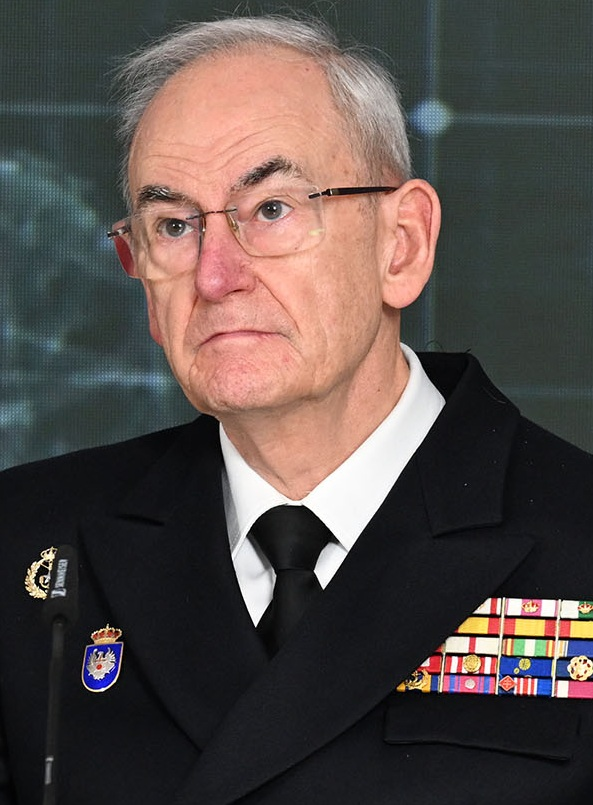
- Incumbent; Admiral general Teodoro Esteban López Calderón since 27 January 2021
- Ministry of Defence
- Style: The Most Excellent
- Type: Highest-ranking military officer
- Abbreviation: JEMAD
- Member of: Defence Staff; Council of State; National Security Council; National Defence Council; Council of Chiefs of Staff
- Reports to: Prime Minister; Minister of Defence
- Seat: Vitruvio Street, Madrid
- Nominator: Prime Minister; After being discussed in the Council of Ministers
- Appointer: The Monarch; Countersigned by the Prime Minister
- Constituting instrument: Basic Criteria of National Defence and Military Organization Act of 1984
- Precursor: Chairman of the Defence High Command (1939–1980); Chairman of the Board of Chiefs of Staff (1980–1984)
- Formation: 5 January 1984; 42 years ago
- First holder: Admiral general Ángel Liberal Lucini
- Salary: € 122,000 per year
- Website: (in Spanish) Website of the Defence Staff

The chief of the Defence Staff (Spanish: Jefe del Estado Mayor de la Defensa, JEMAD) is the highest-ranking military officer in the Spanish Armed Forces and is the principal military advisor to the prime minister, the minister of defence, the National Defence Council and the National Security Council. It is the fourth military authority of the country after the Monarch, the prime minister and the minister of defence because the secretary of state for defence and the under-secretary of defence do not have military authority.

The JEMAD has three different roles: the support role, assisting and advising the prime minister and the minister of defence in military affairs and supports the under secretary of defence in its duties over the military personnel; the strategic role, being the official in charge of design the military strategy, directs the military operations and the actions to guarantee cyberspace freedom (with the supervision of the minister), assign the military forces for the missions and give orders to the other chiefs of staff to appoint new commanders; and the preparatory role, coordinating the chiefs of staff and giving orders to them to prepare the troops, oversees the internal organization of the different branches, establish the common rules and regulations of the armed forces, ensures compliance with military discipline, staff motivation and their well-being and establish the organization of the Armed Forces (in coordination with the other chiefs of staff).

The chief of the Defence Staff convenes the meetings and coordinates the efforts of the Defence Staff (EMAD), an auxiliary body of command and support to the chief of Defence Staff comprising the chief of the Defence Staff, the chief of the Joint Defence Staff, the commander and deputy commander of the Operations Command, the Director of the Armed Forces Intelligence Center, the chief Commander of the Joint Cyberspace Command, the Director of the Higher Center for National Defence Studies, the Admiral of the Fleet, the chief general of the Air Combat Command of the Air Force and the chief of the Military Emergencies Unit.

Although in some legally established situations the chiefs of staff of the Army, Navy and Air Force advise the chief of the Defence Staff, they do not directly depend from the JEMAD but from the minister of defence.

== Organization and assistants ==
The chief of the Defence Staff has not a deputy chief of the Defence Staff, and when its unable to fulfill his functions, it is replaced by the most senior chief of staff of the Army, Navy or Air Force.

The JEMAD is assisted by the Joint Defence Staff, the main auxiliary body of the Defence Staff directed by the chief of the Joint Defence Staff, which at the same times is assisted by the secretary-general of the Joint Defence Staff. The JEMAD it is also assisted by a personal secretary and by the chief of economic affairs, the chief of human resources and the chief of security and services.

In matters of military strategy is advised by the commander of the Operations Command and in cyberdefence by the chief commander of the Joint Cyberspace Command. Directly from the JEMAD depends the Armed Forces Intelligence Center in charge of recollecting military information and advise the JEMAD, the chief of staff of the Army, the chief of staff of the Navy and the chief of staff of the Air Force in counter-intelligence and security.

Other bodies that also depend from the JEMAD are the Military Emergencies Unit, the Command of Maritime Security and Surveillance and the Command of Defence and Air Operations.

== History ==
The creation of the first Military Staff in Spain dates back to 1801 when on the occasion of the War of Spain and France against Portugal, an army was created under the command of Godoy, which included a special structure called the General Staff, also called the General Staff of the Armies in Operations.

On June 9, 1810 is constituted for the first time in Spain the Body of General Staff, separated completely from the other Armies branches, following their top officials different military careers. General Blake was its first chief. Once the War of Independence was over, by Royal Order of June 27, 1814, Ferdinand VII suppressed the General Staff Body. In 1820 it was created for the second time, but its existence was short, and in 1823 it disappeared again.

In 1837, experience had shown the ineffectiveness of all the decisions that had been taken to replace the Body of General Staff and the General Staff was again established for the proper functioning of the Army. Its new organization was approved on January 1, 1838 and in front of it was a director-general.

In 1904, the Central Staff of the Army (EMCE) appeared, which was suppressed in 1912 and returned to the previous organization, the General Staff Body; the EMCE was re-created in 1916 and abolished in 1925. During the Second Republic the Body of General Staff was finally suppressed and the EMCE was re-created.

After the Civil War, on August 31, 1939, the High Command was created, the true predecessor of the current Defence Staff, with Brigadier General Juan Vigón in front as chief of the General Staff. The High Command was active throughout Francoist Spain and part of the Spanish transition to democracy, disappearing on June 13, 1980.

Three years earlier, in 1977, the Joint Chiefs of Staff had been created as the principal body of the General Staff to advise the prime minister and the minister of defence and whose chairman was also the chief of the General Staff. This body assumed all the functions of the EMP when it was suppressed.

In 1984, the Joint Chiefs of Staff was institutionalized and the position of Chief of the Defence Staff (JEMAD) was created, replacing the chairman of the Board of Chiefs of Staff. At the same time, the Defence Staff was created to support the JEMAD. The Joint Chiefs of Staff was in force until 2005, when the new National Defence Organic Act created the National Defence Council as an advisory body to the prime minister and the minister of defence.

== List of chiefs of the Defence Staff ==
No.	Portrait	Name (born–died)	Term of office			Defence branch	Government	Monarch(s)	Ref.
No.	Portrait	Name (born–died)	Took office	Left office	Time in office	Defence branch	Government	Monarch(s)	Ref.
1		Admiral; Ángel Liberal Lucini (1921–2006)	11 January 1984	31 October 1986	2 years, 293 days	Navy	Felipe González	Juan Carlos I (1975–2014)	
2		Lieutenant General; Gonzalo Puigcerver Romá (1924–2012)	31 October 1986	18 May 1990	3 years, 199 days	Air Force	Felipe González	Juan Carlos I (1975–2014)	
3		Admiral; Gonzalo Rodríguez Martín-Granizo (1928–1992)	18 May 1990	16 December 1992 #	2 years, 212 days	Navy	Felipe González	Juan Carlos I (1975–2014)	
4		Lieutenant General; José Rodrigo Rodrigo (1928–2016)	23 December 1992	26 July 1996	3 years, 223 days	Army	Felipe González	Juan Carlos I (1975–2014)	
5		General of the Air; Santiago Valderas Cañestro (1933–2019)	26 July 1996	15 December 2000	4 years, 142 days	Air Force	José María Aznar	Juan Carlos I (1975–2014)	
6		Admiral General; Antonio Moreno Barberá (1940–2023)	15 December 2000	25 June 2004	3 years, 193 days	Navy	José María Aznar	Juan Carlos I (1975–2014)	
7		General of the Army; Félix Sanz Roldán (born 1945)	25 June 2004	18 July 2008	4 years, 23 days	Army	José Luis Rodríguez Zapatero	Juan Carlos I (1975–2014)	
8		General of the Air; José Julio Rodríguez Fernández (born 1948)	18 July 2008	30 December 2011	3 years, 165 days	Air Force	José Luis Rodríguez Zapatero	Juan Carlos I (1975–2014)	
9		Admiral General; Fernando García Sánchez (born 1953)	30 December 2011	24 March 2017	5 years, 84 days	Navy	Mariano Rajoy	Juan Carlos I (1975–2014)	
9		Admiral General; Fernando García Sánchez (born 1953)	30 December 2011	24 March 2017	5 years, 84 days	Navy	Mariano Rajoy	Felipe VI (2014–present)	
10		General of the Army; Fernando Alejandre Martínez (born 1956)	24 March 2017	15 January 2020	2 years, 297 days	Army	Mariano Rajoy	Felipe VI (2014–present)	
10		General of the Army; Fernando Alejandre Martínez (born 1956)	24 March 2017	15 January 2020	2 years, 297 days	Army	Pedro Sánchez	Felipe VI (2014–present)	
11		General of the Air; Miguel Ángel Villarroya (born 1957)	15 January 2020	27 January 2021	1 year, 12 days	Air Force	Pedro Sánchez	Felipe VI (2014–present)	
12		Admiral General; Teodoro Esteban López Calderón (born 1954)	27 January 2021	Incumbent	5 years, 223 days	Navy	Pedro Sánchez	Felipe VI (2014–present)	

== See also ==
- Chief of Staff of the Army (Spain)
- Chief of Staff of the Navy (Spain)
- Chief of Staff of the Air and Space Force (Spain)
- Ministers of Defence
- Captain general of the Army
- Captain general of the Navy
- Captain general of the Air Force
- Spanish Armed Forces
