= Antonio Moreno (disambiguation) =

Antonio Moreno (1887–1967) was a Spanish-American actor.

Antonio Moreno may also refer to:

- Antonio Moreno Barberá (1940–2023), Spanish admiral general
- Antonio Moreno Casamitjana (1927–2013), Chilean archbishop
- Antônio Carlos Moreno (born 1948), Brazilian volleyball player
- Antonio Moreno (defender) (born 1983), Spanish football fullback
- Antonio Moreno (forward) (born 1983), Spanish football forward

== See also ==
- Antonia Moreno Leyva (1848–1916), Peruvian first lady
- Luis Antonio Moreno (born 1970), Colombian footballer
- Toñi Moreno (born 1973), Spanish television journalist
