= Antonio Moreno Barberá =

Spanish naval officer (1940–2023)

Admiral Antonio Moreno Barberá

Chief of the Defence Staff
- In office 15 December 2000 – 25 June 2004
- Monarch: Juan Carlos I
- Prime Minister: José María Aznar; José Luis Rodríguez Zapatero
- Preceded by: Santiago Valderas Cañestro
- Succeeded by: Félix Sanz Roldán

Chief of Staff of the Navy
- In office 27 June 1997 – 15 December 2000
- Monarch: Juan Carlos I
- Prime Minister: José María Aznar
- Preceded by: Juan José Romero Caramelo
- Succeeded by: Francisco José Torrente Sánchez

Personal details
- Born: Antonio Moreno Barberá; 17 April 1940 Madrid, Spanish State
- Died: 14 April 2023 (aged 82) Madrid, Spain

Military service
- Branch/service: Spanish Navy
- Years of service: 1956–2004
- Rank: Admiral general

Antonio Moreno Barberá (17 April 1940 – 14 April 2023) was a Spanish admiral general, who served as Chief of the Defence Staff (Jefe del Estado Mayor de la Defensa, JEMAD) between 2000 and 2004 and as Chief of Staff of the Navy (Jefe de Estado Mayor de la Armada, JEMA) between 1997 and 2000. The offices he held made him chief of staff of the Spanish Armed Forces and the Spanish Navy, respectively.

== Biography ==
=== Military career ===
Moreno joined the Spanish Navy at the age of sixteen. In 1995 he was appointed commander of Naval Station Rota, and in 1997 he was promoted to admiral. On 27 June 1997, he was appointed Chief of Staff of the Navy.

=== Chief of the Defence Staff (2000–2004) ===
On 15 December 2000 he was appointed Chief of the Defence Staff, taking office on 19 December. During his term, the Armed Forces Intelligence Center was promoted, responsible for preparing and disseminating all the intelligence needed for the actions of the Armed Forces, being complementary to the CESID.

In July 2002, the Moroccan occupation of Perejil Island took place. Then Prime Minister of Spain José María Aznar recounted that the Chief of the Defence Staff advised him three times against military action, but he nevertheless decided to proceed.

To address this situation, the Armed Forces command adopted a series of preventative measures in anticipation of a potential escalation of hostile acts by Morocco. As specific measures, half a dozen frigates, corvettes, and submarines were deployed from the naval bases of Rota (Cádiz) and Cartagena (Murcia) to patrol the waters near Ceuta and Melilla. Several Chinook transport and Bölkow attack helicopters from the Army Airmobile Force (FAMET) also departed from air bases in southern Spain for the two North African cities. The military deployment was completed with the dispatch of P-3 Orion maritime patrol aircraft from Morón Air Base (Seville). Other units of the Rapid Action Force (FAR) and the Fleet were on alert.

On 26 May 2003, the Yak-42 crash occurred near the Turkish city of Trabzon, killing 62 Spanish military personnel, along with twelve Ukrainian crew members and one Belarusian citizen. More than half of the bodies of the military personnel killed in the crash that underwent DNA analysis were misidentified, according to a report by the Istanbul Institute of Toxicology, which compared samples from 39 families with the remains of as many victims. The presiding judge of the third central court of the National Court, Fernando Grande-Marlaska, dismissed the case against the military leadership.

On 19 April 2004, after the PSOE won the general election, Prime Minister José Luis Rodríguez Zapatero ordered the withdrawal of Spanish troops from Iraq. Once the withdrawal was completed, Moreno was relieved of his command.

Military offices
Preceded by Santiago Valderas Cañestro	Chief of the Defence Staff; 15 December 2000 – 25 June 2004	Succeeded by Félix Sanz Roldán
Preceded by Juan José Romero Caramelo	Chief of Staff of the Navy; 27 June 1997 – 15 December 2000	Succeeded by Francisco José Torrente Sánchez
