= Manuel Mestre Barea =

Spanish military officer and politician (born 1950)

Manuel Mestre Barea MP

Member of the Congress of Deputies
- Incumbent
- Assumed office 21 May 2019
- Constituency: Alicante

Personal details
- Born: 3 January 1952 (age 74)
- Party: Vox
- Education: Air University
- Military career
- Allegiance: Spain
- Branch: Spanish Air and Space Force
- Service years: 1992-2015
- Rank: Lieutenant General
- Unit: Canary Islands Air Command

Manuel Mestre Barea (born January 3, 1950) is a former Spanish military officer who served as Chief of the Canary Islands Air Command and politician who is a member of the Congress of Deputies for the Vox party.

== Military career ==
Mestre Barea began his career at the Basic Air Academy in León. He was attached to the NATO Joint Force Command (JFCLB) in Lisbon. He reached the rank of Deputy Commander of the JFCLB in 2010 and took a leading role in Operation Ocean Shield, in conjunction with Operation Atalanta, to combat piracy around the Horn of Africa. During his military career, Barea was also head of education and academic studies at the Spanish Ministry of Defence. In 2008, he was appointed Chief of the Canary Islands Air Command and from 2013 to 2015 was head of the personal command to the Chief of Staff of the Air Force.

Mestre Barea also holds a master's degree in international relations which he completed at Air University in the United States.

== Political career ==
In 2019, Mestre Barea was announced as a candidate for the Vox party ahead of the April general election. During the election, he was elected as a deputy for the Alicante constituency in the Congress of Deputies. He was re-elected in the November 2019 election.
