= General Sanchez =

General Sanchez may refer to:

- Ricardo Sanchez (born 1953), U.S. Army lieutenant general
- Fernando García Sánchez (born 1953), Spanish Navy admiral general
- Otilio Montaño Sánchez (1887–1917), Zapatista general in the Mexican Revolution

== See also ==
- Antonio Barroso Sánchez-Guerra (1893–1982), Spanish Army general
