= José Rodrigo Rodrigo =

Spanish military officer (1928–2016)

General José Rodrigo Rodrigo
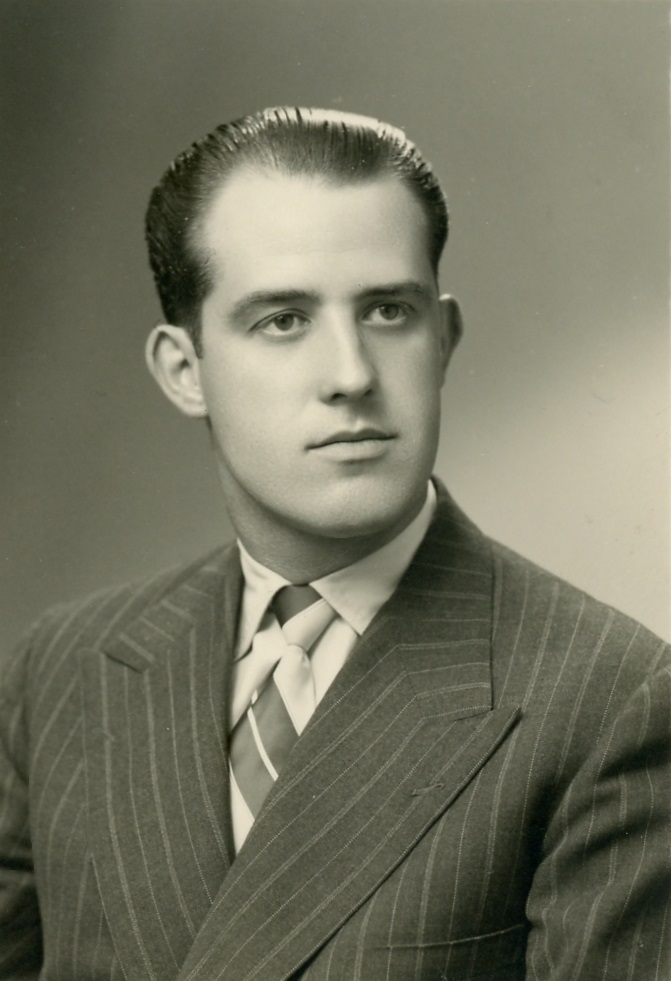
- Rodrigo in 1955

Chief of the Defence Staff
- In office 23 December 1992 – 26 July 1996
- Monarch: Juan Carlos I
- Prime Minister: Felipe González; José María Aznar
- Preceded by: Gonzalo Rodríguez Martín-Granizo
- Succeeded by: Santiago Valderas Cañestro

Personal details
- Born: José Rodrigo Rodrigo; 26 December 1928 Ceuta, Kingdom of Spain
- Died: 21 October 2016 (aged 87) Spain
- Education: General Military Academy

Military service
- Branch/service: Spanish Army
- Years of service: 1943–1996
- Rank: Lieutenant general

José Rodrigo Rodrigo (26 December 1928 – 21 October 2016) was a Spanish military officer who served as Chief of the Defence Staff (Jefe del Estado Mayor de la Defensa, JEMAD) between 1992 and 1996. The office he held made him chief of staff of the Spanish Armed Forces.

== Biography ==
A native of Ceuta, Rodrigo joined the Spanish Army in the infantry in 1943 as a volunteer. Four years later, he entered the General Military Academy, where in 1951 he was commissioned as a lieutenant in the infantry, graduating first in his class. As a lieutenant, he was assigned to the Infantry Regiment "Flandes" No. 30, from where he transferred to the Alcázar de Toledo Armored Cavalry Regiment and shortly thereafter to the General Staff College. He was a pioneer among Spanish officers and military leaders in attending training courses abroad. In 1978, as a lieutenant colonel, he commanded a battalion of the Infantry Regiment "Asturias" No. 31, garrisoned in El Goloso (Madrid).

During his military career, he served in command of units and in positions of responsibility and leadership within the Ministry of Defence. He attained the rank of general in 1982. He then completed staff training courses in the United States and held various officer and command positions, including deputy military attaché at the Spanish Embassy in Argentina, at the General Staff College, as Secretary of the Spanish Commission of Peninsular Staffs, and successively as commander of the Light Infantry Regiment "Isabel la Católica" No. 29. Following administrative assignments, as a colonel he was deputy director of Defense Policy for International Defense Affairs at DIGENPOL (General Directorate of Defense Policy). He maintained his post when he reached the rank of brigadier general and, in 1987, as a major general, he was appointed commanding general of the Armoured Division No. 1 "Brunete".

A year later, in 1988, he joined the Army General Staff, where he rose to the rank of Deputy Chief. He was promoted to lieutenant general in 1989, becoming the head of a captaincy general upon assuming command of the I Military Region (Madrid), before the reform that eliminated the military regions. In December 1992, about to retire, he replaced Admiral Gonzalo Rodríguez Martín-Granizo as Chief of the Defence Staff (JEMAD)—who had died in office from a stroke—appointed by the third government of Prime Minister Felipe González. He stepped down as Chief of the Defence Staff in the summer of 1996, after the first government of Prime Minister José María Aznar had already been formed, and was replaced by Lieutenant General Santiago Valderas Cañestro.

He was a member of the Royal and Military Order of Saint Ferdinand, which he presided over, and Grand Chancellor Royal and Military Order of Saint Hermenegild. He was a member of the Council of State as an ex officio member upon leaving the post of Chief of the Defence Staff. He also received the Cross of Military Merit, the Cross of Aeronautical Merit and the Cross of Naval Merit, all with white distinction. He was promoted to the honorary title of General of the Army in 1999 and was, at the time of his death, the Spanish military officer with the most years of service in the armed forces.

Military offices
Preceded by Gonzalo Rodríguez Martín-Granizo	Chief of the Defence Staff; 23 December 1992 – 26 July 1996	Succeeded by Santiago Valderas Cañestro
