= Ángel Liberal Lucini =

Spanish military officer (1921–2006)

Chief of Defence
- In office 11 January 1984 – 31 October 1986
- Monarch: Juan Carlos I
- Prime Minister: Felipe González
- Minister: Narcís Serra (as Defence minister)
- Succeeded by: Air Lieutenant General Gonzalo Puigcerver Romá

Personal details
- Born: 19 September 1921 Barcelona, Catalonia, Spain
- Died: 2 October 2006 (aged 85) Ruber Clinic, Madrid, Spain

Military service
- Allegiance: Spain
- Branch/service: Spanish Navy
- Years of service: 1938– 1986
- Rank: Admiral General (1999)
- Unit: JEMAD
- Commands: Chief of Defence Staff

Ángel Liberal Lucini (19 September 1921 – 2 October 2006) was a soldier and admiral in the Spanish Military, who became the first Chief of the Defence Staff (JEMAD) upon its creation, serving from January 1984 to October 1986.

Lucini was born on 19 September 1921 in Barcelona. His father, an infantry commander and vice-captain general of Valladolid in 1936, was the first victim of the Spanish Civil War.

Lucini enrolled in the Naval Academy in Cádiz in 1938 at the age of 16–17 and graduated in 1942. At 23, he commanded his first ships, the torpedo boat LT 25 in 1945, Arcila in 1949, and Alcalá Galiano in 1962. Lucini did not participate in the Civil War during his service in the Spanish Navy. As a rear admiral in 1976, he commanded 17 ships in the Bodyguard Command, and it was reported that he never arrested anyone during his command.

Lucini earned a diploma in naval warfare at the Naval War College, where he later served as deputy director, head of studies, and instructor at the Military Naval School. In 1961, he was the naval attaché at the Spanish Embassy in the United States.

== Post-military ==
Lucini held various political and military posts throughout his career. He became the first Secretary General of the Navy when the Ministry of Defence was established in 1977, playing a key role in preventing the 23-F attempted coup. He also served as Secretary General for Defence Economic Affairs and was appointed Undersecretary of Defence on 23 February 1981. Additionally, he was chief of cabinet for Admiral Nieto Antúnez for four years and was among those who helped oversee the creation of the Department of Defence. In 1996, Lucini became a member of the Council of State.

Lucini also participated in the Spanish-North American negotiations leading to the Friendship and Cooperation Agreement, where his involvement was considered highly distinguished. (Note: Gutiérrez Mellado's book Soldado de España describes Liberal's role in the Spanish-North American negotiations as particularly brilliant.)

== Ranks and commands ==
Lucini became a rear admiral in 1974 and served as head and vice admiral in 1977, rising to the rank of admiral in 1982. He was appointed captain general of the Mediterranean maritime zone in January 1983, a position he held until January 1984, when he became the first Chief of the Defence Staff (JEMAD). During his tenure, he worked closely with Lieutenant General Manuel Gutiérrez Mellado as Spain joined NATO. He represented the Spanish military at the NATO Military Committee and served as its president for one year between 1984 and 1985, contributing to discussions on the Gibraltar dispute, which were later prepared by the Institute for International Issues and Foreign Policy and featured in a forum in 1997.

Lucini retired from active service after completing his tenure as JEMAD in October 1986. He was succeeded by Lieutenant General Gonzalo Puigcerver of the air force. In 1999, Lucini received an honorary promotion to admiral general.

== Family members ==
His father, Ángel Liberal Travieso, was the aide-de-camp to the Captain General of Valladolid, General Nicolás Molero Lobo. In 1936, during the Spanish Civil War, Travieso was fatally wounded while attempting to resist rebellious troops assaulting the Captaincy building in Villacastín. He became the first casualty of the war, killed by Commander Riobóo. (Note: historical data by LM de Dios from Valladolid)

Lucini's mother, Ana María Fernández Núñez-Mota, was the daughter of Admiral and Captain General of the Cantabrian Pedro Fernández Martín. She had three brothers who also served in the Navy. Lucini had three siblings: María Gloria, Eduardo, who was a lieutenant in the Navy and commanded the destroyer Marqués de la Ensenada, and María Concepción.

== Death ==
Lucini died on 2 October 2006 at the age of 85.

== Decorations ==
Military decorations
Grand Cross of the Royal and Military Order of San Hermenegildo
Grand Cross of Aeronautical Merit
Royal and Military Order of Saint Hermenegild (Insignia, Knight Commander and Cross)
Cross of Aeronautical Merit
Grand Cross of the Order of Carlos III
Grand Cross of the North American Legion of Merit in Command
Grand Cross of Isabel la Católica
Medal of the Order of Constitutional Merit
Grand Cross of Civil Merit
Grand Cross of Naval Merit
NATO Meritorious Service Medal

== Notes ==
Military offices
Preceded by Newly created	Chief of the Defence Staff; January 1984– October 1986	Succeeded by Air Lieutenant General Gonzalo Puigcerver
