= Chief of Staff of the Air and Space Force (Spain) =

- Emblem of the Office of the JEMAE

- Flag of the Chief of Staff of the Air and Space Force

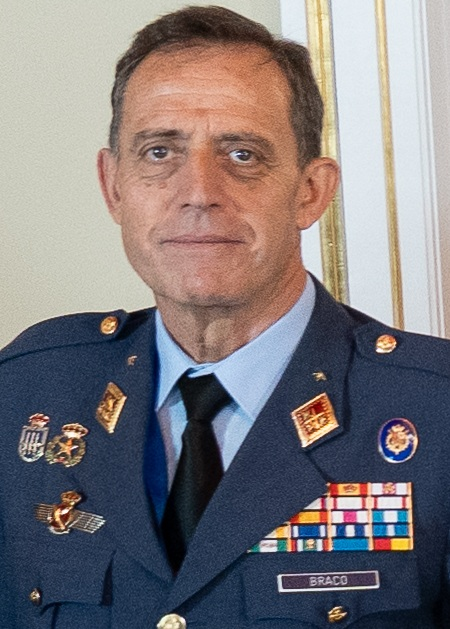
- Incumbent; General of the Air; Francisco Braco Carbó since 23 July 2024
- Air Staff; Ministry of Defence
- Style: The Most Excellent
- Status: Highest-ranking officer in the Air and Space Force
- Abbreviation: JEMAE
- Member of: Air Staff; National Defence Council; Council of Chiefs of Staff
- Reports to: Minister of Defence
- Seat: Air and Space Force Military Headquarters, Madrid
- Nominator: Defence Minister; After being discussed in the Council of Ministers
- Appointer: Monarch; Countersigned by the Defence Minister
- Term length: No fixed term
- Constituting instrument: Air Force Act of 1939
- Inaugural holder: Alfredo Kindelán, 1st Marquess of Kindelán
- Formation: July 29, 1936; 90 years ago
- Deputy: Second Chief of Staff of the Air and Space Force
- Website: (in Spanish) Website of the Spanish Air and Space Force Staff

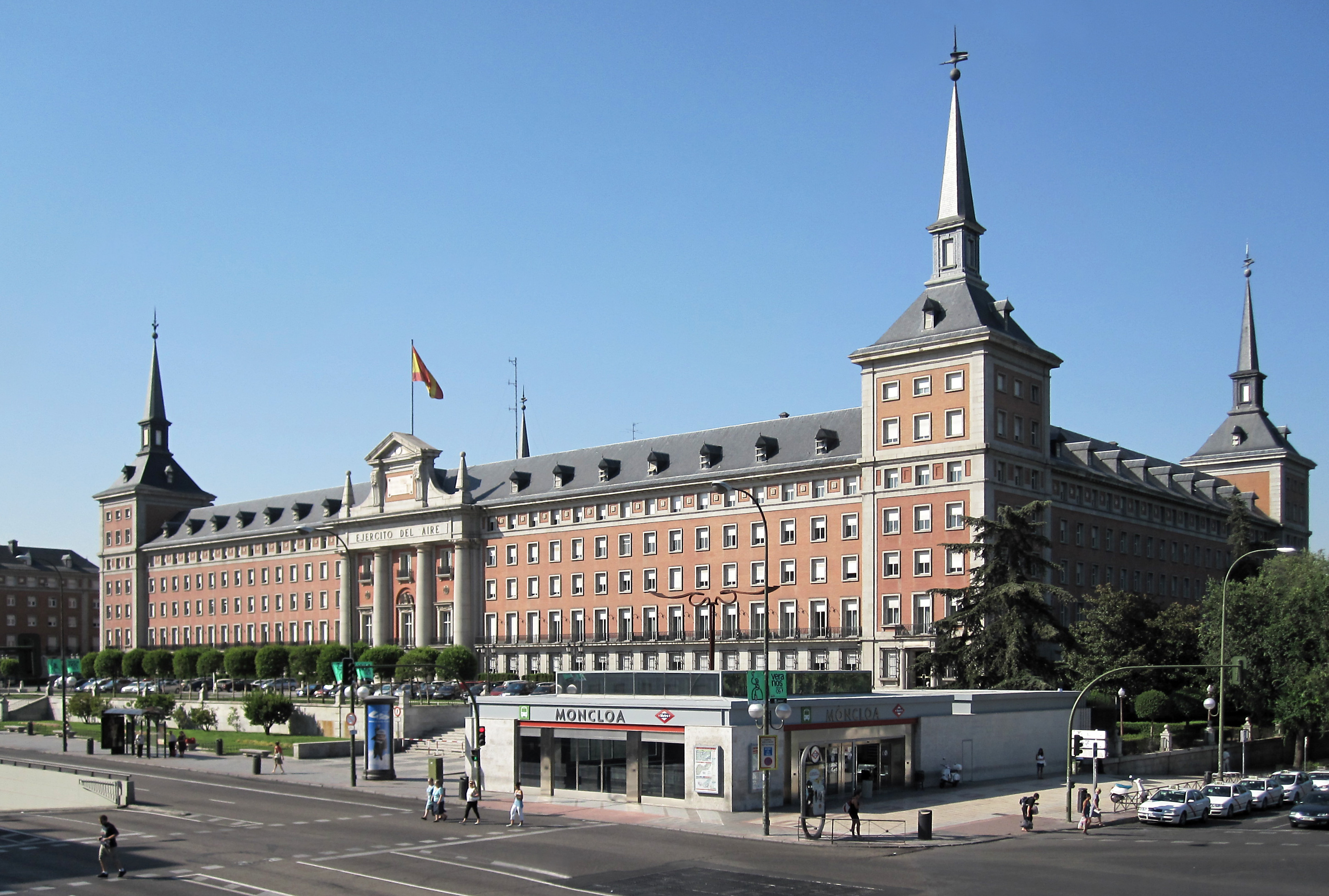
Air and Space Force Military Headquarters

The Chief of Staff of the Air and Space Force (JEMAE) is a four-star general that under the authority of the defence minister exercises command over the Spanish Air and Space Force, and as such is the principal military advisor to the Chief of the Defence Staff, the Minister of Defence, the Secretary of State for Defence and the Under Secretary of Defence. It's also a member of the Council of Chiefs of Staff and a military advisor to the National Defence Council.

The JEMAE has two main roles: the support role by which advice the Minister of Defence about the Air and Space Force military policy, the JEMAD about how to use the personnel and their operative status, the SEDEF about the economic, armamentistic and infrastructure policies and the Under Secretary about the personnel and teaching policy; and the operative role by which prepare the force for combat, instructs the military personnel, establishes the organization of its military branch and watches over the welfare of the personnel under his command and evaluates the needs of the Air and Space Force.

The Chief of the Air and Space Force convenes the meetings and coordinates the efforts of the Air Staff (EMA), the main support body of the JEMAE, responsible for providing the necessary elements of judgment to base its decisions, translate these into orders and ensure their fulfillment. The EMA has a whole body of military officers at its service, and among the main officers are include the Second Chief of Staff of the Air and Space Force (SEJEMAE), the Permanent Secretary of the Superior Council of the Air and Space Force, the Chief General of the Secretariat General of the Air and Space Staff (SEGE), the Chief General of Technical Services and Information Systems and Telecommunications and its Chef de Cabinet.

The position is currently held by General of the Air Francisco Braco Carbó since 23 July 2024.

== History ==
The position of Chief of Staff was created on 29 July 1936, when the then-chairman of the National Defence Board, general Miguel Cabanellas, appointed Alfredo Kindelán as Chief of the Air Services. Later, by decree no. 52 of 18 August 1936, which reorganized the National Air Forces in the Nationalist side, ratified the position as the highest in the air services, and an Air Staff was established to assist him.

With the creation of the Ministry of the Air and the Air Force in 1939, the chief of staff remained as head of the air branch. According to the Air Force Act of that year, the Head of State was the commander-in-chief of the Air Force, and he delegated it to the air minister, who in turn delegated it to the chief of staff. The intention behind this ministry was to give the air branch (which had been so important in winning the Civil War) the same level as the Army or the Navy.

The Air Staff was made up of the Chief of Staff of the Air Force, the Second Chief of Staff of the Air Force, a private secretariat for the JEMA and a general one for the Air and Space Staff, and 5 sections: Organization, instruction and mobilization; Information; Operations; Services and Cartography.

At that time, the JEMA exercised its powers over all the aerial resources of the Armed Forces, both those of the Air Force and the aerial means of the Army and the Navy, but always coordinating with the other Chiefs of Staff, although in practice the commanders of the air forces of the Army and of the Navy were of those respective branches, reason why the influence of the JEMA was null. The JEMA was part, together with the Under Secretary of Air and other ministerial officials, of the Administrative Technical Board, permanent advisory body of the Armed Forces Command on the election of prototypes of aircraft and engines, contracts, infrastructure programs, acquisitions, etc., and of the High Command (AEM) (that acted as a simple coordinating body).

The JEMA depended on the Ministry of the Air until the disappearance of this in 1977. Since then, the JEMA has depended on the Ministry of Defence.

== List of officeholders ==
No.	Rank	Name	Appointed	Dismissed
1º	Brigadier general	The Marquess of Kindelán	29 July 1936	12 August 1939
2º	Colonel	Luis Moreno Abella	12 August 1939	27 April 1940
3º	Brigadier general	Eduardo González-Gallarza Iragorri	27 April 1940	20 July 1945
4º	Brigadier general	Francisco Fernández-Longoria González	26 July 1945	6 June 1958
5º	Lieutenant general	Eugenio de Frutos Dieste	6 June 1958	21 September 1960
6º	Lieutenant general	Enrique Palacios y Ruiz de Almodóvar	21 September 1960	5 September 1962
7º	Lieutenant general	Manuel Martínez Merino	20 September 1962	31 May 1965
8º	Lieutenant general	Luis Navarro Garnica	31 May 1965	21 March 1970
9º	Lieutenant general	Enrique Jiménez Benamú	31 March 1970	6 April 1972
10º	Lieutenant general	Mariano Cuadra Medina	7 April 1972	11 January 1974
11º	Lieutenant general	Ramiro Pascual Sanz	11 January 1974	5 March 1976
12º	Lieutenant general (*)	Felipe Galarza Sánchez	23 March 1976	12 September 1978
13º	Lieutenant general (**)	Ignacio Alfaro Arregui	23 July 1977	12 September 1978
14º	Lieutenant general (**)	Emiliano Alfaro Arregui	30 September 1978	15 January 1982
15º	Lieutenant general (**)	Emilio García-Conde Ceñal	15 January 1982	11 January 1984
16º	Lieutenant general (**)	José Santos Peralba Giráldez	11 January 1984	31 October 1986
17º	Lieutenant general (**)	Federico Michavila Pallarés	31 October 1986	23 May 1990
18º	Lieutenant general (**)	Ramón Fernández Sequeiros	23 May 1990	14 February 1994
19º	Lieutenant general (***)	Ignacio Manuel Quintana Arévalo	14 February 1994	10 January 1997
20º	General of the Air	Juan Antonio Lombo López	10 January 1997	20 April 2001
21º	General of the Air	Eduardo González-Gallarza Morales	20 April 2001	26 June 2004
22º	General of the Air	Francisco José García de la Vega	26 June 2004	18 July 2008
23º	General of the Air	José Jiménez Ruiz	18 July 2008	27 July 2012
24º	General of the Air	Francisco Javier García Arnáiz	28 July 2012	31 March 2017
25º	General of the Air	Javier Salto Martínez-Avial	31 March 2017	23 July 2024
26º	General of the Air	Francisco Braco Carbó	23 July 2024	Incumbent

(*) Promoted posthumously to General of the Air in 1999.
(**) Promoted to General of the Air ad honorem in 1999.
(***) Promoted to General of the Air while in office.

== See also ==
- Chief of the Defence Staff
- Ministers of Defence
- Captain general of the Air Force
- Spanish Air and Space Force
- Chief of Staff of the Navy
- Chief of Staff of the Army
