= Kindelán =

Kindelan (Irish: Ó Caoindealbháin, lit. 'descendant of Caoindealbhán') is a surname of Irish origin that has been adopted into Spanish.

Up to the mid-18th century it was common for Irish citizens to enroll in the Irish Brigades of Spain or France, individuals being known as "wild geese"; this was especially so after the Treaty of Limerick which ended the Williamite War.

About 1700 (date uncertain), Michael Kindelan (born 1674 in Ballinakill–died 1720) married Cecelia Lutrell of Luttrellstown near Dublin; their son Vincent was born at Castle Ricard, County Meath in 1710.

Vincent (Vicente) became one of these wild geese and fathered both Sebastian and Juan in the 1750s in Spain. He married Maria Francisca O'Regan y MacManus, daughter of Mauricio O'Regan and Rosa MacManus, on 15 Apr 1741 in Fraga. Vincent is credited as the forebear of all the Spanish Kindeláns, and of many in the Americas.

== People ==
- Alfredo Kindelán (1879–1962), Spanish general and politician
- Jean de Kindelán (1759–1822), Spanish army officer in service of Napoleon
- José Manuel Kindelán (1887–1919), Spanish footballer and referee
- Mario Kindelán (born 1971), Cuban boxer
- Orestes Kindelán (born 1964), Cuban baseball player
- Sebastián Kindelán y O’Regan (1757–1826), Spanish colonial Governor of East Florida, Dominican Republic and Cuba
