= Fernando García Sánchez =

Spanish naval general

Fernando Garcia Sánchez
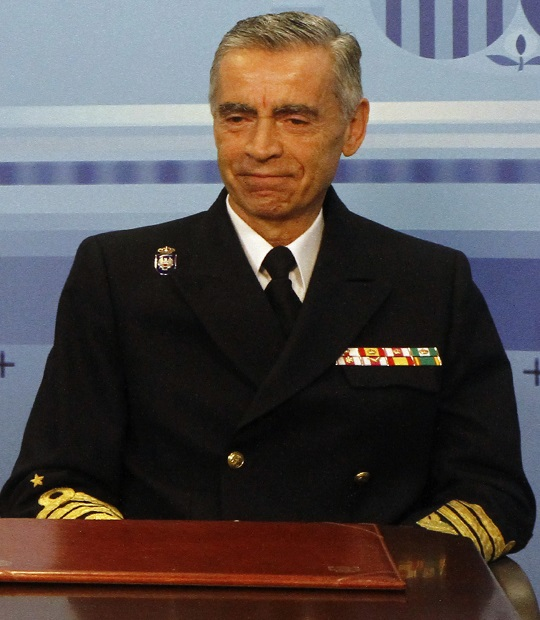
- Image of CDS 2016

Chief of the Defence Staff
- In office 30 December 2011 – 24 March 2017
- Monarch: Felipe VI
- Prime Minister: Mariano Rajoy
- Preceded by: air general José Julio Rodríguez Fernández
- Succeeded by: army general Fernando Alejandre Martínez

Personal details
- Born: Fernando Garcia Sánchez; September 25, 1953 (age 73) Granada, Spain.
- Spouse: Jesús Tobío Cendón
- Education: Escuela Naval Militar

Military service
- Allegiance: Spain
- Branch/service: Spanish Navy
- Years of service: 1971—2017
- Rank: Admiral General
- Commands: NATO 44.1 Naval group; Cataluña (F73); 2nd Minesweeper Squadron; 41st Escort Squadron; Naval Action Group 2; Chief of the Defence Staff
- Battles/wars: Operation Active Endeavor
- Awards: National Merit Badge Award

Fernando Garcia Sánchez (born September 25, 1953) is a retired Fleet Admiral and the Chief of Defence Staff of the Spanish Armed Forces, he took the office from December 2011 to March 24, 2017, he also chaired the Fundación Iberdrola España since 2018.

Fernando Garcia was born on September 25, 1953, in Granada, Spain. He joined the Spanish Naval Academy in 1971, after he graduated, he was commissioned to Lieutenant Junior Grade in 1976 and served in different battleships spending 2000 days in the sea. He also attended the Naval Warfare College for a diploma course.

Garcia Sánchez as a senior military officer, lectured in the Naval Warfare College and also in the Spanish Joint Staff College and was head of the Strategic Planning section of the Navy Planning division in 2003. He had also commanded the NATO 44.1 tactical operations Naval group peace missions in the Mediterranean twice, in 2000 and in 2001.

He was promoted Rear Admiral in 2005 and Vice Admiral in 2008. He became the Chief of Staff of Defence on the December 30, 2011 after he was promoted to Admiral, prior to that, he was the Chief of Staff of the Maritime Task Force, and deputy Chief of Naval Staff. Fernando Garcia speaks English and French fluently.

He is married to Jesús Tobío Cendón with three children.

== Decorations and badge ==
Spain

- Grand Cross of Naval Merit
- Grand Cross of the Order of Merit of the Civil Guard
- Grand Cross of the Royal and Military Order of San Hermenegildo
- Commander with Star of the Royal and Military Order of San Hermenegildo
- Commander of the Royal and Military Order of San Hermenegildo
- Cross of the Royal and Military Order of San Hermenegildo
- Cross of Military Merit
- Cross of Naval Merit
- Cross of the Order Guard Merit of the Civil Guard
- Cross of the Order Police Merit

France

- Chevalier of the Order of National Merit of the French Republic

NATO

- NATO Meritorious Service Medal
- Article 5 Medal for Operation Active Endeavor

Military offices
Preceded by José Julio Rodríguez Fernández	Chief of the Defence Staff; December 2011 – 24 March 2017	Succeeded by Fernando Alejandre Martínez
