= José Julio Rodríguez Fernández =

Spanish Air Force general

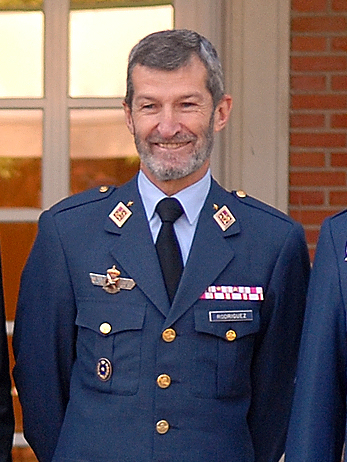
- Born: José Julio Rodríguez Fernández; June 8, 1948 (age 78); Ourense, Spain
- Military career
- Allegiance: Spain
- Branch: Spanish Air Force
- Service years: 1969–2012
- Rank: General of the Air
- Commands: Chief of the Defence Staff

José Julio Rodríguez Fernández (born June 8, 1948) is a Spanish Air Force general who was the Chief of the Defence Staff from 2008 until 2012. He transferred to the reserve with administrative effects of 31 December 2011.

On 18 July 2008, Rodríguez Fernández was appointed the Chief of the Defence Staff of the Spanish Armed Forces, replacing Felix Sanz Roldán. Rodríguez Fernández retired as Chief of the Defence Staff on Monday 2 January 2012, to be succeeded by General Admiral Fernando García Sánchez, the former Vice-Chief of the Naval Staff.

== Career ==
He has served as a fighter pilot and has also flown transport aircraft, he later studied management and has graduated from Air Staff training in Spain, the United States and Britain.

He was initially assigned first to the 21 Wing base in Morón de la Frontera. After his promotion to captain, transferred to 11 Wing at Manises. Since 1982 he has been assigned to Logistics Support Command and the Development Programme for European fighter aircraft Eurofighter Typhoon in Munich. He became Head of Logistic Command after three years (1991–1994) in the unit of the F-18 Wing 31 in Zaragoza.

In 2000 was elevated to the rank of brigadier general, occupying the post of Head of Planning Division of Staff and also president of Project Refuelling in NATO. After promotion to major general became responsible for administrative aspects of the Spanish Strategic Plan for Telecommunications and Information Systems and Director General of Armament and Equipment of the Spanish Ministry of Defence.

On 31 December 2011 he was transferred to the reserve, pending his retirement.

He holds, among other awards, the Grand Cross of the Royal and Military Order of San Hermenegildo and the Grand Cross of Aeronautical Merit.

From 2020 to 2021, he served as the chief of staff to the Second Deputy Prime Minister and Minister for Social Rights and 2030 Agenda Pablo Iglesias.

== Decorations and badges ==
Spanish military decorations
Grand Cross of the Royal and Military Order of San Hermenegild
Grand Cross of Aeronautical Merit
Royal and Military Order of Saint Hermenegild (Insignia, Knight Commander and Cross)
Cross of Aeronautical Merit (x3)

Military offices
Preceded by Félix Sanz Roldán	Chief of the Defence Staff; 18 July 2008 – 30 December 2011	Succeeded by Fernando García Sánchez
