= Santiago Valderas Cañestro =

Spanish military personnel

- Born: March 26, 1933; Larache, Spanish Protectorate of Morocco
- Died: January 19, 2019 (aged 85) Alcalá de Henares, Spain
- Branch: Spanish Air and Space Force
- Service years: since 1957
- Rank: General of the Air (since 1999)
- Commands: Chief of the Defence Staff (1996-2000)
- Alma mater: Academia General del Aire y del Espacio (1957)

Santiago Valderas Cañestro (26 March 1933, Larache, Spanish Protectorate of Morocco – 12 January 2019, Alcalá de Henares, Community of Madrid, Spain) was a Spanish military officer, Chief of Defence Staff from 1996 to 2000.

== Biography ==
=== Military career ===
In 1957, he graduated as a lieutenant from the General Air Academy, with the 9th promotion of the General Air Academy, as a jet pilot. Subsequently, he was awarded the title of fighter pilot by the US Air Force. The posts he was entrusted with included: command of the 12th Wing of the Torrejón Air Base; member of the Air Force General Staff (1992–1993); military representative to the NATO Military Committee and military delegate to the Permanent Representation of Spain to the Council of the Western European Union (WEU) (1994–1996).

On 26 July 1996, he was appointed Chief of Defence Staff. During his tenure, he promoted the professionalisation and modernisation of the Armed Forces, as a preliminary step to eliminating compulsory military service, and Spain's full incorporation into NATO's military structure took place.

Promoted to Air General in 1999, he was in favour of Spain promoting "the achievement of a European security identity, within the framework of NATO". On 15 December 2000, the government of José María Aznar appointed Admiral Antonio Moreno Barberá as the new JEMAD, replacing Santiago Valderas.
