= Chief of the Joint Defence Staff =

Assistance and support military officer to the Spanish Chief of the Defence Staff

- Jefe del Estado Mayor Conjunto de la Defensa
- Coat of Arms of the Defence Staff
- Incumbent; Lieutenant general José Antonio Herrera Llamas since 23 July 2024
- Ministry of Defence; Spanish Defence Staff
- Style: The Most Excellent
- Status: Highest-ranking military officer for the assistance and support to the JEMAD
- Abbreviation: JEMACON
- Member of: Defence Staff; Joint Defence Staff
- Reports to: Chief of the Defence Staff
- Seat: Vitruvio Street, Madrid
- Nominator: Minister of Defence; After being discussed in the Council of Ministers
- Appointer: Monarch; Countersigned by the Minister of Defence
- Term length: No fixed term
- Constituting instrument: Basic Criteria of National Defence and Military Organization Act of 1984
- Formation: January 11, 1984
- First holder: Divisional general Miguel Iñiguez del Moral

The Chief of the Joint Defence Staff (JEMACON) is a high-ranking military officer in the Spanish Armed Forces. The JEMACON is the closest assistant and advisor to the Chief of the Defence Staff and it is appointed by the Monarch at the request of the Minister of Defence.

To carry out its duties of assistance and advise, the JEMACON leads the Joint Defence Staff (EMACON), a military body integrated in the Defence Staff and formed by all the military personnel necessary to support the JEMAD in its duties.

The office of Chief of the Joint Defence Staff was created in 1984 along with the Chief of the Defence Staff position. Since 23 July 2024, the current and 19th JEMACON is Lieutenant general José Antonio Herrera Llamas.

== Joint Defence Staff ==
The JEMACON leads the Joint Defence Staff, the main advisory and assistance body to the Chief of the Defence Staff. The EMACON is integrated by:

- The Office of the Chief of the Joint Defence Staff. The Office is formed by the Chief of the Joint Defence Staff and its support personnel.
- The General Secretariat of the Joint Defence Staff (SEGEMACON). The SEGEMACON is the body responsible for assisting the JEMACON in the direction of the EMACON, as well as giving technical-administrative support to all the bodies of the Defence Staff. Likewise, it is responsible for all the advisory and support duties that are not responsibility of the EMACON's divisions.
- The Plans Division (DIVPLA). The DIVPLA is responsible for elaborating and coordinating the Armed Forces planning, developing all the duties related to the obtaining of material resources to the JEMAD and to guiding the transformation of the operative capabilities of the Armed Forces. Likewise, it is responsible for elaborating and coordinating the Armed Forces action before the international organizations for security and defence.
- The Strategy Division (DIVESTRA). The DIVESTRA is responsible for elaborating and coordinating the military strategy and the use of the Armed Forces. Likewise, it is responsible for elaborating and coordinating the action of the Armed Forces before the international organizations for security and defence in which the JEMAD has the responsibilities for planning and monitoring the derived activities of the bilateral and multi-lateral military relations. It also assists the JEMAD in the planning and strategic direction of the military operations.

== List of chiefs ==
No.	Rank	Name	Start	End	Branch	Refs.
1º	Divisional General	Miguel Iñiguez del Moral	28 January 1984	11 April 1985		
2º	Divisional General	José Pardo de Santayana y Coloma	11 April 1985	25 November 1986		
3º	Vice admiral	Gonzalo Rodríguez Martín-Granizo	25 November 1986	29 December 1987		
4º	Vice admiral	Pedro Regalado Aznar	29 December 1987	5 June 1990		
5º	Divisional General	José Antonio Romero Alés	5 June 1990	3 July 1992		
6º	Divisional General	Javier Pardo de Santayana y Coloma	3 July 1992	24 February 1993		
7º	Divisional General	Santiago Valderas Cañestro	24 February 1993	15 July 1994		
8º	Divisional General	Enrique Richard Marín	15 July 1994	27 December 1995		
9º	Vice admiral	Antonio Moreno Barberá	27 December 1995	3 July 1997		
10º	Divisional General	Juan Narro Romero	3 July 1997	24 November 1998		
11º	Vice admiral	Rafael Lorenzo Montero	24 November 1998	17 February 2001		
12º	Divisional General	Juan Luis Ibarreta Manella	17 February 2001	14 January 2004		
13º	Divisional General	Joaquín Tamarit Navas	14 January 2004	31 July 2004		
14º	Vice admiral	José María Terán Elices	31 July 2004	18 October 2008		
15º	Lieutenant general	José Luis López Rose	18 October 2008	23 June 2012		
16º	Divisional General	Juan Antonio Carrasco Juan	23 June 2012	24 June 2017		
17º	Admiral	Francisco Javier González-Huix Fernández	24 June 2017	5 August 2020		
18º	Lieutenant general	Fernando García González-Valerio	5 August 2020	23 July 2024		
19º	Lieutenant general	José Antonio Herrera Llamas	23 July 2024	Incumbent		
