= Javier Salto =

Spanish general to the Spanish Air and Space Force (born 1955)

Javier Salto Martínez-Avial
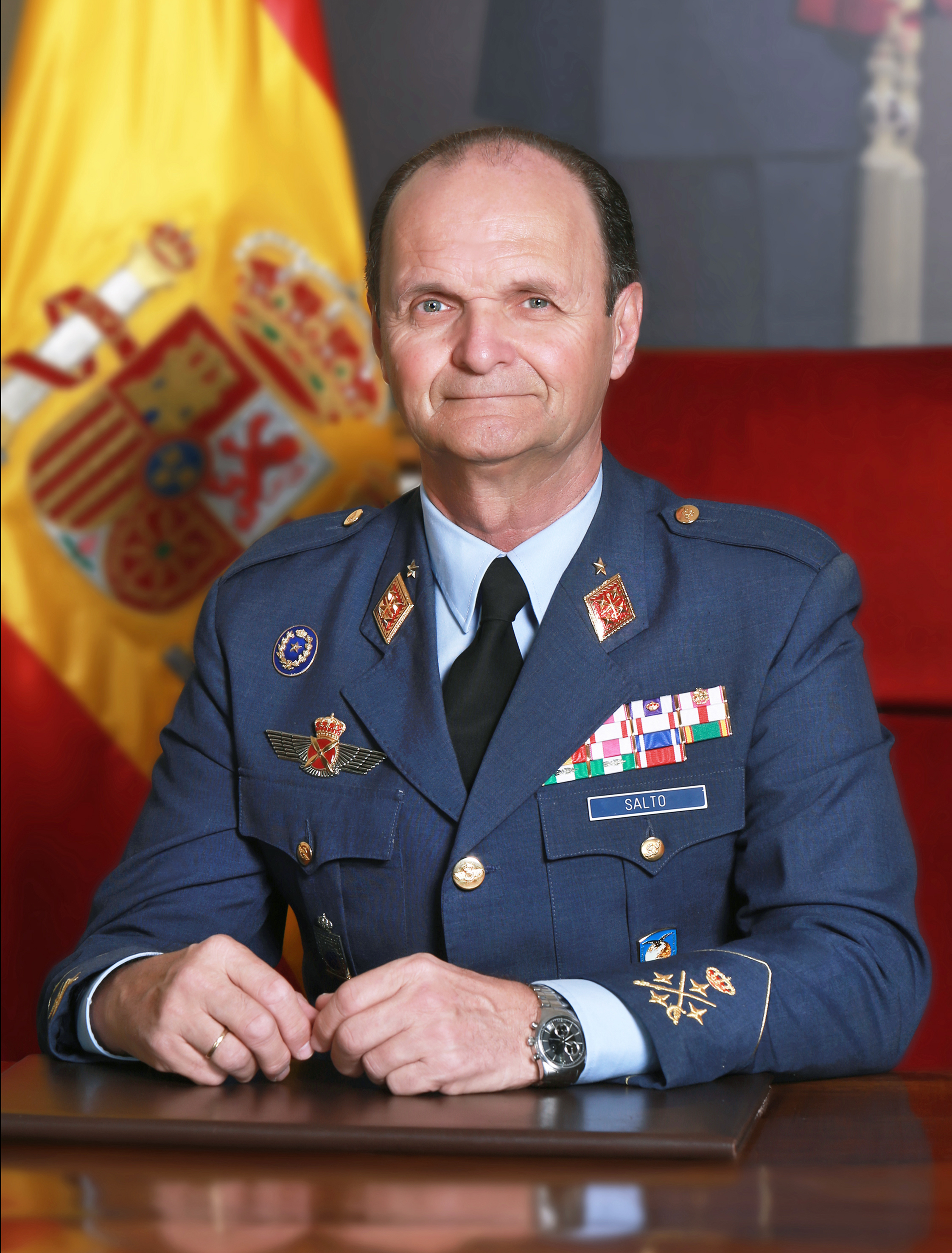
- Born: 10 December 1955 (age 70)
- Military career
- Allegiance: Spain
- Branch: Spanish Air and Space Force
- Rank: General of the Air
- Commands: Chief of Staff of the Air and Space Force (Spain)
- Awards: Order of Merit of the Guardia Civil

Javier Salto Martínez-Avial (born in Madrid, 15 December 1955) is a Spanish general to the Spanish Air and Space Force who served as Chief of Staff of the Air and Space Force from 1 April 2017 to 23 July 2024. With more than seven years at office, he was the longest-serving chief of staff since General Francisco Fernández-Longoria González (1945–1958).

A fighter and attack pilot, Salto has also received training as an advanced air traffic controller (FAC), air support, flight safety, high logistic management, photo-interpretation, supplies and observer. He has been an instructor pilot in the 462 Mirage F1 Fighter Squadron and has a United States General Staff Diploma, validated in Spain.

== Career ==
Salto entered the Air Force in 1974, was a student of the XXX promotion of the General Air Academy, reaching the rank of lieutenant in 1978 and completing his training as a war pilot in the School of Reactors.

Salto obtained his first operative assignment in the 464 Squadron of the Gando Air Base, piloting F-5A fighters. In 1981, within the same base, he moved to the 462 Squadron where he flew Mirage F1 fighters as an instructor pilot until 1993. Later, after validating his General Staff studies carried out in the United States, Salto occupied a position in the General Staff of the Canary Islands Air Command Headquarters.

In 1996 Salto was sent to NATO Headquarters in Naples (AIRSOUTH) for six months. The following year he moved to the NATO Agency for the Management of Eurofighter and Tornado (NETMA), located in Munich, as a specialist in operational factors for the Eurofighter 2000 Programme. Three years later, Salto was assigned to the Eurofighter 2000 Programme Office at the Air Force Logistics Support Command (MALOG).

In 2003 Salto became a Colonel and received command of Wing 11, a unit under the operational command of Combat Air Command (MACOM). He was also in charge of the base that houses this unit, located, despite its name, in the Sevillian municipality of Arahal. Salto was in charge of Eurofighter 2000 fighters. Between 2006 and 2008 he was Director of Operations of the NATO Combined Air Operations Centre No. 8 (CAOC 8) at Torrejón de Ardoz Air Base. In 2008 he was appointed Brigadier General and took over the Material Management Sub-Directorate of MALOG. The following year he was appointed head of the Eurofighter 2000 Programme. He attended, as a Spanish representative, the International Committee of Directors of this said program (BOD) and became its chairman.

In 2011, promoted to division general, Salto received the Weapons Systems Directorate from the Air Force Logistics Support Command. He was also Spanish representative on the International Steering Committee of the Eurofighter 2000 Programme, and on the Steering Committee of the A400 Programme. In 2012 he was in charge of the Canary Islands Air Command Headquarters and three years later, as Lieutenant General, he was appointed Director of the Technical Cabinet of the Minister of Defence.

On April 1, 2017, Salto received the command of the Air Force, being promoted to air general and taking possession of his position on April 3. Salto was replaced by General Francisco Braco Carbó on 23 July 2024. With more than seven years at office, he was the longest-serving chief of staff since General Francisco Fernández-Longoria González (1945–1958).

Salto is married, father of three daughters and is also a grandfather.

== Rank History ==
- 1973: Entry into General Air Academy
- 1977: Ensign
- 1978: Lieutenant
- 1988: Captain
- 1991: Commander
- 1998: Lieutenant Colonel
- 2003: Colonel
- 2008: Brigadier General
- 2011: Maj-Gen
- 2012: Lieutenant General
- 2017: Air General

Military offices
Preceded by Francisco Javier García Arnáiz	Chief of Staff of the Air and Space Force (Spain); 2017-	Incumbent
