= Fernando Alejandre Martínez =

Spanish officer

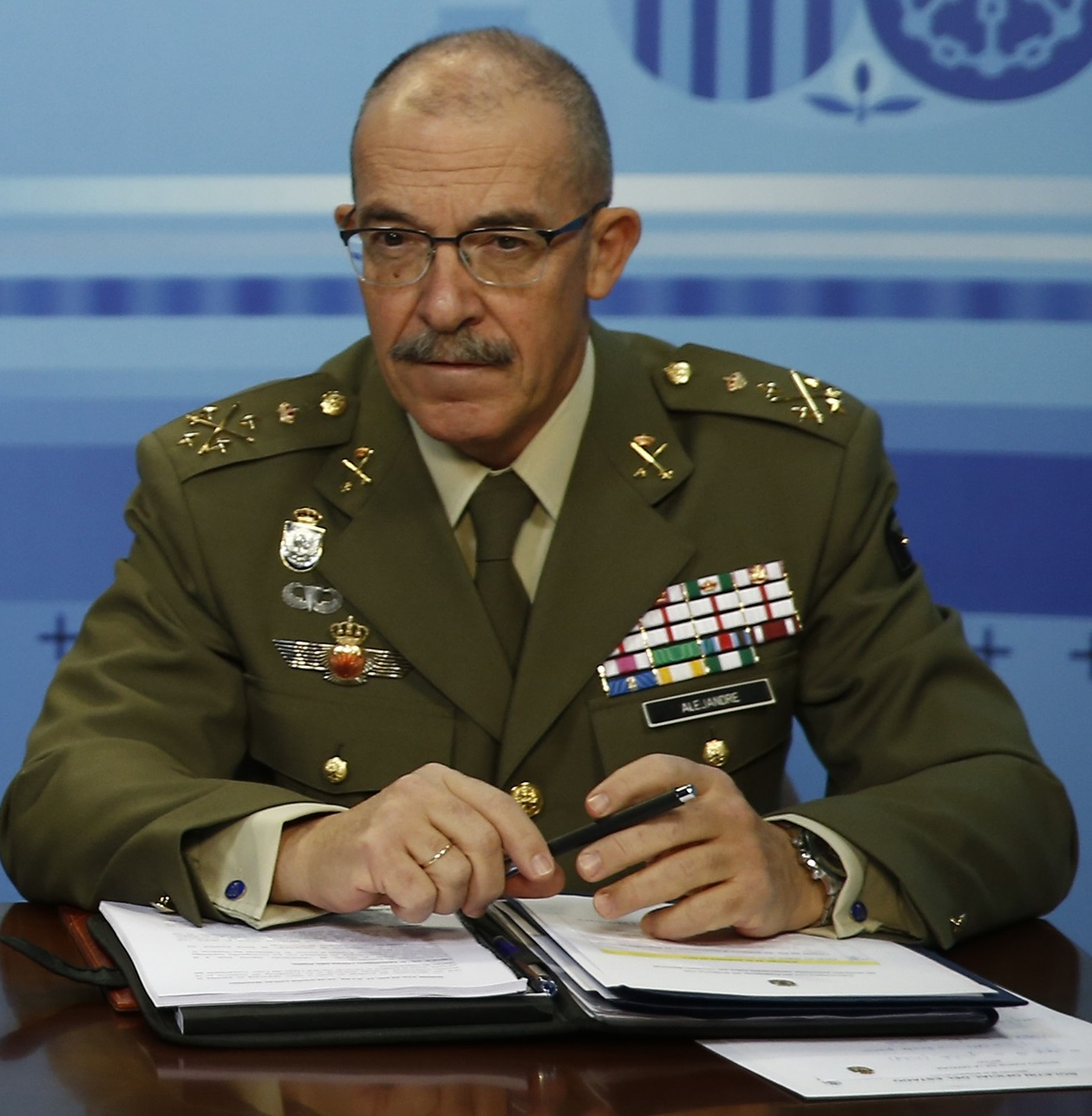
- Alejandre Martínez in 2017
- Born: 1956 (age 69–70); Madrid, Spain
- Allegiance: Spain
- Branch: Spanish Army
- Service years: 1979–2020
- Rank: General of the Army
- Commands: • Company of Paratroopers • Chief of Staff of the Army Command of Engineers • Operations Section of the Rapid Action Force Headquarters • Regiment of Pontoneros and Specialties of Engineers nº. 12 • Operations Division of the Chief of Army Staff; Second chief of staff for resources Second head of the NATO Joint Forces Command
- Awards: See Awards

Fernando Alejandre Martínez (born 1956) is a Spanish Army retired officer. A General of the Army, he served as the 10th Chief of the Defence Staff from 24 March 2017 to 15 January 2020, being succeeded by air general Miguel Ángel Villarroya.

== Career ==
Alejandre Martínez was born in 1956 in Madrid. He obtained the rank of lieutenant of engineers in 1979. On 24 March 2017 he was promoted to General of the Army.

He began his military career by serving in the Mixed Battalion of Parachute Engineers of the Army. He was at the head of the Company of Paratroopers.

In 1991, he was among the liaison officers deployed to Incirlik's Turkish base to organize the deployment of a Spanish contingent who provided humanitarian aid in northern Iraq during the Gulf War. He returned to the Parachute Brigade, before moving to the Army War School (at that time School of General Staff) to teach tactics.

During 1994, once again abroad, he received the command of the Engineers of the Spanish Tactical Association sent to Bosnia and Herzegovina.

After receiving the position of lieutenant colonel, he served as chief of staff of the Army Command of Engineers and having already become an officer of the General Staff, was assigned to the Land Operations Center of the Army's General Staff Operations Division. He later headed the Operations Section of the Rapid Action Force Headquarters. Ascended to colonel, he received the command of the Pontoneros Regiment and Engineers Specialties number 12, with quartering in the city of Zaragoza, before being appointed military advisor in the Ministry of Foreign Affairs at the time in which Miguel Angel Moratinos was titular of this one department.

During 2003, he was director of the KFOR Joint Operations Center at the Film City base in Pristina.

In 2010, he was promoted to brigadier general, and he was appointed head of the Operations Division of the General Staff of the Army. Two years later, as a division general, he was sent to the NATO Allied Military Headquarters in Europe (SHAPE) as the second chief of staff for resources.

In October 2015, promoted to lieutenant general, he was assigned to the Brunssum base (Netherlands) as the deputy head of the NATO Joint Forces Command. This position was the one of greater rank of the NATO occupied by a Spanish military at that moment.

He stopped at this destination on March 24, 2017, when it was announced that he would be named Chief of the Defence Staff. He was dismissed on January 15, 2020. After retiring from active service, in February 2020 he was appointed member of the General Assembly of the Royal and Military Order of Saint Hermenegild and on June 30, 2021, he was appointed Vice President of the Ferrer-Dalmau Foundation.

== Awards ==
- Grand Cross of Military Merit (White Badge).
- Grand Cross of the Royal and Military Order of San Hermenegild.
- Commander with Star of the Royal and Military Order of Saint Hermenegild.
- Commander ofRoyal and Military Order of Saint Hermenegild.
- Cross of the Royal and Military Order of San Hermenegild.
- Cross of Military Merit (White Badge) Seven times.
- Medal of Suffering for the Motherland (Green Badge for being injured at peace).
- United Nations Medal (Protection Force in Croatia and Bosnia and Herzegovina).
- Meritorious Service Medal of the United States of America.
- NATO Non-Article 5 medal for the Balkans.
- Chief Commander of the Legion of Merit (2018)
- Serge Lazareff Prize (2018).
- Knight's Cross of the Royal and American Order of Isabella the Catholic.
- Order of Civil Guard Merit (White Badge).
- Commander of the Legion of Honour (2019)

Badges

- Parachutist Badge.
- Badge of Permanence in Parachute Forces of the Army.
- Badge of Permanence in the General Staff of the Army.
- Parachutist Badge.
- United States Army Engineer School Crest.
- Badge of Military Headquarters Allied in Europe (NATO).
- Badge of NATO Joint Forces Command Barracks Distinguished in Brunssum.
- Badge of the Chief of the Defence Staff (Spain).

Military offices
Preceded by Fernando García Sánchez	Chief of the Defence Staff; 24 March 2017 – 15 January 2020	Succeeded by Miguel Ángel Villarroya
