= Spanish Armed Forces Intelligence Center =

- Centro de Inteligencia de las Fuerzas Armadas
- Coat of Arms of the CIFAS
- Active: Since 25 June 2004; 21 years ago
- Country: Spain
- Branch: Defence Staff
- Type: Military intelligence agency
- Size: Classified
- Garrison/HQ: Retamares Base, Madrid
- Website: Official website

Commanders
- Current commander: Lt. Gen. Antonio Romero Losada

The Spanish Armed Forces Intelligence Center (Centro de Inteligencia de las Fuerzas Armadas, CIFAS ) is a Spanish intelligence agency, part of the Defence Staff (EMAD). It has the function of providing the Chief of the Defence Staff, the Ministry of Defence and the Prime Minister with information on risk situations and crises from abroad. It is led by a director with the rank of general.

It is a unique and joint body of the Spanish Armed Forces in matters of military intelligence; it controls the systems of intelligence and electronic warfare, maintaining the intelligence centers of the Army, Navy and Air Force, functional dependence on the CIFAS. Founded in 2004, it replaces the former Intelligence Division of the Defence Staff.

== Functions ==
- Provide the Chiefs of Staff of the Armies with information for the development of their functions in peacetime missions.
- Provide the Chief of Defence Staff (JEMAD) with the necessary military intelligence for the direction of operations and the design of the strategy.
- Coordinate his task with the General Staff of Defense and its Headquarters.
- To be a complementary military intelligence body of the National Intelligence Centre, with whom it is coordinated through the Joint Military Intelligence Plan.
- Collaborate with the intelligence structures of the international organizations of which Spain is a part and with those of the Allied countries.

== Directors ==
- Brigadier general Valentín Martínez Valero (2004–2008) (Army)
- Lieutenant general Miguel Romero López (2008–2011) (Air Force)
- Vice admiral Juan Antonio Cuadrillero Pinilla (2011–2013) (Navy)
- General of division Francisco José Gan Pampols (2013–2017) (Army)
- General of division Francisco Rosaleny Pardo de Santayana (2017–2019) (Army)
- Lieutenant general Antonio Romero Losada (2019–) (Army)
