= Marquess of Kindelán =

Hereditary title of Spanish nobility

Marquessate of Kindelán
- Creation date: 1 October 1961
- Created by: Francisco Franco
- First holder: Alfredo Kindelán Duany
- Last holder: María Kindelán Cuéllar
- Remainder to: Heirs of the body of the grantee
- Status: Deprived under the Democratic Memory Law on 21 October 2022

Marquess of Kindelán (Spanish: Marqués de Kindelán) was a hereditary title of Spanish nobility. It was created on 1 October 1961 by Francisco Franco in favor of Alfredo Kindelán Duany, Spanish general.

The title was abolished on October 21, 2022, after the approval of the Democratic Memory Law.

== List of Marquesses ==
- Alfredo Kindelán Duany, 1st Marquess of Dávila (1961–1962)
- Alfredo Kindelán y Núñez del Pino, 2nd Marquess of Kindelán (1964–1991)
- Alfredo Kindelán Camp, 3rd Marquess of Kindelán (1992–2018)
- María Kindelán Cuéllar, 4th Marchioness of Kindelán (2019–2022)
