= José Jiménez Ruiz =

Spanish general

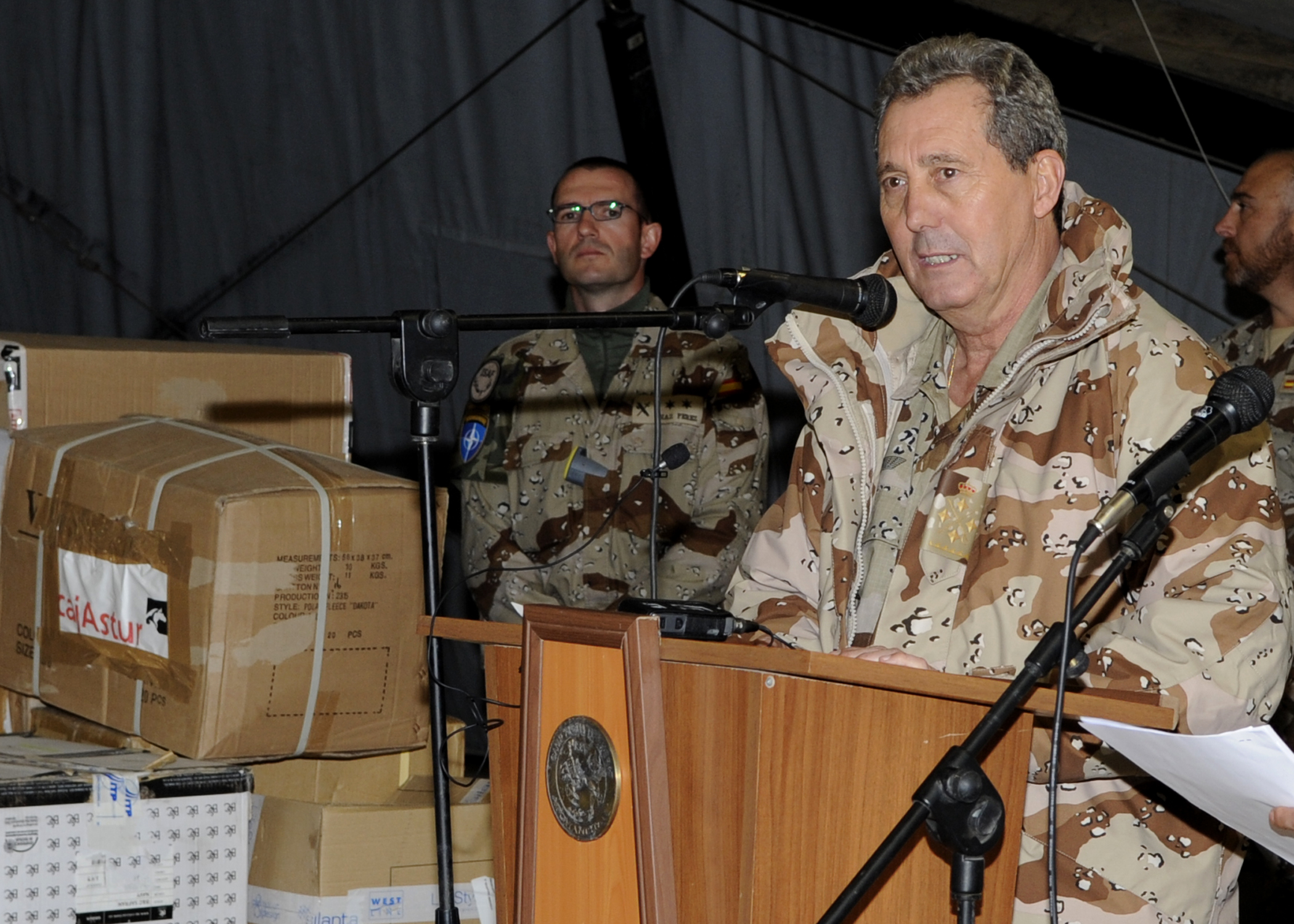
- Born: José Jiménez Ruiz; May 26, 1946 (age 80); Madrid, Spain
- Military career
- Allegiance: Spain
- Branch: Spanish Air Force
- Service years: 1979 – 2012
- Rank: General
- Nickname: Pepito
- Commands: Chief of Staff of the Air Force (Spain); Canary Island Command

José Jiménez Ruiz (born 24 May 1946) is a Spanish Air Force general. He became Chief of Staff of the Air Force on 18 July 2008. General Francisco Javier García Arnáiz replaced him on 31 July de 2012.

== Dates of rank ==
- Caballero - 1966
- Alférez Alumno - 1968
- Teniente - 1970
- Capitán - 1974
- Comandante - 1983
- Teniente Coronel - 1989
- Coronel - 1997
- General de Brigada - 2001
- General de División - 2005
- Teniente General - 2008
- General del Aire - 2008

Military offices
Preceded by Francisco José García de la Vega	Chief of Staff of the Air Force; 18 July 2008 – 31 July de 2012	Succeeded by Francisco Javier García Arnáiz
