= Alfredo Kindelán =

Spanish general (1879–1962)

The Most Excellent The Marquess of Kindelán OIC
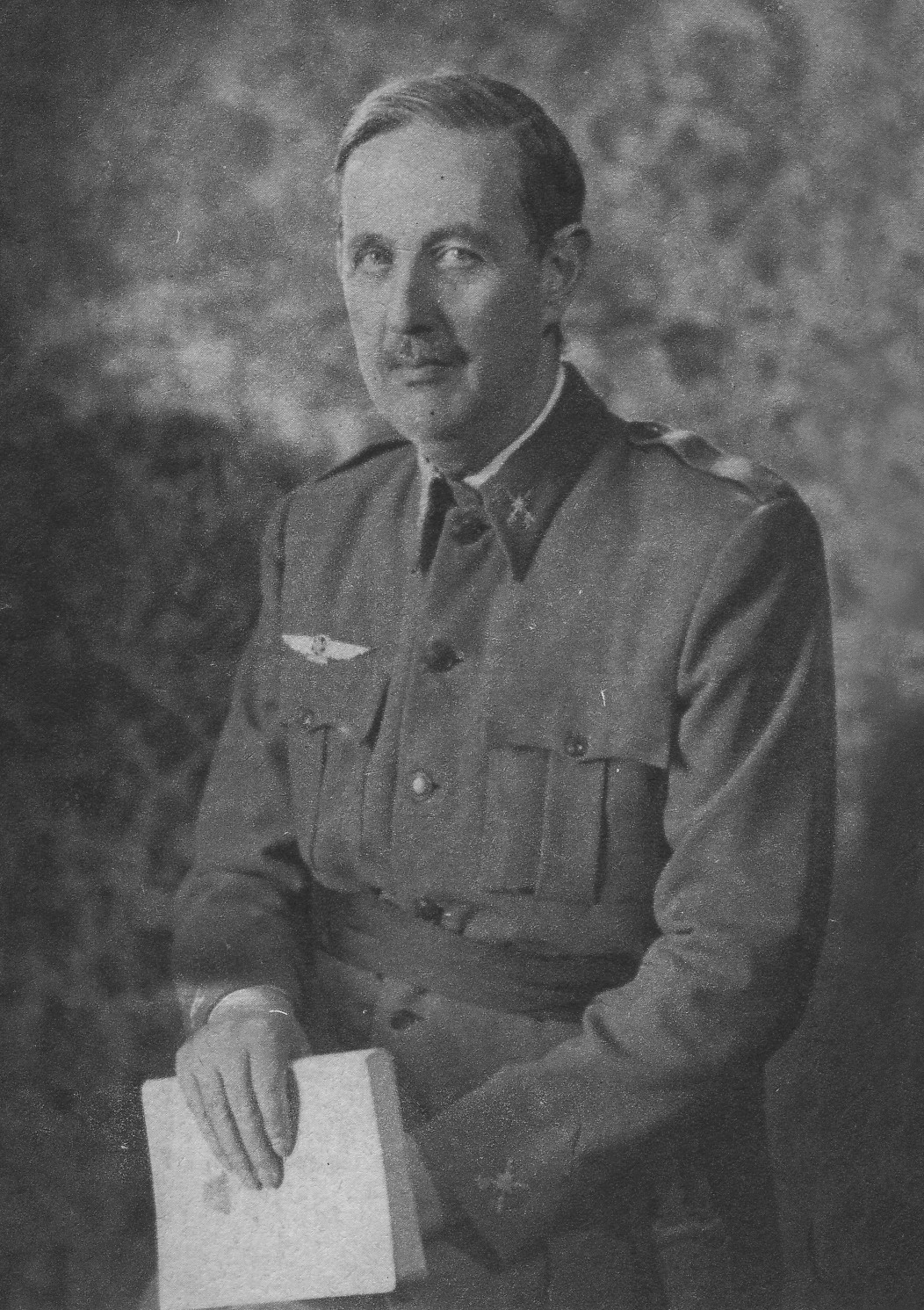
- Born: Alfredo Kindelán y Duany; 13 March 1879; Santiago de Cuba, Captaincy General of Cuba
- Died: 14 December 1962 (aged 83); Madrid, Spain
- Military career
- Service years: 1899–1949
- Rank: Captain General
- Conflicts: Rif War; Spanish Civil War

Alfredo Kindelán y Duany, 1st Marquess of Kindelán (13 March 1879 – 14 December 1962) was a Spanish general and politician. A close ally of Francisco Franco before and during the Spanish Civil War, their relationship would later become strained as Kindelán emerged as a leading advocate for a swift restoration of the monarchy. He belonged to the Kindelán family, a noted Spanish family of Irish origin.

== Early career ==
Kindelán was a prominent figure within the Spanish Armed Forces and was founder and head of the Spanish Air Force. A staunch supporter of the monarchy, he took voluntary exile in April 1931 rather than live in a republic. Kindelán was one of the earliest collaborators of Francisco Franco, along with José Millán Astray, Luis Orgaz Yoldi and the leader's brother Nicolás.

== Spanish Civil War ==
Kindelán was central to the conspiracies amongst the nationalist generals and took command of the right wing of the Air Force upon the outbreak of the Spanish Civil War. In the early stages of the war he directed his operations from his place of exile in Gibraltar before returning to Spain. His importance to the actual war effort in the field, as well as that of the Air Force as a whole, declined after the arrival of the Aviazione Legionaria from Fascist Italy which soon became the main air combat unit. Nonetheless, he remained an influential figure and an important strategist.

One of Franco's most trusted aides, it was Kindelán who initially raised the prospect of Franco as overall commander of the Nationalist forces. He also helped to ensure that the role came with the promise of Franco ultimately assuming the role of head of state, largely because he trusted that Franco would restore the monarchy at the earliest possible opportunity.

In terms of the conduct of the war he was central to the planning of Emilio Mola's assault on the north in March 1937, having been convinced by Juan Vigón of the need for a swift resolution to the war. Franco's failure to follow this course became a bone of contention in the relationship between the two, with Kindelán regularly writing to Franco to plead with him to abandon his attacks on Valencia in favour of all-out war in the north. He further criticised Franco's involvement in the long-running Battle of the Ebro and suggested that his decision to commit to this rather than an attack on Barcelona added four months to the war.

== Fall from grace ==
Following the nationalist victory, Kindelán made it clear that he viewed Franco's regime as a regency and sought a restoration of the Alphonsine line as soon as possible. Prone to criticism of Franco, whom he considered an equal rather than a superior, he was sidelined in August 1939 when he was given the role of military commander of the Balearic Islands, an effective demotion. He was also replaced as Air Force chief in 1939 by Juan Yagüe in a move Franco later claimed had been done at the instigation of the Axis powers. Kindelán was personally close to the United Kingdom, to such an extent that the British authorities attempted to use him to force Franco to restore the monarchy in 1942 in order to push Spain away from the Axis powers. Nothing came of the scheme however.

Kindelán enjoyed a return to favour of sorts in 1941 when he became Captain General of Catalonia, a promotion designed by Franco to improve the standing of the military as a buffer against the power of Ramón Serrano Súñer and the Falange. In November 1942, when Minister of the Army Carlos Asensio Cabanillas was pushing for Spain to finally enter the war, Kindelán privately informed Franco that were this to happen he would personally overthrow Franco and restore the monarchy. Given that Kindelán enjoyed the support of a number of leading generals Franco initially did not react but after three months he removed Kindelán from his new position. Kindelán then served as head of the Escuela Superior del Ejército although he was sacked from this position in August 1945 after a stinging attack on Franco in a fiercely pro-monarchist speech. Meanwhile, his memoirs were delayed until 1945 and even then were censored due to a passage of fairly restrained criticism dealing with Franco's conduct of the war in the north.

== Later years ==
Removed from influence, Kindelán was free to devote his time to the various upper class conspiracies designed to ensure the restoration of Infante Juan, Count of Barcelona to the Spanish throne. When in 1946 the so-called 'Lausanne manifesto' was published calling for immediate restoration, Franco identified Kindelán as being the ringleader of those who had signed the document and ordered his imprisonment. Following an appeal to Franco by Fidel Dávila Arrondo on the grounds of Kindelán's strong service record and his advancing age El Caudillo relented and instead sent Kindelán into exile in the Canary Islands.

In 1961, Kindelán was ennobled as a Marqués, although the gesture was interpreted as an ironic joke on the part of Franco, mocking the fact that, despite all his efforts, Kindelán was still not living in the monarchy that he so desired. He died the following year with Spain still under Franco.

Spanish nobility
New creation	Marquess of Kindelán; 1961–1962	Succeeded by Alfredo Kindelán
