= General of the Air (Spain) =

Highest General officer rank in the Spanish Air and Space Force

General of the Air General del Aire (Spanish)
- Shoulder and sleeve insignia
- Country: Spain
- Service branch: Spanish Air and Space Force
- Rank group: General officer
- NATO rank code: OF-9
- Formation: 19 May 1999
- Next higher rank: Captain general of the Air Force
- Next lower rank: Lieutenant general
- Equivalent ranks: General of the Army (Army); Admiral General (Navy)

General of the Air (Spanish: General del Aire) also called Air General, is a general officer and the second highest possible rank in the Spanish Air and Space Force. A General of the Air ranks immediately above a lieutenant general and is equivalent to a general of the army and an admiral general. There is not equivalent in the Civil Guard or in the Spanish Navy Marines; in both cases the top rank is Lieutenant general.

The rank was created in 1999 to adapt the Spanish military rank to the ranks of NATO. This is the highest rank that a career officer can reach, because the next higher is captain general and that rank is reserved to the Spanish monarch as commander-in-chief of the Armed Forces (even that sometimes has been given as honorary rank to some generals).

The General of the Air insignia consist in a baton crossed over a saber under a Royal Crown and a star in every angles that form the crossed baton and the saber. Being under a Crown means that the rank is part of the generalship (the group of generals of the Armed Forces), the baton and the saber means command and the four stars means the rank of General. This insignia was used before 1999 by the Sovereign as Captain General.

== Promotion ==
The promotion to General of the Air is reserved to two positions. These are, the Chief of the Defence Staff and the Chief of Staff of the Air and Space Force.

Both positions are appointed by the Monarch at the government's proposal. The first is directly nominated by the Prime Minister and the second is nominated by the Minister of Defence. Being appointed Chief of the Defence Staff means the automatically promotion to the rank of General of the Air. The same happens with the Chief of Staff of the Air and Space Force with the exception if the official appointed has the rank of divisional general, in that case, the official needs to be promoted first to Lieutenant general.

== Living Generals of the Air ==
As of January 2026, there are the 9 Generals of the Air alive, these are:

Promoted	Name	Others
21 May 1999	Juan Antonio Lombo López	Chief of Staff of the Air Force (1997-2001)
20 April 2001	Eduardo González-Gallarza Morales	Chief of Staff of the Air Force (2001-2004)
25 June 2004	Francisco José García de la Vega	Chief of Staff of the Air Force (2004-2008)
18 July 2008	José Jiménez Ruiz	Chief of Staff of the Air Force (2008-2012)
19 July 2008	José Julio Rodríguez Fernández	Chief of the Defence Staff (2008-2011)
27 July 2012	Francisco Javier García Arnáiz	Chief of Staff of the Air Force (2012-2017)
31 March 2017	Javier Salto Martínez-Avial	Chief of Staff of the Air and Space Force (2017–2024)
15 January 2020	Miguel Ángel Villarroya Vilalta	Chief of the Defence Staff (2020–2021)
23 July 2024	Francisco Braco Carbó	Chief of Staff of the Air and Space Force (2024–present)

The most recent Air General to die was Federico Michavila Pallarés on 10 February 2022, who served as Chief of the Defence Staff from 1986 to 1990.
