= Joint Cyberspace Command =

- Mando Conjunto del Ciberespacio
- Joint Cyberspace Command emblem

Intelligence agency overview
- Formed: February 19, 2013; 13 years ago
- Headquarters: Retamares Base, Madrid, Spain
- Motto: Lealtad y constancia. Ingenio y Destreza. (Loyalty and constancy. Ingenuity and Dexterity)
- Intelligence agency executive: Francisco Javier Roca Rivero, Chief Commander
- Parent Intelligence agency: Defence Staff
- Website: www.emad.mde.es

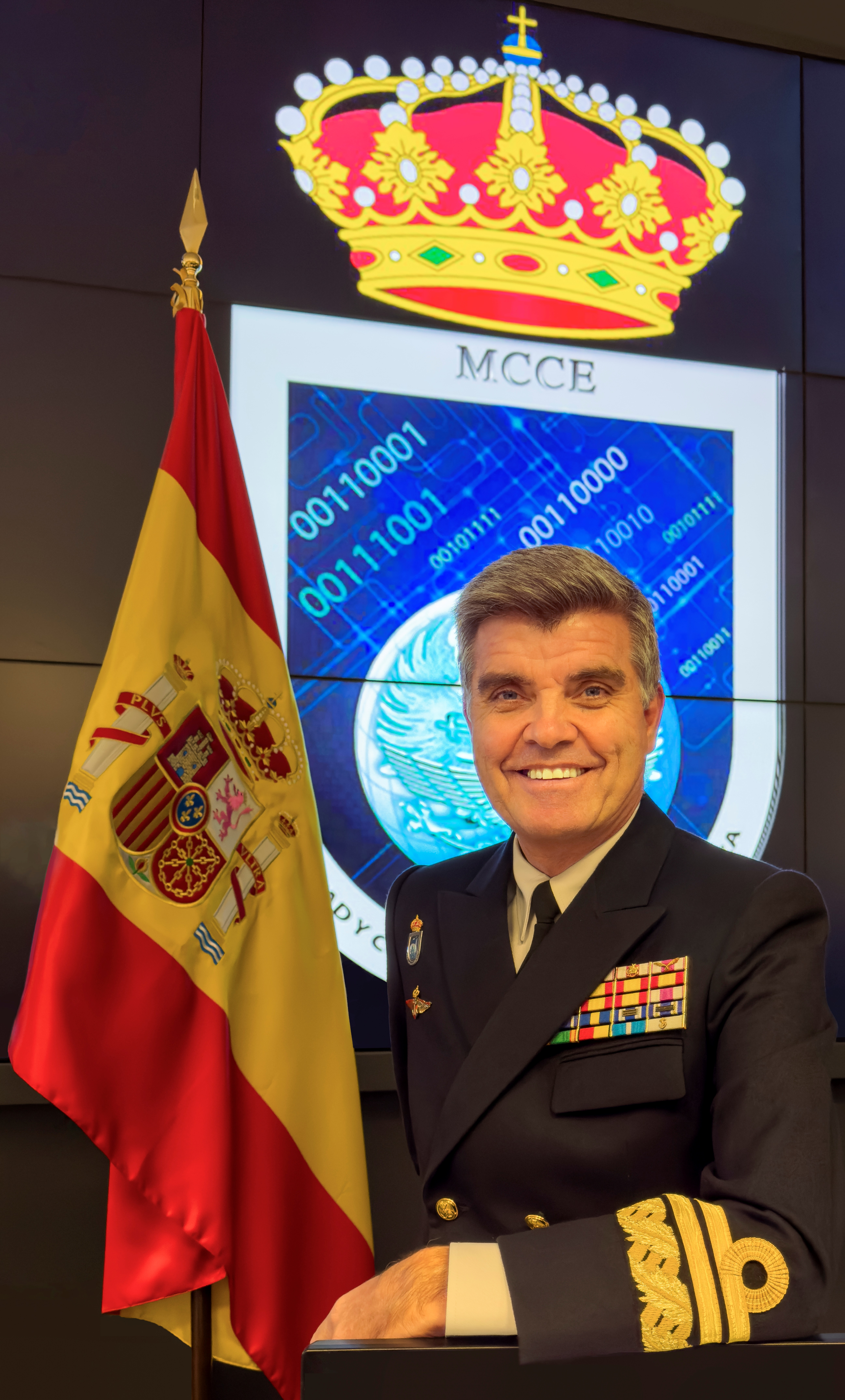
Vice Admiral Francisco Javier Roca Rivero, current Chief Commander.

The Joint Cyberspace Command (MCCE), known until 2020 as Joint Cyber-Defence Command (MCCD), is a Spanish cyberspace service of the Defence Staff responsible for planning and carrying out the actions related to cyber defence in networks and information and telecommunications systems of the Ministry of Defense or others that might be entrusted, as well as contributing to the adequate response in cyberspace to threats or aggressions that may affect to the National Defense.

In this sense, the MCCD directs and coordinates, in the matter of cyber defense, the activity of the centers of response to incidents of security of the information of the different branches of the Armed Forces; it exercises the timely, legitimate and proportionate response in cyberspace to threats or aggressions that may affect the National Defense and defines, directs and coordinates awareness, training and specialized training in this area. In addition, he is responsible for the development and detail of the Information Security policies in the Information and Telecommunications Systems (SEGINFOSIT) and the direction of execution and control of compliance with these policies, within the scope of the Ministry of Defense.

The MCCD was created on February 19, 2013 by a Defence Ministry Order 10/2013, by which the Joint Cyber-Defence Command is created. In 2020, it was renamed Joint Cyberspace Command. The current Chief Commander of the MCCD is vice admiral Francisco Javier Roca Rivero.

== Functions ==
The functions of the Joint Cyberspace Command are:

- Ensure free access to cyberspace, in order to fulfill the missions and tasks assigned to the Armed Forces, through the development and use of the necessary resources and procedures.
- Guarantee the availability, integrity and confidentiality of the information, as well as the integrity and availability of the networks and systems that manage and have it commissioned.
- Guarantee the operation of the critical services of the Armed Forces' information and telecommunications systems in a degraded environment due to incidents, accidents or attacks.
- Obtain, analyze and exploit information on cyber attacks and incidents in networks and systems of their responsibility.
- Exercise the timely, legitimate and proportionate response in cyberspace to threats or aggressions that may affect the Defence of Spain.
- To direct and coordinate, in the matter of Cyberdefence, the activity of the centers of response to incidents of security of the information of the Armed Force and the one of operations of security of the information of the Ministry of Defence.
- To exercise the representation of the Ministry of Defence in the matter of military cyber defence in the national and international sphere.
- Cooperate, in the area of cyber-defence, with the national centers for response to information security incidents, in accordance with the Spanish cybersecurity strategies and policies in force, as well as with other military centers to respond to security information incidents in the international sphere.
- Define, direct and coordinate awareness, training and specialized training in cyber defence.

== Organization chart ==
The Joint Cyberspace Command is composed by the following bodies:

- The MCCE Command.
- The Secretariat.
- The Joint Cyberspace Command Staff (EMMCCD).
  The assistance body to the Chief Commander of the MCCE led by the Chief of Staff of the Joint Cyber-Defense Command.
  It's divided in six sections: the Coordination Section (C-0), the Cyberintelligence and Security Section (C-2), the Operations Section (C-3), the Plans Section (C-5), the Preparation Section (C-7) and the Cooperation and Representation Section (C-9).
- The Operations Command (JOPS).
  It's the Joint Command department responsible for the execution of cyber defense operations
- The Administration and Services Command (JAS).
  It's the administrative and technical department of the Joint Command.

== Commanders ==
No.	Image	Rank	Name	Service	Start of Term	End of Term
1.		Brigadier general	Carlos Gómez López de Medina	Air Force	11 July 2013	30 July 2018
2.		Divisional general	Rafael García Hernández	Air Force	30 July 2018	1 December 2023
3		Vice Admiral	Francisco Javier Roca Rivero	Navy	1 December 2023	Incumbent

== See also ==
- List of cyber warfare forces
- United States Cyber Command
- Cyber force
- People's Liberation Army Strategic Support Force
- Norwegian Cyber Defence Force
