= Defence Staff (Spain) =

Organ of the Ministry of Defence of the Spanish Armed Forces

- Estado Mayor de la Defensa
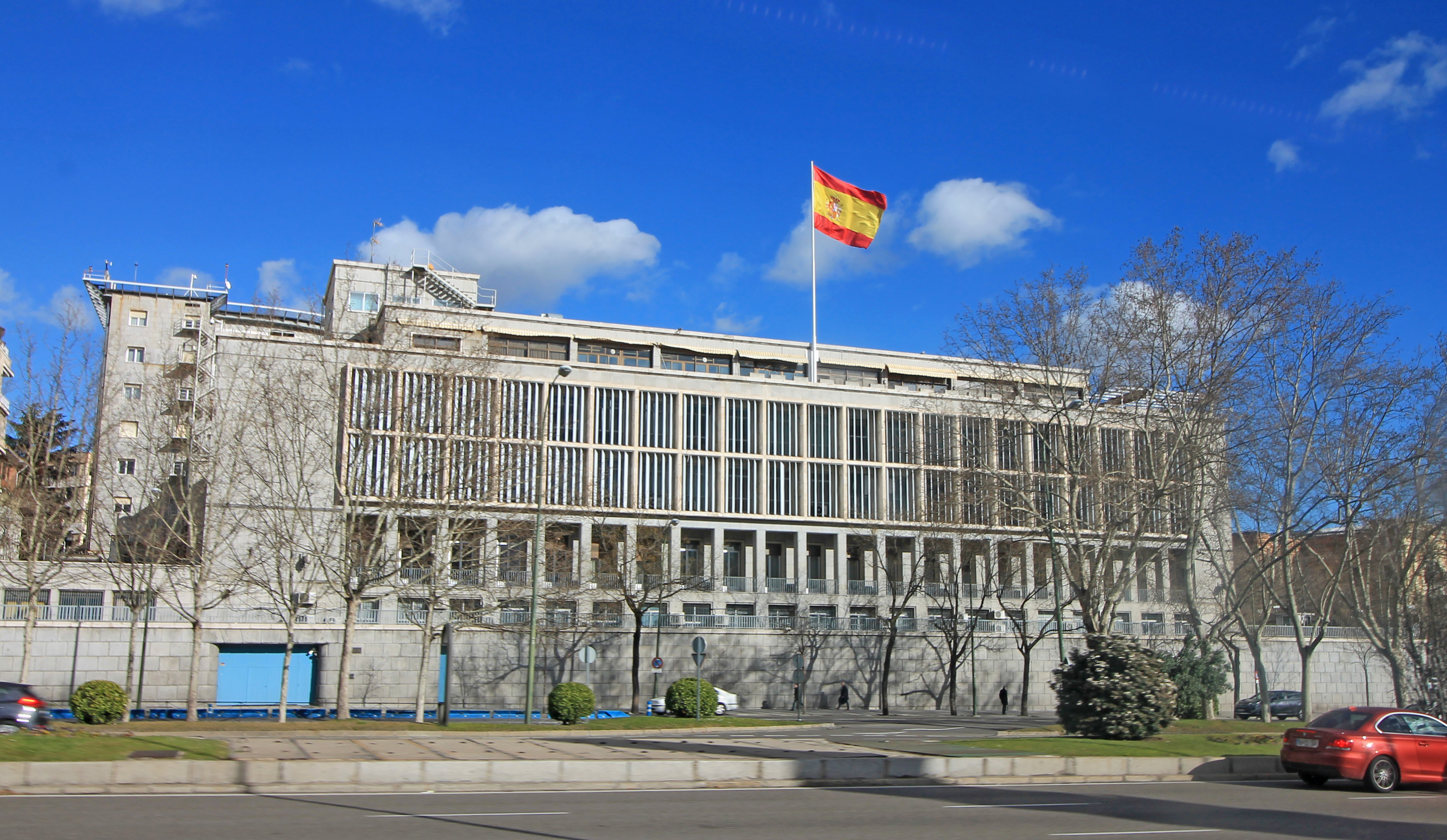
- Seat of the EMAD, on La Castellana
- Active: 1984–present
- Country: Spain
- Branch: Spanish Armed Forces
- Type: Military staff
- Role: Coordination of the joint actions of the three branches of the Armed Forces
- Part of: Ministry of Defence
- Headquarters: Madrid

Commanders
- Current Chief: Admiral General Teodoro Esteban López Calderón

Insignia
- Coat of Arms

The Defence Staff (Spanish: Estado Mayor de la Defensa, EMAD), based in Madrid, is an organ of the Ministry of Defence that operates as an auxiliary to the Chief of the Defense Staff (JEMAD) within the organic structure of the Spanish Armed Forces and in a military hierarchical position of dependence on the former.

== Functions ==
The EMAD is regulated by the Organic Law 5/2005, of 17 November 2005, on the National Defence, the Royal Decree 1551/2004 and the Order of Defence 1076/2005. Its objectives are to support the Chief of Staff, develop military strategy and design military operations. These are basic organs of the Defence Staff:

- The Joint Defence Staff.
- The Operations Command.
- The Spanish Armed Forces Intelligence Center
- The Joint Cyberspace Command.
- The General Headquarters of the Defence Staff.
  - The Permanent Secretariat of the Council of Chiefs of Staff.
  - The Secretariat of the Chief of Defence Staff.
  - The Head of Economic Affairs.
  - The Human Resources Headquarters.
  - The Security and Services Headquarters.
- Permanent operating organizations.
  - The Maritime Security and Surveillance Command.
  - The Defence Command and Air Operations.
  - The Military Emergencies Unit.
- Spanish military bodies related to international or multinational organizations.

The aims of the EMAD are the assistance to the Prime Minister and the Minister of Defence, the command of the military structure, the direction of the military operations, the planning and joint action of the Spanish Armed Forces and multinational actions, as well as the coordination of the Chiefs of Staff of the Army, the Navy and the Air Force.

== See also ==
- Chief of the Defence Staff (Spain)
- Spanish Armed Forces
- Board of Joint Chiefs of Staff
