= Admiral general (Spain) =

Four star general of the Spanish Navy

Admiral general Almirante general
- Sleeve and shoulder insignia
- Country: Spain
- Service branch: Spanish Navy
- Rank group: Flag officer
- NATO rank code: OF-9
- Formation: 19 May 1999; 26 years ago
- Next higher rank: Captain general of the Navy
- Next lower rank: Admiral
- Equivalent ranks: General of the Army (Army); General of the Air (Air and Space Force)

Admiral general (Spanish: Almirante general) also called general admiral, is a four-star flag officer and the second highest possible rank in the Spanish Navy. Admiral general ranks immediately above admiral and is equivalent to a General of the Army and a General of the Air. There is no equivalent in the Civil Guard or in the Spanish Navy Marines; in both cases the top rank is Lieutenant general.

The rank was created in 1999 to adapt Spain's military ranks to better correspond with those of NATO. It is the highest rank a Spanish naval officer can reach, as the only higher rank is that of captain general, which can only be held by the Spanish monarch as commander-in-chief of the country's armed forces (although sometimes it has been given as an honorary rank to some generals).

The admiral general's insignia consists of a baton crossed over a saber under a royal crown. Below this and forming an imaginary diamond, four stars. Furthermore, in the sleeves of the uniform, a twisted rope and over this one three 14mm stripes and a star 50mm away. Being under a Crown means that the rank is part of the generalship (the group of generals of the Armed Forces), the baton and the saber means command and the four stars means the rank of General. This insignia was used before 1999 by the Sovereign as Captain General.

== Promotion ==
Promotion to admiral general is reserved to two positions. These are, the Chief of the Defence Staff and the Chief of Staff of the Navy.

Both positions are appointed by the Monarch at the government's proposal. The first is directly nominated by the Prime Minister and the second is nominated by the Minister of Defense. Being appointed Chief of the Defense Staff means an automatic promotion to the rank of admiral general. The same happens with the Chief of Staff of the Navy with the exception if the official appointed has the rank of vice admiral, in that case, the official needs to be promoted first to admiral.

== Living admiral generals ==
As of January 2026, there are 9 admiral generals alive, these are:

Promoted	Name	Others
21 May 1999 (ad honorem)	Carlos Vila Miranda	Chief of Staff of the Navy (1990–1994)
21 May 1999 (ad honorem)	Juan José Romero Caramelo	Chief of Staff of the Navy (1994–1997)
16 December 2000	Francisco José Torrente Sánchez	Chief of Staff of the Navy (2000–2004); Secretary General of Defence Policy (2004–2007)
30 April 2004	Sebastián Zaragoza Soto	Chief of Staff of the Navy (2004–2008)
18 July 2008	Manuel Rebollo García	Chief of Staff of the Navy (2008–2012)
30 December 2011	Fernando García Sánchez	Chief of the Defence Staff (2011–2017)
27 July 2012	Jaime Muñoz-Delgado	Chief of Staff of the Navy (2012–2017)
31 March 2017	Teodoro E. López Calderón	Chief of Staff of the Navy (2017–2021); Chief of the Defence Staff (2021–present)
25 April 2023	Antonio Piñeiro Sánchez	Chief of Staff of the Navy (2023–present)
