= Infantry Regiment "Castilla" No. 16 =

Spanish military unit

16th Infantry Regiment "Castilla"
- Traditional coat of arms of the Regiment
- Active: 1 June 1793 – present
- Country: Spain
- Allegiance: Spain
- Branch: Spanish Army
- Type: Infantry (until 2015); Multirole (since 2015)
- Garrison/HQ: San Francisco Barracks, Menacho Barracks, Cañada de Sancha Brava Barracks, successively, all in Badajoz
- Nickname: "The Hero"
- Patron: Immaculate Conception
- Decorations: Laureate Cross of Saint Ferdinand

The 16th Infantry Regiment "Castilla" (since 2015, Armored Regiment) is a multirole unit of the Spanish Army, although until the latest organic reform of the Army, it was always part of the infantry branch. It was established at the initiative of Pedro de Alcántara Álvarez de Toledo, 13th Duke of the Infantado, who also served as its first colonel. On 3 April 1793, a request for the Regiment's creation was submitted to King Charles IV, who approved it on 15 April of the same year. Its initial designation was the Volunteers of Castile Regiment, as notified by the War Minister on 25 April 1793, conveying the King's wish for this name. The Regiment was founded with three battalions, each comprising four companies of fusiliers.

It earned the nickname "The Hero” due to its bravery against the French during the Second Siege of Zaragoza, particularly in the bayonet assault on Monte Torrero and the defense of the Convent of Jesús on 21 December 1808. As noted by infantry captain Antonio Gil Álvaro in 1893, “this nickname stems from the Regiment’s actions during the Second Siege of Zaragoza.” The Supreme Central Junta, then located in Cádiz, decreed that these forces be called “Meritorious of the Homeland” for their “heroic and eminent service.”

On 26 July 1852, Queen Isabella II awarded the collective Laureate Cross of Saint Ferdinand to the Regiment, along with the corresponding “tie” for its banner, for its “heroic merit” in actions on 23 May 1839 at the quarries of Utrillas, in the province of Teruel, against Carlist forces. The Volunteers of Castile Regiment was the precursor to the later 16th Infantry Regiment "Castilla", which in turn evolved into the current 16th Mechanized Infantry Regiment "Castilla", once the first tanks and other mechanized assets arrived at its Badajoz garrison, with its first commander from 17 February 1966 being Lieutenant Colonel Adolfo Rovira Recio.

Its coat of arms features a golden castle, crenelated, with three donjons and adorned with sable on a gules field, with the Laureate Cross of Saint Ferdinand hanging from the lower point; the castle reflects the region of its designation.

== Background ==
When King Louis XVI was guillotined in January 1793—a culminating event of the revolution that began in France four years earlier—and given that he was a relative of Charles IV, the King of Spain at the time, a sense of horror gripped all levels of Spanish social, political, and religious establishments. Within the political class, however, opinions were sharply divided: some, like the Count of Aranda, a former minister under King Charles III, opposed interference in the internal affairs of the neighboring country, while others strongly favored declaring war on France. The appointment in May 1793 of the Badajoz native Manuel Godoy, a member of the pro-war faction, as Captain General and thus the political and military leader of the war, tipped the balance of opinions toward intervention.

The army's structure at that time was highly unusual, with a large number of senior officers but a severe shortage of lower-ranking officers and soldiers, a situation described as “macrocephalic,” as each lieutenant general commanded approximately 150 soldiers out of a total of 50,000 troops. When the army went into the field, the scarcity of material and human resources, ammunition, provisions, and artillery and infantry equipment became starkly evident.

== Documents of its creation ==
The complete texts of the three documents that marked the creation of the Volunteers of Castile Regiment are preserved.

=== Request by the 13th Duke of the Infantado to the King ===
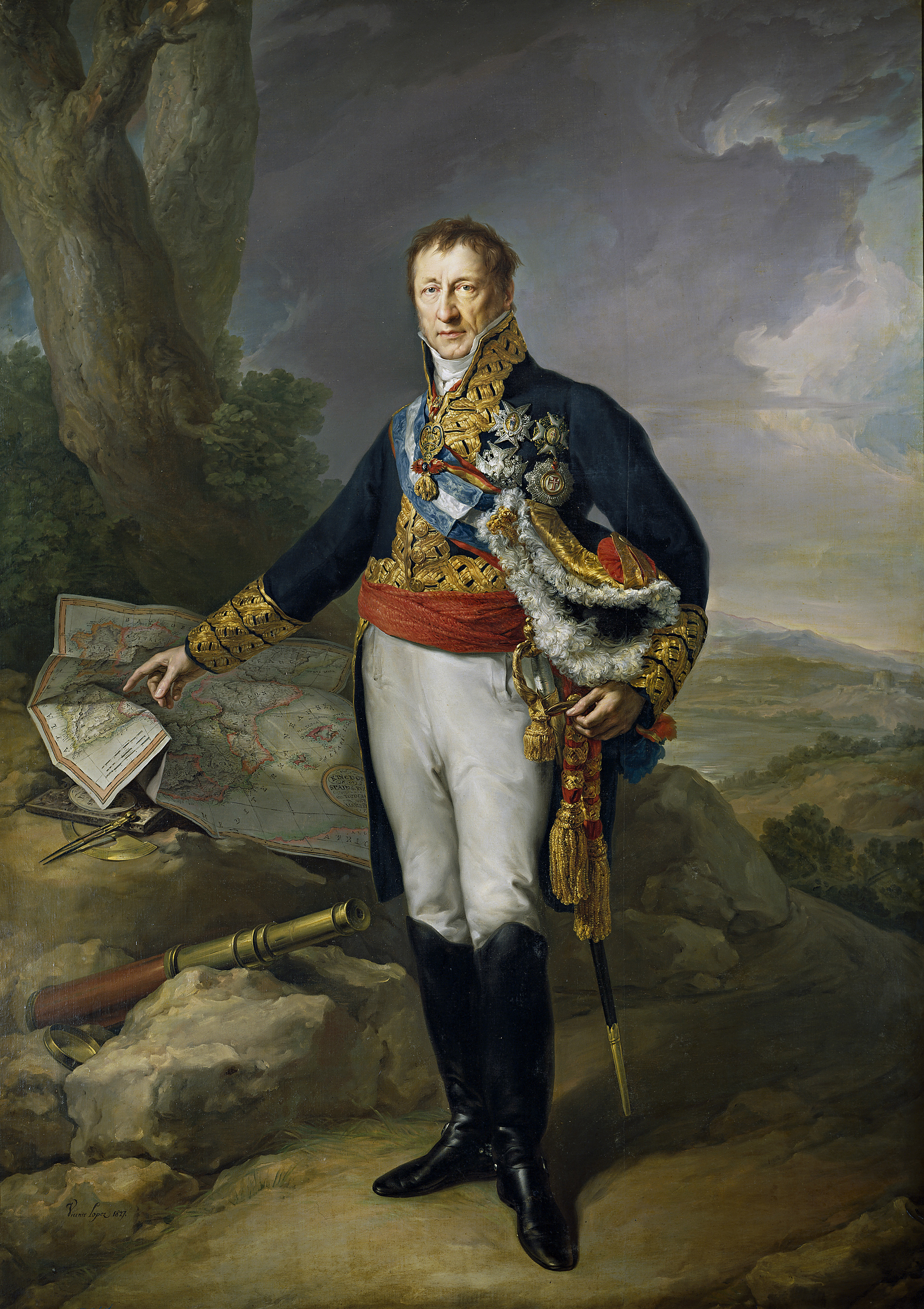
Pedro de Alcántara Álvarez de Toledo, 13th Duke of the Infantado, founder of the regiment

Madrid, 3 April 1793. Don Pedro de Toledo y Salm Salm, Duke of the Infantado, deeply moved by the just motives that have determined Your Majesty’s august will to declare war on the French, filled with the greatest interest in the honor of the Crown and love for Your Majesty, has the honor to offer Your Majesty both his person and all his assets and faculties, humbly requesting that you deign to accept, in particular, the offer of an Infantry Regiment, which he will promptly raise with volunteer personnel from his own lands and under the designation of "King’s Auxiliaries," together with a field artillery train as proposed in the attached plan, which outlines the Regiment’s strength by class, designed with the latest advancements in European military tactics in mind. The primary motive for choosing this offer over others is to provide a means to serve gratuitously and personally in the Army as a Colonel, to set an example for those who enlist, if Your Majesty deigns to appoint him as the head of said Corps, and to facilitate Your Majesty’s satisfaction in employing a portion of the many meritorious officers currently in the Army as supernumerary attached to various Infantry Regiments, whom Your Majesty may appoint as you see fit, as the petitioner desires for the greater service of Your Majesty. If this offer meets Your Majesty’s approval, the petitioner only requests the privilege to appoint the Lieutenant Colonel, Sergeant Major, and the Officers of the first Company of Fusiliers and the Company of Hunters, to place in these positions, free of charge, certain officers of distinguished birth, zeal, and love for Your Royal Service.

=== Acceptance by His Majesty the King ===
Response from the War Minister in Aranjuez on 15 April 1793:

:The King has been informed of Your Excellency’s request dated the 3rd of this month, in which, following the impulses of his gratitude and love for service, you offer to His Majesty to raise an Infantry Regiment under the designation of King’s Auxiliaries, as outlined in the plan included by Your Excellency, recruiting the personnel from the towns of your lands.

His Majesty has viewed with the greatest pleasure a proposition so commendable and reflective of your zeal, which he graciously accepts and has ordered me to convey his thanks in his Royal name; however, to ensure all units are on the same footing and with the uniformity required for the best service, the King wishes this new Regiment to consist of three Battalions with the number and type of personnel specified in the September 2nd regulation.

His Majesty agrees that Your Excellency be the Colonel of said Regiment, as requested, also leaving to your choice the individuals to fill the positions of Lieutenant Colonel and the officers of the first companies of fusiliers and hunters. The name of the Regiment will be determined by His Majesty.

=== Designation of the Regiment ===
On 25 April, the War Ministry wrote to the Duke of the Infantado:

:His Majesty has accepted the offer made by the Duke of the Infantado to raise a regiment by recruiting personnel from the towns of his lands. The regiment will be named the Volunteers of Castile and will consist of 1,903 soldiers, as specified in the regulation of September 2nd.

== History ==
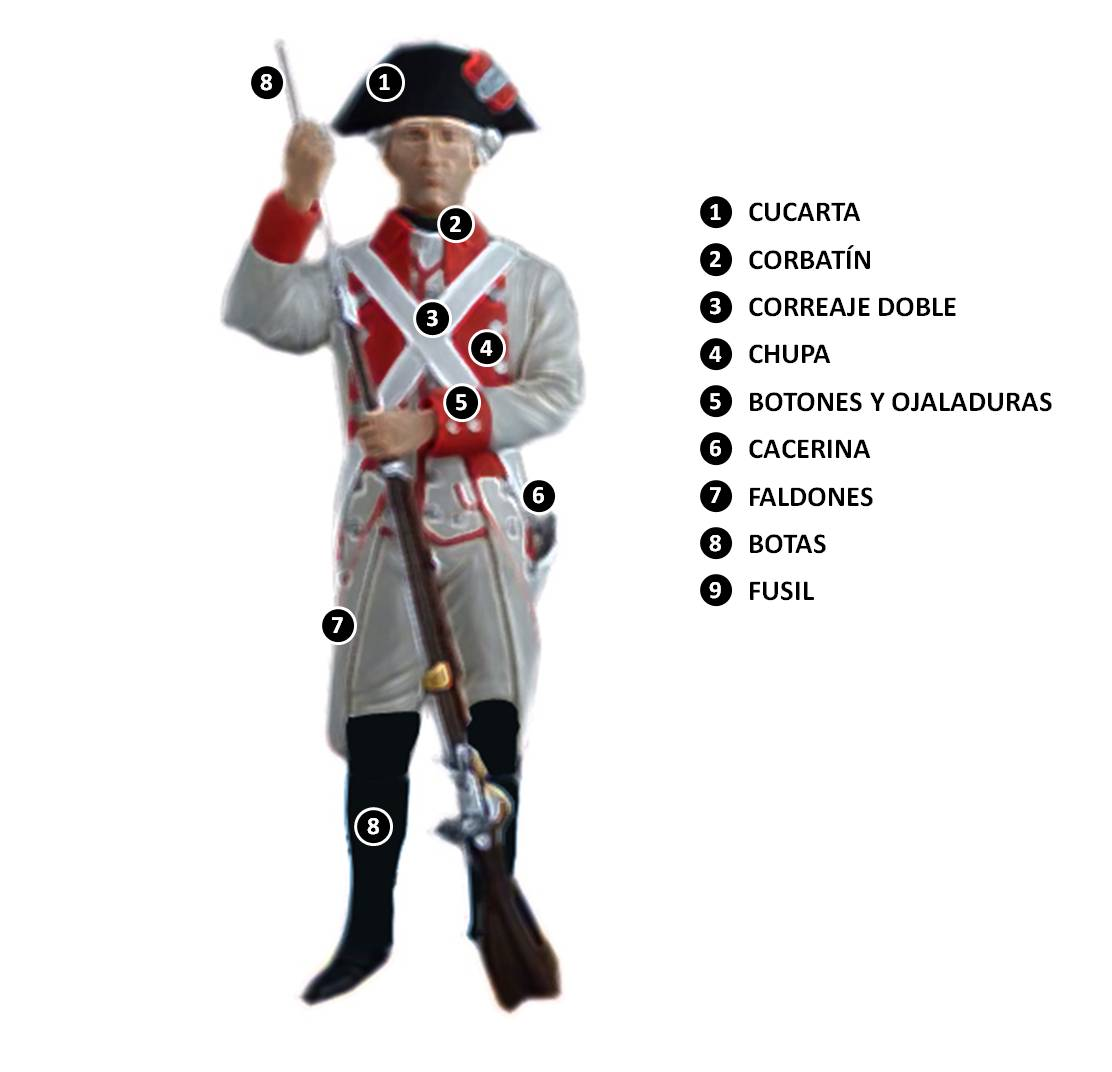
Soldier of the Volunteers of Castile Regiment

Before the Regiment was established, the line infantry's uniform included a hat with a galloon and a white wool braid loop. The hair was styled with a curl on each side and gathered into a greased and powdered queue at the back. Breeches, justacorps, and waistcoats were made of white cloth, with crimson facings, collars, cuffs, and linings. The uniform of a fusilier of the Volunteers of Castile Regiment at the time of its creation, in accordance with the Royal Order of 22 June 1791, was as follows: the justacorps, waistcoat, and breeches were to be white, with crimson facings, collars, cuffs, and piping—the decorative braid, cord, or trim on the edges or seams of clothing. The buttons were to be white, inscribed with “Voluntarios de Castilla.” The hat, a tricorn, was to have no braid but a white loop and white buttons. The cockade was to be made of red wool, the crossbelts of white or slightly buffed leather, with a black calfskin cartridge pouch. The gaiters were made of raw canvas, fastened on the side, with black calfskin garters. The shoes were to have three soles, made of black calfskin, with a white metal buckle.

At the start of the Roussillon Campaign, the uniform changed significantly, consisting of brown cloth, a short cassock, and boots reaching mid-thigh in black cloth. The poncho for warmth was also brown, worn rolled and slung from left to right when not in use. The hat was round with one brim turned up, secured with a yellow woolen loop. The evolution of the uniform continued throughout the 19th and 20th centuries, until 1988, when the entire unit adopted a camouflage uniform suited to the terrain, following the trend of most modern European armies.

Once the decision was made to intervene in the war against France, the nobility contributed money and men, while the Church and cities provided economic and material resources to form army corps. In June 1793, the Duke tasked Sergeant Major Joaquín Blake with organizing the regiment. Blake trained and formed the first battalion in Leganés and Vicálvaro, both of which are on the outskirts of Madrid. The Regiment then marched to the Royal Site of Aranjuez, where King Charles IV reviewed it and praised “the fine and splendid bearing of the Volunteers of Castile.”

=== From the Roussillon Campaign to the Spanish War of Independence ===
==== Battles of Roussillon and Coll de la Creu del Principi ====
For the impending military action, three army corps were formed: two defensive ones positioned in Gipuzkoa and Aragon, and a third, offensive one in Catalonia, commanded by General Antonio Ricardos. This third corps included 1,501 men from the Volunteers of Castile Regiment. Its first combat action took place during the War of the Pyrenees of 1794–1795. The Volunteers of Castile Regiment was assigned to the corps operating in the highlands of Vallespir, and on 19 May 1794, at the outset of hostilities, the “Castilla” engaged in combat at the Coll de la Creu del Principi, under the command of the Count of Puerto. The general-in-chief of the Spanish forces, Count of the Union, made an extensive and highly favorable mention of the Volunteers of Castile Regiment for its bravery and achieved objectives.

==== Battles of Terradas and La Jonquera ====
During the period when the Regiment was in the Muga mountains under General Juan de Courten, its tactical experience was already recognized due to its prior exploits in the War of the Pyrenees. Luis de Marcillac praised the unit for its valiant actions at the foot of the Terrades mountain, stating:

Courten was at the foot of the Terradas mountain; twice his troops charged, and twice they were repelled; on the third attempt, with bayonets fixed, they stormed into the enemy batteries and seized them.

In that bloody action, Sergeant Major Blake was wounded. On the night of 17 August, the first and second battalions advanced toward La Jonquera. The first battalion captured La Jonquera at dawn on 21 August but had to retreat, unable to withstand the French counterattack. Months earlier, on 19 November, French forces attacked the Spanish position at Figueres, where, after fierce and bloody combat, the Spanish commander-in-chief, the Count of the Union, was killed, and the “Castilla” Regiment withdrew to its barracks in Girona.

==== Battles of Bañolas and Pontós ====
In early 1795, the “Castilla” took the stronghold of Roses, but in March, the French appeared with 7,000 soldiers and 300 cavalry in Besalú. In an offensive maneuver, the Volunteers of Castile, under General Gonzalo O'Farrill, marched on Bañolas to attack the French and secured victory. The Regiment also participated in the battle of Pontós on 13 July of that year, under the command of the Marquis of La Romana.

==== Capture of Fort Manuel ====
Days after the Battle of Pontós, the Volunteers of Castile Regiment and other infantry units were tasked with capturing a heavily fortified position called Fort Manuel, located on extremely rugged and difficult terrain, where soldiers had to climb a narrow path single-file. The assailants surprised the sentries and, while the French troops were in reserve, took the fort alongside another infantry corps without casualties. However, seeing the position taken before his orders, the commanding general ordered the column to retreat immediately, disregarding the mission's success. As the French observed the Spanish withdrawing and becoming easy targets on the rugged, defenseless path, they decimated the Spanish soldiers with successive volleys, causing heavy casualties. The retreating chiefs, officers, and soldiers shouted, “This is an outrage, a betrayal!” The general's anger was such that he ordered soldiers who lost their weapons to carry distaffs until they could arm themselves with enemy rifles, an action interpreted more as humiliation than punishment, a stance no other commander or officer would have taken, especially given the Volunteers of Castile Regiment's valiant performance. Feeling undeserving of this treatment, soldier Pedro Álvarez wrote a document that the official chronicler omitted to respect the general's memory.

==== Peace of Basel and Treaty of San Ildefonso ====
On 22 July 1795, the Peace of Basel was signed, whereby the French returned occupied territories. Under General Moncey, the French had reached Miranda de Ebro toward the Pancorbo pass in the Province of Burgos, while the royal family prepared to flee to America. Simultaneously, the Archbishop of Toledo issued a pastoral letter urging the clergy to secure religious treasures to prevent them from falling into French hands. With the peace achieved through the Treaty of Basel, the Regiment marched to garrison in Madrid.

Manuel Godoy, a native of Badajoz and newly titled Prince of the Peace, signed another treaty with France, the Treaty of San Ildefonso, obligating Spain to provide France with numerous troops. This treaty was a new version of the Family Pacts of the previous century. Under it, Spain was required to supply France with fifteen ships, 18,000 infantry, 6,000 cavalry, and corresponding artillery. This reinforcement enabled war against England in October 1796. Consequently, the Volunteers of Castile Regiment was stationed in Extremadura, near the Portuguese border, to counter England if necessary. It remained there for eleven months before moving to Catalonia, where it was assigned the number “40.” In November 1798, the British occupied Menorca, so in May 1799, 110 soldiers from the second company of the first battalion of “Castilla” embarked from Barcelona for the Balearic Islands. With the 1802 Treaty of Amiens, which restored Menorca in exchange for the Trinidad Island, these soldiers returned, and the Regiment was stationed in Valencia as a garrison, with the number “35.”

=== Spanish War of Independence ===
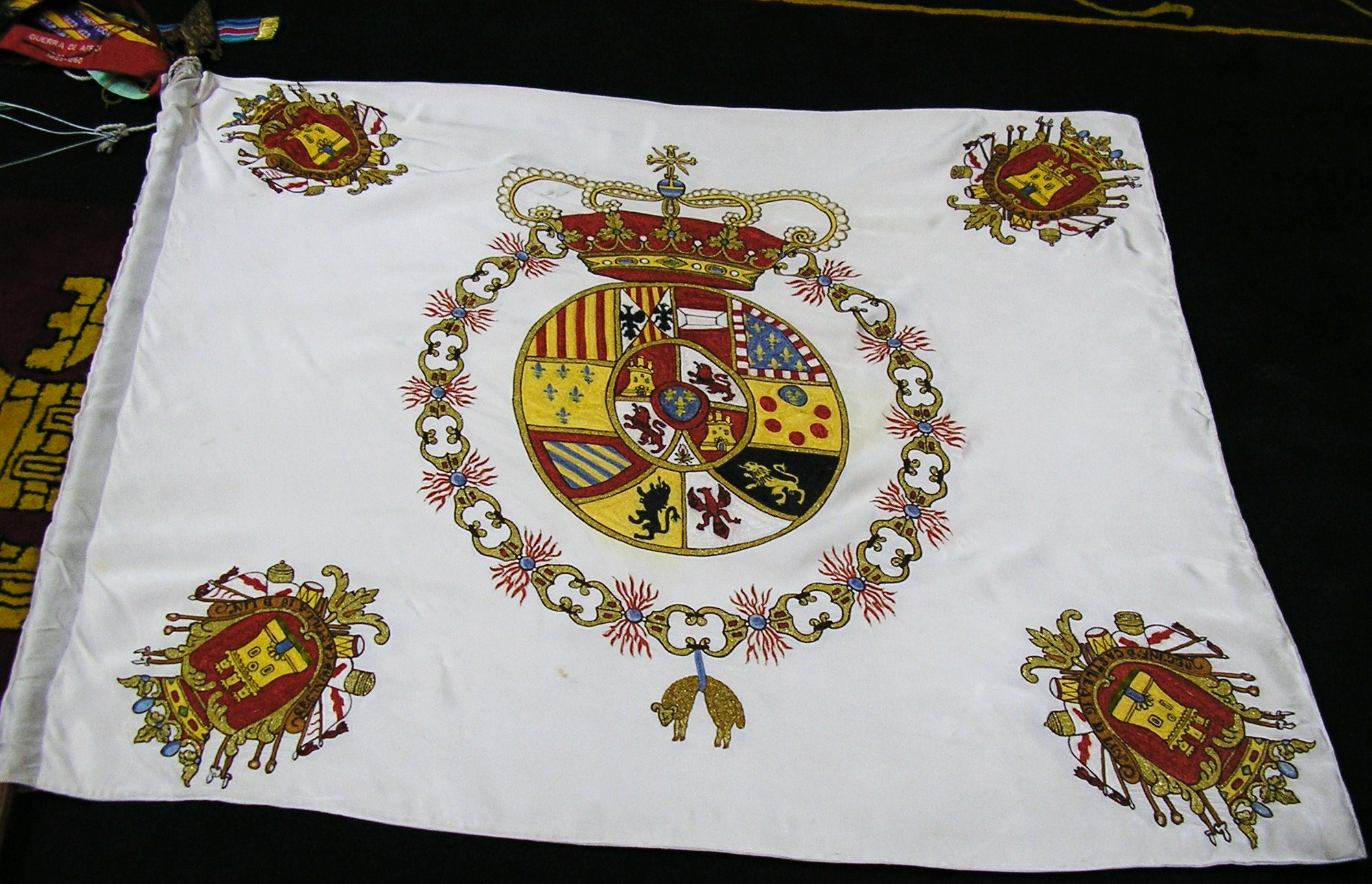
Colonel's Banner of the Castilla Regiment.

Following the events of 2 May 1808, the Spanish people rose against the French invaders. The French, observing the behavior of Spanish rulers, believed victory would be straightforward. After their defeat at Bailén, Napoleon personally intervened to lead the war. Meanwhile, the Regiment moved from Cartagena through Valencia and Madrid to Zaragoza to aid General José de Palafox in the First Siege of Zaragoza, defeating the French troops led by General Jean-Antoine Verdier. The Regiment drove the French from their trenches, forcing them to abandon the siege on 25 August. Shortly after, Napoleon arrived with 100,000 soldiers and defeated the Spanish forces, including the Volunteers of Castile Regiment, then under Field Marshal Felipe Augusto de Saint-Marcq. In that defeat at Tudela in 1808, the Regiment suffered a severe blow when the French captured its Colonel's Banner, which was taken as a trophy to the Les Invalides Museum in Paris. In 1809, the Regiment was tasked with defending Tejares, near Zaragoza, courageously defending houses and convents such as San Agustín. Despite being defeated, taken prisoner by French troops under General Jean Lannes, and deported to France, it earned the nickname “The Hero” for the first time, as reflected in its coat of arms. This nickname was awarded by the Supreme Central Junta in Cádiz for its performance in the Second Siege of Zaragoza. These details were reported by infantry captain Antonio Gil Álvaro in 1893.

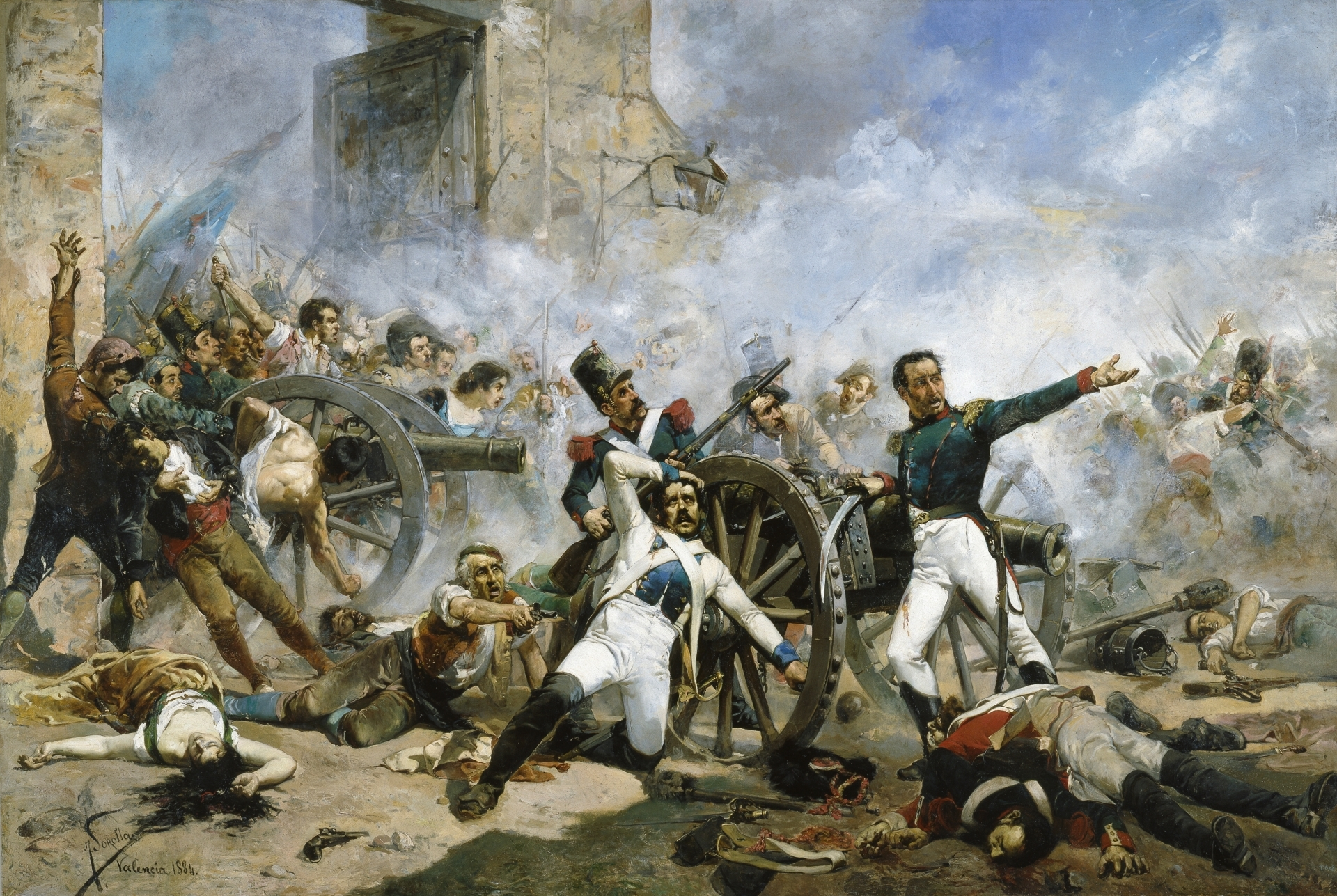
Defense of the Monteleón Artillery Park on 2 May 1808, preserved in the Víctor Balaguer Library Museum

The Colonel's Banner is cataloged in the Museum of the Army under number 21,138. It is made of white silk, featuring the royal coat of arms at its center and four shields in its corners, each with a golden castle on a gules field, bordered by military trophies and surmounted by the royal crown. Around it is the inscription “16th Line Infantry Regiment Castilla.”

On 28 February 1810, the Regiment was reorganized around the third battalion, which had operated throughout the year in the Levantine region, engaging in fierce clashes with French forces in Morella and, in 1811, in Molinaseca. The Regiment's most significant engagement began on 25 August in Sagunto, where it was part of the 2nd Army, within the Division commanded by Field Marshal José Miranda. In that battle, due to poor deployment and command decisions, the left flank, where the Volunteers of Castile Regiment was positioned, collapsed, forcing a retreat to safer positions.

The Regiment then marched to defend Valencia, fighting in the suburbs until ordered to withdraw within the city's fortified walls. The French army, led by Marshal Suchet, forced the Spanish troops, including the Volunteers of Castile Regiment, to surrender on 16 January 1812. Coincidentally, the Spanish forces were commanded by General Blake, who had been the Regiment's Sergeant Major at its founding. The French captured a vast haul, including twenty-three generals (including Blake), nearly 1,000 officers, over 15,000 soldiers, 350 artillery pieces, and twenty-one banners.

=== Mexican War of Independence ===
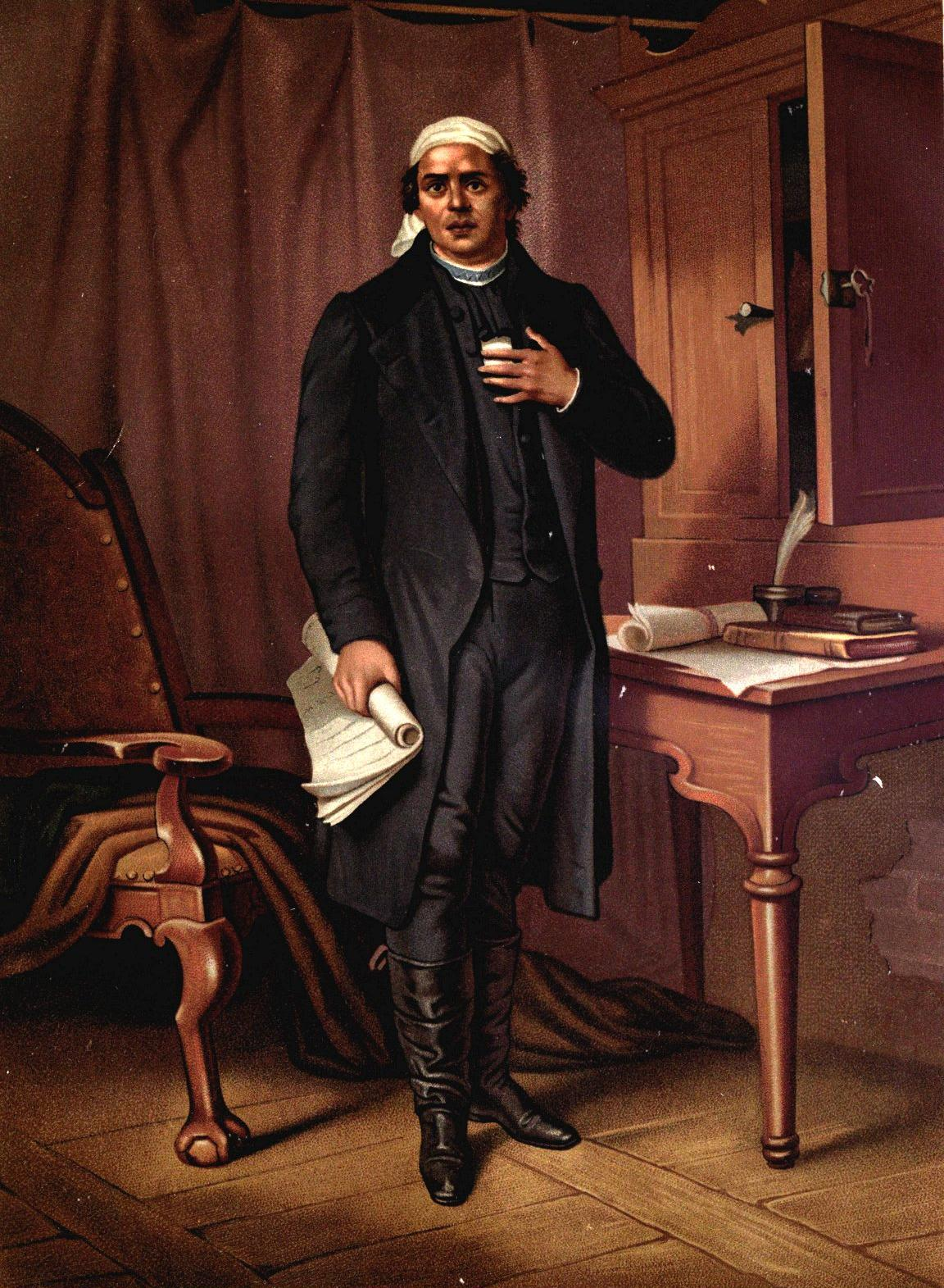
José María Morelos.

The Volunteers of Castile Regiment was reorganized in 1812, and 1,200 troops embarked on 16 March from Vigo on the transport frigates Carlota, Dido, Hermida, and Unión, escorted by the war frigate Diana. After a thirteen-day stopover in Puerto Rico, they arrived in Veracruz, in the Viceroyalty of New Spain, on 2 July. The troops’ difficult adaptation to the tropical climate caused numerous casualties from disease, prompting Colonel Hevia y Antayo, an Asturian, to move inland toward Xalapa without delay. However, harassment by insurgents forced them back to Veracruz. In 1813, the Regiment was assigned to garrison Mexico City and, months later, was sent to the Puebla de los Ángeles province until the end of 1814. That same year, King Ferdinand VII regained his freedom and returned to Spain, but “The Desired” soon disappointed many expectations, particularly regarding the American provinces, where he appointed military officers to political posts. This led to the repression of insurgents, with their leaders executed.

In January 1815, the only military engagement with the independence fighters occurred in Huatnatlan and Sepetépec. The Regiment participated in several actions in 1816: on 10 February in Ixtapa, 24 February in Riofrío, 21 March in San Salvador el Verde (a municipality in the state of Puebla), 29 March in Atlapexco, 23 June in San Marcos Ixquitlán, and 31 December in Tepexi de Rodríguez. It was a year filled with combat actions, and the following year was equally intense. In 1817, the insurgents captured several strongholds. The “Castilla” laid siege to them, recovering places such as Cerro Colorado, Puente del río Atoyac, Paso de Piedra, Barranca de Jamapa, and several others in the state of Puebla. From 21 February, when Tehuacán surrendered, to 20 December, they recaptured about eleven positions, some with bayonet assaults, as in the case of Barranca de Jamapa. 1818 saw similar military activity. During 1819 and 1820, the “Castilla” patrolled various districts, such as Olivara, Tierra Caliente, and Córdoba, without significant events.

==== Badge of Distinction ====
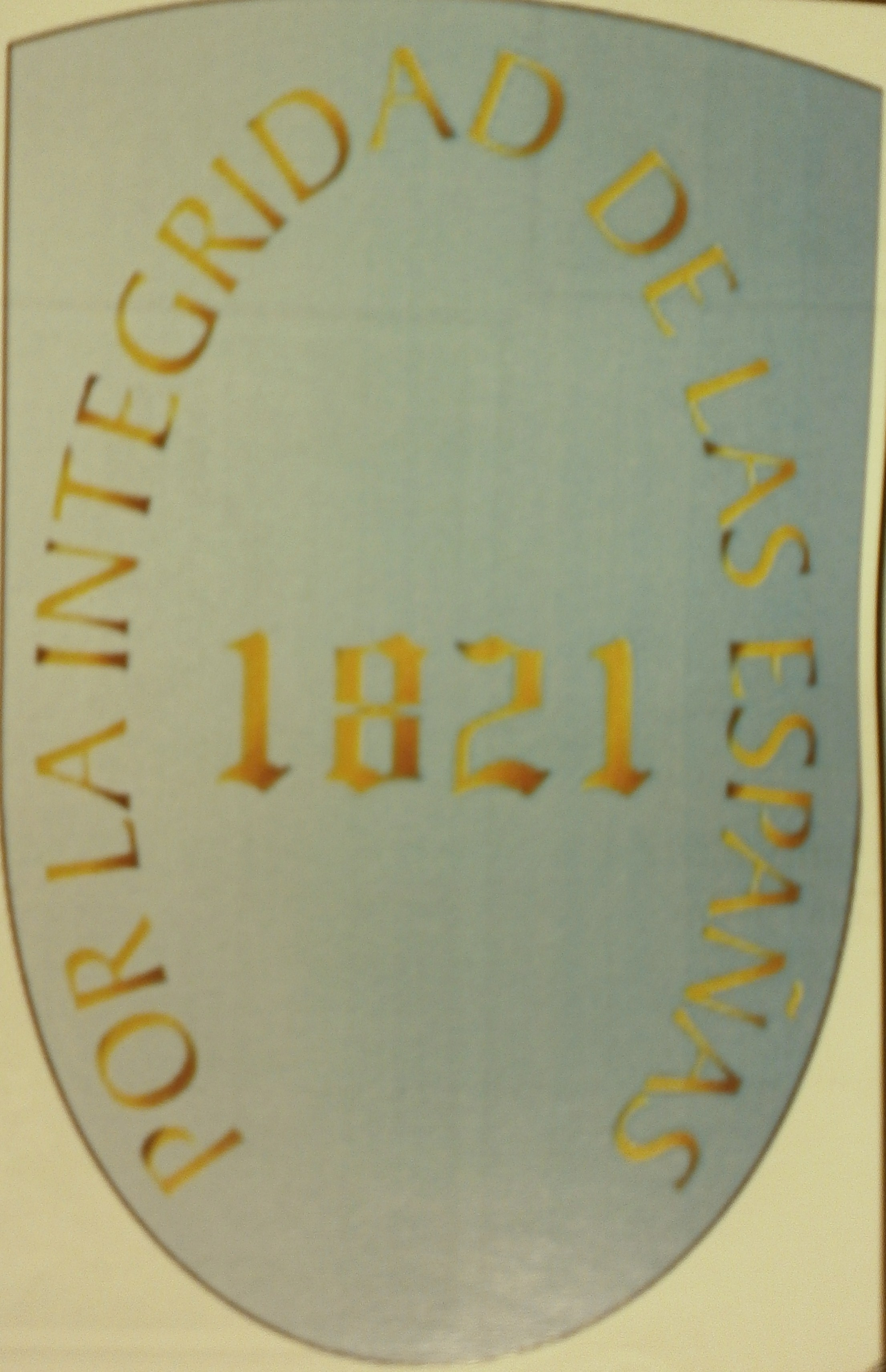
Badge of Distinction.

The situation in Mexico grew complicated, with escalating problems. Colonel Agustín de Iturbide, of aristocratic origin, joined the independence cause and promoted the Plan of Iguala, which, among other measures, promised to respect private property rights, protect the clergy from any dispossession, secure civil bureaucracy jobs, and ensure the independence of New Spain. The Crown's representative, Juan O'Donojú, signed the Plan without Spain's consent. The Volunteers of Castile Regiment faced this chaotic situation in the following months, holding firm on 22 April in Tepeaca, where it lost two captains, two lieutenants, and several soldiers. For this action, all members of the Regiment were awarded a distinction: a badge worn on the left arm, with a motto on a sky-blue field that reads: “For the Integrity of the Spains. Year 1821.”

==== Battles of Orizaba and Córdoba ====
The Volunteers of Castile entered Orizaba—formerly called Ahuilizapan in Nahuatl, meaning “place of joyful waters”—in the region of the great mountains, and the opposing side took refuge in Córdoba, where the street and house fighting resembled the sieges of Zaragoza. The Regiment suffered the loss of several commanders and officers, including its colonel (Francisco Hevia), prompting Lieutenant Colonel Blas del Castillo y Luna to take command. Given the heroism and great sacrifices of the Volunteers of Castile Regiment, the viceroy ordered the following note to be recorded in the Regiment's order book:

Indelible memory of the meritorious and valiant Colonel Don Francisco Hevia, of the Volunteers of Castile Regiment, expeditionary line soldier, heroically killed at the siege of Córdoba on 16 May 1821, defending the integrity of the Spains, its political constitution, and loyalty to his King, Lord Ferdinand VII.

==== Battle of Tacuba ====
Plan of Iguala

With the significant increase in Colonel Iturbide's military strength, as many Spaniards joined him to defend the Plan of Iguala and their interests, his forces advanced on the capital. The “Castilla” confronted them in Tacuba, under Colonel Francisco Bocelli. The Battle of Tacuba favored the Volunteers of Castile Regiment, which halted the independence forces. As a result, a colonel commanding other units sent a message to the field marshal regarding the “Castilla,” stating: “I must highlight to Your Excellency the units to which the determined and eager heroes belonged... they were the Castilla...”

=== Liberal Triennium ===
When General Rafael del Riego declared support for the Constitution of 1812 in 1820 with his troops, the Volunteers of Castile Regiment was stationed in La Coruña, the first city affected by the pronouncement. Due to conspiracies against the new government, the Regiment was sent to Aragon, Burgos, Navarre, and Palencia to manage increasingly tense situations between supporters and opponents of the Constitution.

Throughout the conflict, the Regiment did not operate as a cohesive unit, as each battalion was deployed to different locations. Its members fought in 1823 in Alcañiz, during the blockade of Mequinenza, and in the siege of Calatayud, defending the liberal cause.

=== Dissolution and refounding of the regiment ===
A secret envoy of the King negotiated the intervention of the Quadruple Alliance formed in 1815. A large army, known as the Hundred Thousand Sons of Saint Louis, led by Louis Antoine, Duke of Angoulême, crossed the Bidasoa River on 7 April 1823. The French intervention was highly controversial, as the populace still remembered the fight against the French during the War of Independence. Facing such a large army, the Volunteers of Castile retreated southward under General Francisco Ballesteros, who eventually capitulated. The Regiment's battalions were dissolved: the first in Simancas and the second in Cabra; the troops were discharged, and the commanders, officers, and non-commissioned officers underwent a form of “purge” to prove their loyalty to the King.

By a Royal Order of 29 March 1828, the Regiment was reborn as “15th Line Regiment of Castile,” comprising two battalions. Colonel Francisco Sanjuanena, who held the Badge of Distinction for escaping a French prisoner camp and fighting in Peru, was appointed for its reorganization. Despite not being involved in political events, his conduct during the Liberal Triennium was investigated to confirm his allegiance to the absolute monarchy. The refounding took place in Burgos, with the honor of maneuvering in the King's presence on 6 July of that year. The Regiment's band performed for the first time in Lugo in May 1829, and in September, the Regiment chose the Virgin of Carmel as its “Patroness.” With the creation of the new Princess Regiment (No. 4), the Volunteers of Castile Regiment was assigned number 16, which it retains to this day. The Princess Regiment was disbanded a century later, in 1936.

=== First Carlist War ===
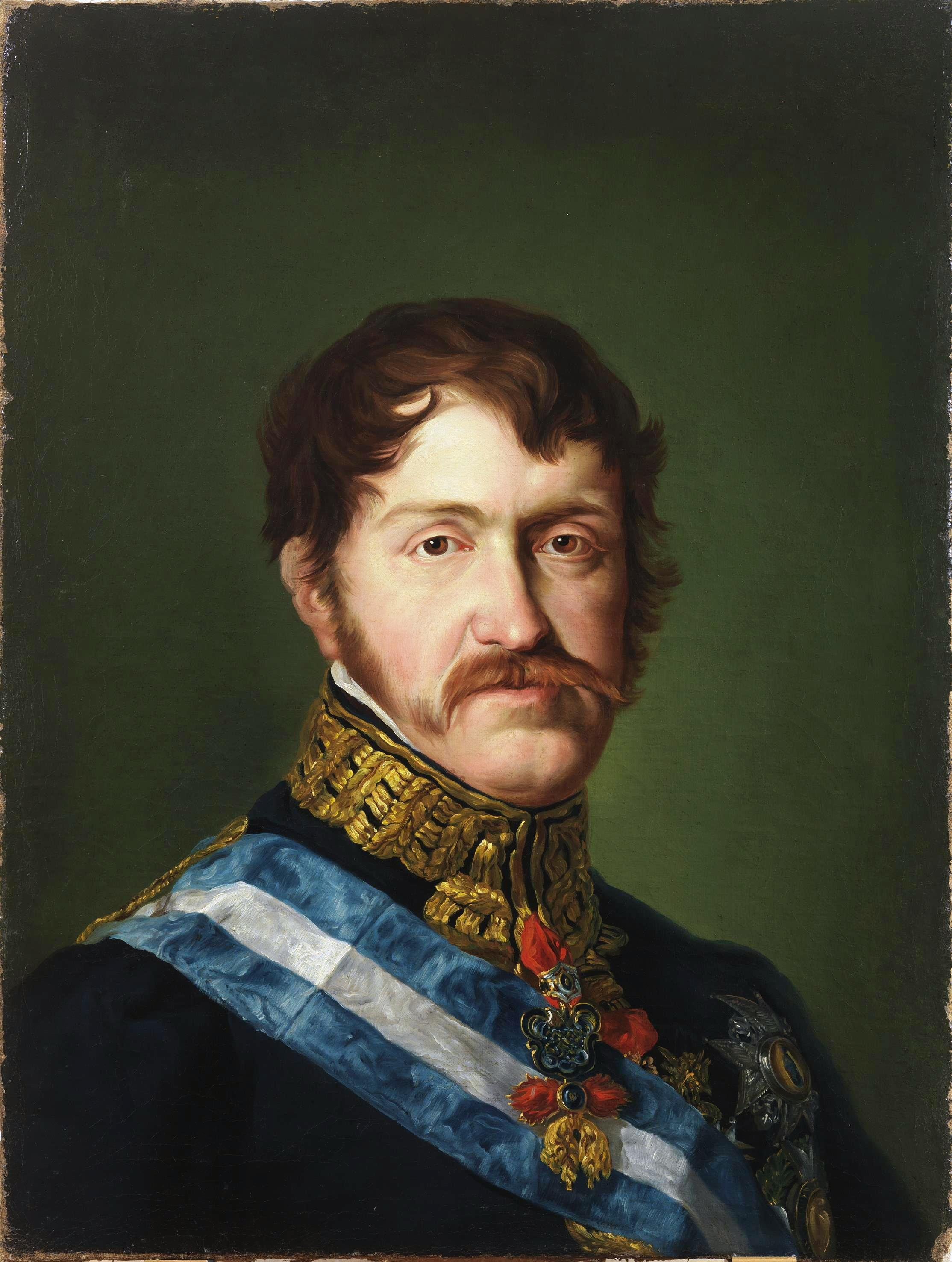
Infante Carlos María Isidro, self-proclaimed king as Carlos V

On 29 September 1833, King Ferdinand VII died, and Infante Carlos María Isidro de Borbón, who sought the throne over Isabella, Ferdinand's daughter, rallied significant support. By order of the Captain General of Galicia, the 16th Castilla Infantry Regiment, alongside the “Extremadura,” was tasked with apprehending the Infante. Had it succeeded, the Regiment could have altered the war's course, but in its incursions into northern Portugal, it only managed to surprise the pretender's entourage in Lardosa and seize his baggage. For this action, Colonel Sanjuanena was promoted to Field Marshal, and Lieutenant Colonel Miguel Mir de González took command of the Regiment.

Thereafter, the 16th Castilla Infantry Regiment fought on various fronts with mixed fortunes. With its battalions separated, they participated in numerous and varied battles: in Eulate under General Valdés, in Bilbao, where Tomás de Zumalacárregui died, in the Battle of Mendigorría, where, under General Luis Fernández de Córdova, they decisively defeated the Carlists, who suffered heavy losses in casualties and prisoners. In the Land of Pine Groves region of Soria, they pursued Father Merino and his lieutenant Juan de Leonardo. They also operated in Galicia, in the Sorian localities of Miñana and Luco, and were present at the battles of Arlabán, Santo Domingo de la Calzada, Los Arcos, Arróniz, Orrantía, and Bortedo, Asturias, Labacolla, Burón (Lugo), and took part in actions in Retuerta, Villanueva de Carazo, and Huerta de Rey in Burgos.

The 16th Castilla Infantry Regiment continued traversing Spanish territory until the signing of the Convention of Vergara. However, the conflict did not end there, as not all Carlist leaders agreed with the convention, including Ramón Cabrera, known as the “Tiger of the Maestrazgo.” In response, the “Castilla” fought battles in the quarries of Utrillas and achieved victory in the Battle of Arlabán. On 22 May 1840, the Regiment marched to the vicinity of Tremp in Lérida and to the stronghold of La Pobla de Segur, which were under Carlist attack. By late 1840, the entire Regiment was reunited in Catalonia, where the war's definitive end caught up with it, but challenges persisted. For various reasons, military and political leaders neglected to supply the army, which fell into a state of misery. Soldiers were reduced to half-rations, as the army's meager allocation passed through “the hands of greedy contractors who were not ashamed to speculate with the troops’ scant and sacred provisions.” During this period, the Queen’s Army lost over 140,000 men over seven years, equal to the number of troops standing when Ferdinand VII died.

=== Second Carlist War ===
After the First Carlist War, the 16th Castilla Infantry Regiment was stationed in various parts of Catalonia. Its activities focused on pursuing smugglers until 1844, when the newly created Civil Guard took over this role. During this period, the Regiment was commanded by Colonel Alcocer. These were turbulent years due to continuous uprisings, both liberal and absolutist, with up to forty-five rebellions in a short time. Consequently, the 16th Castilla Infantry Regiment was involved in some, such as those led by General Narváez, known as the “Sword of Loja,” and General Prim in mid-1843.

In August 1844, Colonel Ramón Nouvilas, a former aide to General Marcelino Oráa, was appointed head of the Regiment. He had been sentenced to death for participating in the events of 7 October 1841, when he attempted to forcibly separate General Espartero from Isabella II and her younger sister Luisa Fernanda, and fled to France. In January 1844, several insurrections occurred in southeastern Spain and the Galicia-Portugal border. The Regiment was sent there after a review by the deputy general of the Captaincy General of Galicia, who stated in his address:

Confident in the loyalty and discipline of the honorable and brave members of the Castilla, your Commander has no doubt that wherever the Regiment or part of it is present, rebellion attempts will be thwarted, and their audacious promoters severely punished.

Due to these circumstances, the Regiment was neglected, and its continuous transfers to different fronts left its regulatory documentation severely outdated. The Regiment's colonel reported this situation, and it was sent to Carabanchel, where it was reviewed by the War Minister. The year 1845 was calm for the Regiment, and on 16 July, the feast of the Virgin of Carmel, its patroness, the old white banners from the House of Bourbon era were blessed and replaced with new ones, one for each battalion.

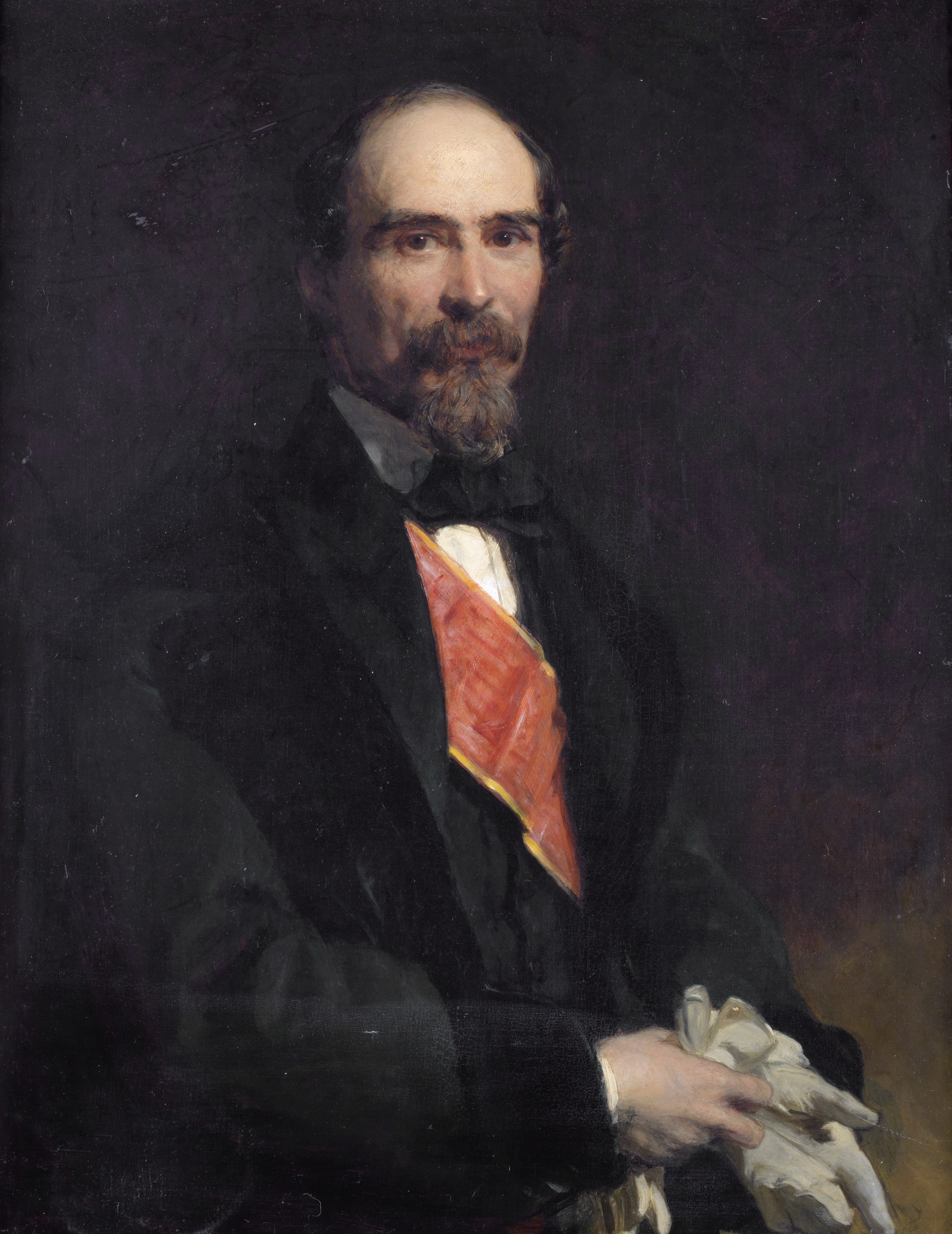
Portrait of Ramón Cabrera, the Tiger of the Maestrazgo

It was not long before the Regiment returned to arms. The failed “state marriages” between Isabella II and her sister Infanta Luisa Fernanda with the Duke of Aumale and the Duke of Montpensier, respectively, prompted the Carlists to go to war again. The start of hostilities is not precisely dated, but operations clearly took place in Catalonia. There, the “els matiners”, also called “trabucaires”, emerged. Initially, their groups were small and fragmented until Ramón Cabrera, known as the “Tiger of the Maestrazgo” and a great hero of the First Carlist War, arrived in Spain.

Due to the amnesty granted for the Queen's wedding, General Espartero returned to Spain and was appointed senator, which displeased General Narváez, who entered the Council of Ministers with a drawn saber, imposing a dictatorship that lasted over three years. Meanwhile, the 16th Castilla Infantry Regiment traversed Catalonia, engaging in guerrilla warfare against the followers of the “Tiger of the Maestrazgo.” In September 1848, Colonel Nouvilas was promoted to Field Marshal and later became War Minister under the First Spanish Republic. Colonel De La Rocha was appointed head of the Regiment.

The war against the guerrillas gradually took effect, with the “Castilla” being one of the regiments most engaged in actions. The guerrillas slowly lost support, especially in rural areas, and desertions to the “Castilla” and other government troops increased in pursuit of amnesty, which was granted on 8 June 1849. The Regiment was stationed in Barcelona and discharged soldiers from the 1843 and 1844 drafts. With Colonel de la Rocha's promotion to brigadier, this phase concluded.

=== Hispano–Moroccan War ===
After the Carlist conflict, the Regiment established its garrison in Barcelona. In August 1850, it was ordered to pursue the bandit “Baliarda,” who was killed in combat, and many of his followers were captured, earning the Regiment commendations. It continued its training and reorganization during the early 1850s. In early March 1851, Colonel de la Rocha submitted a request to Queen Isabella II for the 16th Castilla Infantry Regiment to be awarded the Fourth-Class Cross of Saint Ferdinand in recognition of its previous heroic actions. On 26 July 1852, the Marquis of Novaliches, following the Queen's instructions, confirmed the award from the Real Sitio de San Ildefonso. The ceremony took place on 10 October 1852, the Queen's birthday.

==== Vicálvaro Uprising or “Vicalvarada” ====
In early 1854, a major corruption scandal arose in the government regarding railway concession contracts. The Senate, in plenary session, voted against the law, prompting President Sartorius to dissolve the Cortes and launch a political persecution of senators. The opposition found support in General O’Donnell, who rebelled in Vicálvaro, near Madrid, with six cavalry regiments and the “Prince” Infantry Regiment, though their forces were insufficient to oppose the government loyalists. Several captains general joined the rebels, including Catalonia's. The 16th Castilla Infantry Regiment also joined the “Vicalvarada.” Consequently, the Queen called on Espartero to form a government in coalition with O’Donnell, effective 31 July 1854, marking the start of the Progressive Biennium. In August 1854, Colonel de la Rocha—who later became a minister of the Supreme Court of War and Navy and a State Councilor—was replaced as head of the 16th Castilla Infantry Regiment by Colonel Antonio Navazo de Teresa, a former Carlist who supported the Convention of Vergara.

==== March to the Colonies and Africa ====
In 1857, in collaboration with French colonial forces, Spain sent military expeditions to Mexico, Santo Domingo, Cochinchina, and Africa. On 2 October 1858, with Colonel Eduardo Aldanese y Urquidi as the new head, the 16th Castilla Infantry Regiment was ordered to prepare for embarkation to reinforce the Army of Africa. They embarked on 6 November on the French steamer Ville de Lyon, which took them to Cádiz. The then little-known railway transported them to Sanlúcar de Barrameda, where they awaited transfer to Africa.

==== Casus Belli ====
In Spain, there was no consensus on the looming war. These differences of opinion caused both politicians and the public to overlook serious national issues, uniting public sentiment against a common enemy: the Moors. The casus belli was as simple as the construction of a building, ordered by the Military Governor, to serve as a “Guard Post” to prevent convict workers’ desertions to the Moroccan zone. As expected, Moroccans crossed the dividing line on the night of 19 August, damaging the fortification. The Spanish government demanded that the Moroccan authorities apprehend and punish those responsible. Due to the delay in Moroccan response, Spain declared war on Morocco.

==== Start of operations ====
The troops of the second army corps, including the 16th Castilla Infantry Regiment, were reviewed by General O’Donnell on 18 November 1859. The Castilla arrived in Ceuta on 28 November aboard the steamer Brasil. The Regiment was assigned to the first demi-brigade of the First Division, under General Zavala, a future President of the Council of Ministers of Spain. The expeditionary army numbered about 35,000 men against the 45,000 of the King of Morocco. The greatest unknown regarding the enemy was its cavalry, which often adopted a crescent formation to envelop the enemy from both flanks.

The Regiment occupied the strongholds or redoubts of Francisco de Asís, Cisneros, and Isabel II; aware of their strategic importance, the African forces attacked them fiercely. In the early hours of 9 December 1859, a battle ensued between the North Africans, commanded by Muley-el-Abbas, brother of King Mohammed IV, and the Castilla No. 16 Battalion. The fighting escalated to bayonet charges, with Moroccan forces outnumbering the Spanish four to one. The Regiment's colonel, Eduardo Aldanese y Urquidi, was wounded by a bullet in the side, preventing him from continuing to command, but he was promoted in the field to brigadier by General Zavala. Artillery also played a significant role in the battle, as rifled-bore cannons were used for the first time. On 14 January, the Castilla No. 16 and Simancas Hunters Regiments captured the heights overlooking Tétouan, engaging in bayonet combat, during which Lieutenant Colonel Crespo was wounded.

==== Battle of Wad-Ras and peace signing ====
The Regiment continued fighting in February 1860 and participated in the Battle of Tétouan. The euphoria of this victory suggested an imminent peace, but the Moroccans deemed the cession of Tétouan unacceptable. While negotiations continued, the conflict persisted. In mid-March, the regiment fought fiercely on the Sierra Bermeja and Samsa fronts, launching bayonet assaults and capturing the heights of the Izmir River and Cabo Negro. In the early hours of 23 March 1860, operations continued toward Tangier, where the Battle of Wad-Ras resulted in the enemy's flight from the city. The Regiment was later evacuated on the steamer Velasco to San Sebastián. The campaign was short—lasting only four months—but extremely violent and grueling, with the Regiment suffering 44 combat deaths and 159 wounded, participating in 23 skirmishes and two battles. For its bravery, it was awarded 122 individual military crosses.

The peace signing was celebrated with joy by Spanish troops but went largely unnoticed in the Peninsula, even received with some indifference due to a lack of information. Nonetheless, the Spanish forces, including the 16th Castilla Infantry Regiment, fulfilled their superiors’ orders.

=== Third Carlist War ===
To recover from the African campaign's toll, the 16th Castilla Infantry Regiment was stationed in Vitoria-Gasteiz. Colonel Aldanese was succeeded by Colonel José de Andrade y Paino, a Badajoz native who had served as a lieutenant colonel in the Regiment in 1848 and aspired to lead it. He served as colonel for just over a year until 1846, when Colonel José Velarde took command, only to be replaced the same day he assumed the role by Colonel Melitón Andrés.

Due to tensions between General Prim, who sought a swift end to the monarchy, and O’Donnell and Narváez, his opponents, a failed uprising attempt occurred in Aranjuez, prompting the Regiment to be sent to Pamplona. Colonel Andrés was succeeded by Colonel José Oliva, followed by Ramón de la Torre y Bordons, a veteran of two Carlist wars, an expeditionary to Italy to defend Pope Pius XI, and a distinguished participant in the Hispano–Moroccan War, earning numerous decorations. In March 1868, he was replaced by Colonel de la Rosa at his own request. Next, Colonel José Cherif y Monroy, trained in the Carlist wars and a supporter of the Convention of Vergara, took command, having fought against former comrades in the capture of Miravete de la Sierra under O’Donnell.

In 1869, a new Constitution was proclaimed, initiating the search for a new king for Spain. Meanwhile, General Prim was appointed president. Amid these political shifts, the 16th Castilla Infantry Regiment transitioned from opposing the revolution to supporting it within days. In mid-October, it was sent to Valencia under its new colonel, José Faura y Serra, a Carlist war veteran wounded by a bullet in the shoulder. In mid-1870, he was succeeded by Colonel José Pierrat Iniesta.

==== Arrival of Amadeo of Savoy ====
On 30 December 1870, Amadeo of Savoy arrived at the port of Cartagena aboard the frigate Numancia. Upon disembarking, he learned of General Prim’s assassination in Madrid that same day. The two years of Amadeo I’s reign were so turbulent that three general elections and six governments occurred in that short period. The king himself said, “I am leaving,” and abdicated irrevocably, paving the way for the First Spanish Republic.

In the following years, the Regiment operated in Santander, Burgos, Soria, and Madrid. Among other battles, it stood out in a clash against Carlist groups in the Burgos village of Medina de Pomar, where, despite being vastly outnumbered, it rejected two surrender demands, declaring that “the Spanish Army never surrenders,” and forced the enemy to flee.

==== Proclamation of King Alfonso XII and Carlist defeat ====
Faced with the First Republic's severe challenges, compounded by colonial wars in Cuba and the Cantonalist movement in the eastern and southern regions such as Córdoba and Cartagena, some politicians and military leaders began considering a “Bourbon restoration” embodied by Alfonso XII. In 1874, the “Castilla” battalions served in Madrid, fought near the Cantabrian village of Rasines against the rebel group “Culebro,” and operated in Oviedo. On 18 April, Colonel Antonio Ziriza Sánchez, a significant figure from the Marine Infantry, joined the Regiment. He had participated in the Mexican expedition and served under Admiral Méndez Núñez in the sieges of Valparaíso and Callao.

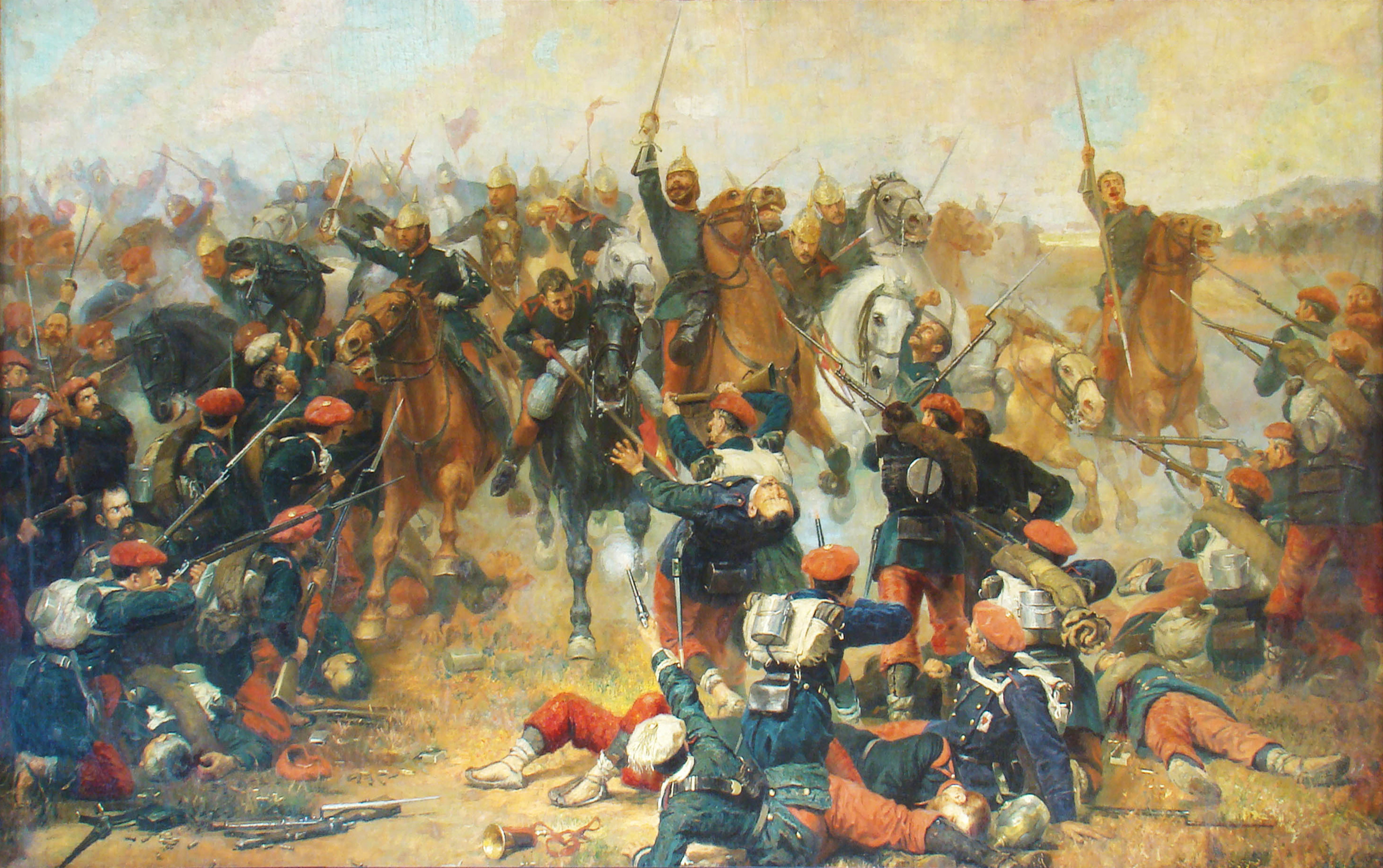
Battle of Treviño, by Víctor Morelli. Museum of the Cavalry Academy of Valladolid.

That year, the Castilla No. 16 also fought in the Battle of Somorrostro, in San Pedro Abanto—where hand-to-hand combat occurred—in the capture of Estella-Lizarra, at Monte Muru, in Irun, and more. It later embarked from the port of Pasajes to Santander, nearly sinking in a storm. On 29 December 1874, General Martínez Campos proclaimed Alfonso XII as king in Sagunto, who appointed Cánovas del Castillo as the first president of the Restoration Government. On 23 January 1875, Alfonso XII reviewed 40,000 soldiers of all branches in Peralta, Navarre, including the 16th Castilla Infantry Regiment. In July, the Regiment moved to Miranda de Ebro and soon participated in the Battle of Tulillo. It marched to Sagunto and fought in the Battle of Treviño, earning high praise from General Quesada. In November, it headed to Vitoria and took part in the Battle of Peñacerrada, capturing all enemy defenses, including the San León Fort.

In early 1875, the Castilla Regiment No. 16 captured the Miravalles hill with a bayonet assault. The year 1875 ended with the regiment stationed in La Rioja, quartered in Logroño, and later moving to Haro. On January 26, it departed for Vitoria, and on January 30, it dislodged enemy forces from positions as challenging as those on Mount Gangorri with another bayonet assault. On February 5, it attacked and seized Abadiano, and on February 16, the Castilla Regiment No. 16 officially honored King Alfonso XII in Bergara. The regiment concluded this period under the command of Colonel Pascual de la Calle y Guibert. The war ended definitively when Carlos María de Borbón y Austria-Este, self-styled Carlos VII, crossed the border into France with his officers, who, in a gesture of protest, broke their swords against the ground.

=== Badajoz ===
When the dynastic war ended, the Castilla Regiment No. 16 was stationed in Vitoria. On July 16, 1876, the feast day of the Virgin of Carmel, the regiment's patroness, new flags acquired for the battalions were blessed and presented. From this date until 1883, the Castilla No. 16 conducted various organizational and logistical operations for both itself and other regiments, companies, and units. Some of its officers participated in training courses and military exercises to refine techniques and tactics, including the exercise known as “Water, Sand, and Axe,” held in the fields of Aranguir alongside other infantry, cavalry, and artillery regiments. The regiment also responded to unforeseen missions caused by natural disasters, providing aid to affected civilians.

Among its missions was the deployment of 20% of its personnel to the Ten Years' War. The regiment also assisted in the compilation of the population census conducted in late 1877. Following a new army reorganization, twenty new battalions were created, and the merger of the Seville No. 3 and Málaga No. 23 reserve battalions formed the Covadonga Infantry Regiment No. 41, initially quartered in Badajoz under the command of Colonel Pedro Ruiz Martínez.

Due to regulations that displeased the military, republicans led by Manuel Ruiz Zorrilla formed a secret organization called the ARM (Republican Military Association), which attracted many disgruntled soldiers. In Badajoz, the cavalry, artillery, and the Covadonga Infantry Regiment No. 41 joined this movement. For the uprising to succeed, various garrisons across the country would have needed to participate, but within hours, conflicting actions emerged. When the Covadonga Regiment realized it was isolated, it was too late. Over 900 officers and soldiers fled to Portugal, while General Blanco, appointed Captain General of Extremadura, secured the city without bloodshed. A court-martial convicted the rebels, with some sentenced to death, though these penalties were later commuted to imprisonment in military fortresses.

While stationed in Leganés, the Castilla No. 16 received a Royal Order on December 10, 1883, transferring it to Badajoz. The regiment departed on December 16, taking six days to organize the railway transfer. The first forces arrived in Badajoz the following day and occupied the San Francisco el Grande barracks, which was vacant following the dissolution of the Covadonga Regiment No. 41. From December 17, 1883, the Castilla Infantry Regiment No. 16 would be tied to the city of Badajoz for over a century. Many generations of Extremadurans, particularly from Badajoz, served in its ranks, as recruits were typically assigned to the nearest regiments.

=== Campaign of 1898 ===
Following the 1812 Constitution, most convents and monasteries in Spain, including those in Badajoz, were converted into barracks, with their gardens turned into courtyards or wastelands. The Revolution of 1868, known as “La Gloriosa,” expelled the few remaining religious orders from Badajoz. Consequently, the San Francisco convent, initially used as a cemetery, became a barracks, housing troops from December 17, 1883. By early 1884, the entire regiment was quartered in the former Franciscan convent and its adjacent garden, named San Francisco el Grande barracks. The garden later became the current San Francisco promenade, a rectangular park with a central bandstand for concerts and popular music, serving as a recreational hub for postwar youth for decades.

==== Tragedy at the Alcudia River Bridge ====
Drawings by Manuel Alcázar for La Ilustración Española y Americana illustrating the incident

In April 1884, the Castilla No. 16 suffered more casualties from one event than from many of the battles it fought. Veterans discharged from the 1881 conscription began their return journey by railway on Sunday, April 27. At kilometer 279 of the Madrid-Badajoz line, at 4:00 a.m., while crossing the three-pillar metal bridge over the Alcudia River, the structure collapsed, plunging the train into the river from a height of about eight meters. This disaster claimed the lives of fifty-two soldiers. Funerals and ceremonies honoring the deceased were held in Badajoz, attended by ecclesiastical, political, and military authorities, as well as many local residents. Initiatives were also undertaken to raise funds for the families of the fallen soldiers, most of whom were of modest means. The complete list of the deceased, along with their ranks and places of origin, is recorded in the regiment's record books.

==== Death of Alfonso XII and birth of Alfonso XIII ====
On November 25, 1885, King Alfonso XII died of tuberculosis, and Maria Christina of Austria, his second wife, was appointed regent while pregnant, hoping for a male heir for obvious succession reasons. On May 17, 1886, Queen Regent Maria Christina gave birth to a son, who, at sixteen, was proclaimed King Alfonso XIII. During this period, the regiment carried out its duties, with some companies stationed in Olivenza, Mérida, and Cáceres. The regiment's colonel, Leonardo Fernández Ruiz, who began as a private, rose to the rank of colonel after forty years of service. Promoted from lieutenant colonel during the Third Carlist War, where he was wounded and honored with the promotion, he retired in late March 1887. He was remembered as the commander when the regiment arrived in Badajoz. He was succeeded by Colonels Manuel Ortega y Sánchez-Muñoz, José Márquez Torres, and Joaquín Gutiérrez Villuendas. Colonel Márquez was promoted for repelling the cantonalist insurgents in a fierce battle and for capturing a significant amount of arms and ammunition. He served seventeen years in the rank until his promotion to brigadier general in 1890.

==== Visit of the Portuguese Royals and Proclamation of the Patroness of the Spanish Infantry ====
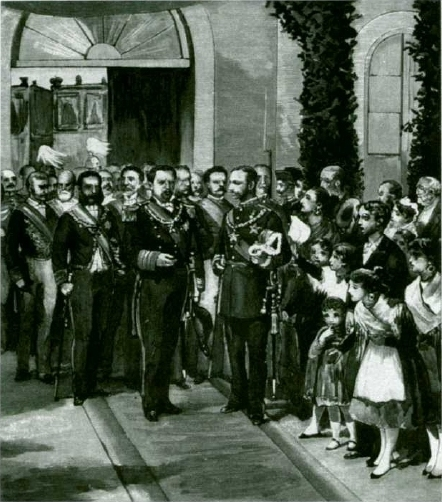
The King of Portugal visiting Valencia de Alcántara

In 1892, the fourth centenary of the Discovery of America was celebrated with great solemnity by the regiment and the city of Badajoz. On November 7, the Minister of War ordered a company from the regiment to travel to Valencia de Alcántara to render honors to the Portuguese royals beginning their visit to Spain. The 4th Company of the 1st Battalion was tasked with this duty. Notably, this company included Lieutenant Francisco Neila Ciria, who years later received the Laureate Cross of Saint Ferdinand for holding the siege and defense of Cascorro, a Cuban locality, against insurgent forces for thirteen days, alongside soldier Eloy Gonzalo, who also distinguished himself in combat. Shortly after, on November 12, 1892, a Royal Order published in the Official Gazette No. 248 declared the Immaculate Conception the sole patroness of the Spanish Infantry.

==== Events in Morocco ====
Due to Colonel Gutiérrez's promotion on March 11, 1893, Francisco Salinero Bellver was appointed the new colonel. That same year, Spain sought to implement one of the protocols of the Treaty of Wad Ras, or peace treaty with Morocco, dated April 26, 1860, which granted Spain a larger area near Melilla. Fortification began near a Berber cemetery, which provoked hostility from the locals, who harassed the workers and defending troops. Diplomatic talks between the two countries attempted to resolve the conflict, but the attacks persisted until the Minister of War sent 22,000 soldiers to Melilla under General Arsenio Martínez Campos, prompting the Berbers to accept the new boundaries. In the Melilla events, Lieutenant Miguel Primo de Rivera distinguished himself, earning the Laureate Cross of Saint Ferdinand that year. By late 1893, the reservists of Castilla No. 16 were discharged but continued serving in the regiment in Badajoz.

==== First centenary of the regiment and the Cuban War ====
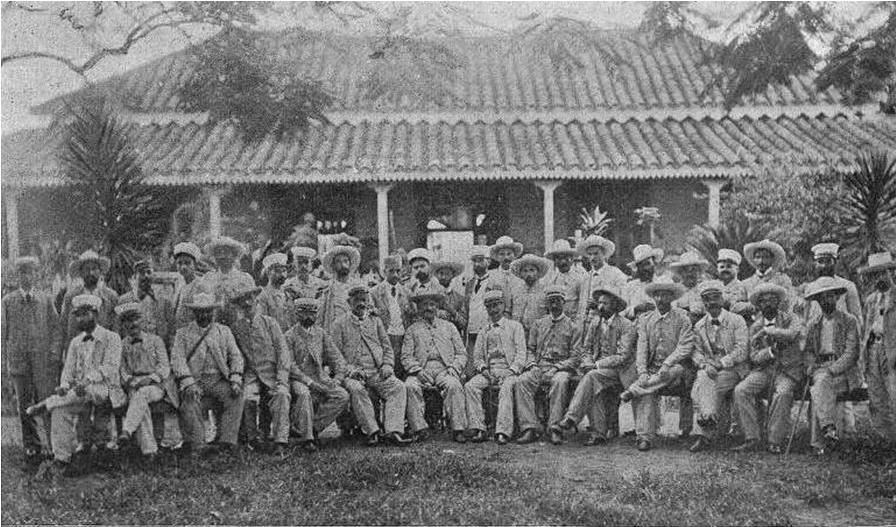
Officers of the Castilla No. 16 expeditionary force in Cuba

King Alfonso XII attended military maneuvers conducted by the regiment and other units from February 19 to 24, 1894, at the Altos de Galache, likely near Santa Engracia, where he also inaugurated an agricultural farm during a visit to Badajoz. In July 1894, the Castilla Infantry Regiment No. 16 celebrated its first centenary. Following the promotion of the regiment's colonel to brigadier general, Colonel Gabriel Gelabert Vallecillo took command.

On February 24, 1895, Cuban revolutionary José Martí ordered an uprising in Baire, sparking the Cuban War of Independence. The Castilla No. 16 contributed to forming the first units destined for Cuba. The events in the Antilles caused great concern in Spain, and on October 18, 1895, a Royal Order published in the Official Gazette No. 232, issued by the Queen Regent on behalf of the King, ordered twenty battalions to be sent to Cuba in a state of war. The Castilla No. 16 organized one of these expeditionary battalions, which departed Badajoz for Cádiz by railway on November 23, under Colonel Gabriel Gelabert Vallecillo, and embarked on the steamship Ciudad de Cádiz the next day. The remaining staff and the 2nd Battalion stayed in Badajoz.

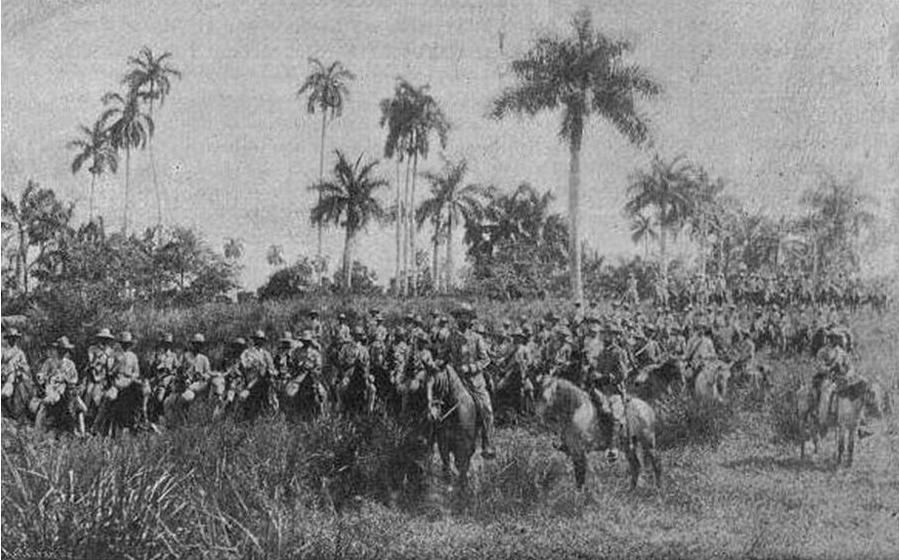
Troops of the Castilla No. 16 expeditionary force in Cuba

The Cuban insurgents, with decisive support from the United States, waged a relentless war, executing collaborators and sympathizers of Spain and its army. The Spanish government sent General Martínez Campos, known for his conciliatory approach, but upon assessing the situation, he requested relief and recommended Majorcan General Valeriano Weyler, whom he deemed more suitable for this type of warfare.

The Castilla No. 16 expeditionary battalion underwent three days of acclimatization before moving by railway to Cienfuegos and Santa Clara. The first clash with revolutionaries occurred on January 14, 1896. On April 7, a detachment of Castilla No. 16 soldiers, after enduring an eighteen-day siege, repelled forces led by insurgent leader Antonio Maceo, earning praise from General Weyler for their bravery. Clashes with insurgents were constant at San Bartolo hills, Toro hill, Ceja de Herradura, Guadalcanal, Consolación del Sur, and Lomas de Descanso. In the latter, Colonel Gelabert was wounded in the right femur, promoted to brigadier general, and retired to Valencia de Alcántara, where he died from his war injuries.

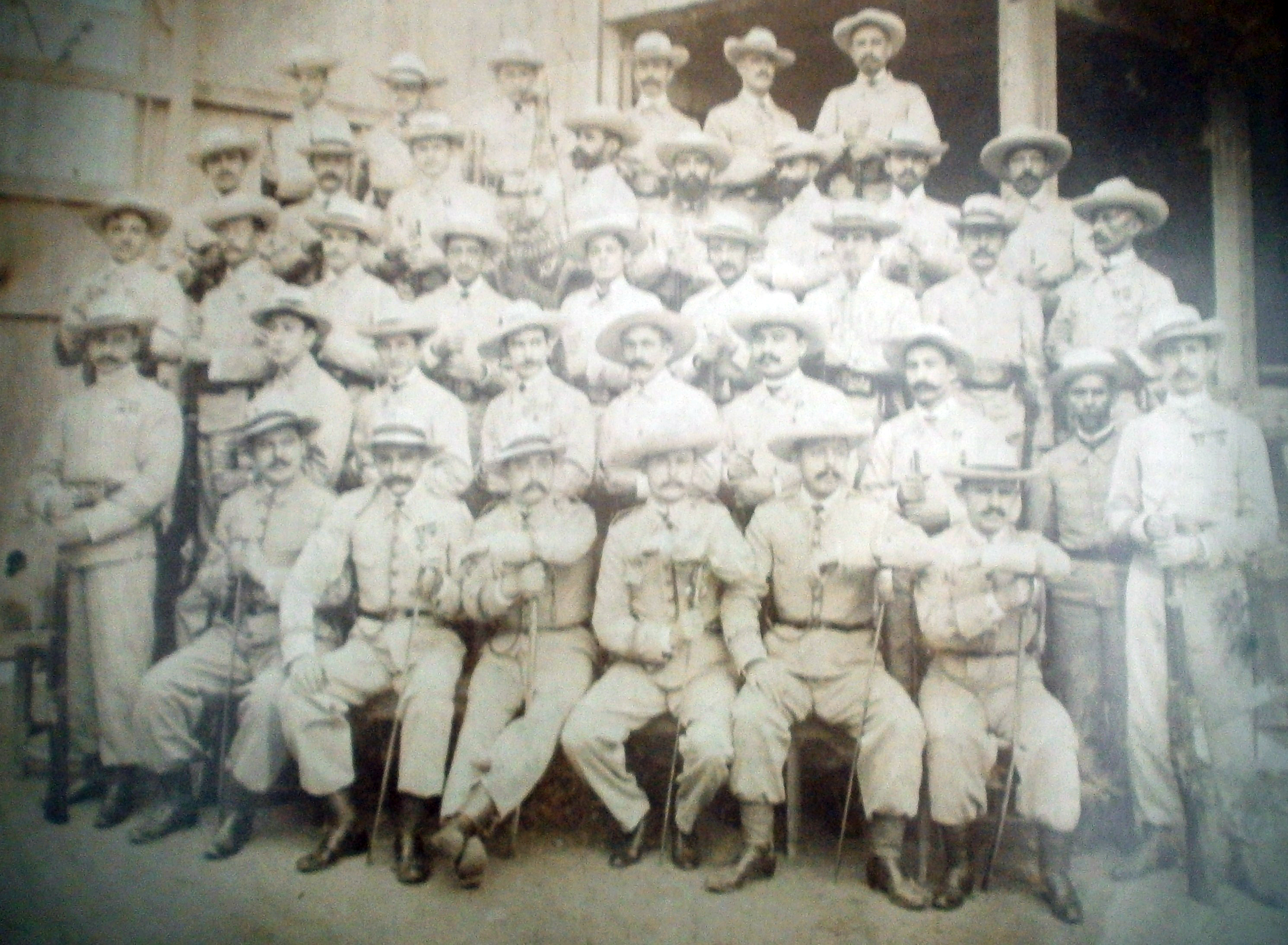
Ten Years' War in Cuba. In the second row, standing, fourth from the left, Bernardino Rovira, father of the first commander of the RIMZ Castilla No. 16

On February 10, 1896, General Weyler arrived to assume the Captaincy General and immediately issued decrees to reorganize the army. Alongside the Queen's Battalion, the Castilla No. 16, with cavalry and some artillery, formed a column under Colonel Cándido Hernández de Velasco, a veteran of Cuban combat, and marched to Pinar del Río. They dispersed separatists at Arroyo de San Felipe, Rosario, and Charnuzo on July 27, and two days later defeated Perico Belén's group, destroying enemy camps and seizing weapons and animals, as noted by General Weyler. From August 6 to 11, 1896, the regiment surprised insurgents camped at Cruces and Rivera and engaged in combat with Payaso, Perico Belén, and Rodolfo's groups at Acrimonias, Punta de Palmas, and Caobilla. Days later, they encountered them crossing the Isabela River. On September 27, one of the fiercest battles of the campaign occurred at Tumbas de Toriño, prompting General Weyler to telegraph the Minister of War, praising the troops’ “intrepidity and gallantry.”

October 9, 1896, marked a memorable day for the Castilla No. 16: while General Adolfo Jiménez Castellanos’s column was besieged by 5,000 mambises led by insurgents Máximo Gómez and Calixto García, soldier Eloy Gonzalo charged the enemy with a can of gasoline tied to his body, freeing his besieged comrades and earning the Laureate Cross of Saint Ferdinand. Captain Neila’s feat is also noteworthy: under siege and facing repeated surrender demands from the insurgents, he declared on behalf of his forces, “All my troops are ready to defend themselves and die rather than surrender their arms and betray their military honor.”

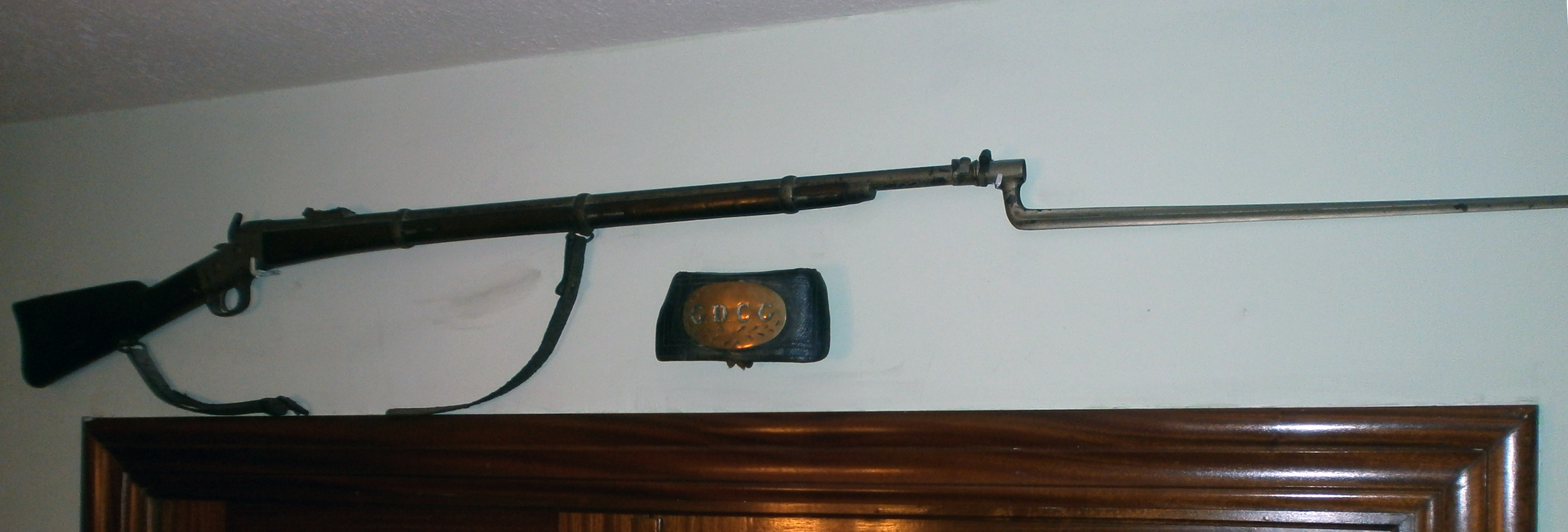
Remington rifle from the Cuban War of 1868–1878, belonging to Bernardino Rovira, with bayonet and cartridge belt

Due to Colonel Hernández de Velasco's promotion, Lieutenant Colonel Recio took command of the Castilla No. 16 expeditionary battalion. Its extensive operations across the island earned Colonel Recio the confidence of General Weyler, who personally took command of the battalion. Colonel Recio returned to the peninsula to recover from an illness and remained in Badajoz as the regiment's commander. During this period, the controversial explosion and sinking of the U.S. battleship Maine occurred. The ship had docked in Havana on January 25, 1898, and exploded three weeks later, killing 266 American sailors. The United States blamed Spain, declaring war. Defeated militarily by the U.S. army, Spain signed the Treaty of Paris on December 10, 1898, recognizing the loss of its last overseas colonies. The Castilla No. 16 expeditionary battalion was repatriated on December 21 and arrived in Cádiz on January 6, 1899. On May 1, General Adolfo Jiménez Castellanos lowered the Spanish flag for the last time at the Castillo de los Tres Reyes Magos del Morro in Havana.

== Actions in the early 20th century ==
In 1900, the Castilla No. 16 conducted humanitarian efforts, such as preventing the spread of the bubonic plague from Portugal and restricting the movement of people and animals along the Portuguese-Extremaduran border. The regiment sent a company to Cáceres, Trujillo, Almoharín, and Hornachos, where they assisted farmers in eradicating a locust plague. They later moved to Alcántara, Aliseda, Villar del Rey, and Arroyomolinos, returning to Badajoz by late July 1900. These efforts were balanced with regular training.

=== New flags ===
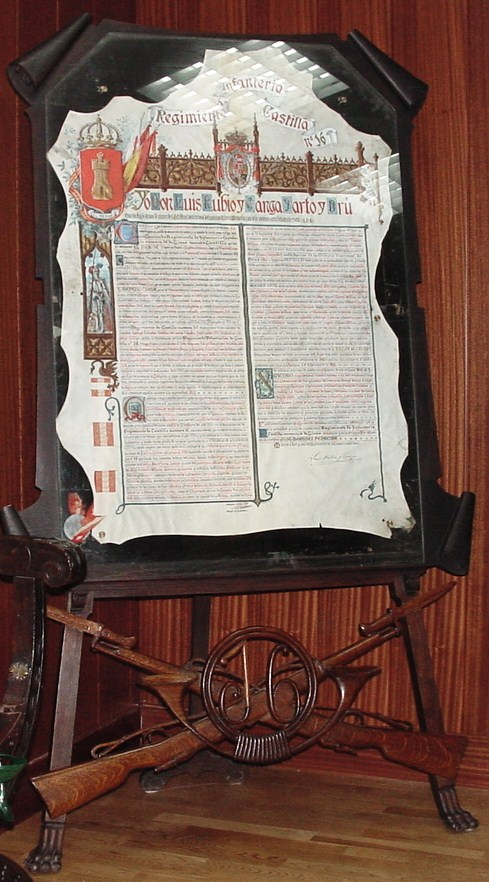
Scroll of the regiment's charter

On May 7, 1902, new flags were blessed, and the two old banners used in the Cuban campaigns were retired to the Infantry Museum. Colonel Domingo Recio and Lieutenant Colonel Vicente Ambel received the new flags. The regiment's charter, preserved in the flag and banner room of the RIMZ Castilla No. 16 in Bótoa, near Badajoz, dated 1912, describes the regimental coat of arms: “… the Coat of Arms consists of a quarter of this form: on a gules background, a golden castle with a keep, surmounted by a Royal Crown…” The parchment is headed by "Don Luis Rubio y Canga Yarto y Brú," who was responsible for drafting and ordering its implementation.

=== Royal events ===
To celebrate King Alfonso XIII’s coronation, the Castilla No. 16, alongside the Gravelinas and Villarrobledo Cavalry regiments, participated in a grand military parade near the glacis adjacent to Puerta del Pilar. On April 24, 1905, a Royal Order tasked the regiment with lining the streets during King Alfonso XIII's visit to Badajoz the following day. Its members lined the route from Menacho Street to the cathedral and later paraded in honor of the monarch. On March 9, 1906, a Royal Decree published in the Official Gazette No. 54 appointed King Carlos I of Portugal as honorary colonel of the regiment, stating:

:ROYAL DECREE

Wishing to give a high testimony of my sincere friendship and affectionate regard to His Most Faithful Majesty Don Carlos I, King of Portugal:

I hereby appoint him Honorary Colonel of the Castilla Infantry Regiment No. 16.

Issued in San Sebastián, on March 9, 1906.

Alfonso.

The Minister of War: Agustín Luque

On March 15, a company from the regiment marched to the Valencia de Alcántara railway station to render honors during the passage of the Portuguese royals. On March 11, 1907, Colonel Vicente Ambel Cárdenas assumed command due to his predecessor's promotion. In early 1909, King Manuel II of Portugal was named honorary colonel, replacing King Carlos I, who had been assassinated eleven months earlier. In mid-February, King Alfonso XIII passed through Badajoz again, returning from a visit to Portugal where he met the new Portuguese king in Villaviciosa, with part of the regiment rendering honors to the monarchs.

=== Activities until the start of the Moroccan War ===
To honor the remains of Lieutenant Jacinto Ruiz y Mendoza during their transfer to Madrid, a company from the regiment marched to Trujillo on March 10, 1909, returning shortly after. A handful of earth from his coffin is preserved in a small urn, encased in a glass and wooden container, stored in the RIMZ Castilla No. 16's Banner Room. Lieutenant Ruiz was a hero in the war against the French, and his remains rest alongside those of Captains Daoíz and Velarde.

By mid-1909, tensions with Kabyles near Spanish possessions in North Africa escalated, as they rejected Spanish authority and claimed the lands. In these clashes, Corporal Luis Noval Ferrao died, posthumously awarded the Laureate Cross of Saint Ferdinand. By the end of the year, the area had been pacified at a high cost of 3,000 dead Spanish soldiers.

A battalion under Lieutenant Colonel Neila traveled to Madrid in 1912 to line part of the route for the Portuguese King Manuel II’s visit to the capital and to render farewell honors at the Delicias Station on November 12. The regiment ended the year stationed in Badajoz, though its San Fernando and Saboya regiments volunteered for Melilla. On March 9, 1912, Colonel José Martínez Pedreira took command. To attend the centenary of the Cortes of Cádiz, a Royal Order directed all units with the San Fernando Tie on their flags and standards to participate, so the Castilla No. 16 sent a delegation led by Lieutenant Colonel Neila.

The regiment ended 1912 quartered in Badajoz and began 1914 with part of the regiment in Cáceres, where Colonel Manuel Elías Prats assumed command on January 20. In early July, the Military Aeronautics Service visited Badajoz for exercises, received by a regimental delegation. The service took the first high-quality aerial photographs of Badajoz, clearly showing the Castilla No. 16 barracks.

== Moroccan War ==
From 1915 to 1918, no notable events occurred except for a visit to Badajoz by Infanta of Spain and Princess of Asturias Isabel, sister of Alfonso XIII, popularly known as “La Chata.” The 16th Castilla Infantry Regiment rendered ceremonial honors with a company, flag, and band. On September 10, 1918, Colonel Francisco Sosa Arbelo took command due to his predecessor's promotion. No records of operations or internal events exist from 1920 to 1931, but in October 1920, Colonel Sosa was assigned to another regiment, replaced by Colonel Luis Navarro y Alonso de Celada. Meanwhile, highly impregnable areas persisted in the Spanish Protectorate in Morocco, spanning from the Moulouya River, east of Melilla—the ancient Rusadir—along the Mediterranean coast and the Rif mountains to the Atlantic city of Larache.

=== Disaster of Annual ===
General Dámaso Berenguer was appointed High Commissioner, devising a plan to establish Spanish control in the region. He achieved his goals, capturing the “holy city” of Chefchaouen in 1920. Months later, General Manuel Fernández Silvestre advanced to meet Berenguer's troops but failed to secure his rear, a vulnerability exploited by Rifian forces. Combined with uprisings by Abd el-Krim’s Kabyles, desertions by indigenous troops, and their superior knowledge of the terrain, Spanish forces were harassed and isolated in Annual. The Battle of Annual, one of Spain's worst military defeats, took place from July 22, 1921.

=== Arrival of the expeditionary battalion of the 16th Castilla Regiment in Africa ===
Troops were immediately dispatched from the peninsula, including the first battalion of the Castilla Infantry Regiment No. 16, which embarked on the steamship Atlante and arrived in the operational zone on July 25, 1921, the feast of James the Great, under Lieutenant Colonel Baldomero Álvarez Agudo. Soon after, the Gravelinas expeditionary battalion marched to Melilla. On August 4, the Captain General of the 1st Military Region, Miguel Primo de Rivera, issued a proclamation for all units to publish in their Order Bulletins. He lamented the severity of the events and the “disorderly and panicked” retreat, urging units to prevent such occurrences in the future.

Despite reluctance from the Central Government and politicians, additional forces arrived in Melilla, though insufficient in number and lacking combat experience. Only Millán Astray’s legionaries from Ceuta had prior combat experience. In August, the first casualty of the Castilla No. 16 expeditionary battalion was Corporal Juan Montes of the 1st Company, followed by soldier José Cano García in September. On October 10, preparations were made to capture Mount Gurugu, with the Castilla No. 16 forming a column with other units under Colonel Riquelme. The regiment distinguished itself in the battles of Casabona and Nador. Spanish forces captured this key position and advanced to the strategic Moulouya and Kert rivers, the former marking the border with the French protectorate and the latter enabling westward progress. Before this, Mount Arruit, holding many Spanish prisoners, was captured. Abd el-Krim demanded four million pesetas for their release, but Spanish military leaders, believing this would fund rearmament, opted for a forceful liberation. Mount Arruit was taken without major issues, validating the Africanists’ approach.

=== Return of the 16th Castilla Regiment Expeditionary Battalion to Badajoz ===
Due to the success of the Spanish troops' advances, the High Commissioner decided to repatriate one battalion from each contributing city. Thus, the Castilla No. 16 expeditionary battalion returned in 1922, while the Gravelinas No. 41 remained until October. In May 1922, Colonel Juan Urbano Palma, a veteran of the Cuban War of Independence, assumed command. On December 13, 1923, General Primo de Rivera took power, and in Badajoz, the Castilla No. 16 awaited clear orders amid conflicting reports. The regiment's memorial notes that the second battalion was sent to Ceuta in 1924, lifting the siege of Solano, advancing to the Martín River, and then to Tétouan and Zinal, where it achieved its objectives, earning congratulations from General Primo de Rivera.

In Badajoz, Colonel Pedro Calderón Delgado took command on November 15, 1924. By the end of the year, Major Musician Bonifacio Gil and Captain José Castillo composed the music and lyrics for the Castilla Hymn, still frequently sung in the unit's parade ground. Bonifacio Gil began his military career as a drummer in the La Lealtad Regiment in Burgos. He then served as a first-class musician in the Zamora Regiment in Ferrol and rose to the rank of Commander/Director of Music. In 1925, the African expeditionary battalion returned to Badajoz, with only one company remaining in the North African operational zone. The war neared its end, and in July 1925, a Franco-Spanish cooperation treaty facilitated the Alhucemas landing, hastening the war's conclusion with French naval support. In Badajoz, the regiment continued to train soldiers and attend required events. On September 15, 1925, Colonel Federico Fernández Sánchez Caro, familiar with the Badajoz military post, took command.

=== Transfer to Menacho Headquarters ===
On November 29, 1925, an order was received to transfer the Gravelinas Regiment No. 41 to the new General Menacho barracks, the first extramural barracks in Badajoz, located at the intersection of the Olivenza and Valverde de Leganés roads, near the glacis of Puerta del Pilar. Six years later, in 1931, the 16th Castilla Infantry Regiment occupied these barracks. The regiment then comprised three battalions: the first two had three rifle companies and one machine-gun company, while the third had four rifle battalions. It was part of the Second Division, First Infantry Brigade, commanded by General Manuel Burguete Lana.

== Spanish Civil War ==
The period of military, social, and political conflicts in Spain from July 18, 1936, when a group of military officers and their troops rebelled against the Republican government, to April 1, 1939, when General Francisco Franco declared victory, is known as the Spanish Civil War and affected the Castilla Infantry Regiment No. 16, as it did the rest of the armed forces.

=== Preceding years: 1930 to 1936 ===
In 1930, the Castilla No. 16 was still stationed at the San Francisco el Grande barracks in Badajoz, where services and facilities were being installed to improve soldiers’ welfare. Tactical training continued in the glacis opposite Puerta del Pilar and at the Cañada de Sancha Brava, 4 km from Badajoz, which offered ideal conditions for shooting exercises. Politically, Dámaso Berenguer, former High Commissioner of Spain in Morocco, was appointed head of the new government after the fall of Miguel Primo de Rivera. Shortly after celebrating the feast of the patroness, the Immaculate Conception, between December 12 and 15, 1930, two republican uprisings occurred in Jaca and the Cuatro Vientos airbase in Madrid. Both failed, but they impacted the Castilla No. 16, as the Badajoz military governor, General Alfredo Coronel Cubría, followed orders from the Captaincy General of the 1st Military Region and declared a state of war. A section of the Castilla No. 16 went to the Military Government building to publicly read the received proclamation. In 1931, King Alfonso XIII went into exile to avoid confrontations among Spaniards, facilitating the proclamation of the Second Spanish Republic on April 14.

Days later, Colonel Joaquín Guerra Zagala assumed command, replacing Federico Fernández Sánchez-Caro, who had retired after serving in the Cuban War of Independence, where he was wounded and awarded the Medal for Sufferings for the Homeland. The new colonel, a veteran of the 1898 campaign and the Rif War, took command by Order of May 26, 1931, but served briefly due to the army restructuring by the Second Republic's government. In 1931, the 16th Castilla Regiment continued to serve in the Ocaña prison, the San Gabriel powder magazine, and the San Cristóbal Fort, the latter two located in Badajoz.

By government order of May 26, published in the Official Gazette No. 115, the Castilla No. 16 and Gravelinas No. 41 regiments merged into the Line Infantry Regiment No. 16, organized into two battalions under Colonel Adolfo Roca Lafuente. The new Minister of War, Manuel Azaña, introduced reforms to modernize the army, creating a new non-commissioned officer scale and improving barracks conditions. These changes also affected the military hierarchy, abolishing the Supreme Council of Military Justice, closing the General Military Academy in Zaragoza, and eliminating the ranks of captain general and lieutenant general.

On December 31, 1931, a general strike was declared, and during a demonstration in Castilblanco, protesters lynched four Civil Guards. The regiment intervened to suppress the strike from December 29 to January 6, 1932. A court-martial against the protesters responsible for the incident was held at the regiment's barracks. In the following months of 1932, the Line Infantry Regiment No. 16 remained at the Ocaña prison and had a company in Huelva. Colonel Roca was replaced by Colonel José Cantero Ortega, appointed by Decree No. 49 on March 24, 1932, a veteran of North Africa decorated for his actions.

The Line Infantry Regiment No. 16 began 1933 stationed at the Menacho barracks in Badajoz, with a detachment supporting the Ocaña prison's security. In 1934, the regiment remained in Badajoz, with personnel at the Ocaña prison, San Cristóbal Fort, and San Gabriel powder magazine. In 1935, the regiment regained its “Castilla” designation by a decree of June 25, published in the Official Gazette No. 145, restoring its traditional name and historical identity.

=== 1936 ===
In January 1936, Parliament was dissolved, and the government called elections in February, won by the Popular Front, a coalition of republican and leftist parties, after which Manuel Azaña was tasked with forming the government. Meanwhile, the Castilla No. 3, as designated by Decree No. 25 of April 23, continued its routine duties at the barracks. On May 10, Manuel Azaña was elected President of the Republic, but subsequent events altered Spain's future: the assassination of Lieutenant José Castillo of the Assault Guards on July 12, followed by the murder of José Calvo Sotelo, former Finance Minister under General Primo de Rivera, the next day. General Francisco Franco, Captain General of the Canary Islands, launched the uprising in Morocco, arriving in Tétouan by air on July 19. The rebellion was joined by regions including Galicia, Cáceres, Seville, and others, but not Madrid or Barcelona. General José Sanjurjo, the uprising's leader, died the next day when his plane crashed on takeoff from Portugal.

On July 21, two companies of the then-named Castilla No. 3, the 3rd and 4th, under Commander José Ruiz Farrona, departed for Madrid to reinforce the capital and fight in the Sierra de Guadarrama, specifically at Alto de los Leones. In early August, the rebels advanced toward Madrid, choosing Extremadura over Córdoba due to strong republican resistance there. Several battles involved the Castilla Infantry Regiment No. 3, defending the republican zone, but towns such as Almendralejo, Mérida, and Villafranca de los Barros fell to forces led by then-Lieutenant Colonel Juan Yagüe.

==== Defense and capture of Badajoz ====
As it was risky for Franco's troops to advance toward Madrid with Badajoz in their rear, where 500 Castilla No. 3 soldiers and about 3,000 armed militiamen under Colonel Ildefonso Puigdendolas were stationed, they marched toward Mérida and Badajoz under Lieutenant Colonel Yagüe. This column comprised a Legion flag, a Moroccan battalion, and engineering, medical, and supply services, totaling 4,500 men.

To capture Badajoz, the rebels positioned three artillery batteries on Cerro Gordo, a hill overlooking the city, under Captain Luis Alarcón de la Lastra. On Thursday, August 13, at 3:00 p.m., the attack was ordered. The defense, led by militiamen, focused on the Menacho barracks and the Trinidad Gate. Badajoz was isolated by rail and road, unable to receive air support, as Yagüe's planes operated from an airfield near the Portuguese city of Elvas. Yagüe aimed to encircle Badajoz, sending Commander Castejón to the Menacho barracks and Lieutenant Colonel Carlos Asensio to the Trinidad Gate. Castejón entered the barracks, defended by the Castilla No. 16, while Asensio's legionaries took the Trinidad Gate with bayonets. The battle at Puerta del Pilar was fiercer, with only the captain, a corporal, and fourteen soldiers surviving the assault, but Castejón's troops eventually entered. A brutal repression followed, with executions of all who bore arms against the rebels. The regiment's commander, Colonel José Cantero Ortega, was executed shortly after being captured. After Badajoz's capture by Franco's forces, Lieutenant Colonel Fernando Acosta Roldán reorganized the regiment under Franco's command, with Commander Eduardo Cañizares Navarro as its leader from August 19.

==== Creation and actions of the new battalions ====
- I Battalion: Formed on August 17 under Commander Fernando Ramos y Díaz de Villa, it occupied Alconchel and Villanueva del Fresno in Badajoz Province six days later. On December 15, it moved to Peñarroya-Pueblonuevo in Córdoba Province, where it ended the year.
- II Battalion: Created on August 17 under Commander José Álvarez Rodríguez, it defended Llerena against republican attacks on August 31, then occupied Alconera and Azuaga. In September, it was sent to Villagonzalo and Oliva de Mérida, ending the year between Valdetorres and Villagonzalo in Badajoz Province.
- III Battalion: Formed on September 1 under Commander Ildefonso Medina Mogollón, it remained stationed in Badajoz until December, when it was sent to Salvaleón and tasked with capturing the Monsalud ridge, achieved on December 27.
- IV Battalion: Organized on September 6 under Commander Bartolomé Guerrero, it marched to Mérida the next day, occupying Alange, Zarza de Alange, and Villagonzalo six days later. By late September, it took Guareña, all in Badajoz Province, and ended the year stationed in Mérida.
- V Battalion: Organized in early October, it moved to Campillo de la Serena and engaged the enemy near Cortijo de Tamburrero. By the end of the year, it was stationed in Santa Amalia and Oliva de Mérida.
- VI Battalion: Formed in early November, it departed on November 3 for Villafranca de los Barros, Campillo de Llerena, and Retamal de Llerena, where it ended the year.
- VII Battalion: Organized in December, it remained in Badajoz until December 23, when it was transferred to Alburquerque and San Vicente de Alcántara until the end of the year.
- VIII Battalion: Created on December 31, it remained stationed in Badajoz city.

The regiment ended the year with eight battalions, expanding to twenty in 1937.

==== 1937 ====
The republican army formed the VII Army Corps in May under Lieutenant Colonel Ruiz Farrona, based in Cabeza del Buey. The Francoist Badajoz Division became Division 21, comprising two brigades. The first, led by Lieutenant Colonel Luis Oliver, included the III, IV, V, VIII, and IX battalions of the “Castilla,” among other units. The second, under Lieutenant Colonel Alfonso Gómez Cobián, included the II, VI, IX, and X battalions of the “Castilla.” Since 1936, no significant concentrations of forces from both sides had occurred in Extremadura. The Francoist army's main goal was to encircle Mérida, where many republican troops had gathered in a “pocket,” cutting off external supplies. The operation began on July 20 and concluded on July 24 when the two Francoist brigades linked up, though they continued capturing key towns in subsequent days.

The Castilla battalions spent the rest of the year fighting across the peninsula, operating independently within various army corps and units. The most notable operation was conducted by the III Battalion under Lieutenant Colonel Álvarez Rementería in Villanueva del Duque, Córdoba, from March 16 to 19, earning the battalion the Collective Military Medal and the Individual Military Medal for its commander, Ildefonso Medina Mogollón. This decoration was awarded to the Castilla Infantry Regiment No. 16 and placed in its Banner Room.

==== 1938 ====
The I to XIV Battalions operated throughout Extremadura, in both Cáceres Province and Badajoz Province. The IX Battalion received the Collective Military Medal for actions in Villagonzalo, Guareña, Palomas, and the Cabezuela del Valle ridge, where it repelled repeated republican attacks despite being outnumbered and underequipped. On October 2, it moved to the Córdoba front, followed by the 221 Battalion, which operated in Hornachos and Azuaga, ending the year in Córdoba. The IV Workers’ Battalion operated between Llerena and Castuera. The 301 Garrison Battalion spent the year between San Vicente de Alcántara and Algeciras, as did the 302 Garrison Battalion. The 401 Public Order Battalion remained in Badajoz most of the year, moving to Talavera de la Reina by the end of the year. The 901 Garrison Battalion began in Mérida and ended in Don Benito. The 222 Garrison Battalion started in Aguilar de la Frontera, operated in the Acebuche ridge, and ended in Cabeza del Buey. In early March, the 104 Workers’ Battalion was formed, starting fortification work in Mérida, Oliva de Mérida, and Valdetorres, ending the year in Castuera. In April, the XV Battalion formed in Almendralejo, moved to the Retamal de Llerena front, and ended in Córdoba. In May, the 131 Workers’ Battalion formed in Mérida, later moving to Fuente Obejuna and Monterrubio de la Serena, continuing fortification and road repairs. In July, the 133 Workers’ Battalion formed in Los Santos de Maimona, working in Valdetorres and Santa Amalia. In August, the 112 Workers’ Battalion formed in Don Benito, remaining there for the year. On November 1, the 376 Garrison Battalion formed in Badajoz, handling supply logistics until the end of the year. In December, the 158 Workers’ Battalion formed in Montilla, Córdoba, remaining there until the end of the year.

==== 1939 ====
The Castilla Infantry Regiment No. 3, as it was then called, began 1939 with seventeen combat battalions, six workers’ battalions, four garrison battalions, and one public order battalion. As the Extremadura front reactivated with republican attacks to divert enemy forces from Catalonia, Francoist forces sent significant reinforcements, prompting a republican retreat.

Additional Castilla battalions were created. In January, the 203 Workers’ Battalion formed in Cerro Muriano, remaining in Córdoba Province until the war's end. In February, the 144 Battalion formed in Cáceres, moved through Huelva and Córdoba, and then to Jaén, where it was dissolved in July, merging into the XIV Battalion of the “Castilla.” The I Battalion began in Granada, later moving to Peñarroya, Córdoba, as did the VII Battalion. The II Battalion operated in Castuera and Campanario, later moving to Almadén, joined by the VI, VIII, XI, XII, and XIII battalions for some months. The III and IX Battalions operated in Córdoba and Jaén. The IV Battalion worked in Almería and Seville provinces. The V Battalion remained on the Madrid front, patrolling Pozuelo de Alarcón and San Lorenzo de El Escorial. The X, XIV, and XV Battalions operated in Jaén Province. The 221 and 222 Battalions fought in Peñarroya and Cabeza del Buey, with the 222 moving to Tarifa for garrison duties and dissolving in September, joining the Infantry Regiment No. 7 in Algeciras.

The 4th Workers’ Battalion remained in Castuera until July, when it moved to La Almoraima, Cádiz, where it was dissolved. The 301 Garrison Battalion was in Larache, Morocco, until its dissolution in July. The 302 Garrison Battalion, providing security on the Madrid front, was also dissolved. Similarly, the 376 Garrison, 159, 104, 131, 133, 112, and 203 Workers’, 401 Public Order, and 901 Garrison Battalions were dissolved, with their personnel discharged.

According to the July 24, 1939 Decree published in Official State Gazette No. 206, the army was reorganized on October 1, and the “Castilla” was established in Badajoz as the Castilla Infantry Regiment No. 3, under Lieutenant Colonel Bartolomé Riera Maestre, later replaced by Lieutenant Colonel Ildefonso Medina Mogollón.

== Ifni War ==
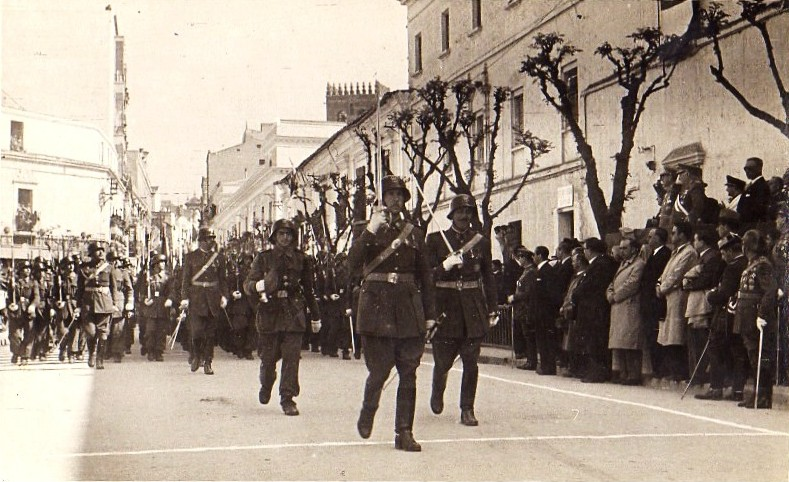
Parade of the 16th Castilla Infantry Regiment led by Commander Rovira Recio

After the postwar years, on February 22, 1957, by Ministerial Order of February 8, published in the Official Gazette No. 36, Colonel Luis Valero Coll took command of the regiment. His aide, Commander Adolfo Rovira Recio, later became the first commander of the 16th Mechanized Infantry Regiment "Castilla" with the arrival of the regiment's first tanks in Badajoz. From 1957, recruit groups marched to the plain at Cañada de Sancha Brava, about four kilometers from Badajoz, where the Sancha Brava barracks were later built, to begin their training. Command alternated between Commanders Carapeto Salgado and Rovira Recio.

From early 1957, sporadic sabotage acts occurred in Ifni, a Spanish province in southern Morocco, suggesting future escalation. On the night of November 23, 1957, insurgents infiltrated Sidi Ifni, detected by a sentinel who shouted, “Halt! Who goes there?” Receiving no response, he fired, sparking a shootout. Simultaneously, coordinated attacks targeted outposts around Sidi and began in the Spanish Sahara, further south. In response, Spain prepared several expeditionary battalions, including one from the Castilla No. 16, destined for Villa Cisneros under Commander Carapeto. On November 29, 1957, they embarked on the ship Ciudad de Oviedo, stopped in Las Palmas, and landed on the beaches of Sarga in the Río de Oro Peninsula on December 9. From the following day, the 16th Castilla Regiment began to provide its garrison services in the field.

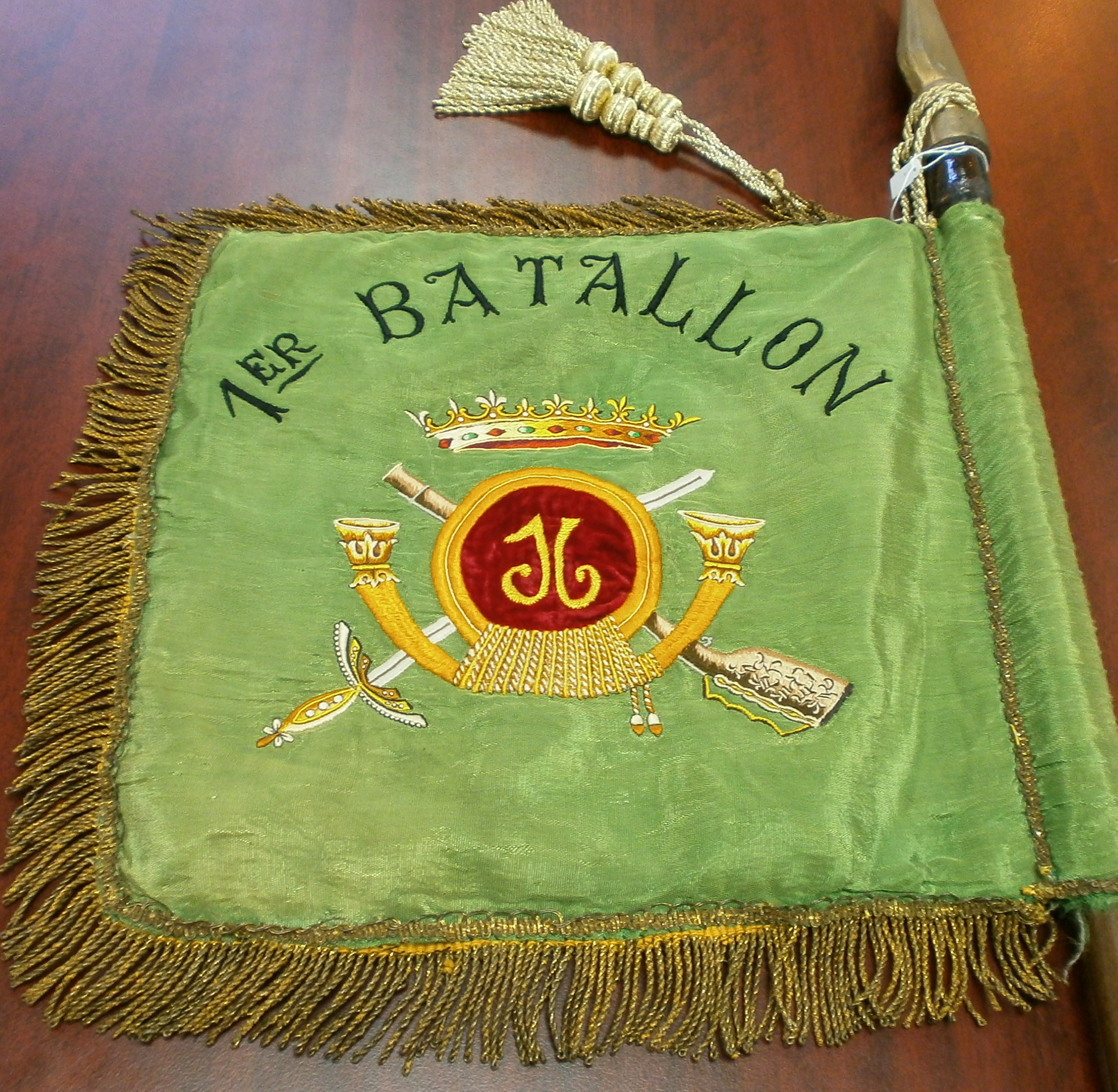
Pennant of the Castilla No. 16 expeditionary battalion in Sidi Ifni

The 16th Castilla Expeditionary Regiment not only fought against insurgent forces, but also against thirst. Their daily water ration fit in an empty can of condensed milk. Hunger was another adversary. Daily rations consisted of 60 grams of chocolate and a can of sardines. Bread arrived infested with black bugs. On Christmas Eve, the meal was beans, a hard-boiled egg, and a beer. The battalion's doctor fell ill in Las Palmas, leaving the troops without medical services, which were provided by Second Lieutenant Ángel Fernández Gaitán, a doctor. Despite these challenges, the battalion engaged in continuous combat in terrain well known to the natives and hostile to the Spanish. Their blue uniforms stood out against the desert's white sand, making them easy targets. During one of the final, fierce battles, 13,000 7.92-mm rounds and 4,000 9-mm rounds were expended. Weapons fired single shots rather than bursts.

The battalion participated in the final offensive on February 20, 1958. On June 3, it embarked on the gunboats Vasco Núñez de Balboa and Magallanes and the minesweeper Eolo, heading to Las Palmas. Five days later, they boarded the steamship Montserrat for Algeciras and traveled by rail to Badajoz. During a ceremony honoring the battalion and regiment, seventy-eight corporals and soldiers received the Cross of Military Merit, soldier Leandro Márquez Rosa was awarded the Medal for Sufferings for the Homeland, and the battalion's commanders received the Cross of Military Merit with Red Decoration. In this campaign, Sergeant Juan Serrano Leite, First Corporal Jesús González González, and soldier Fidel del Río Menayo died in combat.

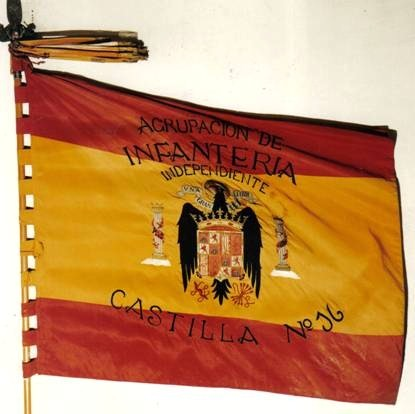
Flag of the Independent Infantry Group Castilla No. 16

== New unit designations ==
According to General Instruction No. 160-115, issued by the Army General Staff on January 15, 1960, the regiment was renamed the Independent Infantry Group Castilla No. 16 on March 1, 1960. Command passed to Colonel Justel Cadierno, followed by Colonels Alfonso Ten Turón, Enrique Gastesi Barreiro, and Enrique de Muslera Fernández. On September 21, by Circular Order of September 1, published in the Official Gazette No. 201, Lieutenant Colonel Adolfo Rovira Recio assumed the post, later becoming the first commander of the Castilla No. 16 Tank Battalion.

According to General Instruction No. 163-132, on March 31, 1963, the regiment was renamed the Independent Infantry Regiment Castilla No. 16, effective April 1, 1963. On February 17, 1966, Lieutenant Colonel Adolfo Rovira Recio was appointed commander of the tank battalion, and on September 30, when General Pedro Merry Gordon inspected the regiment, he handed command to Rovira, as the colonel position was vacant. In 1965, following an army reorganization, the regiment was redesignated as the Mechanized Infantry Regiment Castilla No. 16, in accordance with Regional Instruction No. A-58-65, and was incorporated into the Mechanized Infantry Brigade "Extremadura" XI of the Guzmán El Bueno No. 2 Mechanized Infantry Division of the Immediate Intervention Army.

On June 29, 2015, an order was issued (Order DEF/1265/2015) that established a new basic army structure centered on organic polyvalent brigades. In accordance with this order, the regiment was renamed the Castilla Armored Regiment No. 16. This change resulted in the loss of the regiment's traditional infantry status, yet it remained within the "Extremadura" XI Brigade, which, like others, became a polyvalent unit.

== New Sancha Brava barracks ==
In March 1966, the regiment's command and senior officers began moving to the new Sancha Brava barracks located on the road from Badajoz to Valverde de Leganés, about four kilometers from the capital, and on June 6, the mechanized battalion followed. On November 17, Colonel Fidel Cátedra Román took command, appointed by Circular Order of October 28, published in the Official Gazette No. 245, receiving command from Lieutenant Colonel Adolfo Rovira Recio. As M47 Patton tanks arrived, they were distributed among the battalion's companies. At this time, Lieutenant Colonel Rovira Recio relinquished command upon his promotion to colonel.

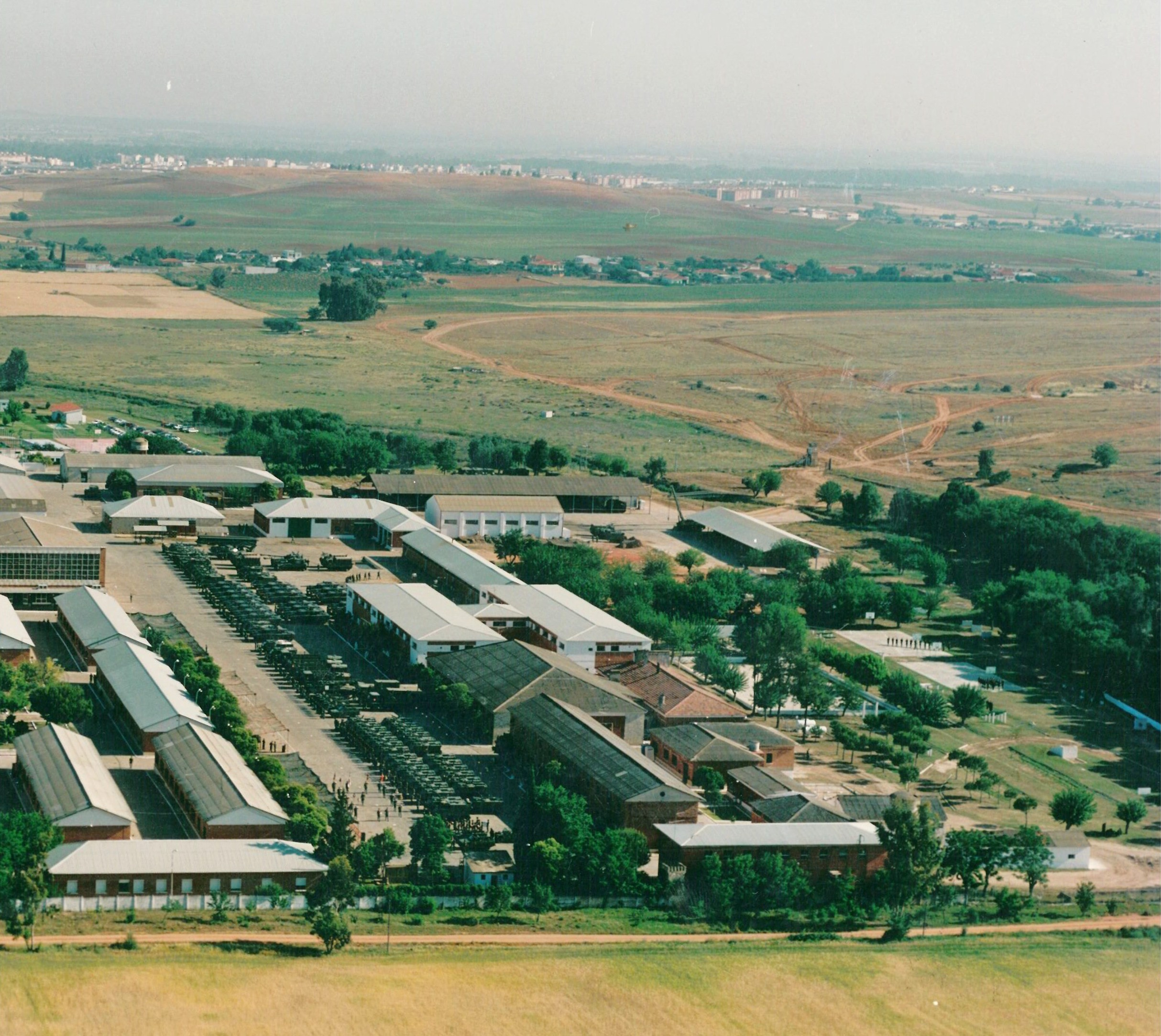
Aerial view of the Sancha Brava barracks

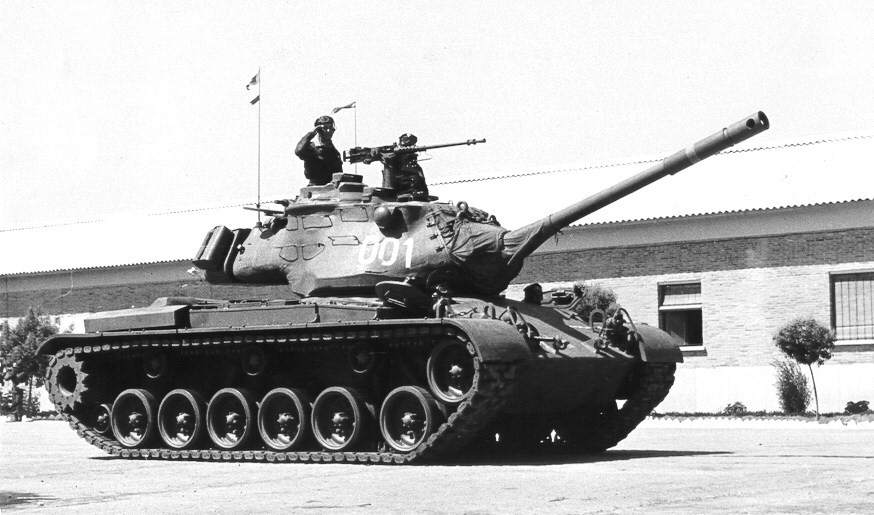
Lt. Colonel Rovira in tank 001. Parade in 1972

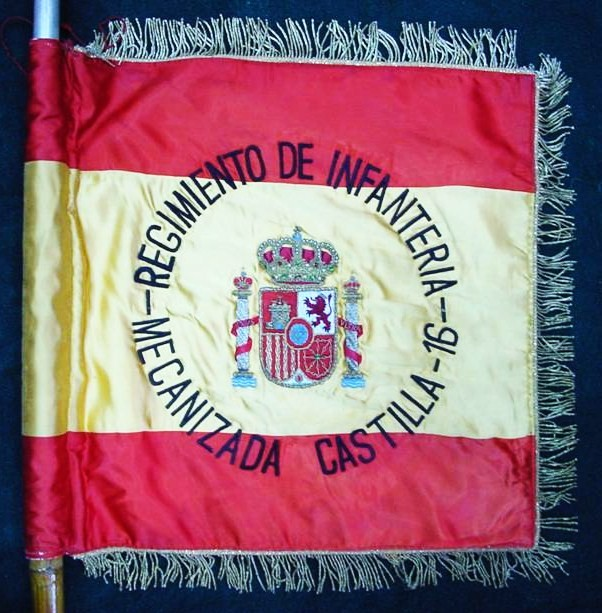
Banner of the RIMZ Castilla No. 16

On November 10, 1968, a significant event occurred: Extremadura and the Institute of Hispanic Culture paid tribute to the Spanish Army, symbolized by the 16th Mechanized Infantry Regiment "Castilla". The ceremony included the blessing and presentation of a banner donated by the Badajoz City Council. At 11:00 a.m., Captain General of the II Military Region, Manuel Chamorro Martínez, arrived. After Mass, the standard-bearers took their positions at the front of the formation. After the colonel gave his speech, the rifle company fired a salute. As the national anthem played, the flag and standards were retired to their room. Then, the forces paraded, concluding with the M47 tank battalion. Each tank in the battalion is named after an Extremaduran conquistador, earning it the title “La Hispanidad.” Representatives of the towns that donated plaques bearing the conquistadors’ names were in attendance.

== General Menacho Base ==
Fidel Cátedra Román remained in command at the beginning of 1970. He had previously been awarded the Cross of Military Merit with White Distinction. In June 1972, Army Minister Juan Castañón de Mena visited and congratulated the commanders on the thorough preparation of the inspected forces. The following years were spent conducting military exercises such as "Pegasus-98" and "Replay-94," as well as peacekeeping missions in Bosnia and Croatia. On May 29, 1999, an emotional farewell ceremony in the Plaza de Armas marked the end of the Sancha Brava barracks. On June 30 of that year, the barracks issued their final order. The 16th Mechanized Infantry Regiment of Castile, successor to the 16th Infantry Regiment of Castile, began moving to the General Menacho Base in Bótoa, about fifteen kilometers from Badajoz. It remains there today.

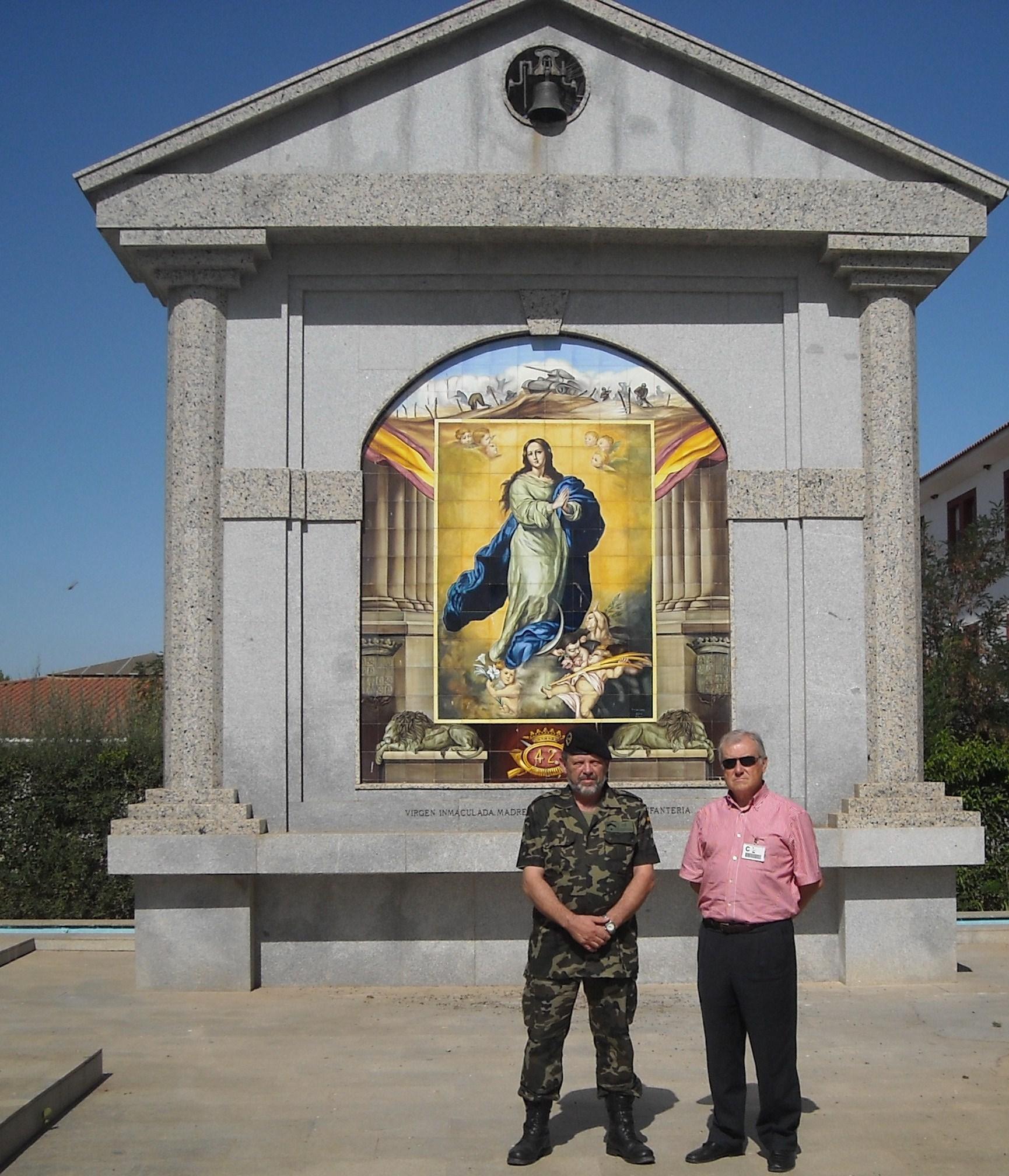
Monument to the Immaculate Conception

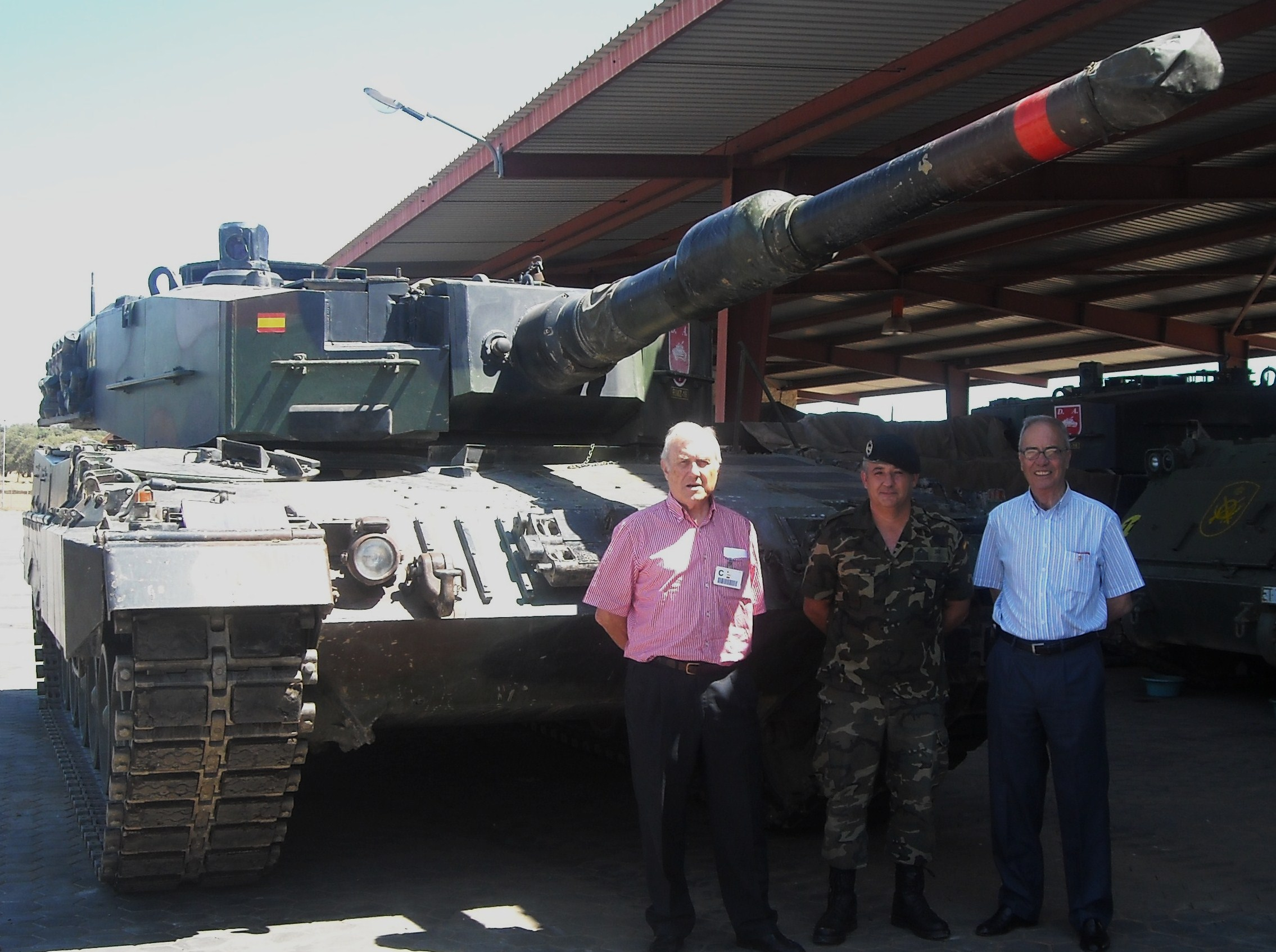
Tank at the General Menacho Base

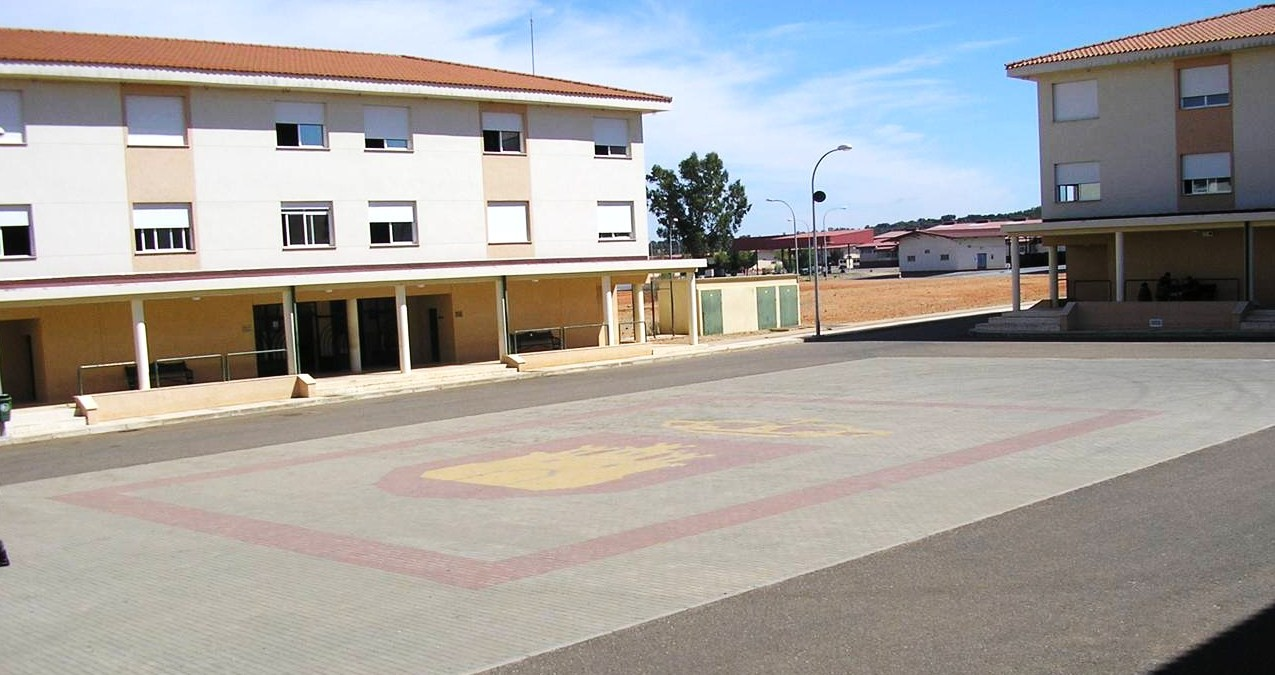
Parade ground of the General Menacho Base command area

== Commanders of the regiment since its founding ==
Chain of command of the regiment, uninterrupted since its creation by Pedro de Alcántara Álvarez de Toledo y Salm-Salm, Duke of the Infantado and first colonel of the regiment:

1793-Duke of the Infantado	1795-Antonio Senra	1796-Antonio Correa	1802-José Panés	1808-Ignacio Martínez Vallejo	1808-Gaspar Francos	1812-Francisco Hevia	1813-Francisco Bocelli
1815-Manuel Nava Campomanes	1820-José Marcos de Sáinz	1822-Pedro Antonio Barrena	1823-Narciso Pereda	1828-Francisco Sanjuanena	1835-Félix Carrera	1836-Santos San Miguel y Valledor	1837-Miguel Mir de González
1840-Miguel Mir de González	1844-Ramón Nouvilas Rafols	1849-Francisco de la Rocha y Dugi	1857-Antonio Navazo y Teresa	1859-Eduardo Aldanese Urquidi	1864-José Velarde	1865-Melitón Andrés Rodríguez	1866-José Oliva
1867-Ramón de la Torre Bordono	1868-José Cheriff y Monroy	1869-José Faura y Serra	1871-José Pierrat Iniesta	1872-Félix Aburruza Manzanares	1873-José Pierrat Iniesta	1874-Antonio Ciriza Sánchez	1876-Pascual de la Calle Iguibert
1878-Emilio Ferrer y Sarasa	1880-Leonardo Fernández Ruiz	1887-Manuel Ortega y Sánchez-Muñoz	1889-José Márquez Torres	1890-Joaquín Gutiérrez Villuendas	1893-Francisco Salinero Beliver	1894-Gabriel Gelabert Vallecilla	1896-Cándido Hernández de Velasco
1897-Domingo Recio Martínez	1907-Vicente Ambel Cárdenas	1912-José Martínez Pedréira	1914-Manuel Elías Prats	1916-Reynaldo Carrero Ventura	1918-Francisco Sosa Arbelo	1920-Luis Navarro A. de Celada	1923-Juan Urbano Palma
1925-Pedro Calderón Delgado	1926-Federico Hernández S-Caro	1931-Joaquín Guerra Zagala	1932-Adolfo Roca Lapuente	1933-José Cantero Ortega	1936-Eduardo Cañizares Navarro	1938-Luis Oliver Rubio	1939-Bartolomé Riera Ortega, Lt. Col.
1940-Bernabé Ortiz Esparraguera, Lt. Col.	1942-José Izquierdo Arroyo	1945-Ildefonso Medina Mogollón	1947-Leopoldo García Rodríguez	1952-Ildefonso Medina Mogollón	1953-Juan Gutiérrez-Maturana Matheu	1957-Luis Valero Col	1960-Cesáreo Justel Cadierno
1962-Enrique Gastesi Barreiro	1963-Enrique de Muslera González	1966-Fidel Cátedra Román	1970-Gervasio Martín Cotano	1972-Juan Camacho Collazo	1976-Leandro Blanco González	1980-José Cruz Requejo	1980-Pedro Vallespín González-Valdés
1981-Carlos Torres Espiga	1984-Hermenegildo García Briones	1985-Celestino Sanz Hurtado de Mendoza	1987-Tomás Quecedo González	1989-José Gallego del Pueyo	1991-Oliverio Celemín Peña	1993-Francisco M. García Almenta Dobón	1995-Juan José Antolín Heriz
1997-José Manuel Mollá Ayuso	1999-Alfonso Guillén Regodón	2001-Luis Martín Aragonés	2003-Alberto Asarta Cuevas	2005-Nicolás de Bari Millán Cruz	2007-Santiago Cubas Roig	2009-Jerónimo de Gregorio y Monmeneu	2011-Pedro José Cabanach Villa

Note: The last colonel of this regiment and the first colonel of the same regiment, now designated “Mechanized Infantry,” was Fidel Cátedra Román in 1966.

== Historical ensigns ==
The Army Museum's collection includes eight flags: six of them feature the national colors, while the remaining two are white.

- “Regimental Flag,” white.
- “Battalion Flag,” white.

Those with national colors are:

- Two delivered to the regiment on July 16, 1845, in Pamplona.
- Two replacing the above, delivered on July 16, 1876, in Vitoria-Gasteiz.
- Two replacing the previous, delivered on May 7, 1902, in Badajoz.
- One of the above was replaced in 1941, with the old one deposited in the Army Museum.
- In 1968, the other was replaced by a standard when the regiment became a “mechanized unit.”
- Due to changes in the National Coat of Arms, this standard was replaced on December 18, 1983, and entrusted to the Badajoz City Council for safekeeping.

== Patron saints ==
Throughout its history, the regiment has had several patron saints. From its establishment until September 1829, the patron was Saint Peter of Alcántara. From that date onward, the Virgin of Carmel was designated as the regiment's patroness, as her feast day on July 16 coincided with the Battle of Navas de Tolosa in 1212, fought near the town of Santa Elena in the Jaén province. In this battle, King Alfonso VIII, alongside the Navarrese troops led by Sancho VII of Navarre and the Aragonese forces under Peter II of Aragon, confronted the numerically superior army of the Almohad caliph Muhammad al-Nasir. The battle was the culmination of a crusade initiated by King Alfonso VIII, the Archbishop of Toledo, Rodrigo Jiménez de Rada, and Pope Innocent III against the Almohads who dominated Al-Andalus. The engagement resulted in a significant victory for the Christian forces and marked a high point of the Reconquista, as it signaled the beginning of the end of Muslim presence in the Iberian Peninsula.

Later, in 1892, the Immaculate Conception was declared the "sole patroness of the Infantry Branch" through a Royal Order dated November 12, under Official Decree 248 (D.O. 248), and she remains the sole patroness to this day.

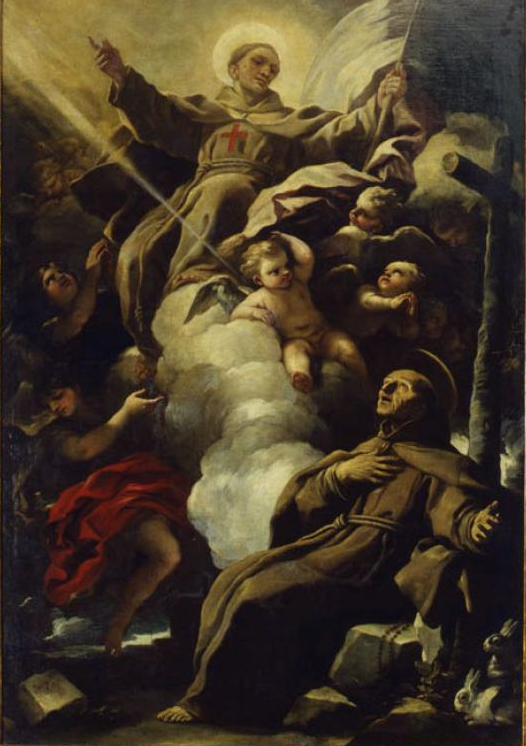
The Apparition of Saint John of Capistrano to Saint Peter of Alcántara, by Luca Giordano

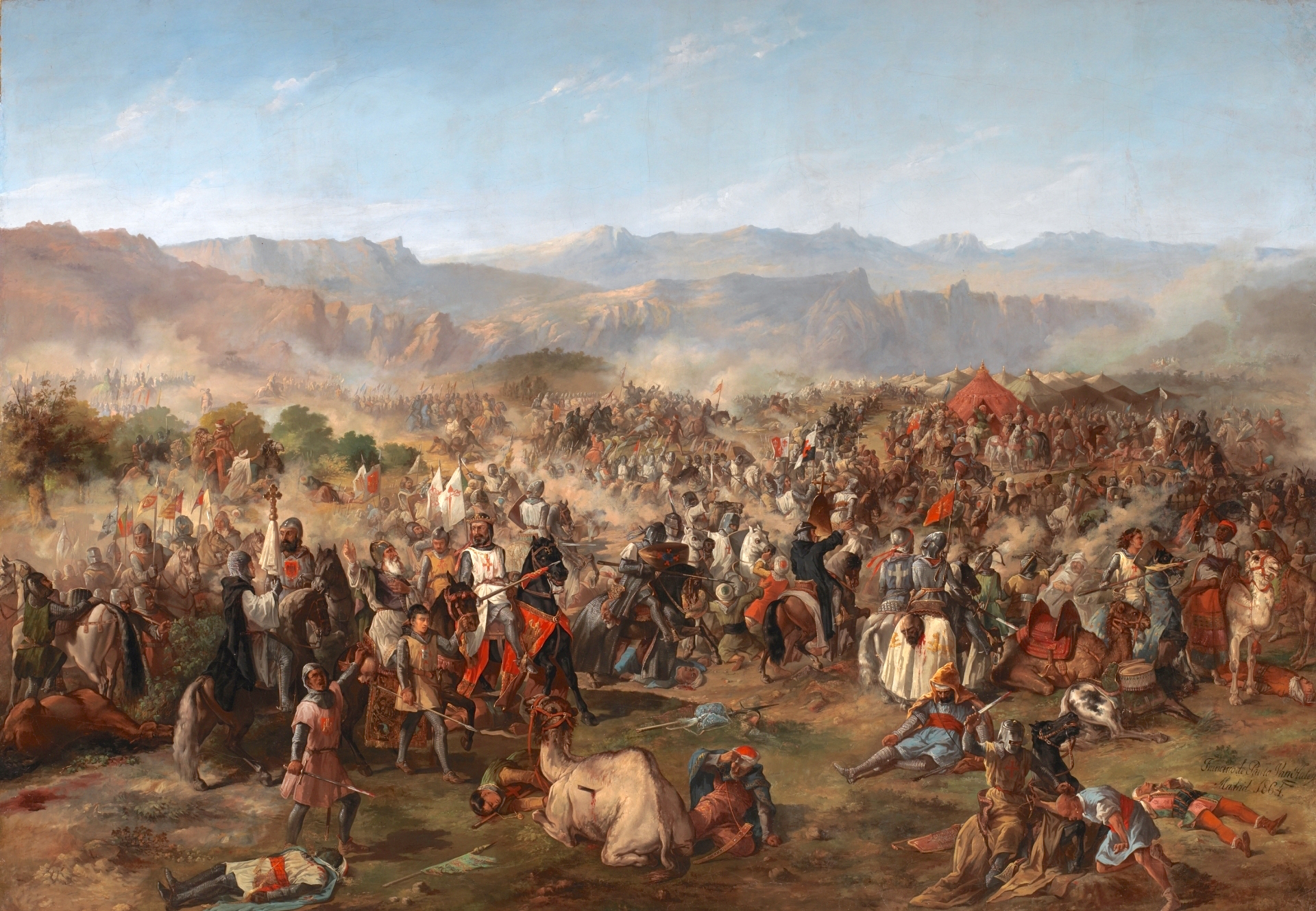
Battle of Las Navas de Tolosa, by Van Halen, displayed in the Senate Palace (Madrid)

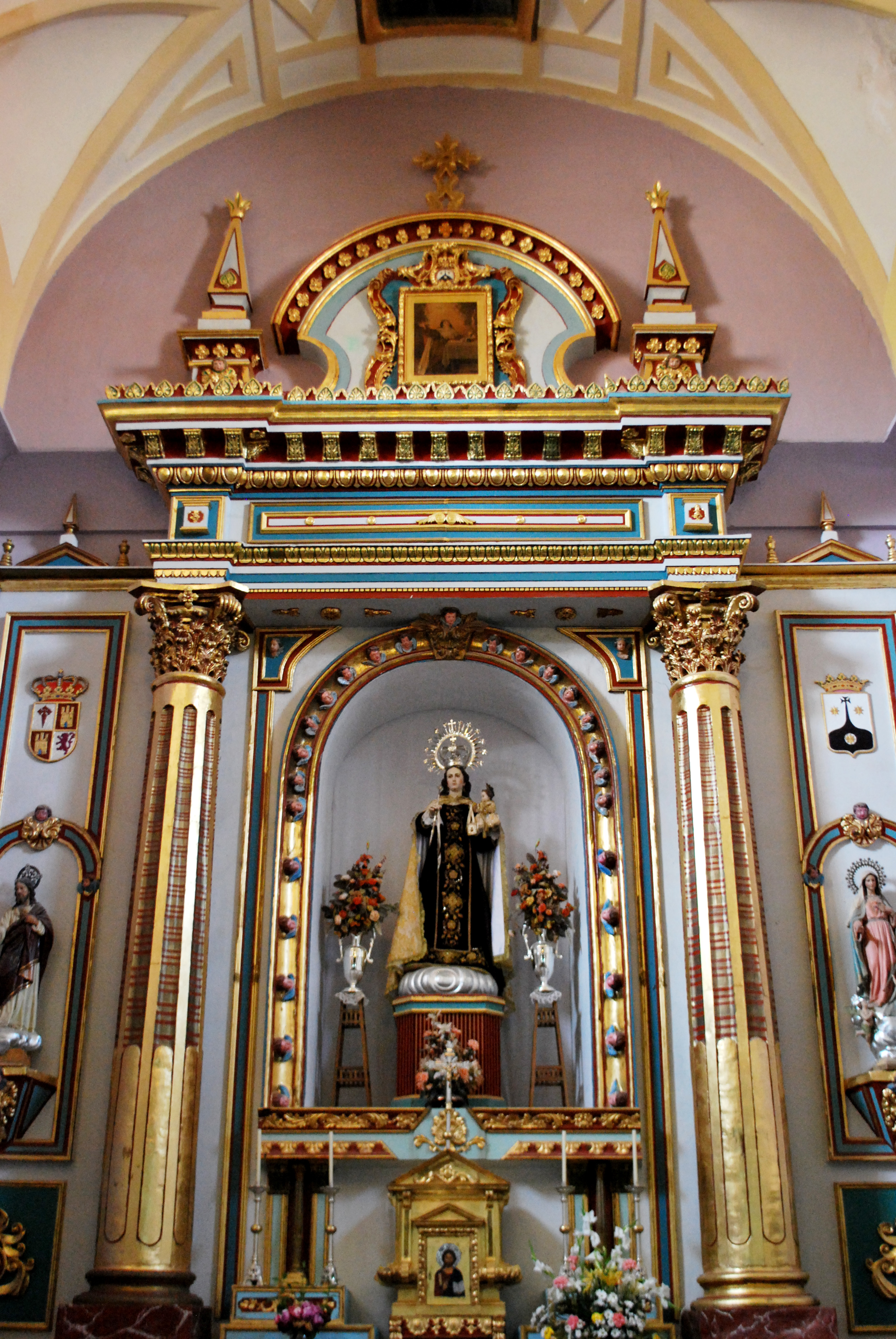
Virgin of Carmel in Liétor (Albacete)

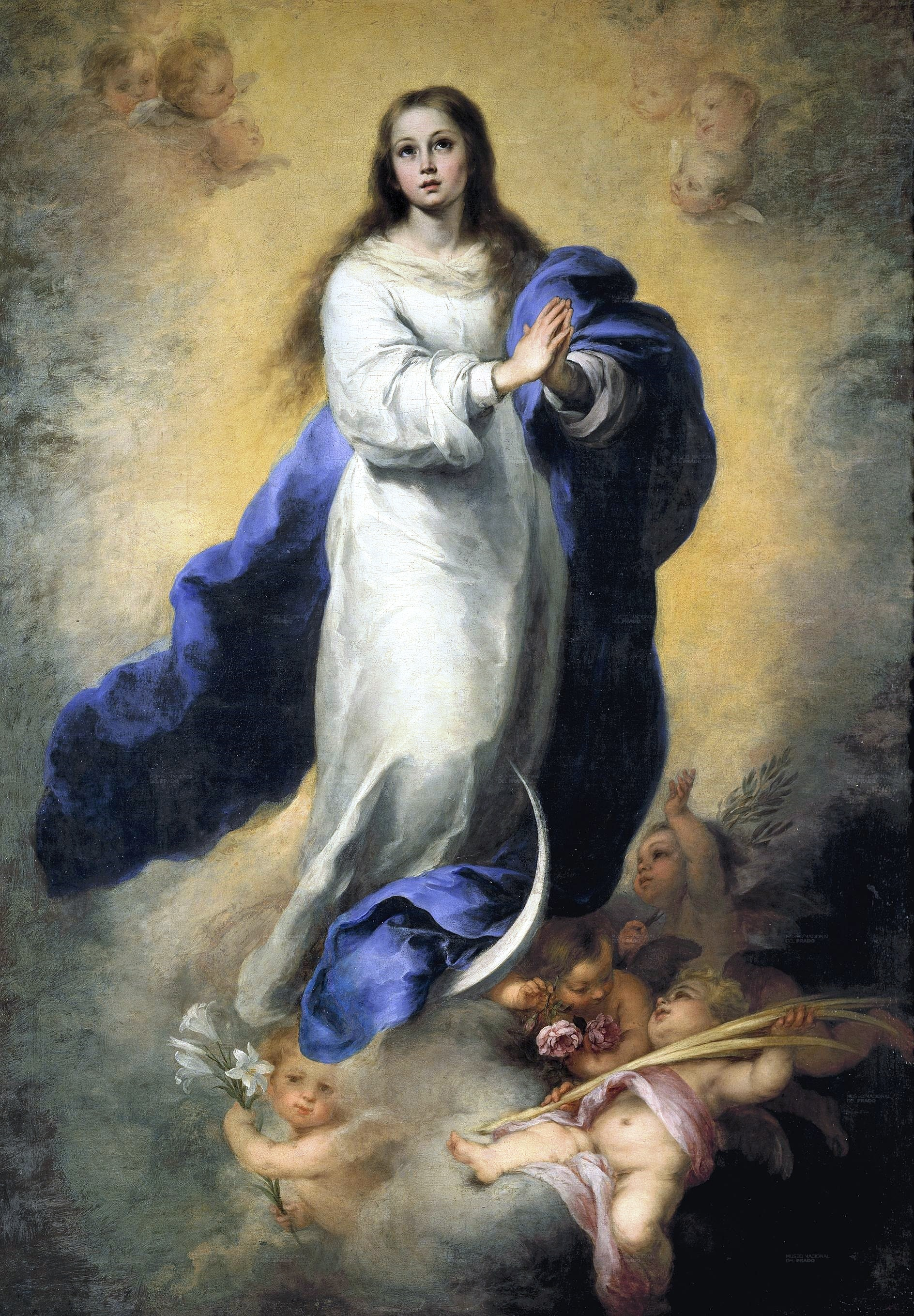
The Immaculate Conception of El Escorial, by Murillo

== Anthem of the regiment ==
The regiment's anthem was composed by Bonifacio Gil in 1924. The original score is preserved in the museum of the RIMZ Castilla No. 16 in Bótoa (Badajoz). Bonifacio Gil began his military career as a drummer in the "La Lealtad" regiment in Burgos, later served as a first-class musician in the "Zamora Regiment" in Ferrol, and successfully passed the competitive examination to become a director of military bands, achieving the top rank. He eventually attained the rank of commander and director of music. He was assigned to the regiment from 1924 to 1947. During this period, he devoted himself to compiling Extremaduran folklore, and the Badajoz Provincial Council published his work titled Cancionero popular de Extremadura in two volumes. He also served as the director of the Badajoz Music Conservatory. The lyrics were written by Captain José Castillo:

I am a soldier of the 16th Castilla Regiment; I must appear content and joyful	Happy to be a soldier in a homeland of freedoms freedoms won with blood shed to the cry of "Long live Spain!"	Attack, attack attack with valor know how to win or die
For honor and manliness the Spanish soldier must preserve his history more than his life or glory	Our motto is to always be faithful. I promise to shout with energy, knowing how to win or die. CASTILLA was always like that.	Lyrics by Captain José Castillo; Music by Bonifacio Gil

== See also ==
- Spanish Army

== Bibliography ==
- Alfaro Pereira, Manuel (1960). Diputación Provincial (ed.). Más estampas de Badajoz [More Prints of Badajoz] (in Spanish). Badajoz: Ayuntamiento. p. 248. OCLC 431956486.
- Barado y Font, Francisco (1883–1886). "Volume No. 3 (17th–20th centuries)". Museo militar; historia, indumentaria, armas sistemas de combate, instituciones, organización del ejército español [Military Museum; History, Uniforms, Weapons, Combat Systems, Institutions, Organization of the Spanish Army] (in Spanish). Barcelona: Evaristo Ullastres. OCLC 816982093.
- Busquets, Julio (1982). Pronunciamientos y Golpes de Estado en España [Pronouncements and Coups d'État in Spain] (in Spanish). Collection Textos, 68. Planeta. p. 217. ISBN 8432006386. OCLC 8689097.
- Carroza Luengo, Miguel (2011). "Volume No. 4". Diarios y archivos [Diaries and Archives].
- Casas de la Vega, Rafael (1985). La última guerra de África: campaña de Ifni-Sáhara [The Last War in Africa: Ifni-Sahara Campaign] (in Spanish). Collection ADALID, 14. Servicio de Publicaciones del EME. p. 568. ISBN 8450522676. OCLC 16982528.
- Clemente, José Carlos (1985). Bases documentales del Carlismo y de las guerras civiles de los siglos XIX y XX [Documentary Bases of Carlism and the Civil Wars of the 19th and 20th Centuries]. Volume I: From the Origins to Carlos V - Volume II: From Carlos VI to Carlos VII. Madrid: Servicio Histórico Militar. ISBN 8450521742. OCLC 15017074.
- García Ramos, Antonio (2001). Memoria de una epopeya [Memory of an Epic]. History (1st ed.). Badajoz: RIMZ Castilla No. 16. p. 630. OCLC 433018623.
- García Ramos, Antonio (1987). Regimiento de Infantería Mecanizada Castilla núm. 16 [Castilla Mechanized Infantry Regiment No. 16] (in Spanish). History. Badajoz: RIMZ Castilla No. 16. p. 214. OCLC 434907804.
- Gil Álvaro, Antonio (1893). Glosas de la Infantería Española [Commentaries on the Spanish Infantry]. Madrid.
- Gómez de Arteche, José (1868–1903). "Volume No. 2". La Guerra de la Independencia: historia militar de España de 1808-1814 [The War of Independence: Military History of Spain from 1808–1814] (in Spanish). Madrid: Carlos Bailly-Bailliere. OCLC 803089825.
- Lafuente, Modesto. "Volume No. 9". Historia General de España [General History of Spain] (1850 ed.). Madrid: Establecimiento Tipográfico de Mellado. OCLC 611596.
- Marcillac de, Louis (1815). Historia de la guerra entre la España y la Francia: durante la revolución francesa [History of the War Between Spain and France: During the French Revolution]. ILM, 2820. Madrid: Repullés. p. 284. OCLC 24956230.
- Más Chao, Andrés (1989). Evolución de la Infantería en el Reinado de Alfonso XII [Evolution of the Infantry During the Reign of Alfonso XII] (in Spanish). Collection Adalid, 22. Madrid: Servicio de Publicaciones del EME. p. 285. OCLC 30488706.
- Pilo Ortiz, Francisco (2001). Ellos lo vivieron: sucesos en Badajoz durante los meses de julio y agosto de 1936, narrados por personas que los presenciaron [They Lived It: Events in Badajoz During July and August 1936, Narrated by Those Who Witnessed Them] (in Spanish). Badajoz: Pilo Ortiz. pp. 159 (29, 30, 93). ISBN 8460718980. OCLC 807930070.
- Santamaría, Ramiro (1984). Ifni-Sáhara. La guerra ignorada [Ifni-Sahara: The Ignored War] (in Spanish). Collection Ensayo, 2 (3rd ed.). Madrid: DYRSA. p. 371. ISBN 8486169089. OCLC 434022584.
- Tuñón de Lara, Manuel (1980). "Volumes No. 7, 8, 9, and 10". Historia de España [History of Spain] (in Spanish). Barcelona: Labor. OCLC 489566292.
- VV. AA. (1881). "Volume No. 4". In Espasa Calpe (ed.). Historia General de España [General History of Spain]. Barcelona: Montaner y Simón Editores. OCLC 434225692.
- VV., AA. (1947–1981). Servicio Geográfico del Ejército (ed.). Historia de las Campaña de Marruecos [History of the Moroccan Campaigns]. Madrid: Servicio Histórico Militar. OCLC 1223320.
- Weyler y Nicolau, Valeriano (1911). "Volumes I, II, III, and IV". Mi mando en Cuba: 10 de febrero de 1896 a 31 de octubre de 1897; historia militar y política de la última guerra separatista durante dicho mando [My Command in Cuba: February 10, 1896 to October 31, 1897; Military and Political History of the Last Separatist War During Said Command]. Madrid: Felipe González Rojas. OCLC 698601656.
