= Order of Cisneros =

Title of honor of Spain established under Francisco Franco

Awarded by the (Spain) Spanish State
- Type: State order
- Established: 8 March 1944
- Status: Dormant
- Founder: Francisco Franco
- Grand Master: King Felipe VI
- Chancellor: Félix Bolaños
- Classes: 8

Statistics
- First induction: 1944
- Last induction: September 1977

Precedence
- Next (higher): Order of Merit of the National Plan Against Drugs
- Next (lower): Royal Order of Civil Recognition to the Victims of Terrorism
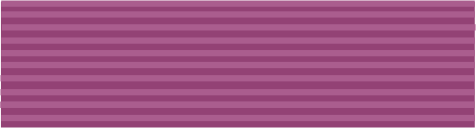
- Ribbon of the order

The Order of Cisneros (Spanish: Orden de Cisneros) is a state order of Spain created in 1944. It is named after Cardinal Francisco Jiménez de Cisneros. Primarily bestowed during the Francoist dictatorship and currently dormant, it rewarded political merit.

== History ==
The Order of Cisneros was established by Francisco Franco on 8 March 1944. The order was modified in 1976 to only reward politicians for merit, and was later modified again on 15 April 1977. Although the order has not been awarded since September 1977, it has not been formally abolished by the Spanish government.

== Design ==
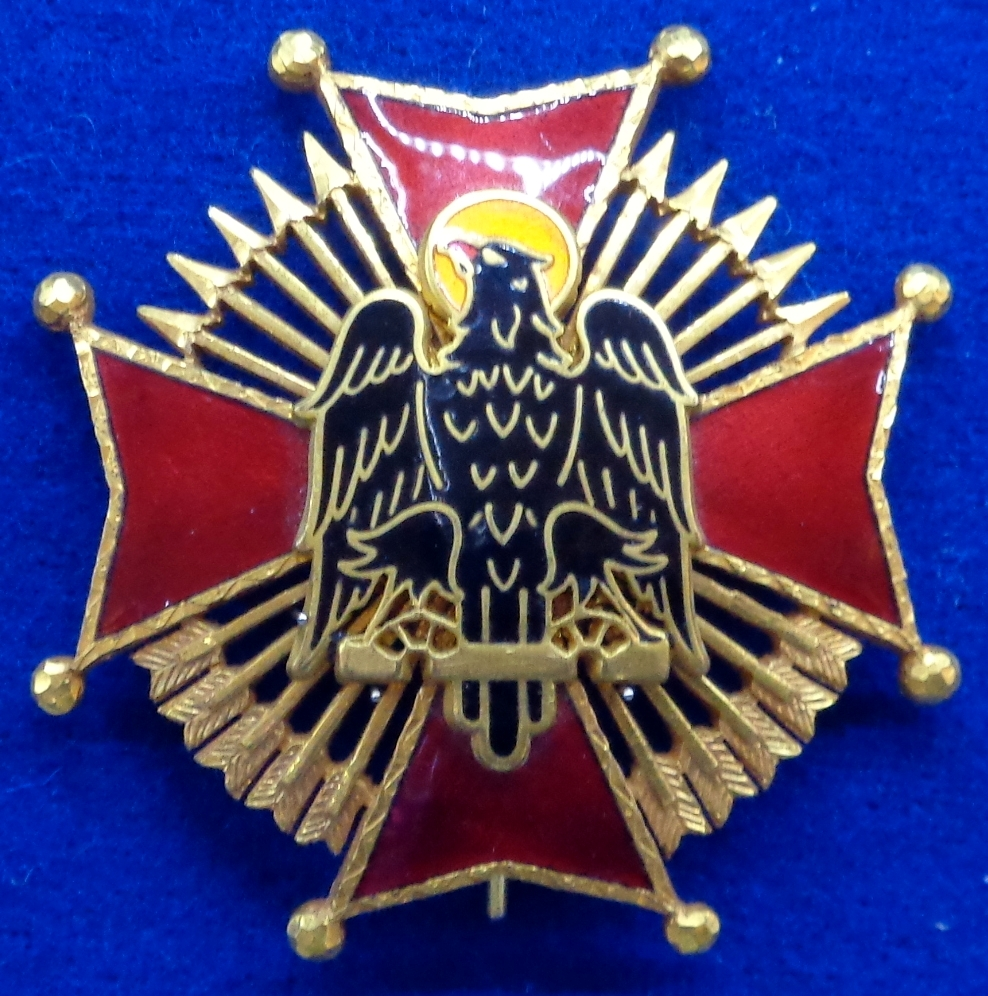
The Order of Cisneros in the Tallinn Museum of Orders of Knighthood.

The order is composed of the Eagle of Saint John atop a red Maltese cross. Adorning the cross are two sets of five arrows and a yoke is present at the tail of the eagle, in reference to the yoke and arrows, the symbol of the Catholic Monarchs of Spain which was repurposed by the Falangist movement.

== Classes ==
The order is composed of eight classes:

- Grand Collar
- Grand Cross
- Band
- Commendation with Plaque
- Commendation
- Ribbon
- Cross
- Gold Medal

Classes
Grand Collar	Grand Cross	Commander with Star	Commander	Bow (for Ladies)	Cross	Gold Medal
	(Sash and Pendant)	(Star)				

== Notable recipients ==
- (Spain) Emiliano José Alfaro Arregui (1977)
- (Spain) Carlos Asensio Cabanillas (1956)
- (Spain) José Luis de Azcárraga Bustamante
- (Spain) Antonio Barroso y Sánchez Guerra (1953)
- (Spain) Manuel Baturone Colombo
- (Spain) Luis Carrero Blanco (1970)
- (Spain) Andrés Casinello
- (Spain) Antonio Castejón Espinosa
- (Spain) Víctor Castro (1976)
- (Spain) José Cuesta Monereo
- (Spain) Sancho Dávila y Fernández de Celis (Commendation with Plaque, 1944)
- (Spain) Luis Díez-Alegría (18 July 1967)
- (Spain) Francisco Franco y Salgado Araújo
- (Spain) Alfredo Galera (1956)
- (Spain) Rafael García Valiño
- (Spain) Carlos Iniesta Cano (18 July 1969)
- (Spain) José Lacalle (1956)
- (Spain) Tomás de Liniers y Pidal (1974)
- (Spain) José López Ortiz
- (Spain) Francisco López Sanz(1960)
- (Spain) Pablo Martín Alonso (1956)
- (Spain) Pedro Pimentel Zayas
- (Spain) Miguel Rodrigo Martínez
- (Spain) Camilo Menéndez Tolosa (1945)
- (Spain) Mohamed Meziane
- (Spain) Agustín Muñoz Grandes (1956, 1970)
- (Spain) Pedro Nieto (1954)
- (Spain) Pilar Primo de Rivera
- (Spain) Joaquín Ríos Capapé
- (Spain) Eduardo Sáenz de Buruaga
- (Spain) Apolinar Sáenz de Buruaga y Polanco (1956)
- (Spain) Juan Bautista Sánchez de Bilbao (1956)
- (Spain) Ángel Salas Larrazábal
- (Spain) Gustavo Urrutia González

Grand Masters

- (Spain) Francisco Franco
- (Spain) Juan Carlos I
- (Spain) Felipe VI

=== Coats of arms of recipients ===
Luis Carrero Blanco

Pilar Primo de Rivera

== See also ==
- Imperial Order of the Yoke and Arrows
