= Mechanized Infantry Regiment "Castilla" No. 16 =

Spanish military unit

Mechanized Infantry Regiment «Castilla» No. 16
- Coat of arms of the regiment as an armored unit (since 2015)
- Active: Since April 1793; Since 2015 in its current configuration
- Country: Spain
- Allegiance: Spain
- Branch: Spanish Army
- Type: Multi-role
- Role: Mechanized
- Garrison/HQ: Sancha Brava Barracks on the outskirts of Badajoz and later at General Menacho Base in Bótoa, approximately 20 km from Badajoz
- Nickname: "The Hero"
- Patron: Immaculate Conception
- Decorations: Laureate Cross of Saint Ferdinand

Insignia
- Identification symbol

The Mechanized Infantry Regiment "Castilla" No. 16 is currently a versatile unit of the Spanish Army, traditionally integrated into the infantry. Since 2015, with the introduction of multi-role organic brigades, it was designated as the Armored Regiment "Castilla" No. 16. It has been known as "Mechanized Infantry" since 1966, when the first tanks arrived at its Sancha Brava barracks. Until that time, the unit was designated as the 16th Infantry Regiment "Castilla". Years later, in 1975, the limitations of the barracks and, in particular, the training and firing range became evident, necessitating restrictions on the direction and range of projectiles. This led to considerations for relocating the unit to a larger facility that could also accommodate other units, transforming it into a base housing multiple regiments and logistical and support units. This plan was realized with the construction of the General Menacho Base near the village of Bótoa, approximately 20 km from Badajoz, where the regiment has been stationed since 1999.

During its time at the Sancha Brava Barracks, the regiment experienced significant historical moments, some challenging and others rewarding. Among the challenges was the difficult situation surrounding the coup attempt on February 23, 1981. Days earlier, most of the regiment's tanks were on maneuvers in Cerro Muriano, Córdoba, and were ordered to return to their Badajoz barracks before the maneuvers concluded. Upon arrival at Sancha Brava, all personnel were placed on alert, and tanks and other vehicles were refueled and armed. The regiment remained loyal to the Constitution and continued its operations with complete normalcy.

The first tanks assigned to the regiment were the American M47 Patton, M41 Walker Bulldog, and APCs (armoured personnel carriers) in their M577 command variants and M113 for troop transport and other functions. In 1983, the AMX-30E (the Spanish version of the French AMX-30) arrived, followed by the M60 Patton, the German Leopard 2A4 in the mid-1990s, and finally the Spanish Leopard 2E. Regarding its activities, the regiment has participated in various humanitarian and peacekeeping missions in El Salvador, six deployments in Bosnia-Herzegovina, one in Yugoslavia, two in Kosovo, one in Iraq, one in Indonesia, and three in Lebanon.

== Coat of arms and decorations ==
The coat of arms of the Armored Regiment "Castilla" No. 16 features a gold castle, embattled, with three towers and adorned with sable on a gules field, with the Laureate Cross of Saint Ferdinand hanging from the lower point, accompanied by armorial pieces; the castle symbolizes the region of its namesake. The regiment bears the nickname "The Hero", earned for its heroism against the French during the second siege of Zaragoza, particularly in the bayonet assault at Torrero hill and the defense of the Convent of Jesus on December 21, 1808. According to Infantry Captain Antonio Gil Álvaro in 1893, "this nickname is due to the regiment's actions during the second siege of Zaragoza." The Supreme Junta, then based in Cádiz, decreed that these forces be called "Meritorious of the Homeland" for their "heroic and eminent service."

Seven decorations for distinguished heroic actions hang from the lower part of the coat of arms. From left to right, they are as follows:

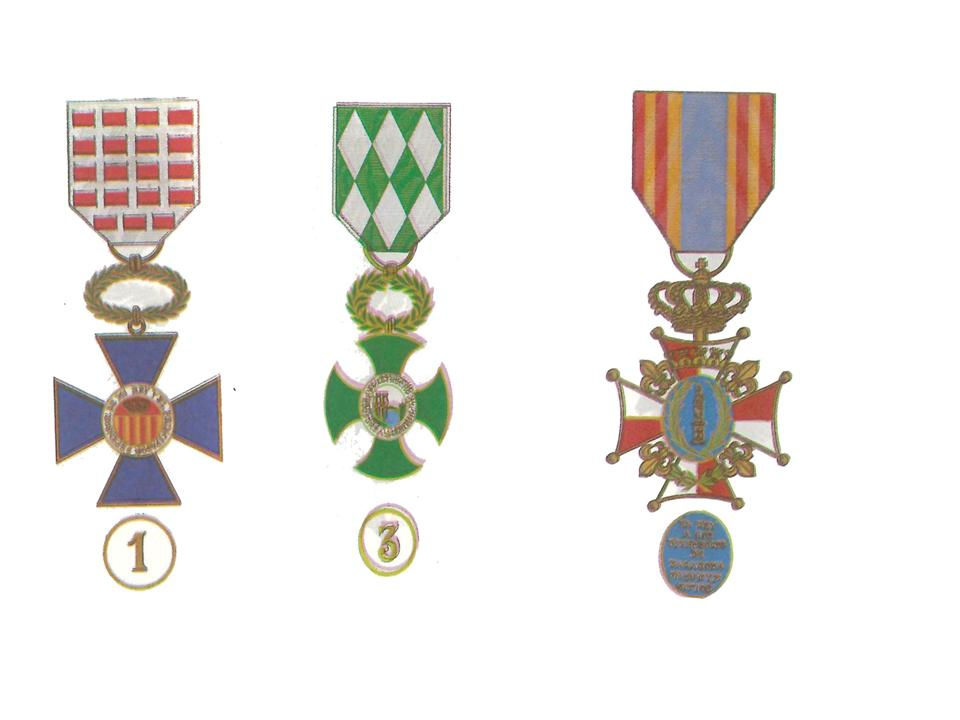
Cross of the First Army or of Catalonia, Cross of the Third Army, Cross of Zaragoza in its first and second sieges.

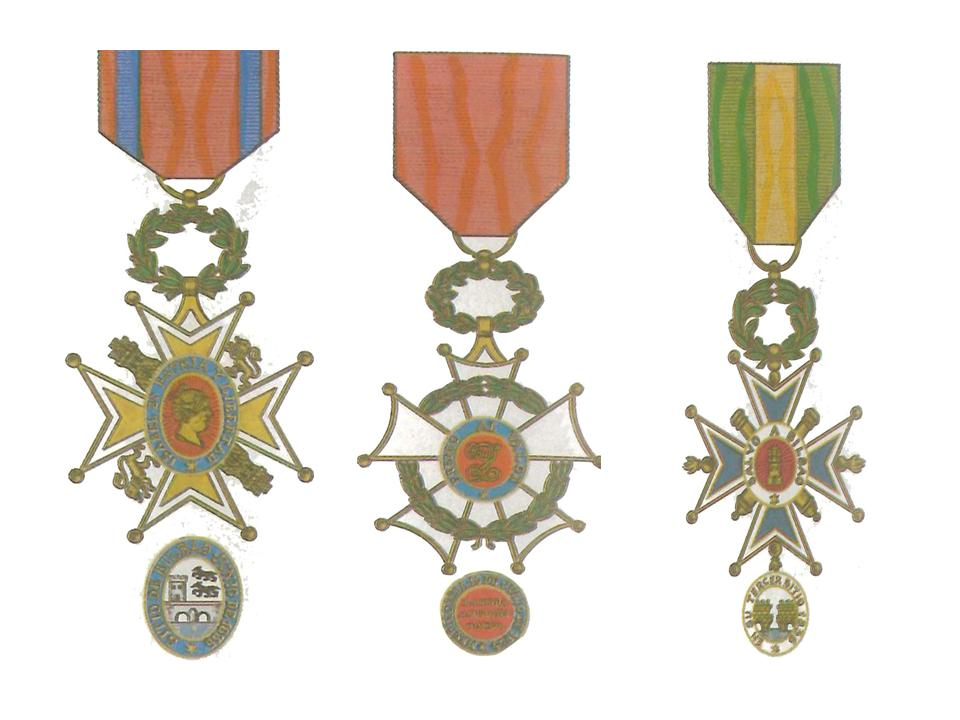
Cross of the First Siege of Bilbao, Cross of Mendigorría, Cross of the Third Siege of Bilbao (Saviors).

- Cross of the First Army or of Catalonia. It consists of four triangular arms enameled in turquoise blue. In the center is a circular shield with a royal crown on a red field, and below, the stripes of Catalonia on gold. The inscription reads "Defender of my King and the Principality." On the reverse, the number "1" appears. The ribbon is white with red edges. This is in accordance with the Royal Order of March 31, 1815.
- Cross of the Third Army. It features a mountain with an inscription around it that reads "Victor from the Strait to the Pyrenees." On the reverse, the number "3" refers to the ordinal number of the army, on a green field. It has a crimson crown linking it to a ribbon of white and green diamonds. The Royal Order of concession is, like the previous one, dated March 31, 1815.
- Cross of Zaragoza in its First and Second Sieges. Created on the same date as the previous ones for the troops that endured both sieges, with the intent that they wear only one distinction cross. It is similar to the other two but with notable differences resulting from combining them into a single piece. The arms are red and white by halves; the central oval, featuring the Virgin of the Pillar, is blue with lilies between the arms, a mural crown on the upper arm, and a laurel crown on the lower one. It bears a royal crown and hangs from a ribbon with a central blue stripe and two yellow and two red fillets on each side. On the reverse, over blue, it reads: "The King to the defenders of Zaragoza in its 1st and 2nd Sieges." The Royal Order granting it has different dates according to specialized authors: March 25, 1817, according to Calvó Pascual, and May 13, 1817, according to Gravalos-Calvo Pérez.
- Cross of the First Siege of Bilbao. This decoration was awarded to the regiment by Queen Regent Isabella II on July 6, 1835, to honor the defenders of the city during its "first siege." The officers' decoration is gold, while the troops' is silver. It consists of four equal arms enameled in white, with a gold center and ends finished in gold globes. In the center, an oval shape displays the bust of Queen Isabella II on a red background, with the inscription on a blue enamel circle: "Isabella II, Homeland and Liberty." Between the arms are two lions and two gold castles, and above the upper vertical arm is a laurel crown linked to a red ribbon with two blue stripes. On the reverse are the arms of Bilbao and, around it, on blue, the inscription: "Siege of Bilbao, June 1835."
- Cross of Mendigorría. This cross was awarded to the regiment by Royal Order of September 23, 1835, issued by Queen Regent Isabella II of Spain. It consists of five white enameled blades linked by a laurel border. Over this is another laurel crown linked to a red ribbon. In the center, the inscription "Y2" appears on red, and around it, on blue, the motto "Reward for Valor." On the reverse, in another circle, the inscription reads: "The Queen to her defenders" in horizontal lines, and on a blue crown surrounding it: "Mendigorría July 16, 1835."
- Cross of the Third Siege of Bilbao. Similar to the previous one, but the colors of the arms and the ribbon are alternated, and the shape of the arms is slightly different. Between the arms are two cannons, while three bombs cross the interstices. In the center, "Saved Bilbao" and a gold castle on a red background. On the reverse, the inscription reads: "In its Third Siege," and in the center, a broken bridge over the river. The laurel crown linking it to the ribbon contains no pieces inside. The decree granting this decoration is the same as the previous one.
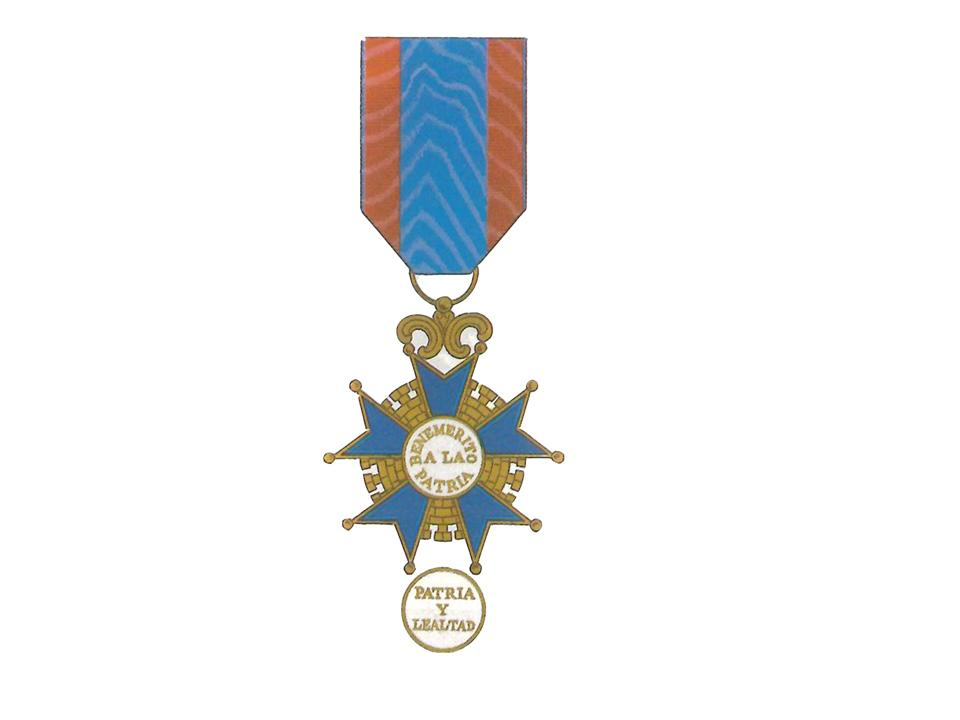
  Cross of Merit for the Homeland
- Cross of Merit for the Homeland. This decoration never received official recognition. However, it is included due to the numerous examples found in museums and private collections and the mystery surrounding it. The brief history of this questionable decoration is as follows: In 1809, the Cádiz Cortes declared some regiments, including the "Bourbon Infantry Regiment," as "Meritorious of the Homeland." This honor continued during the reigns of Ferdinand VII, Isabella II, the Provisional Government of 1868–1871, Amadeo I, the First Spanish Republic, and Alfonso XII, before falling into disuse, possibly due to overuse. The decoration resembles the previous two: five blue enameled arms over a circle resembling a wall, with a smaller central circle bearing an inscription. The ribbon is blue with two red stripes. Typically, it reads "Meritorious to the Homeland" or "… of the Homeland" on the obverse and reverse, though some examples feature the effigy of Isabella II or have a ribbon reading "Homeland and Loyalty," while others lack enamel and are stamped in poor-quality metal. Evidence that this decoration was merely a fantasy of those who used it is found in the Official Bulletin of the Captaincy General of Cuba, year IX, number 51, which publishes a resolution dated September 13, 1870, stating: "Manuel González González, a volunteer from the Havana Battalion, requested authorization to use the Cross of Merit for the Homeland, claiming that in that city, Army Chiefs and Officers use it. The Captain General has resolved to dismiss this request, as such a Cross does not officially exist, and its use is prohibited by various royal provisions, the most recent being August 26, 1867, so Your Excellency will ensure that such abuse ceases immediately…". The origin of its use is unknown, but due to its similarity to the previous models, it is placed here.

== History ==
=== Background ===
The unit's origins date back to 1793, when the XIII Duke of the Infantado, Pedro de Alcántara Álvarez de Toledo y Salm-Salm, who would become its first colonel, submitted a request to create the regiment to King Charles IV on April 3, 1793. The king approved the request on April 15 of the same year. Its initial designation was the "Castilla Volunteers Regiment," as notified by the Minister of War on April 25, 1793, expressing the king's wish for this name. At its founding, the regiment consisted of three battalions, each with four fusilier companies. Years later, in 1883, while the Castilla No. 16 was stationed in Leganés, a Royal Order of December 10, 1883, assigned the regiment to Badajoz. The Castilla No. 16 departed on December 16 and took six days to organize the transfer by railway. Upon arriving in Badajoz, it occupied the San Francisco el Grande Barracks, which was vacant after the dissolution of the Covadonga Regiment No. 41, which had previously occupied it.

From December 17, 1883, the Castilla Infantry Regiment No. 16 became tied to the city of Badajoz for over a century, during which many generations of Extremadurans, particularly from Badajoz, were trained in its ranks (at that time, recruits were assigned to the nearest regiments). This marked the origin of the 16th Infantry Regiment "Castilla", which, in 1966, with the arrival of tanks, was renamed the "Mechanized Infantry Regiment Castilla No. 16" and had as its first commander, from February 17, 1966, Lieutenant Colonel Rovira Recio.

=== Sancha Brava Barracks ===
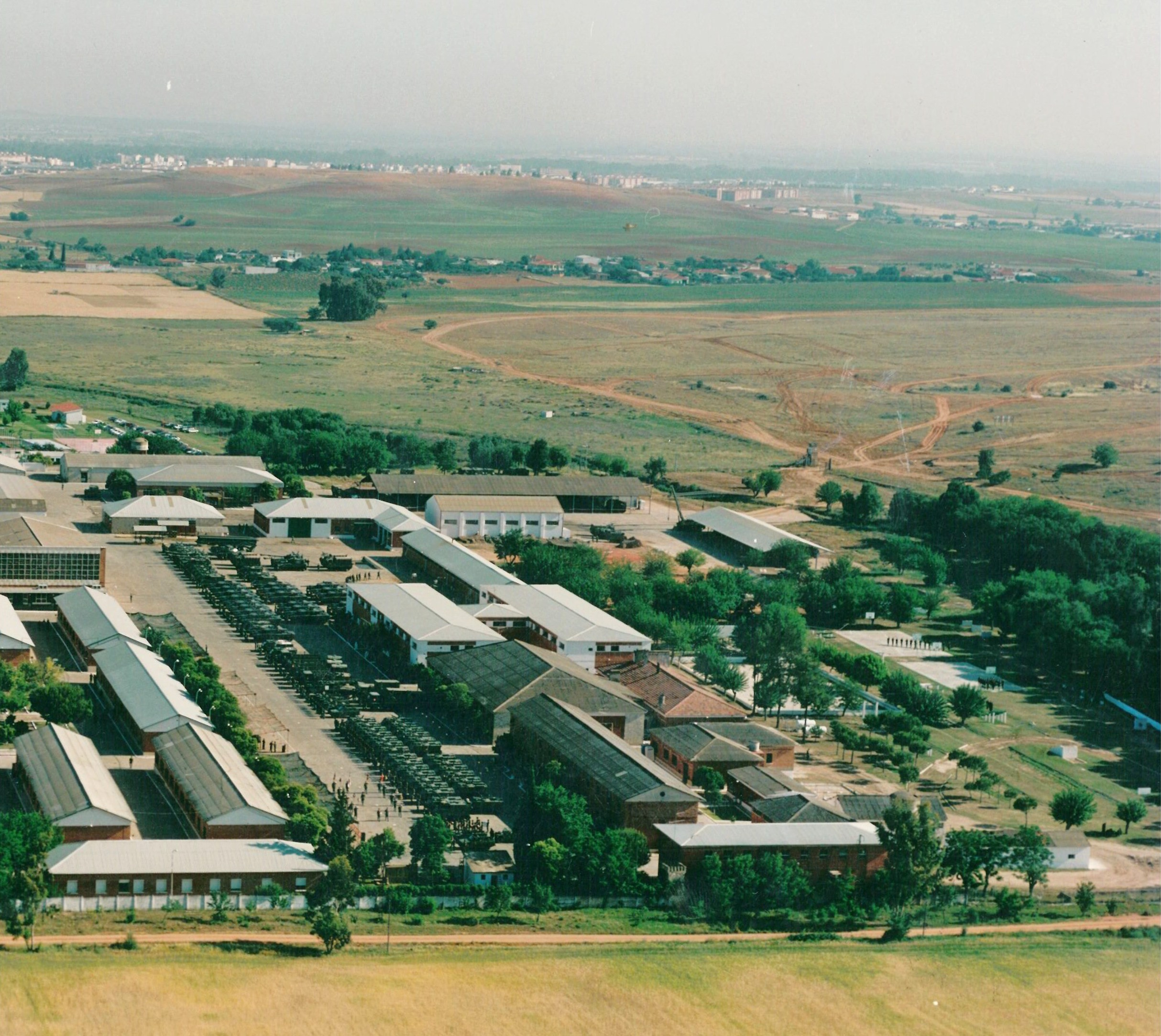
Aerial view of the Sancha Brava Barracks, on the outskirts of Badajoz, the regiment's base from 1966 to 1999.

The first barracks of the "Mechanized Infantry Regiment Castilla No. 16" was Sancha Brava, located about 4 km from the city of Badajoz. Until the change in designation due to the incorporation of tanks, it was occupied by its predecessor, the 16th Infantry Regiment "Castilla", from which all mechanical and logistical assets, as well as officers, non-commissioned officers, and troops, were drawn.

Its first commander from February 17, 1966, was Lieutenant Colonel Adolfo Rovira Recio. On November 17, Colonel Fidel Cátera Román took command of the regiment, appointed by Circular Order of October 28, published in Official Gazette No. 245. He received command from Lieutenant Colonel Adolfo Rovira Recio, who was relinquishing command due to his promotion to colonel.

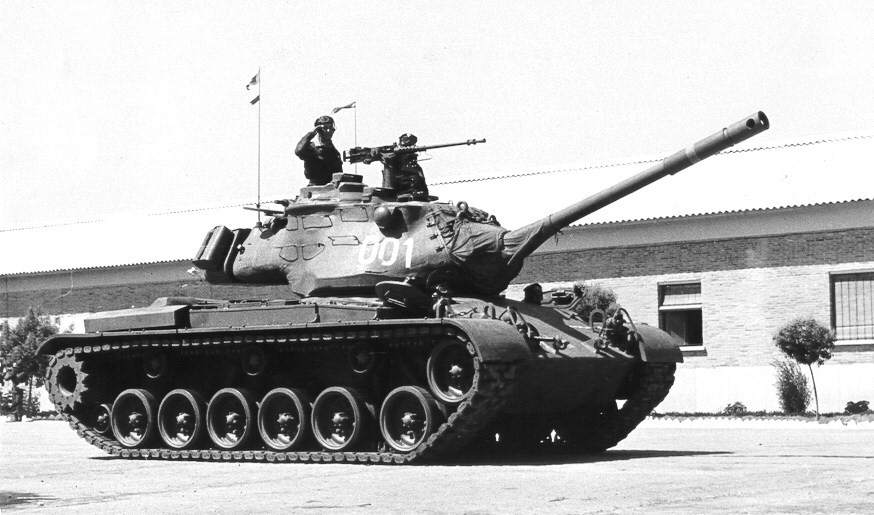
Lieutenant Colonel Adolfo Rovira Recio aboard the tank M47 Patton No. 001 during a parade in 1972.

In 1967, the regiment received its first 16 M47 Patton tanks from the Sagunto Cavalry Regiment, distributed among the battalion’s various companies. The American M-47 tank, manufactured since 1951, was first operated in the Spanish Army by the Armoured Division No. 1 "Brunete". The M-47 had the following characteristics: an engine with 810 cv equivalent to approximately 800 HP, a maximum speed of 48 km/h, a range of 128 km, and armament consisting of a 90 mm cannon, a 12.70 mm machine gun, and two 7.62 mm machine guns.

In the first quarter of 1967, another thirteen M-47 tanks arrived, and in April, the regiment deployed to Cerro Muriano, Córdoba, to participate in Operation Saeta, conducted by the XXI Mechanized Infantry Brigade under General Pedro Merry Gordon, involving a live-fire offensive. In October of that year, additional mechanized equipment arrived: Thirty-four all-terrain vehicles with all-wheel drive came from the Córdoba Automobile Base, and thirteen M-47 tanks, as well as a crane truck for maintenance, came from the Segovia Mixed Base of Tractors and Tanks.

By late 1967, the demolition of the old San Francisco Barracks began, where a cypress tree known as the "Castilla Sentinel" still stood, its condition deteriorating due to lack of irrigation and pruning. A unanimous request from civil society, led by the local newspaper Hoy and spearheaded by journalist Antonio García Orio Zabala—a former provisional sergeant of the first battalion of "Castilla No. 16"—resulted in General Pedro Merry Gordon authorizing a company of sappers from the "Engineer Battalion" to uproot the cypress and transplant it to the Sancha Brava Barracks, where it was placed to the right of the chapel.

=== "La Hispanidad" Battalion ===
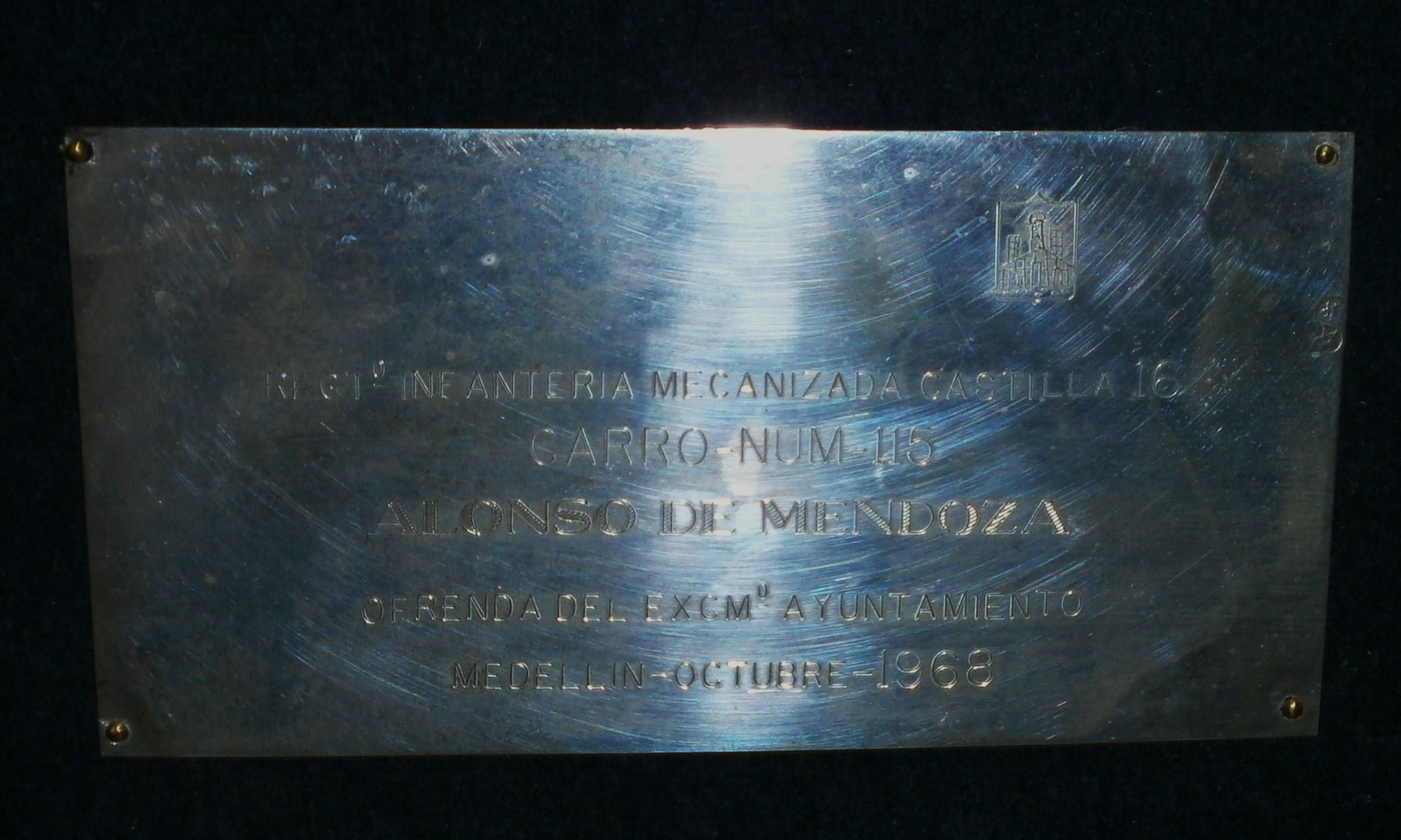
The Medellín City Council presented a plaque to the RIMZ Castilla No. 16 in recognition of their sponsorship of tank No. 115, which was named "Alonso de Mendoza."

On November 10, 1968, a significant event occurred in the regiment: Extremadura and the Institute of Hispanic Culture paid tribute to the Spanish Army, symbolized on this occasion by the Mechanized Infantry Regiment Castilla No. 16. The event was used to bless and present a banner offered by the Badajoz City Council to the regiment. At 11 a.m., the Captain General of the II Military Region, Manuel Chamorro Martínez, arrived. After attending Holy Mass, the standard-bearers marched to their positions in front of the formation. Following a speech by the colonel, the fusilier company fired a volley, and while the national anthem played, the flag and standards were retired to their designated room. A parade of the forces followed, with the M-47 tank battalion, each tank named after an Extremaduran conquistador, closing the event. This battalion was thus named the "La Hispanidad Battalion." Representatives from the towns attended the event, presenting silver plaques with the names of the conquistadors born in their towns, along with the number of the sponsored tank, the town’s coat of arms, and a medal of the town’s patron saint, whose names were already displayed on the tanks’ prows.

Conquistador’s Name	Place of Origin	Sponsored Tank Number	Achievements
Pedro Alvarado	Badajoz	No. 111	Conquistador of Guatemala
Andrés de Tapia de Alvarado	Badajoz	No. 123	Conquistador in Mexico
Luis de Moscoso Alvarado	Badajoz	No. 212	Leader of the expedition to Florida after Hernando de Soto’s death
Arias Tinoco	Badajoz	No. 215	Conquistador of Florida, commanding the ship Santa Bárbara
Romo de Cardeñosa	Badajoz	No. 233	Conquistador of Florida, commanding the ship San Antón
Juan Núñez de Prado	Badajoz	No. 225	Conquistador in Tucumán
Hernán Sánchez de Badajoz	Badajoz	No. 315	Conquistador of Peru
Alonso Rangel	Aceuchal	No. 134	Conquistador in Costa Rica
Vasco Núñez de Balboa	Jerez de los Caballeros	No. 200	Discoverer of the Pacific Ocean
Hernando Méndez de Soto	Jerez de los Caballeros	No. 211	Conquistador of Florida
Nuño de Tovar	Jerez de los Caballeros	No. 213	Conquistador of Florida, commanding the ship Magdalena
Jaime de Maraver	Jerez de los Caballeros	No. 224	Conquistador of New Spain
Pedro de Valdivia	Castuera	No. 100	Conquistador of Chile
Hernán Cortés	Medellín	No. 001 (unit commander’s tank)	Conquistador of Mexico
Alonso de Mendoza	Medellín	No. 115	Conquistador in Peru
Gonzalo de Sandoval	Medellín	No. 124	Captain in the conquest of Mexico
Rodrigo de Paz	Medellín	No. 132	Conquistador in Mexico
Alonso de Alvarado Montoya	Zafra	No. 321	Conquistador in Guatemala, Mexico, and Peru. Captain General in Potosí and La Plata
Juan Coles	Zafra	No. 201	Conquistador in Florida and chronicler
Benito Hurtado	Garrovillas de Cáceres	No. 112	Conquistador in Castilla de Oro and Nicaragua
Gallego de Andrade	Burguillos del Cerro	No. 012	Conquistador in Mexico, husband of Isabel de Moctezuma
Diego García de Paredes	Barcarrota	No. 214	Conquistador of Florida, commanding the ship San Juan
Juan Ruiz de Arce	Alburquerque	No. 301	Conquistador in Peru and chronicler
Jorge de Alvarado	Lobón	No. 323	Conquistador of Mexico and Guatemala
Diego de Alvarado	Lobón	No. 334	Conquistador in Mexico, Guatemala, and Chile
Juan Cano de Saavedra	Cáceres	No. 011	Captain in the conquest of Mexico
García Holguín	Cáceres	No. 014	Conquistador in Mexico
Vasco Porcallo de Figueroa	Cáceres	No. 222	Conquistador in Florida, Cuba, and Santo Domingo
Francisco de Sande	Cáceres	No. 234	Founder of the Camarines Province of Nueva Cáceres and Governor of the Philippines
Lorenzo de Aldama	Cáceres	No. 002	Conquistador in Peru and Governor of Popayán
Lorenzo de Ulloa	Cáceres	No. 331	Conquistador in Peru, Jamaica, and Honduras
Carrillo de Obando	Cáceres	No. 332	Governor of Muso de Palma, Colombia
Pedro Corbacho	Cáceres	No. 335	Navigator with Columbus on the first voyage to the Indies
Francisco Pizarro	Trujillo	No. 300	Conquistador of Peru
Francisco de Orellana	Trujillo	No. 121	Discoverer of the Amazon River
Juan de Chaves	Trujillo	No. 101	Conquistador in Mexico and Honduras
Diego de Sanabria	Trujillo	No. 113	Adelantado of the Río de la Plata
Diego García de Paredes	Trujillo	No. 221	Conquistador in Venezuela, where he founded the city of Trujillo
Ñuflo de Chaves	Trujillo	No. 235	Founder of Santa Cruz de la Sierra and conquistador in Paraguay
Francisco de las Casas	Trujillo	No. 135	Founder of the city of Trujillo in Honduras
Pedro Alonso de Hinojosa	Trujillo	No. 333	Conquistador in Peru and captain general of Lagasca’s army
Gonzalo de Ocampo	Trujillo	No. 324	Conquistador in Santo Domingo and Pánuco
Hernando de Trejo	Trujillo	No. 325	Conquistador in Argentina
Gonzalo Pizarro	Trujillo	No. 131	Leader of the expedition to the Land of Cinnamon
Alonso de Sotomayor	Trujillo	No. 231	Governor and captain general in Chile
Diego Alfonso de Camargo	Plasencia	No. 122	Conquistador in Mexico and Jamaica
Juan de Carvajal	Plasencia	n.º 133	Conquistador in Paraguay.
Cristóbal Flores	Valencia de Alcántara	n.º 125	Conquistador in Mexico.
Gonzalo de Silvestre	Herrera de Alcántara	n.º 222	Conquistador in La Florida.
Nicolás de Ovando	Brozas	n.º 311	First Governor of the Indies.
Diego de Santa Cruz	Guadalupe	n.º 312	Conquistador in Peru.
Martín Cabañas	Logrosán	n.º 313	Conquistador in Peru.
Juan de la Plaza	Hervás	n.º 314	Conquistador in Peru.
Pedro Alonso	Aldeacentenera	n.º 003	Conquistador in Peru.
Antonio Villarroel	Alcántara	n.º 332	Conquistador in Peru, Cuba, and Mexico. Discoverer of the Potosí mines.

=== Operations and activities until the end of the 20th century ===
==== From 1970 to 1980 ====
From April 4 to 9, 1970, as part of the "General Training and Instruction Program," the regiment participated in tactical exercises named Operation Zújar, alongside other forces from Mérida, such as the GACA and GLOG XXI, and from Córdoba, in addition to the Castilla n.º 16 and BMING XXI from Badajoz. In May, it took part in maneuvers called Operation Brigadier in Arcos de la Frontera, where live fire was conducted with all standard weapons, including tanks. Between May and October, up to ten "Officer Patrols" were carried out, which were guerrilla warfare exercises in the areas of Olivenza and Alconchel. The regiment underwent ten inspections of various kinds and participated in external events such as Holy Week, Corpus Christi, and a tribute to the patron saint, the Immaculate Conception, at the church of the same name in central Badajoz, among others. The year 1971 proceeded similarly, with guerrilla warfare exercises conducted in the El Pedroso area in the Province of Seville. That year, the regiment received two significant visits: on February 17, the Captain General of the II Military Region, Julio Coloma Gallego, inspected the regiment, and in June, the Minister of the Army, General Juan Castañón de Mena, visited. On both occasions, the regiment's commanders were commended for "the martial bearing, presentation, and condition of the regiment."

In 1972, the regiment continued its garrison duties and participated in various tactical exercises, notably Operation Lanza, conducted in Cerro Muriano (Córdoba) alongside other units of the "Guzmán el Bueno" Division from April 7 to 12. By 1973, the regiment had 54 M47 Patton tanks, 26 trucks, and 52 all-wheel-drive vehicles that replaced outdated models. Regarding weaponry, the most notable addition was 50 12.7 mm machine guns. In February and March, a "Training and Knowledge Course for the M113-A1" was held, including water-crossing exercises at the Piedra Aguda reservoir, as the delivery of these armored personnel carriers was scheduled two months later, which occurred as planned. In June, 49 M113-A1s were received, and by late November, navigation exercises were conducted on the Guadiana River near Badajoz. In September, the regiment participated in the "Hornachos-73" maneuvers, with French and Portuguese military observers present. After the exercises, the participating units paraded before the Minister of the Army, General Francisco Coloma Gallegos, and the then Prince of Spain, Juan Carlos I.

In 1974, several deficiencies became evident, particularly the limited size of the training and firing range for practicing with the available equipment and weapons. The most significant maneuvers were Operation Diana-74 in Talarrubias, involving the entire regiment, and "Otoño-74" in Algeciras. More modern APC units, models M-577-A1 and M-125-A1, were received. In 1975, General Franco died, and Juan Carlos I was named King of Spain. Meanwhile, the Kingdom of Morocco organized the Green March to penetrate the Spanish Sahara and pressure the Spanish government to negotiate the transfer of the territory to the African nation. The Peace Agreement of Madrid ended Spain's presence in the region, avoiding a war that, according to Gutiérrez Mellado, "would not have been winnable."

In 1976, the regiment left its base three times: once to Chinchilla (Albacete) for the "Montearagón 76" exercise, and twice to Cerro Muriano. It also conducted maneuvers in Alburquerque for the "Gévora 76" exercise and near the Virgin of Botoa hermitage for the "Zapatón 76" exercise. Several M-47 tanks were decommissioned that year and replaced with modified M-47Es that ran on diesel. In the following years, the regiment continued its regular training and maneuver exercises, but the terrorist attacks by ETA began to take a toll on the armed forces. Following the assassination of General Ortín Gil on January 3, 1980, the Castilla n.º 16 tank battalion, like other garrisons, deployed its forces onto the streets of Badajoz, following a route through Valverde road, Europa Avenue, Ramón y Cajal Avenue, San Roque, Madrid road, and back to the "Sancha Brava" barracks.

==== From 1981 to the relocation to General Menacho Base ====
On February 23, 1981, a coup d'état took place. Days earlier, the tank battalion was conducting maneuvers in Cerro Muriano and received orders to return immediately to their barracks, arriving the following day. Thus, on the day of the assault on the Congress, the regiment was fully stationed at its usual Sancha Brava barracks. Around midnight on February 23, all commanders were summoned, and all vehicles were refueled and armed. However, the King's message at around 3 a.m. alleviated the tension and uncertainty.

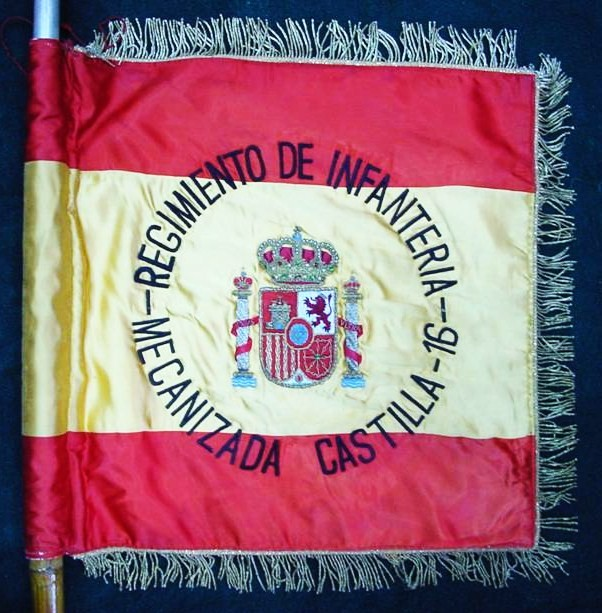
Banner of the RIMZ Castilla n.º 16

In 1982, the Minister of Defence, Alberto Oliart, visited on February 5. In 1983, the regiment celebrated the centenary of its arrival in Badajoz, and the M47 Patton tanks were replaced with the AMX-30E (Spanish version of the French AMX-30), which had superior performance, featuring a Hispano-Suiza 680 hp engine, a maximum speed of 65 km/h, a range of about 500 km, and was armed with a 105 mm cannon, a 12.7 mm machine gun, and a 7.62 mm machine gun. Another milestone was the presentation of a new banner to the regiment by the Badajoz City Council, featuring the constitutional coat of arms. The previous banner was donated to the Museum of the Army but was later returned to the city council for safekeeping. Between June and September, the regiment participated in the "Castelar-83" and "Pedrera-83" maneuvers in San Gregorio and Chinchilla, respectively, as well as the "Crisex-83" maneuvers in Huelva. In 1985, Gustavo Urrutia García, Captain General of the I Military Region, visited, and that year, the Brigade XI, headquartered on Fernando Calzadilla Avenue next to the Gravelinas Military Residence, relocated to the fields of Bótoa, about 22 km from Badajoz, where all smaller units of the brigade eventually converged, with the RIMZ Castilla n.º 16 being the last to join the General Menacho Base.

The following years were marked by continued training both within and outside the barracks. In 1987, the regiment participated in the "Alfa-2" and "Beta" maneuvers in the San Gregorio fields in Zaragoza. On June 1, the regiment celebrated its 194th anniversary, attended by senior Spanish and Portuguese military officials. In mid-October, a section exchange with the British Army took place as part of the "Hispano-British Activities." In 1988, the regiment moved to the San Lorenzo maneuver field for the "Aragón-88" tactical exercises. In 1989, the "Beta-101," "Beta-107," and "Beta-109" maneuvers were conducted. The next two years followed a routine of discipline and daily work. In 1991, Operation Escudo was carried out to guard the dams of the García Sola Reservoir and Cíjara Reservoir in the Guadiana River Basin. In April, the "Águila 2/91" exercises were held in Chinchilla (Albacete), and in November, the "Puisemilla-91" maneuvers took place.

In 1992, the Fifth Centenary of the Discovery of America was celebrated, and Operation Alfa-Foxtrot was conducted to protect specific sections of the Spanish High-Speed Rail route between Madrid and Seville. The regiment also participated in a new type of exercise called "ENEAS." The most significant event of that year was the visit of His Majesty King Juan Carlos I to the barracks in May. In 1993, the AMX-30E tanks were replaced with the American M60 A3 TTS, which were larger and more powerful, with a 750 hp engine, and 310 units were delivered to Spain. That year, to celebrate the Compostela Holy Year, a relay march was organized from the headquarters of Brigades XI and XII and the division itself to Santiago de Compostela, named "Corazeiro-93," covering nearly 800 km in four days. Regarding weaponry, a significant change was the replacement of the old Cetme C assault rifle with the lighter and more precise Cetme L. In 1994, under the United Nations mandate to contribute troops to the pacification of the former Yugoslavia, the Castilla n.º 16 deployed to Bosnia-Herzegovina on March 22 and to Croatia via a direct flight from the Talavera la Real Air Base in Badajoz. The rest of the regiment participated with Italian and American troops in the combined "Dinamic-Impact 94" exercise in the Vivaro area of the Province of Pordenone, Italy, and in the "Beta-106" tactical exercises.

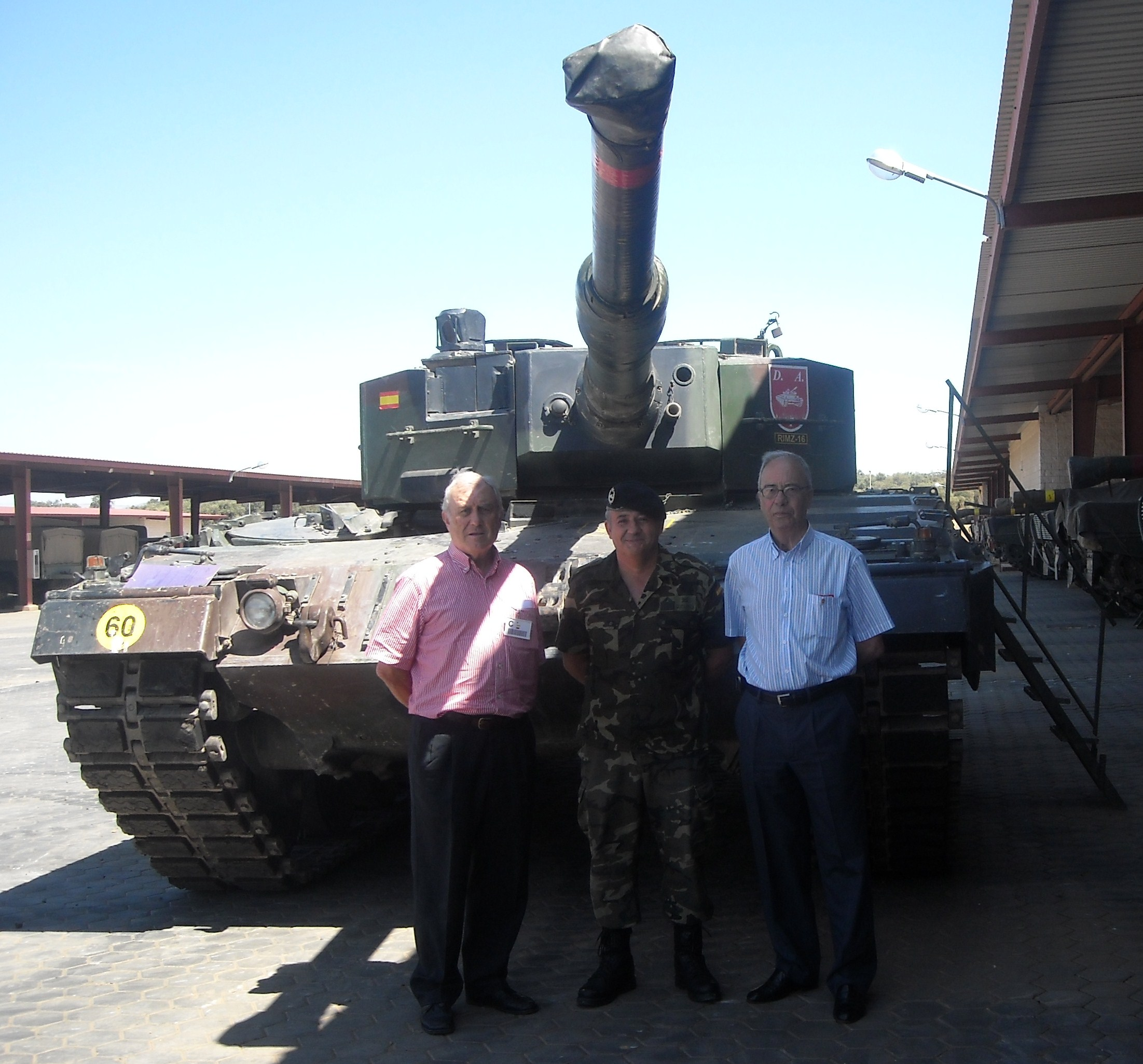
Leopard 2A4 battle tank of the 16th Castilla Mechanized Infantry Regiment

The year 1995 was significant for equipment upgrades, as the first Leopard 2 A4 tanks were received to replace the M60 tanks, with replacements continuing in 1996 and 1997. In 1997, troops were sent on peacekeeping missions to the former Yugoslavia, and those stationed in Bosnia-Herzegovina returned in 1998. That year, part of the regiment traveled to France and Germany to participate in the "Pegasus-98" exercises.

==== Reasons for the relocation to General Menacho Base ====
As early as 1974, the shortcomings of the Sancha Brava barracks became evident, particularly regarding the shooting and maneuver range. The firing range did not allow the use of grenade launchers except with training grenades. For firing with a 60 mm mortar, only the first charge could be used, with a maximum range of 300 m. When using a 120 mm mortar, it had to be fitted with a reduced 60 mm sub-caliber. Since all military units in the Badajoz garrison used this range, the regiment's companies could only use it once a month. The training field also showed deficiencies, as its limited size restricted tactical exercises to the subgroup or company level, necessitating repetition due to the constrained terrain.

In 1975, an accident occurred in which a civilian was injured by a ricochet of shrapnel in the opposite direction of the usual firing "backstop." As a result, the Civil Governor appointed an investigative and advisory commission on the future use of the firing range. The commission's conclusions were:

- Firing was permitted only in the northernmost part of the range.
- The maximum firing distance was not to exceed 50 m.
- Automatic firing with individual weapons was prohibited; shots had to be fired one at a time.
- Collective weapons had to have a "rigid mount."
- The use of the 12.7 mm machine gun was banned.

These restrictions highlighted the unsuitability of the site for conducting maneuvers and exercises with the new weaponry available.

Another argument for a new location was the dispersion of the smaller units comprising the Mechanized Infantry Brigade "Extremadura" XI (BRIMZ Extremadura XI), which had its headquarters in what later became the Gravelinas Military Residence in central Badajoz, in addition to any strictly confidential and internal reasons the government of the time might have had. The headquarters of the Mechanized Infantry Brigade "Extremadura" XI was the first to relocate to the General Menacho Base in 1985, in Bótoa, about 20 km from Badajoz. Over the next 15 years, all smaller units of the "Brigade XI" gradually relocated to Bótoa. The "RIMZ Castilla n.º 16" was the last to join the new base in 1999.

==== Establishment at the General Menacho Base ====
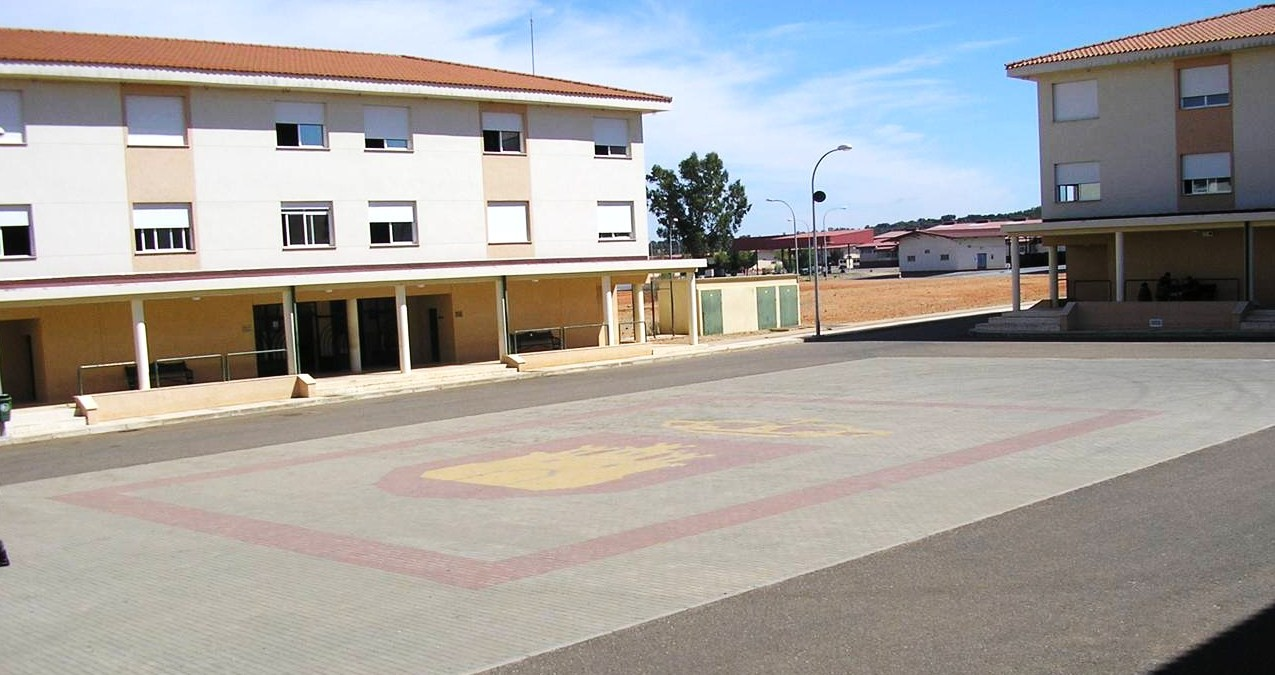
Courtyard of the command area at the General Menacho Base

On June 30, 1999, the final "Sancha Brava Barracks Order" was published, consisting of a single article that began as follows:

On the eve of the regiment's relocation to the General Menacho Base (Bótoa), we take another step today by publishing the last "order" of our Sancha Brava Barracks.
I wish to take this opportunity to reiterate that once again, Castilla is being put to the test. I am confident that, as always, we will fulfill our duty without fail...
Ultimately, all this without losing, but rather proudly maintaining, our identity and pride as Soldiers of Castilla.

— Your Colonel Mollá.

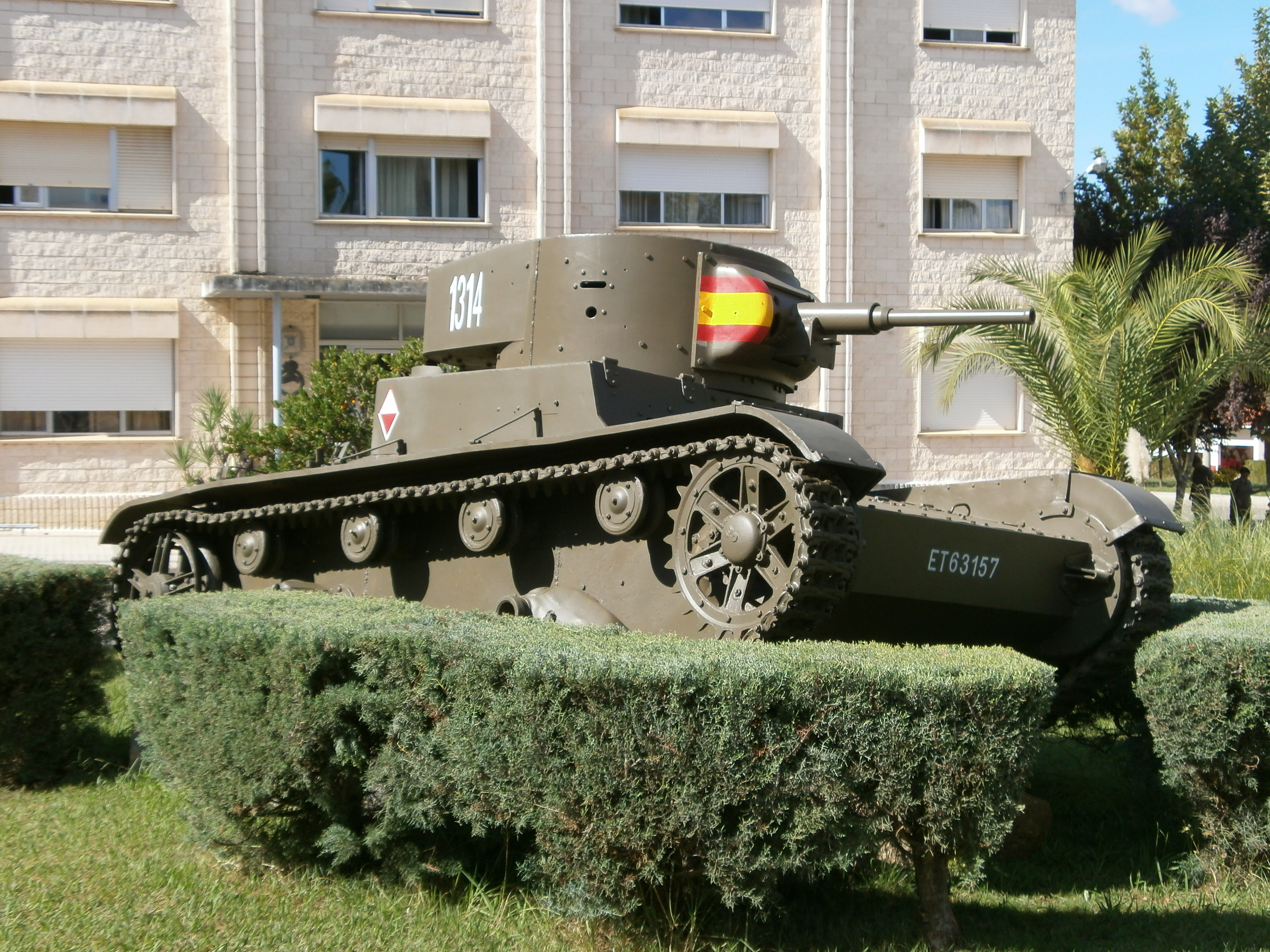
T-26-B1 tank in the command courtyard of the General Menacho Base in Bótoa, Badajoz

The relocation was carried out in three phases: on July 1, the "BIMZ Alcántara" moved; on September 1, the "BICC Mérida" followed; and by October 1, the entire regiment was at the General Menacho Base in Bótoa. That same year, the tank battalion paraded in Madrid on National Day of Spain and immediately proceeded to conduct the "Bótoa-99" exercises. The year 2000 began with the regiment fully settled and acclimated to the new base. In June, it traveled to the familiar San Gregorio maneuver field in Zaragoza to participate in the "Ejea 2000" and "Cierzo 2000" exercises (named after the northwest wind that frequently blows through the Ebro Valley). The name Cierzo was given to the end-of-course tactical exercises at the General Military Academy, attended by various army units where cadet ensigns in their final year, soon to become lieutenants, practiced command. Delayed by a few days due to the deployment of two battalions to Zaragoza, the regiment celebrated its 207th anniversary. In March 2001, two battalions traveled to the same Zaragoza maneuver field for training and firing exercises. That year, taking advantage of the facilities at the General Menacho Base maneuver field, four "ALFA-2" type exercises were conducted. In July, the regiment celebrated the 208th anniversary of its founding. Once established in its new barracks and adapted to the operational differences between a single-regiment barracks and a base shared with multiple units under a general's command, the regiment's military life continued with complete normalcy.

==== Armament received in 2015 ====
As part of the combat equipment renewal plan, the Leopard 2-A4 tanks were replaced with the more modern Leopard 2E, partially manufactured and fully assembled in Spain, which were incorporated into the regiment on March 22, 2015. Its main mechanical and firepower characteristics are:

- Manufactured by General Dynamics in Seville.
- Crewed by four personnel.
- Its primary weapon is a 155x55 mm cannon.
- The secondary armament includes two 7.62-mm caliber MG machine guns, one coaxial with the cannon and the other for immediate anti-aircraft defense.
- Equipped with 16 smoke grenade launchers for evasion and concealment from the enemy.
- Its combat weight is 62 tons.
- Its maximum speed is 68 km/h.
- Its engine power is 1500 hp.
- Features a more advanced optical and electronic system than its predecessor, the Leopard 2 A4.
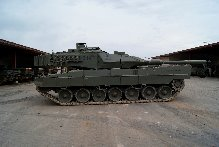
Right side view.

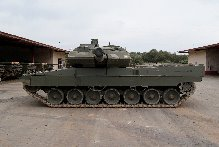
Side view with turret rotated 90º.

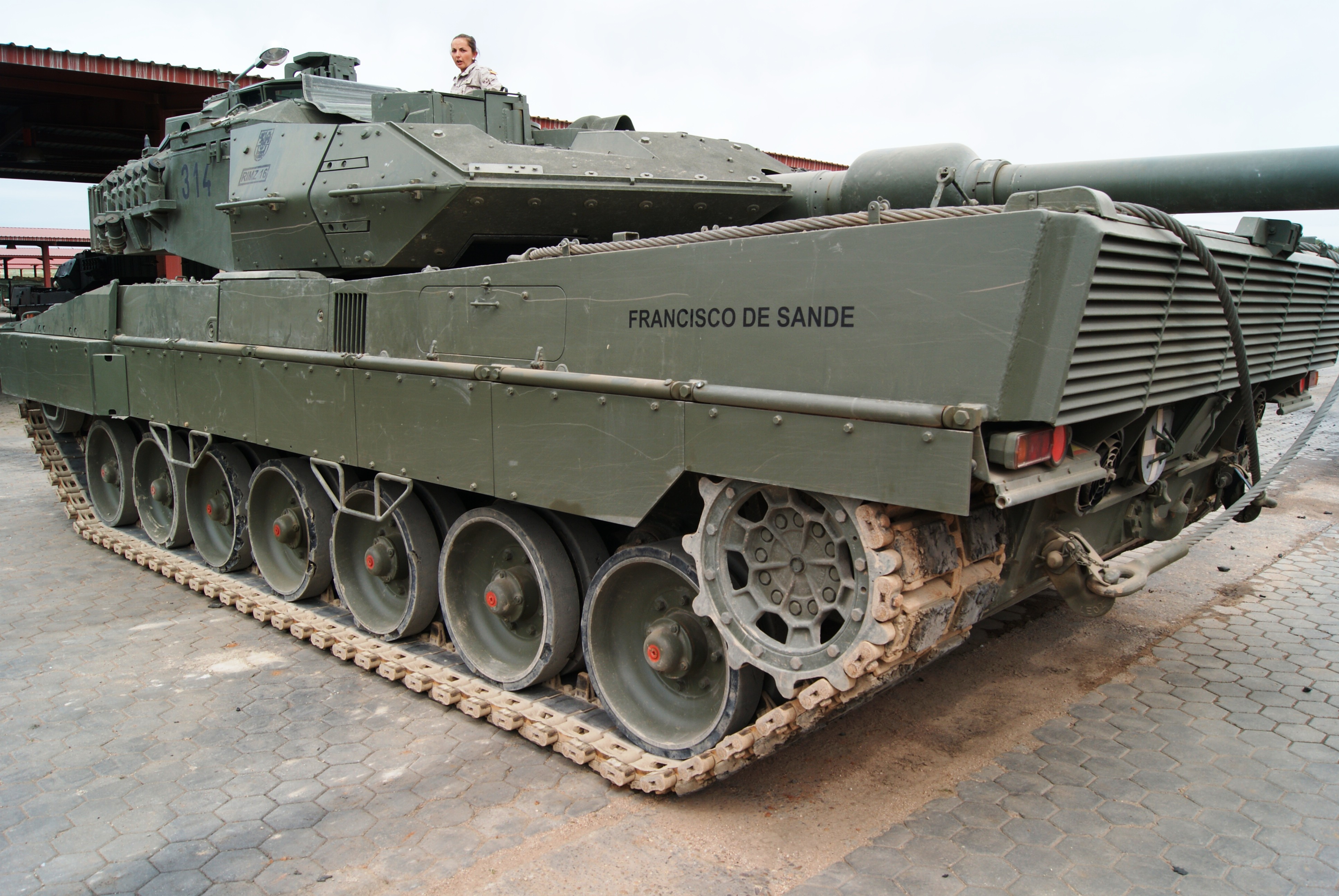
Tank "Francisco de Sande," 3/4 right view with driver in the turret.

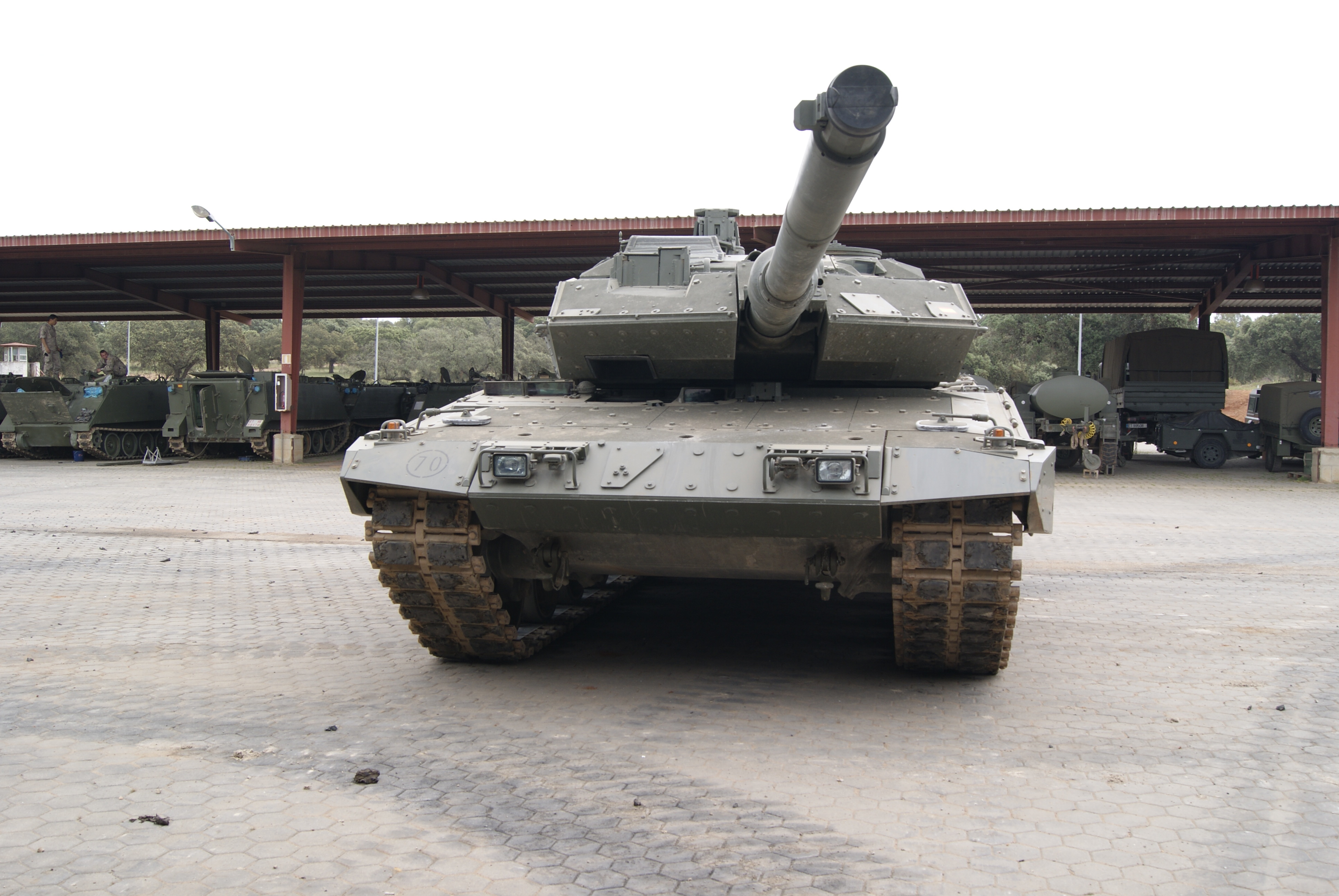
Front view with cannon aligned with the tank.

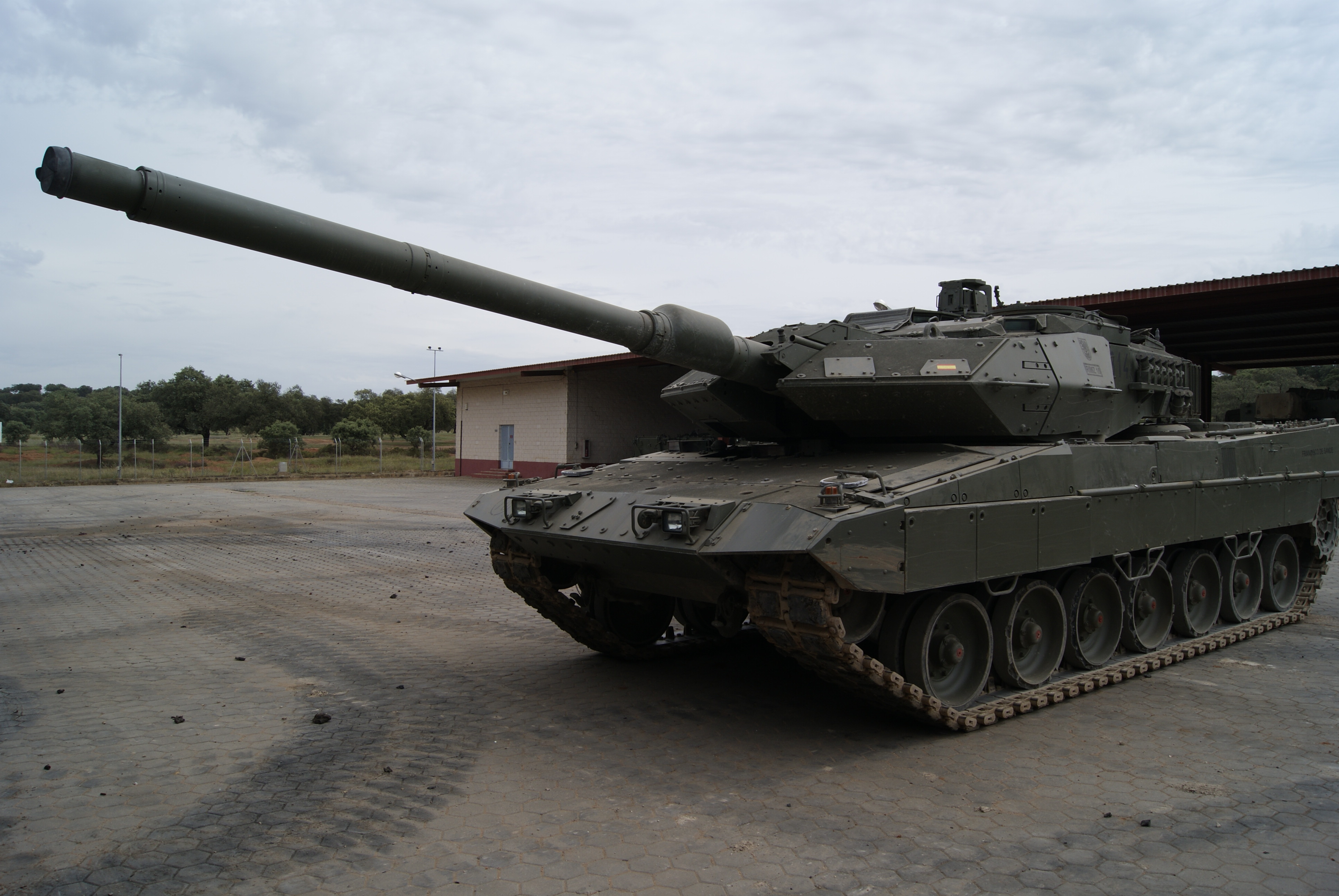
Left side view with cannon aligned with the tank.

== Peacekeeping missions ==
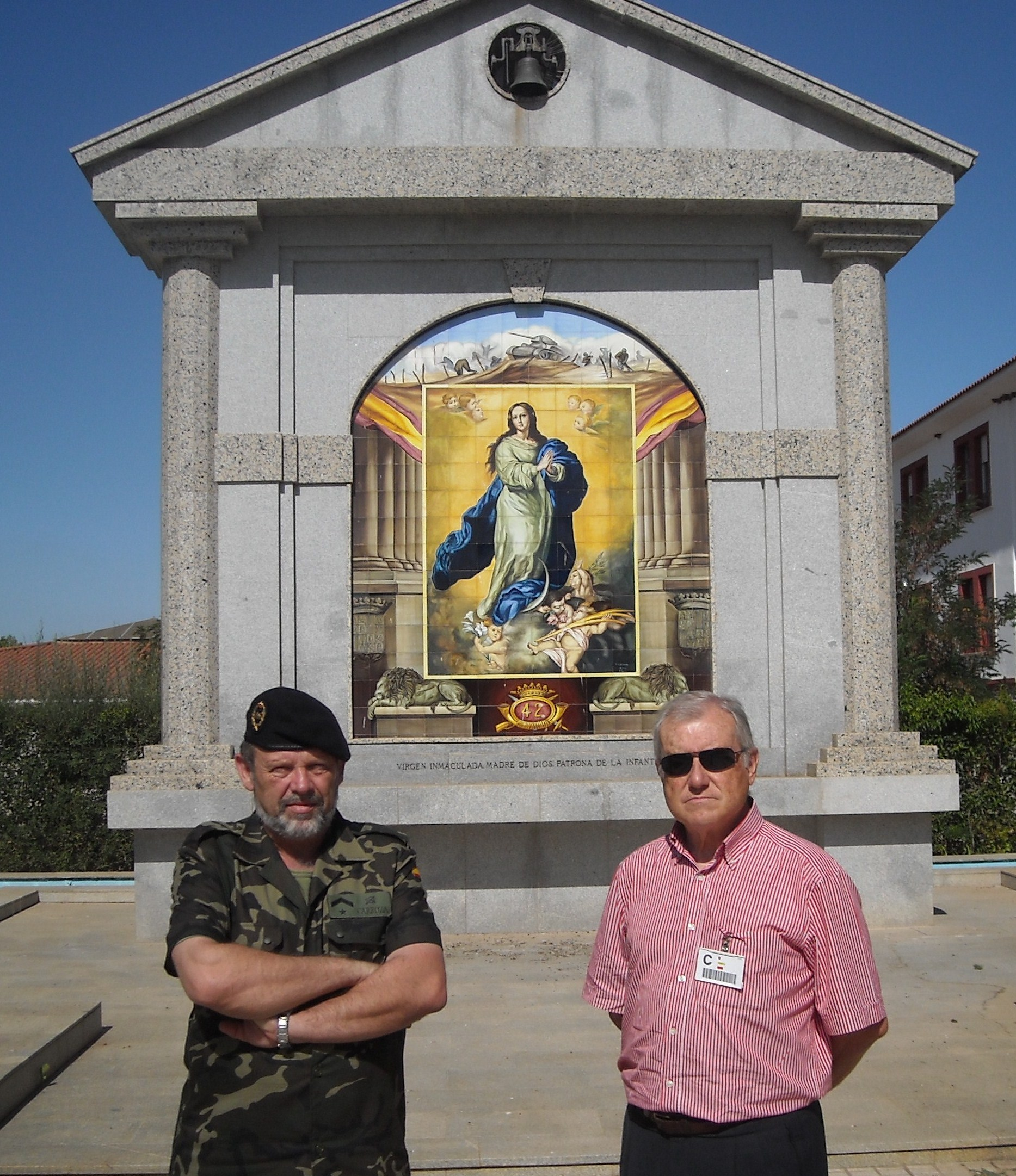
Monument to the Immaculate Conception at the regiment's base

The regiment participated in numerous peacekeeping missions between 1993 and 2012, with the most significant listed below:

- El Salvador. Three of the five officers in Spain's advisory group were from the regiment and served in El Salvador throughout 1993. Their mission, called "United Nations Observers in El Salvador" (ONUSAL), established by a United Nations resolution, was to monitor the Chapultepec Peace Accords, which involved disarming the guerrilla to end the civil war through negotiations between the government and the Farabundo Martí National Liberation Front (FMLN).
- Bosnia and Herzegovina. Córdoba Tactical Group (AGT Córdoba) (SPAGT). This group was not based on the "Rapid Action Forces" as previous missions had been. From March to October 1994, a company from the "RIMZ Castilla n.º 16," commanded by Captain Martín Francisco Expósito Alonso, was deployed in Bosnia and Herzegovina. The unit, named "2nd Castilla Company," was part of the "Princesa Battalion" of the "AGT Córdoba," led by Colonel Pedro Luis Braña under the UN UNPROFOR. Their mission was to ensure compliance with the ceasefire between Bosnian Muslims and Bosnian Croats. Their operational areas were Mostar and Dračevo, and they escorted approximately 2,400 convoys.
- Bosnia and Herzegovina. Extremadura Tactical Group (AGT Extremadura) (SPAGT). The "RIMZ Castilla n.º 16" was designated the "Base Unit" to form the "AGT Extremadura," with a similar mission to previous ones, specifically focused on keeping access routes to Sarajevo open for supplies. They were deployed from October 1994 to May 1995 under the command of Colonel Francisco García-Almenta Dobón. Approximately 250 regiment personnel participated, operating in Mostar, Medjugorje, and Dračevo.
- Yugoslavia. Spanish Brigade V (SPABRI V). From May to December 1997, 29 officers and non-commissioned officers and 76 soldiers from the "RIMZ Castilla n.º 16" were stationed at the "General Menacho Base" to form part of the "Spanish Brigade V" (SPABRI V) for peacekeeping missions, particularly during municipal and legislative elections in the former Yugoslavia. This mission included an "Electronic Warfare Unit."
- Bosnia and Herzegovina. Spanish Brigade VIII (SPABRI VIII). From August to December 1998, personnel from the "RIMZ Castilla n.º 16" participated in peacekeeping missions in Bosnia and Herzegovina as part of the "Spanish Brigade VIII" (SPABRI VIII). Their primary mission was to monitor elections to ensure they proceeded smoothly and to provide security in the settlements of Stolac.
- Bosnia and Herzegovina. Spanish Operational Organization XII (SPAGT XII). From December 1999 to April 2000, several members of the "RIMZ Castilla n.º 16," led by Colonel Mollá, were deployed to oversee compliance with peace agreements and assist in the resettlement of refugees. They also helped create a secure environment that allowed the second local elections to proceed without incident.
- Bosnia and Herzegovina. Spanish Operational Organization XIV (SPAGT XIV). A section of the "RIMZ Castilla n.º 16," commanded by Lieutenant Antonio Jiménez, participated from July to December 2000 in verifying compliance with the Dayton Accords in Bosnia and Herzegovina, supporting the resettlement of refugees, the refurbishment of schools and clinics, and taking part in demining the terrain.
- Bosnia and Herzegovina. Spanish Operational Organization XVI (SPAGT XVI). From May to December 2001, the "RIMZ Castilla n.º 16" was designated the "Main Unit" to form the "Spanish Operational Organization SPAGT XVI." It contributed a battalion named "Badajoz Battalion" with 245 personnel out of a total of 769. They continued monitoring compliance with the Dayton Accords, refurbished workshops and schools, provided medical services to over 1,200 people, and delivered more than 1,000 cubic meters of drinking water. Their operational areas were the cities of Trebinje and Mostar.
- Kosovo. Spanish Tactical Group X (KSPAGT X). Most members of this group belonged to the "BRIMZ Extremadura XI." The mission lasted from September 2003 to April 2004, led by Colonel Martín Aragonés of the "RIMZ Castilla n.º 16," and focused on maintaining the peace process in Kosovo alongside the Kosovo Force (KFOR). The group was based in Doboj East.
- Iraq. Hispano-Polish Multinational Brigade Plus Ultra II. Based on the "BRIMZ Extremadura XI," this brigade was deployed from December 2003 to April 2004. Colonel Asarta, head of the "RIMZ Castilla n.º 16," served as the brigade's second-in-command. The RIMZ Castilla n.º 16 was integrated into the Staff and Logistics units and contributed a rifle company.
- Indonesia. Solidarity Response Operation. Soldier Miguel Carroza Gallardo from the RIMZ Castilla n.º 16 participated as a volunteer medic from January to March 2005 in the Solidarity Response Operation, traveling on the ship Galicia from Alicante to Banda Aceh, the area most affected by the December 26, 2004 tsunami.
- Kosovo. Spanish Tactical Group XV (KSPAGT XV). From January to July 2006, the "RIMZ Castilla n.º 16" was once again designated the "Base Unit" under Colonel Nicolás de Bari Millán Cruz to form the KSPAGT XV. The regiment contributed over 300 personnel, including officers and troops.
- Lebanon. Free Hidalgo IV Operation. From November 2007 to March 2008, the regiment, alongside the Light Armored Cavalry Regiment "Numancia n.º 9," participated in the Operation Free Hidalgo Brigade IV to enforce United Nations Security Council resolutions in the area. Their base was the Spanish "Miguel de Cervantes" base near Marjayoun.
- Lebanon. Free Hidalgo X Operation. The "RIMZ Castilla n.º 16" was part of the "Eastern Multinational Brigade" with personnel from countries such as India, Indonesia, and Nepal in the Free Hidalgo X Operation from December 2009 to April 2010. Several officers, non-commissioned officers, and troops participated in "Command, Management, and Logistics" roles to maintain peace along the Lebanon-Israel border, with the headquarters in An-Naqoura, southern Lebanon.
- Lebanon. Free Hidalgo XV Operation. For the third time, the regiment was deployed to Lebanon from September 2011 for five months as part of the "Multinational Brigade" named Free Hidalgo XV, performing the same border protection duties along the Lebanon-Israel border near the Litani River mouth. The operation included military personnel from Indonesia, Malaysia, India, Nepal, Serbia, and El Salvador.
- Lebanon. Free Hidalgo XX Operation. Starting November 12, 2013, the transition between the Free Hidalgo XIX and Free Hidalgo XX contingents took place, with the Mechanized Infantry Brigade (BRIMZ) Extremadura XI continuing until May 2014 with tasks assigned by the United Nations under "Resolution 1701." This contingent included sixteen men and women from the "RIMZ Castilla n.º 16" performing "Command and Logistics Support" roles. On March 19, 2014, soldier Carlos Martínez Gutiérrez from the Mechanized Infantry Brigade Extremadura XI died in the line of duty at Hammoud Hospital in Sidon (Lebanon), where he had been admitted since March 12.

== Commanders of the regiment ==
The commanders of the regiment since it became a "mechanized unit" in 1966 are as follows:

1966 - Fidel Cátedra Román	1970 - Gervasio Martín Cotano	1972 - Juan Camacho Collazo	1976 - Leandro Blanco González	1980 - José Cruz Requejo	1980 - Pedro Vallespín González-Valdés	1981 - Carlos Torres Espiga	1984 - Hermenegildo García Briones
1985 - Celestino Sanz Hurtado de Mendoza	1987 - Tomás Quecedo González	1989 - José Gallego del Pueyo	1991 - Oliverio Celemín Peña	1993 - Francisco M. García Almenta Dobón	1995 - Juan José Antolín Heriz	1997 - José Manuel Mollá Ayuso	
1999 - Alfonso Guillén Regodón	2001 - Luis Martín Aragonés	2003 - Alberto Asarta Cuevas	2005 - Nicolás de Bari Millán Cruz	2007 - Santiago Cubas Roig	2009 - Jerónimo de Gregorio y Monmeneu	2011 - Pedro José Cabanach Villa	
2013 - José Rivas Moriana

== Anthem of the regiment ==
The regiment's anthem was composed by Bonifacio Gil in 1924. The original score is preserved in the museum of the RIMZ Castilla No. 16 in Bótoa (Badajoz). Bonifacio Gil began his military career as a drummer in the "La Lealtad" regiment in Burgos, later served as a first-class musician in the "Zamora Regiment" in Ferrol, and successfully passed the competitive examination to become a director of military bands, achieving the top rank. He eventually attained the rank of commander and director of music. He was assigned to the regiment from 1924 to 1947. During this period, he devoted himself to compiling Extremaduran folklore, and the Badajoz Provincial Council published his work titled Cancionero popular de Extremadura in two volumes. He also served as the director of the Badajoz Music Conservatory. The lyrics were written by Captain José Castillo. The anthem is as follows:

I am a soldier of the 16th Castilla Regiment I must appear content and joyful	Happy to be a soldier in a homeland of freedoms freedoms won with blood shed to the cry of "Long live Spain!"	Attack, attack attack with valor know how to win or die
For honor and manliness the Spanish soldier must preserve his history more than his life or glory	Our motto is to always be faithful. I promise to shout with energy, knowing how to win or die. CASTILLA was always like that.	Lyrics by Captain José Castillo; Music by Bonifacio Gil

== Name change of the regiment ==
By order of the Official Bulletin of the Ministry of Defence on July 2, 2015, the Mechanized Infantry Regiment Castilla n.º 16 lost the "Mechanized Infantry" designation and was renamed the Armored Regiment Castilla n.º 16, while retaining the name "Castilla" from its founding in 1793, continuing to be part of the Extremadura XI Brigade as it had been until that time.

== See also ==
- Spanish Army

== Bibliography ==
- Carroza Luengo, Miguel (2011). "Volume No. 4". Diarios y archivos [Diaries and Archives]. Badajoz: Miguel Carroza. pp. multiple.
- de Cieza de León, Pedro (2011). "Volume No. III". Obras completas [Complete Works] (1st ed.). Madrid: Consejo Superior de Investigaciones Científicas (CSIC). pp. multiple. ISBN 9788400061159.
- García Ramos, Antonio (1987). Regimiento de Infantería Mecanizada Castilla núm. 16 [Mechanized Infantry Regiment Castilla No. 16] (1st ed.). Badajoz: RIMZ Castilla n.º 16. p. 214. OCLC 434907804.
- García Ramos, Antonio; et al. (2001). Memoria de una epopeya [Memory of an Epic] (1st ed.). Badajoz: RIMZ Castilla n.º 16. p. 630. OCLC 433018623.
- García Aranda, Antonio (2001). Nuevas lecturas de La Florida del Inca [New Readings of The Inca's Florida] (1st ed.). Madrid: Iberoamericana. p. 327. ISBN 9788484893578.
- Gravalos González, Luis; Calvo Pérez, José Luis (1988). Condecoraciones militares españolas [Spanish Military Decorations] (1st ed.). San Martín. p. 400. ISBN 84-7140-266-1.
- Picatoste, Jesús (1983). Gutiérrez Mellado, un soldado de España [Gutiérrez Mellado, a Soldier of Spain] (2nd ed.). Argos Vergara. p. 174. ISBN 84-717-85331. OCLC 10145743.
- Tuñón de Lara, Manuel (1980). "Volume No. 12". Historia de España [History of Spain]. Barcelona: Labor. ISBN 9788481830491. OCLC 489566292.
