= Ministry of the Army =

Ministry of the Army may refer to:

- Ministry of the Army (Brazil), Former government ministry in Brazil
- Ministry of the Army (Spain), Former government ministry in Spain
- Army Ministry, cabinet-level ministry in the Empire of Japan (1872–1945)

== See also ==
- Ministry of Defense
