= Félix Álvarez-Arenas =

Spanish general (1913–1992)

Minister of the Army of Spain
- In office 12 December 1975 – 5 July 1977
- Prime Minister: Carlos Arias Navarro; Adolfo Suárez
- Preceded by: Francisco Coloma Gallegos
- Succeeded by: Manuel Gutiérrez Mellado (Defence)

Personal details
- Born: Félix Álvarez-Arenas Pacheco; 1 October 1913 Ceuta, Kingdom of Spain
- Died: 3 October 1992 (aged 79) Madrid, Spain

Military service
- Branch/service: Spanish Armed Forces
- Years of service: 1929–1992

Félix Álvarez-Arenas Pacheco (1 October 1913 – 3 October 1992) was a Spanish general who served as Minister of the Army of Spain between 1975 and 1977.
