= Juan Castañón de Mena =

Spanish general (1903–1982)

Minister of the Army of Spain
- In office 30 October 1969 – 9 June 1973
- Prime Minister: Francisco Franco
- Preceded by: Camilo Menéndez Tolosa
- Succeeded by: Francisco Coloma Gallegos

Personal details
- Born: Juan Castañón de Mena; 10 April 1903 Madrid, Kingdom of Spain
- Died: 27 September 1982 (aged 79) La Coruña, Spain

Military service
- Branch/service: Spanish Armed Forces
- Years of service: 1918–1982

Juan Castañón de Mena (10 April 1903 – 27 September 1982) was a Spanish general who served as Minister of the Army of Spain between 1969 and 1973, during the Francoist dictatorship.
