= Camilo Menéndez Tolosa =

Spanish general

Minister of the Army of Spain
- In office 21 February 1964 – 30 October 1969
- Prime Minister: Francisco Franco
- Preceded by: Pedro Nieto Antúnez (acting)
- Succeeded by: Juan Castañón de Mena

Personal details
- Born: Camilo Menéndez Tolosa; 8 February 1899 Santa Cruz de Tenerife, Kingdom of Spain
- Died: 19 June 1971 (aged 72) Madrid, Spanish State

Military service
- Branch/service: Spanish Armed Forces
- Years of service: 1914–1971

Camilo Menéndez Tolosa (8 February 1899 – 19 June 1971) was a Spanish general who served as Minister of the Army of Spain between 1964 and 1969, during the Francoist dictatorship.
