= Miguel Rodrigo Martínez =

Spanish military officer

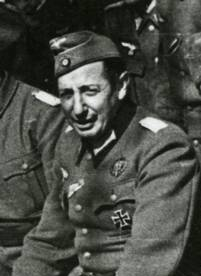
- Rodrigo as an officer of the Blue Division, 1941–43
- Born: Miguel Rodrigo Martínez; 27 December 1895; Santa Clara, Cuba, Kingdom of Spain
- Died: 15 November 1968 (aged 72); Madrid, Spanish State
- Military career
- Allegiance: Kingdom of Spain (1913–1931); Spanish Republic (1931–1936); Nationalist Spain (1936–1968); Nazi Germany
- Branch: Spanish Army; German Army (Wehrmacht)
- Service years: 1913–1968
- Rank: Lieutenant general
- Units: Regulares; Blue Division
- Commands: 1st Division of Navarre; 61st Division; Armoured Division No. 1 "Brunete"; I Military Region
- Conflicts: Rif War; Spanish Civil War; World War II
- Awards: Laureate Cross of Saint Ferdinand; Grand Cross of the Order of Isabella the Catholic; Grand Cross of the Imperial Order of the Yoke and Arrows; Grand Cross (with White Decoration) of Military Merit; Grand Cross (with White Decoration) of Aeronautical Merit; Grand Cross (with White Decoration) of Naval Merit
- Other work: Procurator in the Spanish Cortes (1943–1968)

Miguel Rodrigo Martínez (Note: Also appears as Miguel Rodrigo Martín.) (27 December 1895 in Santa Clara, Cuba – 15 November 1968 in Madrid) was a Spanish military officer. During the Spanish Civil War he fought for the Nationalist faction, commanding several units. He would later participate in World War II as part of the Blue Division, fighting on the Eastern Front for the Axis powers.

== Biography ==
Rodrigo was born in the city of Santa Clara, in the Spanish colony of Cuba on 27 December 1895. He entered the Toledo Infantry Academy in 1913. As Captain of the Regulares of Melilla, during the Rif War he stood out in the defense of the position of Kudia Tahar (Beni Karrich), for which he was awarded the Laureate Cross of Saint Ferdinand.

He was part of the Nationalist faction that rose up against the government of the Second Republic in the Spanish coup of July 1936 that led to the Spanish Civil War and commanded a tabor of the Regulares. He played a prominent role throughout the conflict. In July 1937 he took part in the Battle of Brunete, commanding the second brigade of the 13th Division. He later went on to command the 1st Division of Navarre, with which he would intervene in the Levante Offensive and the Battle of the Ebro, being later replaced in command by the Moroccan colonel Mohamed Meziane. Towards the end of the war he commanded the 61st Division, part of the Urgel Army Corps.

During World War II, he was the most senior colonel in the Blue Division (Spanish: División Azul, German: Blaue Division), or the 250th Infantry Division of the German Wehrmacht, the unit of Spanish volunteers sent to fight alongside the Axis powers against the Soviet Union on the Eastern Front; he was in charge of infantry. He would rise through the ranks to the rank of lieutenant general, which he reached in 1953. He was procurator in the Spanish Cortes between 1943 and 1968. In 1950 he was appointed commander of the Armoured Division No. 1 "Brunete". He later held the position of captain general of the I Military Region. In the context of the university skirmishes between Falangists and non-Falangists in February 1956, he made his position clear in the following way: "As long as I am captain general, not even God will move here." He died in Madrid on 15 November 1968.

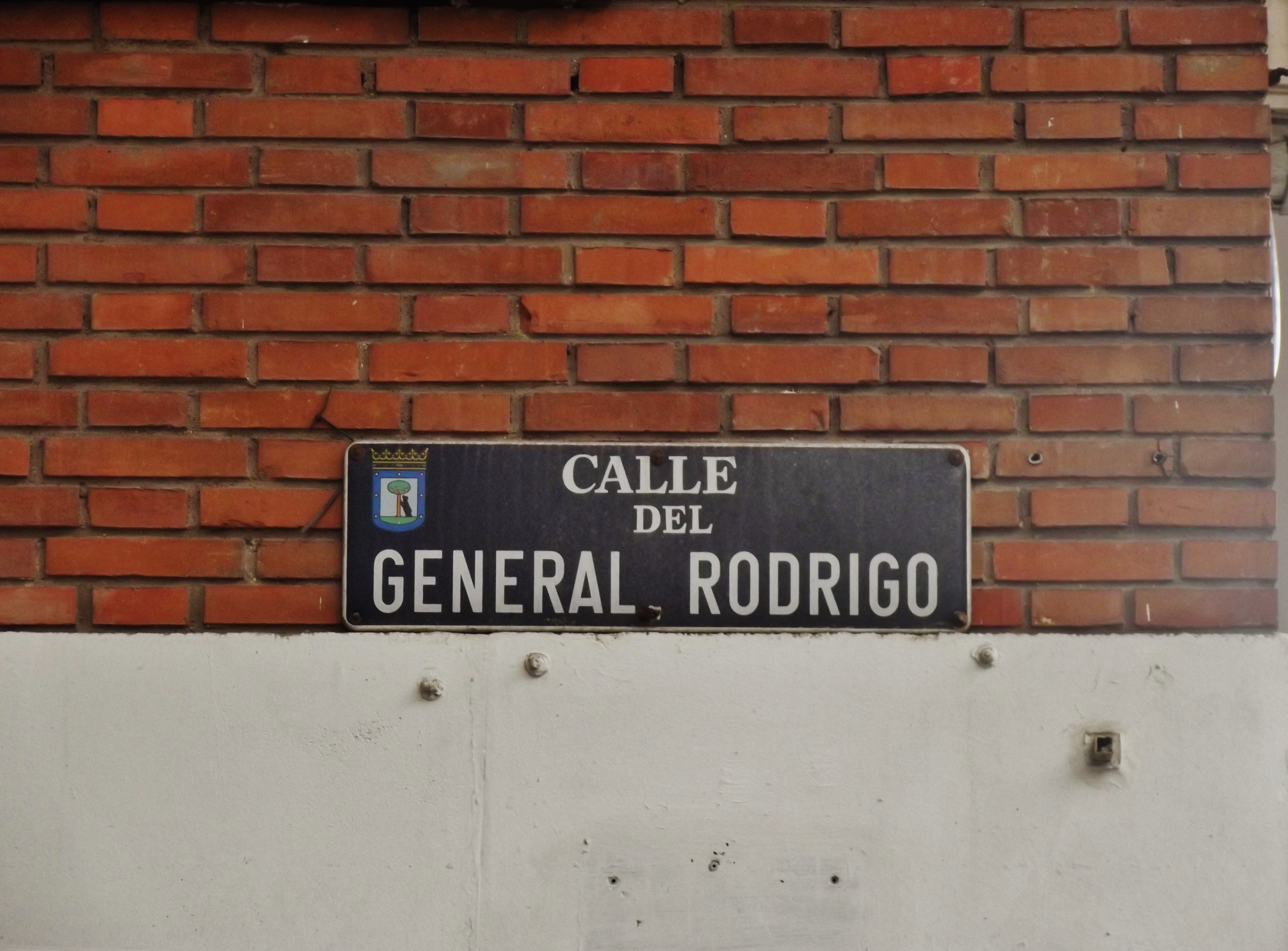
A street sign for Calle del General Rodrigo in January 2017, before its renaming.

Between 1968 and 2017, Calle del General Rodrigo, a street in Madrid running between Calle de Julián Romea and Avenida de la Reina Victoria, was named after him. (Note: On May 4, 2017, the Governing Board of the City Council of Madrid approved, in order to comply with the Historical Memory Law and after the positive vote of the plenary session in April of that year, the change of name of the street to "Calle del Maestro Ángel Llorca".)

== Awards ==
- Laureate Cross of Saint Ferdinand
- Grand Cross of the Order of Isabella the Catholic (1942)
- Grand Cross of the Imperial Order of the Yoke and Arrows (1961)
- Grand Cross (with White Decoration) of Military Merit (1961)
- Grand Cross (with White Decoration) of Aeronautical Merit (1962)
- Grand Cross (with White Decoration) of Naval Merit (1962)
- Adopted son of Vich (1966)

== Bibliography ==
- Alonso Baquer, Miguel (2004). El Ebro, la batalla decisiva de los cien días (in Spanish). La Esfera de los Libros.
- Cardona, Gabriel; Losada, Juan Carlos (2004). Aunque me tires el puente: Memoria oral de la batalla del Ebro (in Spanish). Aguilar. ISBN 9788403095786.
- Engel, Carlos (2010). Historia de las Divisiones del Ejército Nacional 1936–1939 (in Spanish). Madrid: Almena. ISBN 978-84-92714-17-9.
- Gea Ortigas, María Isabel (2012). Los nombres de las calles de Madrid. Madrid: Ediciones La Librería. ISBN 978-84-9873-182-8.
- Gil Pecharromán, Julio (2008). Con permiso de la autoridad: la España de Franco (1939–1975) (in Spanish). Madrid: Temas de Hoy. ISBN 978-8484606932.
- Ibáñez, Rafael (1996). Españoles en las trincheras. La División Azul (in Spanish). En: Stanley G. Payne y Delia Contreras (Eds.) (España y la Segunda Guerra Mundial ed.). Madrid: Editorial Complutense. pp. 55–88. ISBN 84-89365-89X.
- Martínez Bande, José Manuel (1985). El Final de la guerra civil (in Spanish). Madrid: Ed. San Martín.
- Mazarrasa, Javier de (1993). Corazón, cañones, corazas: División Acorazada Brunete no. 1 : cincuenta años de historia (in Spanish). ISBN 9788460615538.
- Preston, Paul (1995) [1990]. The Politics of Revenge: Fascism and the Military in 20th-century Spain. London and New York City: Routledge. ISBN 0-203-40037-2.
- Salas, Ramón (1989). La División Azul (PDF) (Espacio, tiempo y forma. Serie V, Historia contemporánea ed.). Madrid: Universidad Nacional de Educación a Distancia. pp. 241–269. ISSN 1130-0124.
