= Francisco Coloma Gallegos =

Spanish general (1912–1993)

Minister of the Army of Spain
- In office 12 June 1973 – 12 December 1975
- Prime Minister: Francisco Franco; Luis Carrero Blanco; Carlos Arias Navarro
- Preceded by: Juan Castañón de Mena
- Succeeded by: Félix Álvarez-Arenas

Personal details
- Born: Francisco Coloma Gallegos; 26 April 1912 San Esteban de Pravia, Kingdom of Spain
- Died: 28 September 1993 (aged 81) Seville, Spain

Military service
- Branch/service: Spanish Armed Forces
- Years of service: 1930–1993

Francisco de Paula Coloma-Gallegos y Pérez (26 April 1912 – 28 September 1993) was a Spanish general who served as Minister of the Army of Spain between 1973 and 1975, during the Francoist dictatorship.
