= Pablo Martín Alonso =

Spanish general

Minister of the Army of Spain
- In office 11 July 1962 – 11 February 1964
- Prime Minister: Francisco Franco
- Preceded by: Antonio Barroso Sánchez-Guerra
- Succeeded by: Pedro Nieto Antúnez (acting)

Personal details
- Born: Pablo Martín Alonso; 10 July 1896 Ferrol, Galicia, Kingdom of Spain
- Died: 11 February 1964 (aged 67) Madrid, Spanish State

Military service
- Branch/service: Spanish Armed Forces
- Years of service: 1911–1964

Pablo Martín Alonso (10 July 1896 – 11 February 1964) was a Spanish general who served as Minister of the Army of Spain between 1962 and 1964, during the Francoist dictatorship.
