= Antonio Barroso Sánchez-Guerra =

Spanish politician (1893–1982)

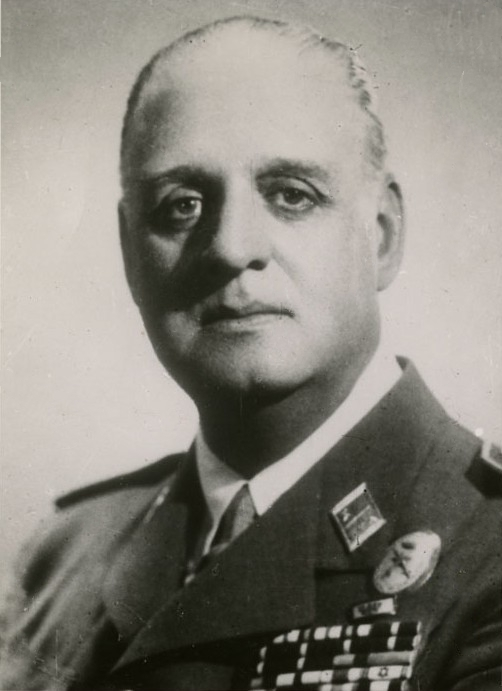

Attorney of the Cortes franquistas
- In office November 16, 1967 – June 30, 1977

Minister of the Army
- In office February 25, 1957 – July 10, 1962
- Preceded by: Agustín Muñoz Grandes
- Succeeded by: Pablo Martín Alonso

Personal details
- Born: Antonio Barroso y Sánchez Guerra; July 31, 1893 Marín, Spain
- Died: August 11, 1982 (aged 89) Madrid, Spain
- Education: Toledo Infantry Academy (1913)
- Occupation: Politician, soldier

Military service
- Branch/service: Spanish Army
- Rank: Lieutenant general
- Battles/wars: Spanish Civil War, Ifni War

Antonio Barroso Sánchez-Guerra (1893 – 1982), a general, was a senior member of the Francoist regime in Spain. He was Minister of the Army between 25 February 1957 and 10 July 1962.

Barroso was also the main protector of the French fascist Louis Darquier, who was given asylum in Spain after World War II.

== Bibliography ==
- Fernández de Córdoba, Fernando (1939): Memorias de un soldado locutor. Madrid, Ediciones Españolas S.A.
- Lojendio, Luís María de (1940): Operaciones militares de la guerra de España: 1936-1939. Prologue by Antonio Barroso. Barcelona, Ed. Montaner y Simon
- Pérez Fernández, Herminio: Guía política de España. Instituciones, ABC. 14 November 1976
