= Ministry of the Army (Spain) =

Former government department of Spain (1939–1977)

- Spanish: Ministerio del Ejército
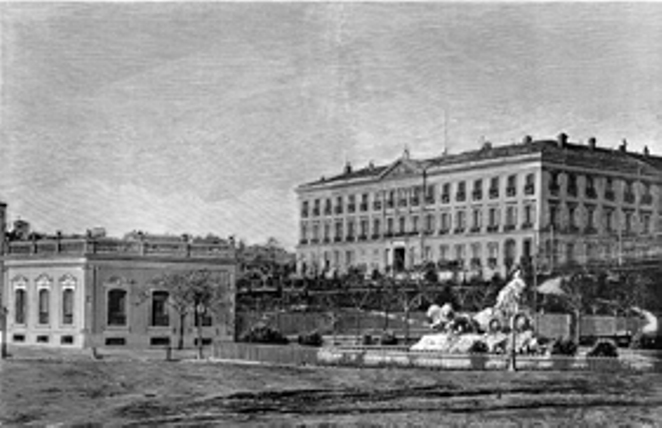
- Palace of Buenavista, formerly the site of the army ministry

Agency overview
- Formed: 9 August 1939; 87 years ago
- Preceding agency: Ministry of War
- Dissolved: 4 July 1977; 49 years ago
- Superseding agency: Ministry of Defence
- Jurisdiction: Spanish Army
- Headquarters: Palace of Buenavista
- Ministers responsible: LTG José Enrique Varela, first Minister; LTG Félix Álvarez-Arenas, last Minister

The Ministry of the Army (Spanish: Ministerio del Ejército) was a government department of Spain that was tasked with oversight of the Spanish Army (Ejército de Tierra) during the Francoist regime.

The ministry was created on 8 August 1939 after the end of the Spanish Civil War, succeeding the Ministry of War. It was dissolved on 4 July 1977 by the Royal Decree 1558/1977, being merged with the Ministry of Defence as part of the transition to democracy.

== History ==
The Ministry of the Army originated in the Ministry of War, which existed from the 19th century to the Second Spanish Republic, coinciding with the beginning of the Spanish Civil War and the reorganization of the governmental structure. When the first government of Francisco Franco was formed in 1938, the Ministry of National Defense was established under the then commander of the Army of the North, Fidel Dávila Arrondo. The three branches of the Armed Forces (Army, Navy and Air Force) were grouped under its control. It was disestablished on 8 August 1939, after the end of the Civil War, when the ministries of Army, Navy and Air were created in the second government of Francisco Franco. On 22 September the organic structure of the new ministerial department was organized.

Over the years, the Ministry became a bureaucratic giant, practically closed to society and the country that were progressively evolving. The Ministry became a slow organism, without even a standardized and unified administrative criterion due to the internal contradictions of its different departments and the multiple competencies that each of them had. The administrative inefficiency reached the point that sometimes the departments of the Ministry encountered problems in coordinating the Military Regions of Spain with each other. Thus, the Ministry became the exponent of a bureaucratic office where it was possible to obtain a position or administrative charges depending on the services provided to the regime, or to the rampant nepotism that prevailed within the Army.

The Ministry was abolished by the Royal Decree 1558/1977 of 4 July 1977, when Prime Minister Adolfo Suárez created the Ministry of Defence as part of his second government (formed following the 1977 general election), which integrated the ministries of the Army, Navy and Air Force during the transition to democracy.

== Organic structure ==
On 22 September 1939 the structure of the Ministry was organized, being composed of the following departments:

- General Staff of the Army
- General Secretariat
- General Directorates: Military Education, Recruitment and Personnel, Industry and Material, Transportation
- General Inspection of Fortifications
- Directorate-General of the Civil Guard and Carabineros
- Superior Council of the Army
- Supreme Council of Military Justice

The new Supreme Council of Military Justice regained functions and powers of the former Supreme Council of War and Navy, disappeared during the Second Republic following the military reform of Manuel Azaña (Azaña Law). The powers of this tribunal were not limited only to the Army, but also the Navy and the Air Force. In addition, it implied the full restoration of the Code of Military Justice of 1890.

In the case of the Civil Guard, it was subject to the Ministry of the Army "in everything related to its organization, discipline, armament and personnel", but also depended in other areas of the Ministry of the Interior and Ministry of Finance. The Carabineros were integrated into the Civil Guard in 1940 and disappeared, while the new Armed Police Corps, created in 1941, was also subject to the Army in some areas.

== List of ministers ==
No.	Portrait	Name (Birth–Death)	Term of office			Political party	Government	Ref.
No.	Portrait	Name (Birth–Death)	Took office	Left office	Time in office	Political party	Government	Ref.
1		Lieutenant General; José Enrique Varela (1891–1951) (Note: Dismissed in the aftermath of the Begoña Bombing.)	9 August 1939	3 September 1942	3 years, 25 days	Military	Franco II	
2		Lieutenant General; Carlos Asensio Cabanillas (1896–1970)	3 September 1942	20 July 1945	2 years, 320 days	Military	Franco II	
3		Lieutenant General; Fidel Dávila Arrondo (1878–1962)	20 July 1945	19 July 1951	5 years, 364 days	Military	Franco III	
4		Lieutenant General; Agustín Muñoz Grandes (1896–1970)	19 July 1951	25 February 1957	5 years, 221 days	Military	Franco IV	
5		Lieutenant General; Antonio Barroso Sánchez-Guerra (1893–1982)	25 February 1957	11 July 1962	5 years, 136 days	Military	Franco V	
6		Lieutenant General; Pablo Martín Alonso (1896–1964)	11 July 1962	11 February 1964 #	1 year, 215 days	Military	Franco VI	
–		Admiral; Pedro Nieto Antúnez (1898–1978); Acting; Minister of the Navy	11 February 1964	25 February 1964	14 days	Military	Franco VI	
7		General; Camilo Menéndez Tolosa (1899–1971)	25 February 1964	30 October 1969	5 years, 247 days	Military	Franco VI–VII	
8		Lieutenant General; Juan Castañón de Mena (1903–1982)	30 October 1969	9 June 1973	3 years, 222 days	Military	Franco VIII	
9		General; Francisco Coloma Gallegos (1912–1993)	12 June 1973	12 December 1975	2 years, 183 days	Military	Carrero Blanco; Arias Navarro I	
10		Lieutenant General; Félix Álvarez-Arenas (1913–1992)	12 December 1975	5 July 1977	1 year, 205 days	Military	Arias Navarro II; Suárez I	

== See also ==
- Chief of Staff of the Army (Spain)
