= Esperanza Casteleiro =

Spanish intelligence agent (born 1956)

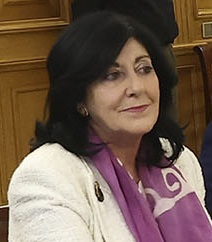

Director of the National Intelligence Center
- Incumbent
- Assumed office 11 May 2022
- President: Pedro Sánchez
- Preceded by: Paz Esteban López

Secretary of State for Defense
- In office 1 July 2020 – 11 May 2022
- Preceded by: Ángel Olivares
- Succeeded by: Amparo Valcarce

Secretary-general of the National Intelligence Center
- In office 28 September 2004 – 21 June 2008
- Preceded by: María Dolores Vilanova Alonso
- Succeeded by: Elena Sánchez Blanco

Personal details
- Born: 18 December 1956 (age 68); Madrid, Spain
- Education: Complutense University of Madrid
- Profession: Intelligence officer

Esperanza Casteleiro Llamazares (born 18 December 1956) is a Spanish intelligence officer who has served as director of the National Intelligence Center since May 2022. She was previously Secretary of State for Defense from 2020 to 2022.

Casteleiro has spent almost all of her career in the Spanish intelligence services, first in the Centro Superior de Información de la Defensa (CESID) and then in the National Intelligence Center (CNI). She also held important positions in the Ministry of Defense between 2018 and 2022, first as director of the cabinet of minister of defense Margarita Robles, and then as secretary of state for defense.

== Life ==
Casteleiro was born in Madrid on 18 December 1956. Her father, Antonio Casteleiro Naveiras, was a soldier from Mugardos, A Coruña, who served in the Spanish Air Force during the Franco era. She studied Philosophy and Educational Sciences at the Complutense University of Madrid, and she has taken various training courses in the fields of intelligence and human resources. She is considered an expert on counterterrorism and on the Maghreb region.

=== Career ===
In 1983, Casteleiro joined the Centro Superior de Información de la Defensa (CESID), which became the National Intelligence Center (CNI) in 2002. She has held various key positions in these agencies, including leading the counterintelligence division and the human resources management department at CNI. She has been deployed in foreign countries like Cuba and Portugal.

In 2004 the government of José Luis Rodríguez Zapatero, with José Bono as minister of defense, appointed her as secretary-general of the CNI, making her CNI director Alberto Saiz's number two. She held the position for almost four years, and was succeeded in 2008 by Elena Sánchez Blanco, another agency veteran.

After leaving the position of secretary-general, Casteleiro held other foreign intelligence positions. In 2014 she was appointed as head of the CNI intelligence unit in the Intelligence Center for Counter-Terrorism and Organized Crime (CITCO), a position she held until June 2018, when she was appointed head of the cabinet of minister of defense Margarita Robles.

In early 2020 she was reported to be a possible candidate to replace Félix Sanz Roldán as head of the CNI, but instead, the government appointed the agency's secretary-general at the time, Paz Esteban López. Then in mid-2020, she was rumored to be a possible replacement for departing secretary of state for defense Ángel Olivares. She was appointed as secretary of state for defence on 1 July 2020.

In a meeting on 10 May 2022, the Council of Ministers appointed her director of the CNI, replacing Paz Esteban López following the Pegasus spyware scandal, CatalanGate.

== Awards ==
- Silver crosses of the Civil Guard Order of Merit and the Cross of Aeronautical Merit.

Preceded by María Dolores Vilanova Alonso	Secretary-general of the National Intelligence Center; 2004–2008	Succeeded by Elena Sánchez Blanco
Preceded by Ángel Olivares	Secretary of State for Defense; 2020–2022	Succeeded by Amparo Valcarce
Preceded by Paz Esteban López	Director of the National Intelligence Center; 2022–	Succeeded by current
