= Director of the National Intelligence Centre (Spain) =

- Seal of the National Intelligence Centre

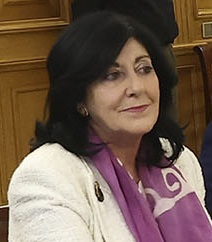
- Incumbent; Esperanza Casteleiro since May 11, 2022
- National Intelligence Centre
- Member of: National Security Council
- Reports to: Prime Minister; Minister of Defence
- Seat: Padre Huidobro Avenue, S/N, Madrid
- Appointer: Monarch with the Minister of Defence countersignature
- Term length: 5 years, no terms limit
- Constituting instrument: National Intelligence Centre Act of 2002
- Precursor: Director of the Superior Defense Information Centre
- Formation: May 6, 2002
- First holder: Jorge Dezcallar de Mazarredo
- Deputy: Secretary-General of the National Intelligence Centre
- Website: www.cni.es

The Director of the National Intelligence Centre, officially Secretary of State-Director of the National Intelligence Centre (SED) is the head of the National Intelligence Centre (CNI), the main intelligence agency of Spain. The SED is appointed by the Monarch at the proposal of the Minister of Defense after deliberation by the Council of Ministers. The director is the main advisor to the prime minister and to the defence minister in matters of intelligence and counterintelligence.

As head of the Spanish intelligence services, the SED is responsible for promoting the agency's actions and coordinating its units to achieve the intelligence objectives set by the central government, ensuring the adequacy of the Centre's activities to these objectives and displaying the representation of that.

The SED also prepares the CNI budget; appoints and separates staff; establishes the necessary relationships with public and private entities, with the law enforcement agencies and with the civil and military administrations for the proper development of the activities of the Centre and the SED also heads the National Cryptologic Center. Furthermore, the director is the only official competent of the CNI to authorize its personnel to use firearms.

The Secretary of State-Director is legally considered as the National Intelligence and Counterintelligence Authority. The SED is also member of the National Security Council and the National Defense Council.

== History ==
The history of Spain has made it difficult for decades for the intelligence services to articulate themselves as a truly useful organ for governments. The first services date back to 1935 during the Second Republic, but the Civil War prevented its development and even during the dictatorship of Francisco Franco, although these services existed, they were too many, without coordination and each one trying to assume a more leading role than the other.

It was not until 1977, after the first democratic elections, that the prime minister Adolfo Suárez decided to unify the Central Documentation Service (SECED), the Information Service of the Presidency of the Government (SIPG) and the Third Information Section (military intelligence) of the Defence High Command giving rise to the Superior Defense Information Center (CESID). To head this agency it was created the position of Director of the Superior Defense Information Center, a position held by both civilian and military personnel.

In 2002 the current position appears with the creation of the National Intelligence Centre, and it is occupied by the previous director of CESID, Jorge Dezcallar de Mazarredo who stayed in office until 2004, being replaced by another civilian, Alberto Saiz Cortés, until 2009 when Army General Félix Sanz Roldán was appointed. Roldán hold the office for two terms, until in 2019 when he ceased as director after the end of his term and assumed his duties on an interim basis Paz Esteban López, the agency's Secretary-General. Esteban was confirmed as director in February 2020.

== Accountability ==
=== Parliamentary control ===
The Director of the CNI, as head of the agency, is accountable before the Congress of Deputies's committee that supervises the State Secrets. This special committee is chaired by the President of the Congress of Deputies and its deliberations are not public.

This committee has access to classified information, with the exception of those related to the sources and means of the National Intelligence Centre and to those that come from foreign intelligence services or international organizations in the terms established in the corresponding agreements and exchange agreements of the classified information. All the documents can be analyzed by the members of that commission but, once examined, they will be returned to the National Intelligence Centre for proper custody, without originals, copies or reproductions being retained.

Before this committee, the Secretary of State-Director must also present an annual report on the evaluation of activities, situation and degree of compliance with the intelligence objectives established by the Government of the Nation.

=== Judicial control ===
The CNI's actions are legally regulated by an Organic Act and judicially controlled by a special magistrate of the Supreme Court.

When the SED has to authorize operations that affect the inviolability of the home and the secrecy of communications, it must request authorization from the competent magistrate of the Supreme Court who will respond within 72 hours. If the SED duly justifies reasons for urgency, the period can be reduced to 24 hours. The law also establishes that all the non-relevant information obtained through this judicial authorization must be immediately destroyed.

== Deputy ==
In the cases of the director's absence, vacancy or illness, the Secretary-General of the National Intelligence Centre will replace him.

The main functions of the Secretary-General are to support and assist the Director of the National Intelligence Centre in the exercise of his or her functions, to establish mechanisms and organization systems of the agency and to determine the necessary actions for its updating and improvement, to direct the operation of the common services of the agency through the corresponding instructions and service orders, to perform the senior leadership of the agency's personnel, to prepare the relationship proposal of jobs and to determine the vacant positions to fill during each year.

== List of secretaries of state-directors ==
To see the predecessors, see Centro Superior de Información de la Defensa#Directors. Since its creation in 2002, the agency has had three directors; two civilians and one military.

Spanish Socialist Workers' Party
People's Party (Spain)
Denotes an Acting Director of the National Intelligence Centre

No.	Image	Name	Start	End	Time in office	Prime Minister(s) served under
1º		Jorge Dezcallar de Mazarredo (1945–)	May 11, 2002	April 20, 2004	1 year, 345 days	José María Aznar
2º		Alberto Saiz Cortés (1953–)	April 20, 2004	July 6, 2009	5 years, 77 days	José Luis Rodríguez Zapatero
3º		Félix Sanz Roldán (1945–)	July 6, 2009	July 6, 2019	10 years, 0 days	José Luis Rodríguez Zapatero
3º		Félix Sanz Roldán (1945–)	July 6, 2009	July 6, 2019	10 years, 0 days	Mariano Rajoy
3º		Félix Sanz Roldán (1945–)	July 6, 2009	July 6, 2019	10 years, 0 days	Pedro Sánchez
4º		Paz Esteban López (1958–)	July 6, 2019	February 5, 2020	214 days	Pedro Sánchez
4º		Paz Esteban López (1958–)	February 5, 2020	May 11, 2022	2 years, 95 days	Pedro Sánchez
5º		Esperanza Casteleiro (1956–)	May 11, 2022	Incumbent	4 years, 119 days	Pedro Sánchez
