= Assault on the Central Bank of Barcelona =

1981 Spanish hostage incident

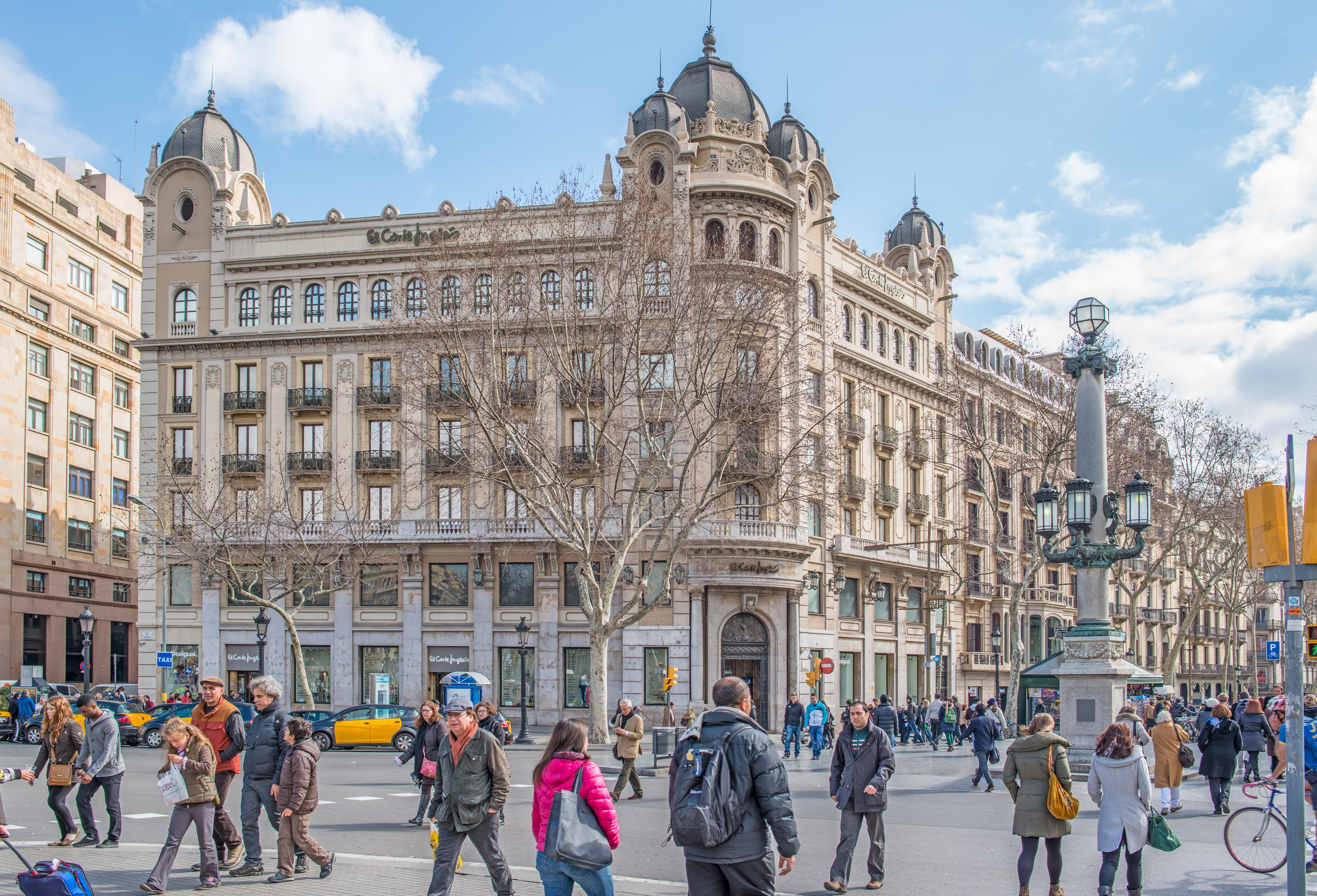
- Date: 23 May 1981
- Location: Barcelona, Spain
- Type: Kidnapping, Hostage-taking
- Deaths: 1
- Injuries: 1

The assault on the Central Bank of Barcelona was an assault that took place at the headquarters of the Central Bank of Barcelona, Spain, on 23 May 1981. The motives behind the assault have not yet been fully clarified, with hypotheses ranging from an attempted robbery to the acquisition of compromising documents related to the events of 23F. The assault led to the kidnapping of around three hundred people, including employees and passersby who were inside the building at the time. The hostage-taking lasted for 37 hours.

== Historical context ==
After the 23 February 1981 coup attempt, which happened three months prior to the assault, Spain was still recovering from the shock of an attempt to overthrow the democratic system that was emerging after Francisco Franco's death. The President of the Spanish government was Leopoldo Calvo-Sotelo at the time, who was elected two days after the parliamentary session where the coup attempt happened, with Felipe González serving as the Leader of the Opposition.

== Day of the assault ==
The assault started on Saturday, May 23, a few minutes after 9:00 a.m., on a day when the bank was open. The headquarters, located at number 23 of Plaça de Catalunya in Barcelona, occupied an entire seven-story building and had entrances from La Rambla.

At least eleven people entered the building under the command of José Juan Martínez Gómez, also known as 'el Rubio', holding employees, customers and passersby hostage. At 09:23, the police received an anonymous tip-off that the bank was being robbed. At around 14:30, the main editorial offices of Barcelona's newspapers were informed that a statement was left in a phone booth in Plaça de Catalunya, and Diario de Barcelona journalists retrieved it. In the statement, typed in Spanish, the hostages demanded that 'four heroes of February 23 and our brave Lieutenant Coronel Tejero' be released and two airplanes be arranged, one at the Barajas Airport and another at the El Prat Airport, so as to facilitate the departure of the four military officers along with the commando unit who was in the bank. A 72-hour deadline was set, with a threat to execute ten hostages immediately and five every hour thereafter. The Government of Spain, who were already alerted by the statement, considered the hypothesis of some Civil Guard members being involved, and established a crisis team at the headquarters of Banco de Bilbao, near the assaulted building. The Government's first official statement suggested that the assault was being executed by far-right extremists. Both Tejero and José Ignacio San Martín declared through their lawyers that they opposed any attempts to be released.

The authorities evacuated Plaça de Catalunya and the upper part of La Rambla, as well as the nearest buildings. A few hours later, an ambulance rescued two hostages, one of whom had been injured by a firearm. After a few minutes, some hostages were exchanged for food. During the initial hours, the crisis team considered the hypothesis that Gil Sánchez Valiente, who had supposedly been involved in the recent coup d'état and had disappeared afterwards, was part of the commando unit.

During the entire day, starting at midday, the attackers tried to escape through a tunnel in the building's basement, which proved impossible since the tools they brought could not penetrate a stone wall. Seeing that their initial plan had failed, they made a pile of banknotes. Negotiations were ongoing in the meantime. A hostage was evacuated at around 06:00, after the night had passed. At 10:00, a tankette with a megaphone was used to communicate with the assailants. At that moment, a crossfire broke out between the attackers and the tankette. More hostage exchanges took place throughout the morning, and the assailants' leader 'el Rubio' stepped outside and walked around the bank's surroundings, protected by a hostage. At midday, Barcelona's civil governor and the Director-General of the Police met.

On Sunday in the afternoon, the attackers began negotiating their surrender. However, at 19:55, a sniper took down one of the assailants who was holding a hostage on the building's rooftop. He was the brother-in-law and the brother of two attackers, and his death provoked panic and tension. This led to the intervention of the Grupo Especial de Operaciones (the Police's Special Group of Operations), who entered through the rooftop and began progressing downwards floor by floor. At that moment, more than two hundred hostages were still being held in the building. El Rubio decided to release the hostages, allowing the assailants to mix in with them when leaving. After leaving through the Las Ramblas's exit, the police ordered everybody to lie on the ground. In a few minutes, nine of the attackers were arrested.

== Consequences ==
The outcome of the assault was relatively satisfactory, since there was only one fatality, one person injured, and only one of the assailants managed to escape. After their arrest, it was confirmed that the attackers had no ties to politics or the Civil Guard. In a press conference, General Aramburu, speaking on behalf of the crisis team, described the assailants as a "gang of thieves, thugs, and anarchists." Meanwhile, the Government, represented by Calvo-Sotelo, gave vague and unclear responses to parliamentary groups. The assailants were sentenced to 30 to 40 years in prison.

== Motives ==
After the assault was resolved, the Government officially concluded that the perpetrators were ordinary criminals, though this was not the case according to a 2009 interview, where José Juan Martínez Gómez (El Rubio) claimed that he had been contacted by two individuals: Luis, the head of covert operations at the Centro Superior de Información de la Defensa, and the agency's deputy director of security Emilio Alonso Manglano. He stated that he was hired by them to steal some documents inside the bank, which allegedly seriously threatened the country's security and stability. The documents outlined which military captaincies would take action, indicated that Alfonso Armada was meant to lead the national unity government after the 23F coup, and suggested that the King was in agreement. Once the assault had begun, El Rubio seized the documents, analysed their content and placed them in a leather case for extraction. Allegedly, they might have been smuggled out during the first hostage release. However, Enrique Esteban, captain and deputy commander of the GEO unit, stated that 'if the hostages had taken anything out with them, it would have been found.'

== In popular culture ==
- Bank Under Siege, 1983 movie.
- Bank Under Siege, 2024 Netflix miniseries.

== Bibliography ==
- Padilla, Mar (2023). Asalto al Banco Central. Libros del K.O. ISBN 978-84-19119-20-9.
