= José Juan Martínez Gómez =

Spanish criminal leader

- Born: 1957 (age 68–69); Almeria, Spain
- Citizenship: Spanish
- Occupations: Bandit, Hostage taker
- Known for: Assault on the Central Bank of Barcelona
- Children: 2 (Alleged)

José Juan Martínez Gómez, known as El Rubio, was the criminal leader of the Assault on the Central Bank of Barcelona on the 23rd of May 1981. He spent his early life between youth reformatories and small robberies. He was 25 years old when he committed the Banco Central Assault. In an interview with DEIA Newspaper, Martínez Gómez said:"A prison is the university, and the reformatory is the antechamber of crime." His nickname was 'El Rubio' as he smoked 'tabaco rubio' (lighter flavour) as opposed to "Tabaco negro" (full flavour black tobacco).

== Assault to the Banco Central of Barcelona ==
Martínez Gómez led a team of eleven men who entered Banco Central and took 300 people as hostages. It has been speculated due to his declarations post arrest that one of the motives for the assault to the bank was to retrieve some documents from the vaults on behalf of the secret service.

The group took around 300 people hostage, including employees and customers, for 37 hours. Initially, the assailants demanded the release of military officers involved in the failed 1981 Spanish coup attempt (23-F), which led to speculation about possible political motivations of the extreme right behind the assault. Authorities, after resolving the crisis, concluded that it was an attempted robbery with no political links. However, in later interviews, Martínez Gómez claimed he had been hired by members of the Centro Superior de Información de la Defensa (CESID) to retrieve compromising documents related to the 23-F coup attempt, which were allegedly kept in the bank. These claims have not been corroborated by documentary evidence.

Martínez Gómez was sentenced to 30 years in prison for his involvement in the robbery. During his time in prison, ‘El Rubio’ was involved in several escape attempts. In 1988, one of these led to a confrontation in which he was seriously injured and two police officers lost their lives. In 1996, he took advantage of a temporary release to escape again, although he was recaptured shortly afterward.

== Later years and present day ==
After serving his sentence, he was released in 2016 and moved to Irún, where he remained under police surveillance. Martínez Gómez currently resides in Hondarribia. Despite his past, the mastermind behind the assault took part in the filming of the Netflix series Bank Under Siege and also collaborated with writer Mar Padilla on her book, as she interviewed him for the work published in 2023.

== In popular culture ==
- Bank Under Siege, 1983 movie.
- Bank Under Siege, 2024 Netflix miniseries.

== Bibliography ==
- Padilla, Mar (2023). Asalto al Banco Central. Libros del K.O. ISBN 978-84-19119-20-9.
