= Paz Esteban López =

Spanish official and Director of the National Intelligence Center

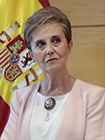

Director of the National Intelligence Centre
- In office February 5, 2020 – May 11, 2022; Acting: July 6, 2019 – February 5, 2020
- Monarch: Felipe VI
- President: Pedro Sánchez
- Preceded by: Félix Sanz Roldán
- Succeeded by: Esperanza Casteleiro

Secretary-General of the National Intelligence Center
- In office June 13, 2017 – February 5, 2020
- Director: Félix Sanz Roldán
- Preceded by: Beatriz Méndez de Vigo
- Succeeded by: Arturo Relanzón Sánchez-Gabriel

Personal details
- Born: 1958; Madrid, Spain
- Education: Autonomous University of Madrid

Paz Esteban López (born 1958) is a Spanish intelligence officer. She served as Director of the National Intelligence Centre (CNI) from 2020 to 2022. She was the first woman to hold the post and was previously the Secretary-General of the agency from 2017 to 2019, under Félix Sanz Roldán. In 2022, she was removed from her position as CNI director following revelations, which came to be known as CatalanGate, where various national and regional politicians had been targeted by phone tapping through Pegasus spyware.

== Early life ==
Esteban was born in Madrid in 1958. She studied at the Autonomous University of Madrid, where she graduated in May 1978 with a degree of Philosophy and Literature. She is an expert in ancient and medieval history. After graduating, Esteban began to prepare the public exam for archives and libraries civil servants. However, a relative of his father offered her to work in a "Ministry", which ended up being the Spanish intelligence service.

== Early career ==
She joined the Superior Centre for Defense Information (CESID) in 1983 when General Emilio Alonso Manglano was director. Esteban specialized in foreign intelligence, although she has never worked as a field agent. Her first jobs within the intelligence service were the preparation of reports on the permanence of Spain in NATO, before the 1986 referendum. She also elaborated, as an analyst, reports relating the 11-S and 11-M terrorist attacks.

Until 2004 she held positions focused on foreign intelligence and, as of this year, she was promoted to managing posts. In 2010, CNI Director Sanz Roldán appointed her as his chief of staff, a position she held until June 2017, when she was appointed Secretary-General of the intelligence agency (second-in-command) after the resignation of Beatriz Méndez de Vigo.

=== Secretary-General of the CNI ===
In June 2017, CNI secretary-general Beatriz Méndez de Vigo announced her resignation and, despite the efforts of the Deputy Prime Minister, Sáenz de Santamaría, to convince her otherwise, her resignation was effective on June 13, 2017.

On June 9, 2017, the Council of Ministers nominated Esteban as secretary-general. The Monarch effectively appointed her on June 13, 2017.

In July 2019, the second five-years-term of the director of the CNI, Sanz Roldán, ended. At that time, the Spanish government (Sánchez I Government) was a caretaker government due to the April 2019 general election. The impossibility of forming a government provoked that the Prime Minister could not renew the director for a new term or to nominate a new candidate.

Due to this situation, Esteban, who was the Secretary-General of the CNI and, therefore, the agency's second authority, assumed the direction ad interim of the intelligence service, being the first woman to hold the post.

== Director of the CNI ==
On January 31, 2020, the Office of the Prime Minister announced that, Esteban, who since July 2019 was acting director of the agency, would be confirmed as the new CNI Director and as the CCN Director. Esteban was officially appointed on February 5, 2020. She was sworn in on February 10, 2020.

On February 19 the central government appointed Arturo Relanzón Sánchez-Gabriel as the new secretary-general of the agency, being the first man to hold the position.

On May 10, 2022, Esteban was dismissed as director of the CNI by the Spanish government following revelations that several national and regional politicians had been the target of phone tapping using the controversial Pegasus spyware. Esteban said that the CNI had phones tapped by a court order. She then received 174,122 euros in compensation.
