= José Manuel Villarejo =

Spanish businessman and police officer (born 1951)

- Born: José Manuel Villarejo Pérez; 3 August 1951 (age 74); El Carpio, Spain
- Occupations: Businessman; Police officer
- Years active: 1970s - present
- Known for: Police office commissioner
- Notable work: Operation Catalonia
- Spouse: Gemma Alcala

José Manuel Villarejo Pérez (born 3 August 1951) is a Spanish businessman and a former officer in Spain's National Police Corps. He was arrested in 2017. He is accused of involvement in a network of corrupt politicians, businesspeople, police officers and media figures known as the “sewers of state”. His trial started in October 2021. He was sentenced to 19 years in jail in 2024.

== Biography ==
Villarejo was born in 1951 in the Andalusian town of El Carpio, the son of a pharmacist and a midwife. He began his career in Francisco Franco’s military when conscription had been mandatory.

After time in the army, he joined the Social Investigation Brigade of the Spanish National Police Corps in 1972, assigned to the provincial police station of San Sebastián until 1975, where he was part of the anti-terrorist group and took part in various actions against ETA. He was later assigned to the Citizen Security team of the Prefecture of Madrid, where he remained until 1983. On leave from 1983 to 1993, during these years he devoted himself to business. Villarejo managed up to 46 different companies with a share capital of more than 16 million euros. In 1993 he was reinstated as an operating agent, or undercover agent, in the Secretary of State for the Interior. During his periods of leave and after retiring from the Spanish police, Villarejo carried out several investigative works for companies—mainly a detective agency and a law firm. These jobs include research commissioned by public bodies, private entities and individuals.

In the mid-1990s, he participated in the preparation of the Véritas report, commissioned by the Spanish Ministry of the Interior led by José Luis Corcuera (PSOE) and coordinated by Enrique de Federico, Commissioner of Judicial Police, in which he collected data on the private lives of judges such as Baltasar Garzón, politicians, journalists and businessmen such as Javier de la Rosa.

Since 2014, Villarejo has been involved in several criminal cases against Félix Sánz Roldán for disclosure of secrets, membership in a criminal organization and money laundering. Villarejo is also charged in a Madrid court with crimes of disclosure of secrets and membership in a criminal organization in the process of searching for a separate piece of the Pequeño Nicolás, for alleged illegal recording, manipulation and dissemination of a conversation between police officers and members of the Spanish intellicence organization, the National Intelligence Center. In February 2017, to avoid prosecution, Villarejo leaked information to the press about the Spanish King Juan Carlos and the National Intelligence Center. He also threatened to leak more information if he was not removed from the process.

In early 2019, José Manuel Villarejo sent a letter to Pedro Sánchez, Spain's Prime Minister, accusing Sanz Roldan of threatening certain judges of the National Court with data of their privacy so that they stop investigating issues that affect the CNI. He also accused him of working against the interests of Spain by supporting Venezuelan interests or allowing the leaks about the Spanish royal family.

He was also accused of recording conversations with businesspeople in secret, which he would later use to blackmail them.

Other accusations against Roldan made by Villarejo has been to protect emeritus king Juan Carlos I by threatening and bribing Corinna zu Sayn-Wittgenstein-Sayn, a former lover of the monarch, who supposedly hides critical information for the former king of Spain. All these accusations have been denied by Sanz Roldán and the CNI. According to a document reviewed by the BBC, Villarejo also asserts that agents from the CNI "instructed me to gain Princess Corinna's trust in order to recover especially sensitive documents she held".

Regarding the Catalonia independence movement, Villarejo testified before a notary that he was the author of several reports of Operation Catalonia, a maneuver by the Spanish Ministry of the Interior to curb independence in Catalonia. The recording of the wiretaps was leaked by Police Commissioner Marcelino Martín-Blas.

In Jan 2022, Villarejo claimed at the Spanish High Court that the National Intelligence Service (CNI) was involved in the terrorist attacks in Barcelona and Cambrils in August 2017. "I continued to work with the CNI until the last day. I worked with them to try to fix the mess of the famous attack by the Imam of Ripoll, which in the end was a serious mistake by Sanz Roldán, who miscalculated the consequences of making a small scare action in Catalonia", he stated.

In 2024, Villarejo was sentenced to 19 years in prison.
