= Operation Catalonia =

Spanish undercover police operation

Operation Catalonia/Operación Cataluña/Operació Catalunya
- Operation name: Operation Catalonia/Operación Cataluña/Operació Catalunya

Participants
- Executed by: Spain

Mission
- Target: Catalan pro-independence politicians

Timeline
- Date begin: 2012
- Date end: 2016

Operation Catalonia (Operació Catalunya in Catalan) is the name of a covert police operation allegedly driven by the government of Spain which aimed to curb the Catalan independence process. The operation consisted of research and information gathering about Catalan independence politicians without judicial authorization. The operation allegedly included the creation or use of false evidence, data manipulation, irregular reports, secret agents, leaks to the press and the use of threats to obtain confidential information.

The operation allegedly started after the 2012 Catalan independence demonstration. The heads of the National Police started an extrajudicial operation that was kept secret even within the corps.

The operation consisted of investigating and compiling information from politicians that were favorable to the independence of Catalonia without any judicial authorization. To do this, two methods were allegedly used: a special and secret unit of the National Police Corps, depending on the Ministry of the Interior (Spain), and also through the Spanish embassy in Andorra, dependent on the Spanish Ministry of Foreign Affairs and Cooperation.

== History of the case ==
On July 6, 2016, the Ex-Commissary of the National Police Corps, José Manuel Villarejo, revealed in court that he worked with former head of the internal affairs unit, Marcelino Martín Blas, to stop the pro-independence movement. Villarejo admitted that he was in charge of "investigating crimes", while Martín Blas was devoted to "appointments", "stories" and "finding sources". He also said that among the sources that Martín Blas had used there was the former head of the Anti-Fraud Office of Catalonia, Daniel de Alfonso, who also appeared in the recordings released earlier of the two meetings held in October 2014 with the Spanish interior minister, Jorge Fernández Díaz, in which both allegedly conspired to seek evidence against pro-independence politicians.

On July 11, 2016, a police report was made public, signed by Marcelino Martín Blas, that confirmed the existence of the Operation Catalunya, and which states that one of the duties of Commissary José Villarejo "during the last legislature was investigating "the Catalan independence process."

On August 18, 2016, former president of Banca Privada d'Andorra, Higini Cierco, reported that he had received pressure from members of the Ministry of the Interior (Spain) and the heads of the national police to obtain banking information of some pro-independence politicians and their families. In particular, he assured that he had received threats and been blackmailed by Celestino Barroso, attaché from the Ministry of the Interior to the embassy of Spain in Andorra, and by Marcelino Martín Blas, Chief of the Department of Internal Affairs of the Spanish National Police .

The former lawyer of the Cierco brothers, Jaume Bartumeu, confirmed the threats and extortions of the Spanish police in the Cierco.

On August 22, 2016, the BPA case's Judge Canòlich Mingorance decided to notify the creation of two new causes as a result of the statements made by the Cierco brothers and sent an order to start a criminal investigation about the presumed threats and coercion exercised by the Government of Spain over the Managers of the Private Bank of Andorra to filter information that would undermine the independence process.

On August 30, 2016, it was announced by the investigative commission formed by the Parliament of Catalonia that the Prime Minister of Spain, Mariano Rajoy participated in the operation. The president sent his head of Cabinet, Jorge Moragas, and the Secretary of State for Commerce, Jaime García-Legaz, to Andorra to get the BPA owners to hand over bank statements, violating Andorran law.

On July 18, 2017, the commission announced their intent to present a demand against the ten people under investigation for refusing to testify before the commission, all of them high-ranking officials of the Spanish government. Doing so is a crime under Spanish law.

As of July 20, 2017 the investigation has reached impasse due to the blocking of any proposal in congress.

In 2025, Villarejo, the former Spanish National Police Commissioner, testified in court that the Spanish government targeted Banca Privada d’Andorra (BPA) as part of Operation Catalonia. He alleged that in 2014, Spanish officials threatened BPA's executives with closure if they did not hand over private and confidential financial information on pro-independence Catalan politician, Jordi Pujol. Spanish officials instructed him to send misleading information to the U.S. Agency FinCEN that would lead to the closure of BPA if they didn't comply.

Villarejo later confirmed Rajoy's role in Operation Catalonia in his 2025 court testimony and on a television interview.

The Spanish political party Junts has formally requested the government declassify information relating to the Operation Catalonia.

FinCenn rescinded its money laundering warning in 2016.

Between 2017 and 2019, Spanish courts dismissed multiple cases against BPA, finding it not guilty of money laundering, raising questions about whether the Spanish government provided U.S. authorities with false or misleading information to trigger the FinCEN money laundering alert against BPA.

== List of people related to the case ==
This lists people currently or previously included as part of the operation.

- Jorge Fernández Díaz: Operation Catalonia was carried out during his term as Minister of the Interior during which he commanded the National Police. The leaked recordings of his conversations with Daniel de Alfonso in October 2014 indicate that he directed the plot and that Rajoy was informed about it. With Alfonso, he reviewed which of the investigations by the anti-fraud office could be used against the parties of the pro-independence movement.
- Jorge Moragas: when he was head of the Spanish cabinet, Moragas sent several text messages to Victoria Álvarez to convince her to tell everything she knew about the Pujol family.
- Daniel de Alfonso: while he headed the Antifraud Office of Catalonia (2011–2016) he met with Fernández Díaz in Madrid to discuss what were the best tools they had for disassemble the political side of the independence movement. He also contracted Giménez Raso and Redondo Rodríguez using state funds, they are linked to José Manuel Villarejo and the operation.
- Eugenio Pino: while he was the assistant deputy director of the National Police Corps, he considered to have been the puppeteer who really moved the strings of the operation within the police. Martín Blas, Fuentes Gago and, in theory, even Villarejo followed his orders. He is now retired.
- José Ángel Fuentes Gago: he was the right-hand man of Eugenio Pino and who would have promoted the meeting between De Alfonso and the minister. He investigated the diverse assets of Villarejo and concluded that it was not irregular. Currently assigned to the Embassy of The Hague.
- José Manuel Villarejo: alias "Manuel Villar", retired commissary of the National Police Corps of Spain, is the only one who has admitted the existence of the operation of Catalonia – without mentioning it by name – for which he affirms to have worked through private companies that he combined with his position in the police. He's been in a feud with Martín Blas, since he tried to involve him in the Emperador case. He would have also pressured Victoria Álvarez to present a demand.
- Rafael Redondo Rodríguez: private detective and lawyer, partner of commissary Villarejo, with whom he shares a position or a directive position in eight companies, and thirteen with the son of the commisary. He also accompanied Victoria Álvarez to testify in Madrid to demand Pujol.
- Antonio Giménez Raso: senior police officer and member of the business network of commissary Villarejo, pretended to be an active agent of the police's anti-corruption unit under the name of Andrés García, to trick at least one witness of the case Pujol. He works with Redondo in a company also did it before in a company contracted by Alfonso to look for microphones and cameras in the anti-fraud offices. According to two complaints and a series of messages from WhatsApp, he was an intermediary between the police force of the operation Catalonia and the detectives Peribáñez and Tamarit, who had made reports for the anti-independent police plot.
- Marcelino Martín Blas: alias "Félix" while he was the head of Internal Affairs of the National Police, was one of the strong men of Pino and directed the secret police unit until Fernandez Diaz dismissed him. He has in an open dispute with Villarejo, who considers him a man of the Centro Nacional de Inteligencia, with whom he is also confronted. He traveled to Barcelona with Olivera in 2012 to try to persuade the prosecutors Bermejo and Sánchez Elled to reactivate the investigation of the Millet case, with a draft of an apocryphal report, and to search the CDC headquarters. After not accomplishing it, the draft was leaked, based on information extracted from the internet.
- José Luis Olivera: while head of the Economic and Fiscal Crimes Unit (UDEF) he traveled with Martín Blas to Barcelona. He is the current director of the Center for Intelligence against Terrorism and Organized Crime (CITCO)
- María Victoria Álvarez: after cutting off her relationship with Jordi Pujol Ferrusola, Álvarez launched the Pujol case by uncovering the alleged evasion of capital of the family in front of judge Pablo Ruz in the National Court. But when she declared she had already explained many of the events to Sánchez-Camacho three years ago, in a controversial lunch at the La Camarga restaurant in Barcelona, which was made in July 2010. The lunch was secretly recorded and was later leaked to the media.
- Alícia Sánchez-Camacho: while she was the president of the Catalan PP, she knew the irregularities of the Pujol family, at least three years before they were taken to the courts, following the lunch at La Camarga with Álvarez. There she told him that she had good contacts with the police and that she reported everything to Rajoy and Moragas. Despite assuring that she did not know she was being recorded by the private detective agency Método 3, she stopped the judicial process against the detective agency with an agreement.
- Javier de la Rosa: lawyer and entrepreneur, who is one of the main sources of commissary Villarejo about the Pujol family, and could have been paid with reserved funds in exchange for becoming an informer. He provided data on the eldest son of Pujol to the judicial cause. Redondo accompanied him to testify before Judge Ruz.
- Francisco Nicolás Gómez Iglesias: better known as Petit Nicholas, is a law student who would have pretended to be a collaborator with the Centro Nacional de Inteligencia, the Rajoy administration and the Spanish monarchy. He recorded himself offering money to De la Rosa in exchange for information about Pujol. He was arrested in October 2014 and the first media source to mention it was a digital site linked to Villarejo.
- Julián Peribáñez and Antonio Tamarit: detectives of Metodo 3 that would have done surveillance of Catalan politicians and members of the Mossos|Mossos d'Esquadra for the operation.
- Celestino Barroso: Attache of the Ministry of Interior to the embassy of Spain in Andorra.
- Bonifacio Díaz: alias "Boni", ex-attache from the Ministry of Interior to the embassy of Spain in Andorra.
