= Military Museum of the Legion =

Museum in Spain

- Sala-museo de la Legión
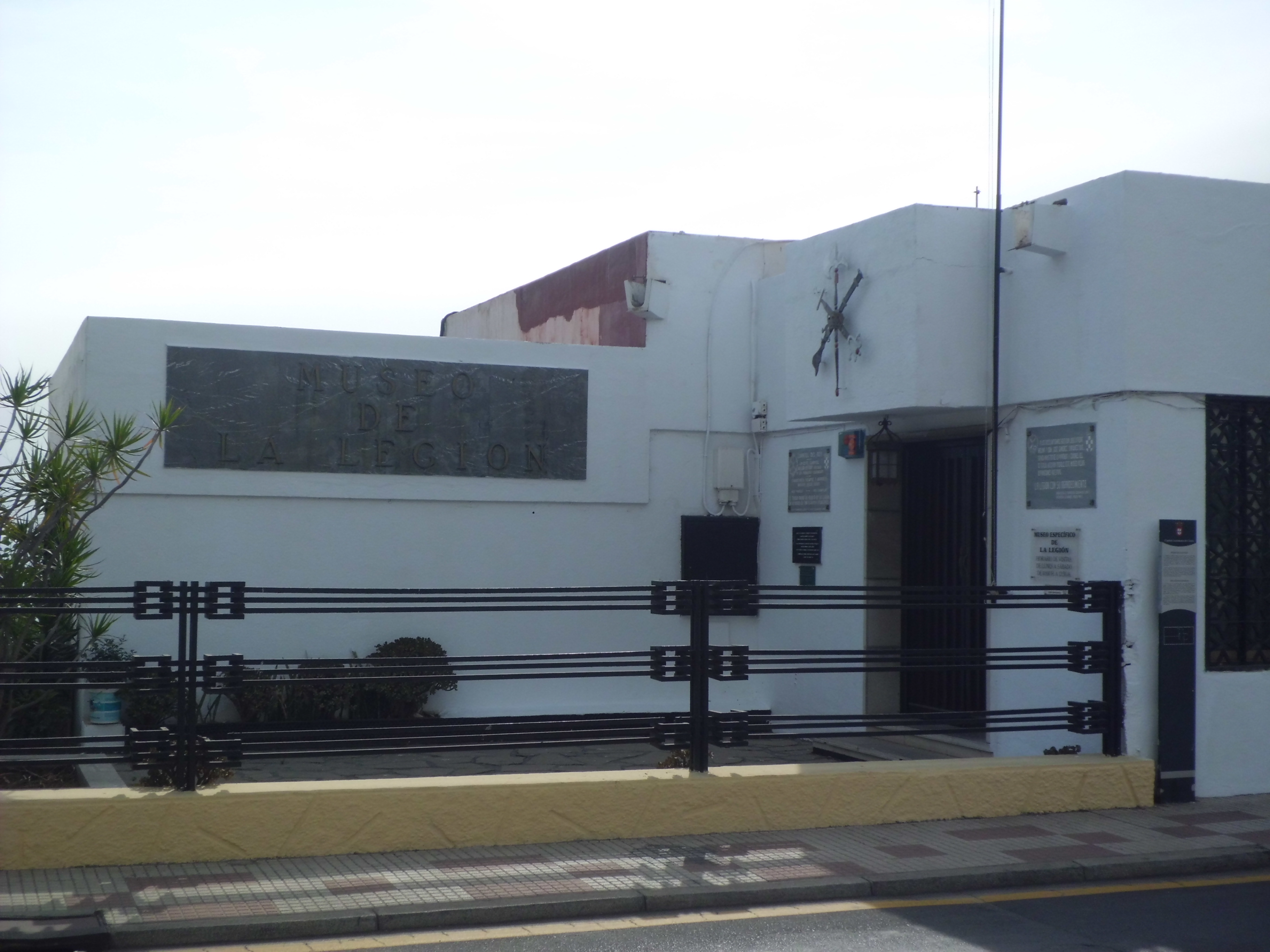
- Military Museum of the Legion
- Established: 1940
- Location: Ceuta (Spain)
- Coordinates: 35°53′12″N 5°18′46″W
- Owner: Ministry of Defence
- Website: Museum site

The Military Museum of the Legion was established in 1940 to celebrate the Spanish Legion. The Legion and its museum moved to Ceuta in 1956 when Morocco gained independence from Spain. At first the museum was in a small room of the barracks of the 2nd Regiment (Tercio) of the Legion in Dar-Riffien (Tetouan). Upon the Moroccan independence, the museum was moved to the Barracks of El Serrallo but a purpose-built building was constructed in 1978 on the Paseo de Colón.
