= Office of the Comptroller General of the Defence =

- Emblem of the Spanish Military Audit Corps

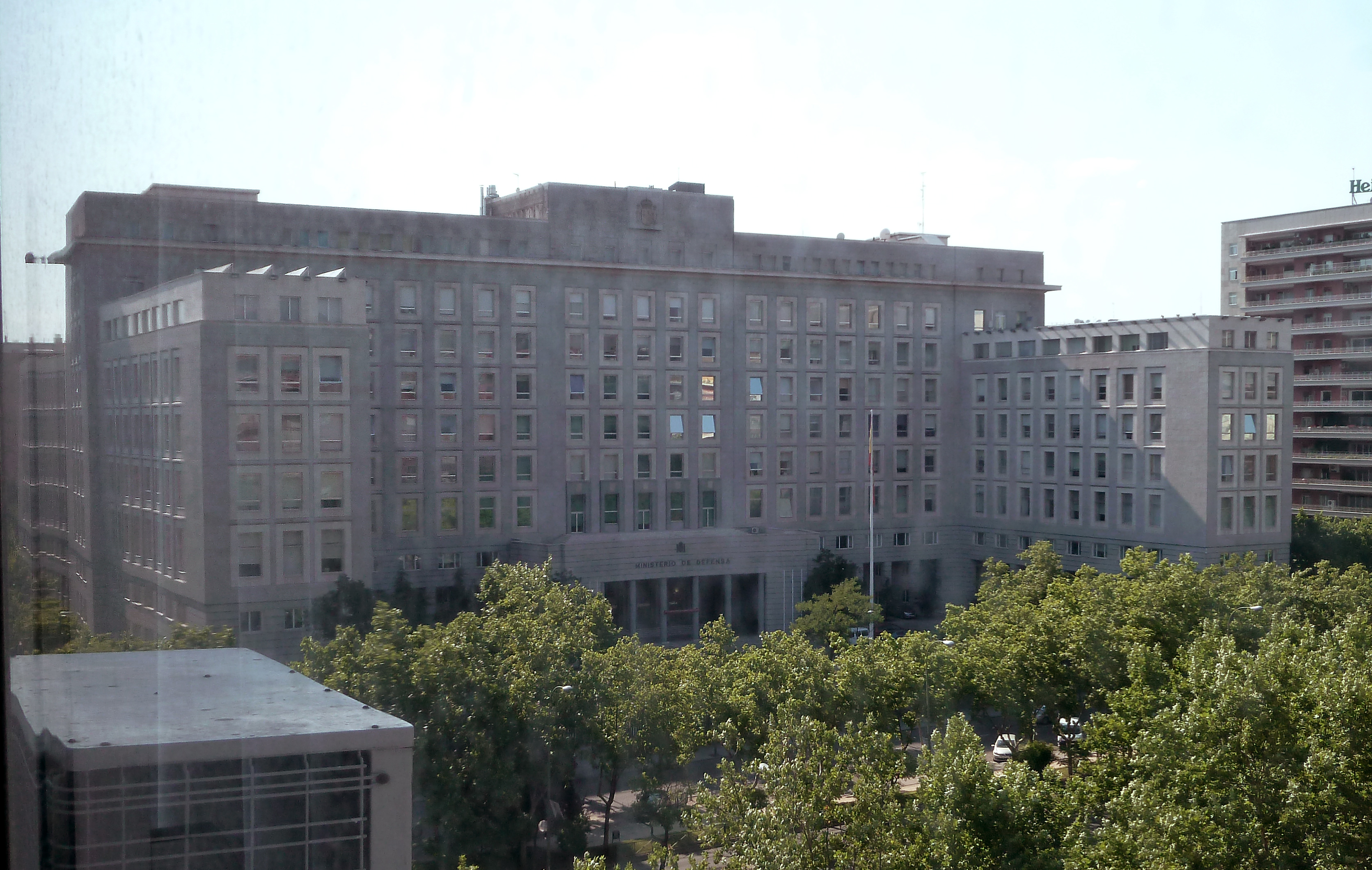
- Ministry of Defence main headquarters

Agency overview
- Formed: November 2, 1977; 48 years ago
- Preceding agencies: Army' Comptroller General Office; Navy' Comptroller General Office; Air Force' Comptroller General Office
- Headquarters: Paseo de la Castellana 109; Madrid
- Agency executive: María Teresa Gordillo López, Comptroller General of the Defence

The Office of the Comptroller General of the Defence (Spanish: Intervención General de la Defensa) is a department of the Ministry of Defence of Spain that exercises the internal audit of the economic and financial management of the Ministry and of the public agencies dependent on it. Likewise, it is responsible for acting as the military notary in the form and conditions established by the laws and for advising in matters of its competence to the superior and directive departments of the Ministry. The Office is integrated in the Undersecretariat of Defence but it reports to the Comptroller General of the State.

The Office of the Comptroller General is integrated by staff from the Military Audit Corps and it is headed by the Comptroller General of the Defence, who is the official responsible for issuing the necessary instructions to ensure proper coordination and unity of judgment.

The current comptroller general is divisional general María Teresa Gordillo López, who assumed the office in December 2024. She is the first woman to hold the office.

== History ==
For much of Spain's military history, the different branches of the Armed Forces were managed by various government departments. In 1977, the three existing military ministries at that time—Army, Navy and Air—were unified under the Ministry of Defence. With this unification, a single audit department is created for the entire Ministry. The process was completed in 1985, when the three military audit corps were also unified.

== Organization chart ==
The Office of the Comptroller General of the Defence (IGD) is structure through two large structures; one central and another decentralized.

=== Central services ===
The central structure of the IGD is integrated by:

- The Division for Intervention, Supervision and Economic-Fiscal Legal Analysis. This Division coordinates the performance of the comptroller delegations in the superior and directive departments of the Ministry and in its public agencies, with the sole exception of those activities that refer to the exercise of financial control, whose competence is attributed to the Division for Financial Control and Audits. In order to exercise its functions, it has two departments of its own: the Area for Intervention and Control and the Area for Economic-Fiscal Legal Analysis.
- The Division for Financial Control and Audits. This division, like the previous one, has coordination tasks on comptroller delegations but in its field of competence. Likewise, the division is also responsible for the audit teams which report to the Comptroller General of the Defense, through the Division Chief. It has two departments: the Audit Area and the Area for Permanent Financial Control and Control of Economic and Budgetary Management.
- The Defence Comptrolling General Unit, which is responsible for the study and processing of acts related to the economic and financial management of the Ministry of Defense whose internal control is responsibility of the Office of the Comptroller General of the State.

=== Decentralized services ===
The decentralized structure of the Office consists of:

- The comptroller delegations in the Ministry's departments and agencies and in the Defence Staff.
- The central comptroller delegations in the Army, Navy and Air Force.
- The Peripheral Comptroller Delegations. This are:
  - The Territorial Offices of the Comptroller General.
  - The comptroller delegations in the units, centers and agencies of the Armed Forces. These Delegated Interventions will be integrated, where appropriate, in the Territorial Offices.
  - The comptroller delegations deployed in active operations of the Armed Forces.

== Comptroller General of the Defence ==
The position of Comptroller General of the Defense is carried out by a divisional general of the Military Audit Corps. Due to this, the Comptroller General has preference over the other divisional generales and it is responsible for the general inspection of the Military Audit Corps regarding personnel, salaries, traditions and rewards, without prejudice to the powers of the Under Secretary of Defence and the Director-General for Personnel. The Comptroller General has the rank of director-general.

=== Secretariat ===
The Comptroller General has a secretariat as a direct support body, which is responsible for the registration and administrative management of the files and reports that are processed in the IGD; the computer coordination of the IGD; and the functions regarding the military notary.

=== List of comptrollers general ===
1. Gonzalo Prego Meirás (1977–1980)
2. Alfredo Boya Saura (1980–1981)
3. Alfredo Blasco González (1981–1982)
4. Carlos Ibáñez Muñoz (1982–1984)
5. Rafael Hitos Amaro (February–November 1984)
6. José Arribas de Pablo (1984–1987)
7. Luis Ignacio Sagardia Menéndez (1987–1989)
8. José Elizondo Martínez (1989–1992)
9. Antonio Yelo Molina (1992–1996)
10. Armando Bescós Aznar (1996–1998)
11. Antonio López Cediel (1998–1999)
12. Eduardo Esteban Ureta (1999–2001)
13. Juan Miguel Teijeiro de la Rosa (2001–2004)
14. Ricardo Martínez Grande (2004–2005)
15. Antonio Zúñiga Pérez del Molino (2005–2010)
16. Luis Lloret Gadea (2010–2013)
17. Ángel Méndez García (2013–2014)
18. Manuel Leria Mosquera (2014–2017)
19. Carlos Calavia Pascual (2017–2020)
20. José Luis Gómez Corral (2020–2024)
21. María Teresa Gordillo López (2024–present)
