= Secretary of State for Defence (Spain) =

Second-highest-ranking official in the Ministry of Defence of Spain

- Secretario de Estado de Defensa
- Coat of Arms used by the Government

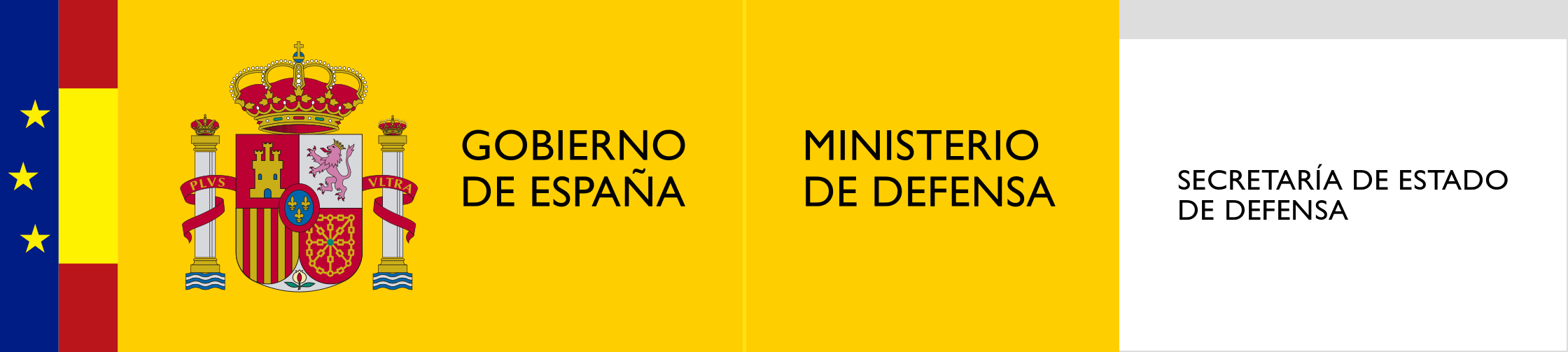

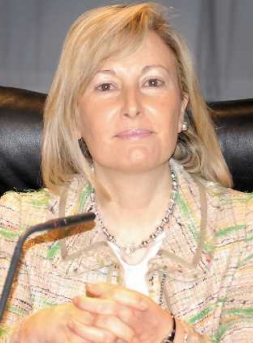
- Incumbent; Amparo Valcarce since 11 May 2022
- Ministry of Defence
- Style: The Most Excellent (formal); Mr./Ms. Secretary of State (informal)
- Abbreviation: SEDEF
- Reports to: Minister of Defence
- Seat: Ministry of Defence HQ, Paseo de la Castellana no. 109
- Nominator: Minister of Defence
- Appointer: The Monarch
- Term length: No fixed term
- Constituting instrument: Royal Decree 135/1984
- Precursor: Under-Secretary of Defence
- Formation: 25 January 1984; 42 years ago
- First holder: Eduardo Serra Rexach
- Website: defensa.gob.es

The secretary of state for defence (SEDEF) is a senior minister of the Spanish Ministry of Defence responsible for assisting the minister in the policies regarding armament and materiel, military research, development and innovation, economic management, infrastructure, environment, ICT and digital transformation.

Although the secretary of state has the same administrative rank as the Chief of the Defence Staff, the SEDEF does not have military authority. The officeholder is appointed by the Monarch on the advice of the Minister of Defence. The current Secretary of State for Defence, since 11 May 2022, is Ms. Amparo Valcarce, former Under-Secretary of Defence.

== History ==
The position of Secretary of State for Defence was established during the 1984 military administration reform. The Secretariat of State addressed "the need to formulate a common policy and ensure its coordinated management across the three military branches".

To achieve this objetive, the secretary of state assumed responsabilities from the Under-Secretary of Defence regarding economic and armament affairs, and replaced it as the second-in-command to the minister. Also, a new Directorate-General for Infrastructure was created to coordinate the military to unify and coordinate the policy on military construction and facilities.

This organizational structure has remained stable over the last few decades, with two exceptions. First, in 2010, digital and communications powers within the Directorate-General for Infrastructure were reorganized, merging various bodies to create the Deputy Directorate-General for Information and Communication Technologies. This body—known since 2015 as the Centre for Information and Communication Systems and Technologies—was elevated to the rank of directorate-general in 2023 and currently reports to the secretary of state. Since 2026, this centre is also responsible for ensuring the security of data and communications for the Royal Household.

Second, in September 2024 a new Directorate-General for Strategy and Innovation of the Defence Industry was established assuming part of the responsibilities of the Directorate-General for Armament and Material regarding business internationalization, military industry support and R&D&I policies.

== Organization ==
From the Secretary of State for Defence depends:

- The Directorate-General for Strategy and Innovation of the Defense Industry (DIGIED).
  It is responsible for designing the national defense industrial strategy, planning weapons and material and R&D&I policies, as well as helping the internationalization of Spanish companies.
- The Directorate-General for Armament and Material (DGAM).
  It is the department responsible for the planning and development of the armament and material policy of the Ministry, as well as the supervision and direction of its execution.
- The Directorate-General for Economic Affairs (DIGENECO).
  It is the governing body responsible for the planning and development of the economic and financial policy of the Ministry, as well as the supervision and direction of its execution.
- The Directorate-General for Infrastructure (DIGENIN).
  It is the body responsible for the planning and development of the infrastructure, environmental and energy policies of the Ministry, as well as the supervision and direction of its execution.
- The Centre for Information and Communication Systems and Technologies.
  To which corresponds the planning and development of the policies of the systems, technologies and information security of the Department, as well as the supervision and direction of its execution. For these purposes, the competent bodies in the aforementioned matters of the Armed Forces and the autonomous agencies of the Department depend functionally on this center.

Insignia of the Military Constructions Service

The following agencies also depends from the SEDEF:

- The National Institute for Aerospace Technology.
  It is the defense agency in charge of research and technological development in the fields of aeronautics, space, hydrodynamics, security and defense. It is commonly considered as Spain's Space Agency, but Spain has not have a Space Agency.
- The Institute for Housing, Infrastructure and Defense Equipment.
  It is the agency of the Ministry of Defense responsible for administering the assets of the ministry as well as ensuring that all military personnel and their families have a place to live.
  - The Military Constructions Service.
    It is a department of the Institute for Housing, Infrastructure and Defense Equipment responsible for the construction of military installations and other constructions of national security interest.

== List of secretaries of state ==
For the purpose of this list, the date used is the date on which the decree of appointment or dismissal received royal assent, which may differ from the date of publication or of the effective taking of office.

Name	Term of office			Government		Ref.
Name	Start	End	Duration	Prime Minister	Monarch	Ref.
Eduardo Serra Rexach (born 1946)	8 February 1984	17 July 1987	3 years, 159 days	Felipe González (1982–1996)	Juan Carlos I (1975–2014)	
Office vacant during this inverval.				Felipe González (1982–1996)	Juan Carlos I (1975–2014)	
Rafael de la Cruz Corcoll (1945–2012)	22 April 1988	11 October 1991	3 years, 172 days	Felipe González (1982–1996)	Juan Carlos I (1975–2014)	
José Miguel Hernández Vázquez (1938–2013)	11 October 1991	2 October 1992	357 days	Felipe González (1982–1996)	Juan Carlos I (1975–2014)	
Antonio Flos Bassols	9 October 1992	28 April 1995	2 years, 201 days	Felipe González (1982–1996)	Juan Carlos I (1975–2014)	
Office vacant during this inverval.				Felipe González (1982–1996)	Juan Carlos I (1975–2014)	
Juan Ramón García Secades (born 1948)	7 July 1995	10 May 1996	308 days	Felipe González (1982–1996)	Juan Carlos I (1975–2014)	
Pedro Morenés (born 1948)	24 May 1996	5 May 2000	3 years, 347 days	José María Aznar (1996–2004)	Juan Carlos I (1975–2014)	
Fernando Díez Moreno (born 1941)	5 May 2000	19 April 2004	3 years, 350 days	José María Aznar (1996–2004)	Juan Carlos I (1975–2014)	
Francisco Pardo (born 1962)	19 April 2004	20 April 2007	3 years, 1 day	José Luis Rodríguez Zapatero (2004–2011)	Juan Carlos I (1975–2014)	
Soledad López Fernández (born 1959)	20 April 2007	14 April 2008	360 days	José Luis Rodríguez Zapatero (2004–2011)	Juan Carlos I (1975–2014)	
Constantino Méndez (1950–2023)	14 April 2008	30 December 2011	3 years, 260 days	José Luis Rodríguez Zapatero (2004–2011)	Juan Carlos I (1975–2014)	
Pedro Argüelles Salaverría (born 1950)	5 January 2012	18 November 2016	4 years, 318 days	Mariano Rajoy (2011–2018)	Juan Carlos I (1975–2014)	
Pedro Argüelles Salaverría (born 1950)	5 January 2012	18 November 2016	4 years, 318 days	Mariano Rajoy (2011–2018)	Felipe VI (2014–present)	
Agustín Conde (born 1965)	18 November 2016	8 June 2018	1 year, 202 days	Mariano Rajoy (2011–2018)	Felipe VI (2014–present)	
Ángel Olivares Ramírez (born 1955)	8 June 2018	23 June 2020	2 years, 15 days	Pedro Sánchez (2018–)	Felipe VI (2014–present)	
Esperanza Casteleiro (born 1956)	30 June 2020	10 May 2022	1 year, 314 days	Pedro Sánchez (2018–)	Felipe VI (2014–present)	
Amparo Valcarce (born 1956)	10 May 2022	Incumbent	4 years, 147 days	Pedro Sánchez (2018–)	Felipe VI (2014–present)	
