= Bank Under Siege =

2024 Spanish television miniseries

- Promotional release poster
- Spanish: Asalto al Banco Central
- Written by: Patxi Amezcua
- Directed by: Daniel Calparsoro
- Starring: Miguel Herrán; María Pedraza; Hovik Keuchkerian; Isak Férriz; Patricia Vico; Roberto Enríquez; Tito Valverde; Fernando Cayo
- Music by: Carlos Jean
- Country of origin: Spain
- Original language: Spanish
- No. of seasons: 1
- No. of episodes: 5

Production
- Cinematography: Tommie Ferreras
- Production company: Brutal Media

Original release
- Network: Netflix
- Release: 8 November 2024 – present

Bank Under Siege (Spanish: Asalto al Banco Central) is a Spanish crime thriller television miniseries written by Patxi Amezcua and directed by Daniel Calparsoro. It stars Miguel Herrán, María Pedraza, Hovik Keuchkerian and Isak Férriz. It fictionalises the Assault on the Central Bank of Barcelona in 1981.

== Plot ==
The plot explores the Assault on the Central Bank of Barcelona in May 1981, three months after the 23-F coup d'état attempt, as a group of 11 robbers took over 200 hostages and demanded the liberation of putschist general Antonio Tejero and three of his collaborators.

== Cast ==
- Miguel Herrán as José Juan Martínez Gómez "El Rubio", "Número 1"
- María Pedraza as Maider Garmendia
- Hovik Keuchkerian as Bernardo García "Berni"
- Isak Férriz as Francisco "Paco" López
- Patricia Vico as Isabel Ruig
- Tito Valverde as general José Luis Aramburu Topete
- Roberto Álamo as Emilio Alonso Manglano
- Xavi Lite as Antonio Tejero
- Enrique Berrendero as Narcís Serra
- Óscar Rabadán as Leopoldo Calvo-Sotelo
- Fernando Cayo as general Pajuelo
- Roberto Enríquez como delegado del Gobierno
- Juanjo Ballesta as Cuevas

== Production ==
Produced by Brutal Media for Netflix, the series was written by Patxi Amezcua and directed by Daniel Calparsoro. Tommie Ferreras was charged with the cinematography and Calparsoro's recurring collaborator Carlos Jean with the musical score.

== Release ==
The 5-episode miniseries was made available on Netflix on 8 November 2024.

== Reception ==
Paula Martínez of Cinemanía deemed Bank Under Siege to be "an entertaining series with good pace, tension and interest that takes us through an important (and unknown to many) moment in our history".

Raquel Hernández Luján of HobbyConsolas gave the series 72 points ('good') declaring it "a brave, addictive and fast-paced miniseries that takes us to a recent conflict [while] spurring our curiosity.

== See also ==
- 2024 in Spanish television
