= National Cryptologic Center =

Spanish intelligence agency

- Centro Criptológico Nacional

Agency overview
- Formed: March 12, 2004
- Jurisdiction: Government of Spain
- Headquarters: Madrid, Spain
- Agency executives: Esperanza Casteleiro, Director; Luis Jiménez Muñoz, Deputy Director
- Parent agency: National Intelligence Center
- Website: www.ccn.cni.es

The National Cryptologic Center (CCN) is a department of the Spanish National Intelligence Center responsible for cryptanalyzing and deciphering by manual procedures, electronic media and cryptophony, as well as to carry out technological-cryptographic investigations and to train the personnel specialized in cryptology. The CCN is legally regulated by Royal Decree 421/2004, of March 12.

From CCN depends:

- CCN-CERT. An expert group that handles computer security incidents.
- Certification body. A body responsible for certify if the Information and communications technology systems are secure.

== Functions ==
The functions of the CCN are:

- Develop and disseminate standards, instructions, guides and recommendations to ensure the security of information and communication technology systems of the State Administration.
- Train the personnel of the administration specialized in the field of the security of the systems of the information and communications through the CCN-CERT.
- To constitute the Certification Body of the National Scheme of Evaluation and Certification of the Security of Information Technologies.
- Assess and accredit the ability of cipher products and IT systems to process, store or transmit information securely.
- Coordinate the acquisition and development of security technology.
- Protect classified information.
- Establish relationships with similar bodies in other countries.

== Director ==
The director of CCN is the same as the director of the CNI, Félix Sanz Roldán. However, the competency of the center's management relapse in a deputy director supported by an assistant deputy director. The functions of the deputy director of the CCN are:

- Ensure compliance with the functions entrusted to the CCN.
- Certifies the security of information technologies and cryptology.
- Ensure the protection of classified information relating to information and telecommunications systems.

== Agreements ==
The CCN has signed two important agreements with Microsoft in order to join the Government Security Program (GSP):

- The first of them in 2004, when an agreement was signed to access the Windows source code, with Microsoft's central servers in the United States.
- The second one in 2006, quite similar, aimed at obtaining access to the source Microsoft Office.

== See also ==
- Centro Nacional de Inteligencia
- Spanish Intelligence Community
