= National Intelligence Centre (Spain) =

Spanish official intelligence agency

- Centro Nacional de Inteligencia

Agency overview
- Formed: 6 May 2002
- Preceding agency: Centro Superior de Información de la Defensa (CESID)
- Jurisdiction: Government of Spain
- Headquarters: Madrid, Spain
- Employees: Classified
- Annual budget: €337.1 million (2023)
- Agency executive: Esperanza Casteleiro, Director
- Parent agency: Ministry of Defence
- Child agencies: National Office for Security; National Cryptologic Center; National Office of Intelligence and Counterintelligence
- Website: www.cni.es

The National Intelligence Centre (Spanish: Centro Nacional de Inteligencia, CNI) is the Spanish official intelligence agency, acting as both its foreign and domestic intelligence agency. Its headquarters are located next to the A-6 motorway near Madrid. The CNI is the successor of the Centro Superior de Información de la Defensa, the Higher Centre for Defence Intelligence. Its main target areas are North Africa and South America and it operates in more than 80 countries. CNI's official budget for 2023 is approximately €337.1 million (the CNI can get further resources from the classified funds).

The Secretary of State-Director of the CNI is currently Esperanza Casteleiro.

== Goals and operation ==
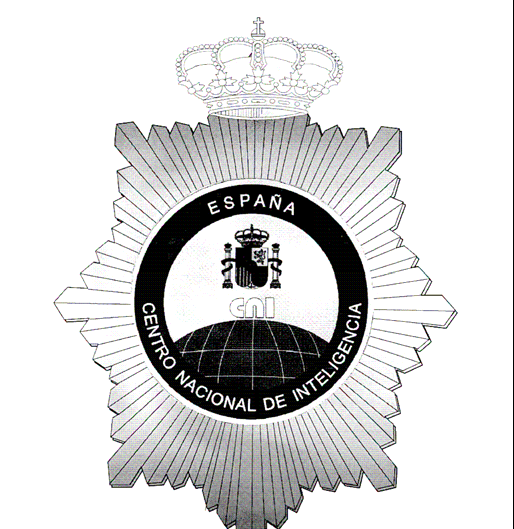
Badge of authority, CNI 2012

The centre's essential goal is to provide the Spanish Government all the necessary information to prevent and avoid any risk or menace that affects the independence or integrity of Spain, its national interests, institutions and rule of law. In the same way, the law states that the specific goals of the CNI will be determined and approved yearly by the Council of Ministers. These goals will be included in a secret document, the Intelligence Guidelines.

Besides this organic control of the centre by the Ministers Council, there is also a judiciary control, given the fact certain activities require such intervention. This control is carried out by a judge of the Spanish Supreme Court, chosen by a qualified majority. In this sense, those actions requiring previous authorization by the court are those regarding communications interdiction, entry and registration at home or enterprise addresses, or any other would-be violations of the fundamental rights granted by the Spanish Constitution of 1978.

== Precedents and history ==
The first Spanish intelligence service was created in 1935, in a short-lived experience with an almost null activity, due to the Spanish Civil War paralysing its development. During the civil war, the Servicio de Información Militar (SIM) provided intelligence service to the Republicans while the Servicio de Información y Policía Militar (SIPM) provided intelligence service to the Nationalists. Both organizations were dissolved at the end of the civil war.

Student revolts by the end of the 1960s motivated the creation of a National Countersubversive Organization, which was the seed for the Servicio Central de Documentación (SECED), founded in 1972. The Centro Superior de Información de la Defensa (CESID) was formed between 1976 and 1977, from the fusion of the SECED and the High Staff of the Army Information Service (Spanish: Servicio de Información del Alto Estado Mayor (SIAEM)).

In 2001, the Government of the People's Party reached consensus with other political groups represented in the Congress of Deputies, in particular with the Spanish Socialist Workers' Party, to draft the laws that were to regulate the Spanish intelligence services. This was intended to reach the greatest possible consensus in the creation of such State Agencies in order to safeguard the democratic State, removing them, as much as possible, from party politics.

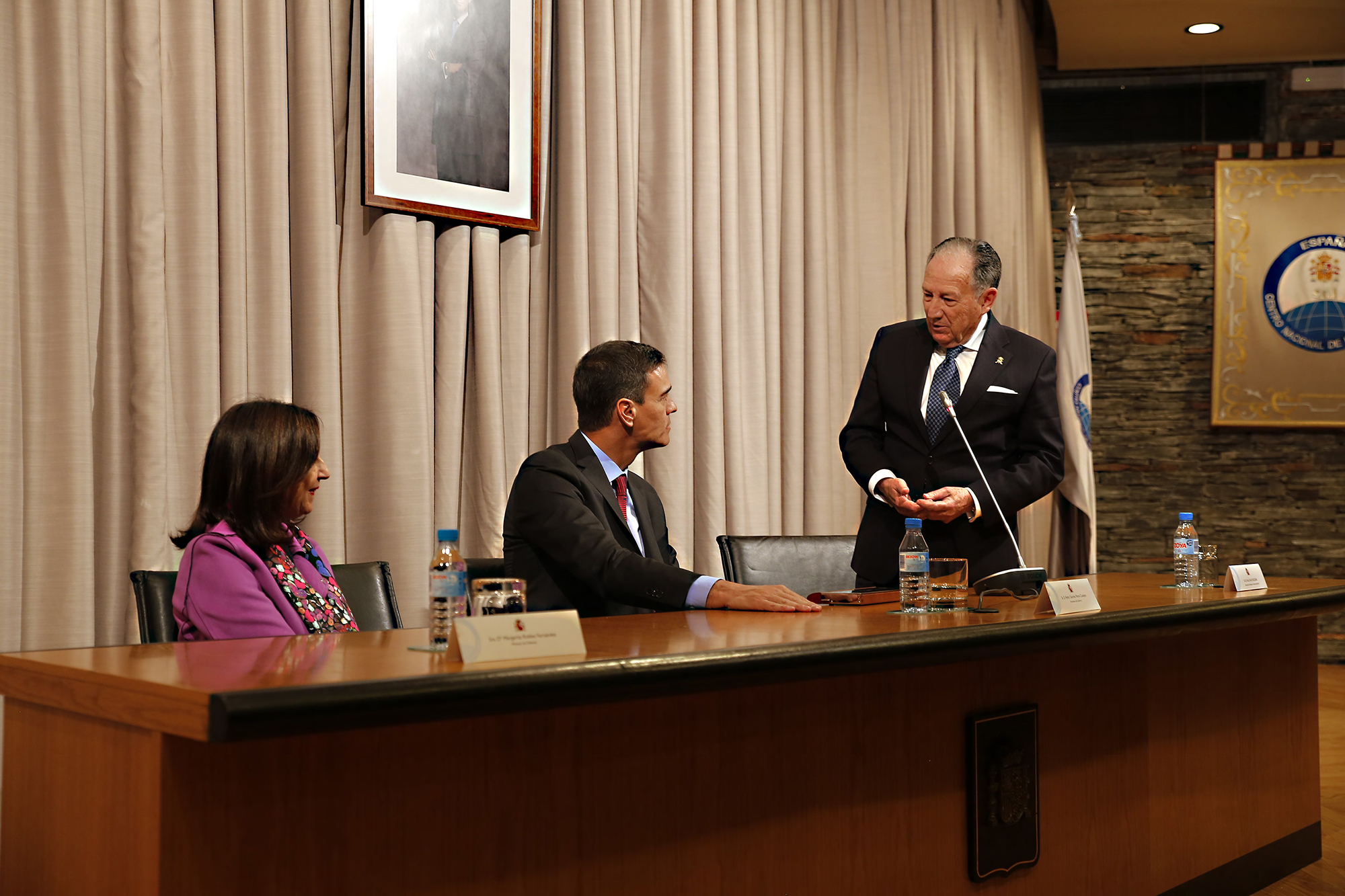
The Prime Minister Pedro Sánchez with the Defence Minister Margarita Robles and the then Director of the CNI Félix Sanz Roldán in 2019

In 2002, the current legal regulation of the National Intelligence Center (CNI) was reached, which was assigned a new name that simplifies and accurately determines its true function. The result of the aforementioned parliamentary agreements was the enactment of two complementary laws, one of which, Law 11/2002 of May 6, regulates the National Intelligence Center, while the other, of an organic nature (Organic Law 2/2002, of May 6), establishes judicial control prior to that certain actions must be submitted to the CNI. Later, in March 2004, the Royal Decree that regulates the National Cryptologic Center (CCN), a body attached to the CNI for the security of information technologies.

The legal framework of the CNI is completed by the provision relating to the statutory regime of its personnel. The personnel regulations of the previous organization date back to 1995. The Law 11/2002 provides for the development of a new statute for the Center's staff. The 1995 regulations were modified in 2004. In 2013, a new regulation for personnel was approved.

In 2011, after a ministerial reform undertaken by PM Mariano Rajoy, the CNI became attached to the Ministry of the Presidency but, after the change in government in 2018, PM Pedro Sánchez has once again assigned the CNI to the Ministry of Defence.

In 2013, thanks to the Global Surveillance Leaks by Edward Snowden, it was learned that the CNI has been collaborating with the NSA in the massive espionage of millions of Spaniards, directly intercepting or helping to intercept millions of metadata of call logs, text messages and emails.

In 2022 it was revealed that the CNI had spied on at least 18 phones of Catalan separatist politicians. In May 2022, the head of the CNI, Paz Esteban López, was then fired. Esteban later admitted in a committee of the Spanish parliament that her agency, after obtaining court approval, had the devices of Catalan separatists infected with the help of the Israeli spy software Pegasus.

In 2023, two United States consular officials were expelled from Spain after it was revealed that they had successfully bribed CNI intelligence agents for state secrets.

In 2024 the CNI was revealed to be responsible for carrying out a major illegal espionage operation against the Catalan movement through the use of Pegasus spyware.

== Directors of the CESID / CNI ==
- José María Bourgón López-Dóriga (1977–1979)
- Gerardo Mariñas (1979–1980)
- Narciso Carreras (1980–1981)
- Emilio Alonso Manglano (1981–1995)
- Félix Miranda (1995–1996)
- Javier Calderón (1996–2001)
- Jorge Dezcallar Manzanedo (civilian; 2001–2004)
- Alberto Saiz Cortés (civilian; 2004–2009)
- Félix Sanz Roldán (2009–2019)
- Paz Esteban López (civilian; 2019–2020, a.i.; 2020–2022)
- Esperanza Casteleiro (2022–)
