= Félix Sanz Roldán =

Spanish Army general (born 1945)

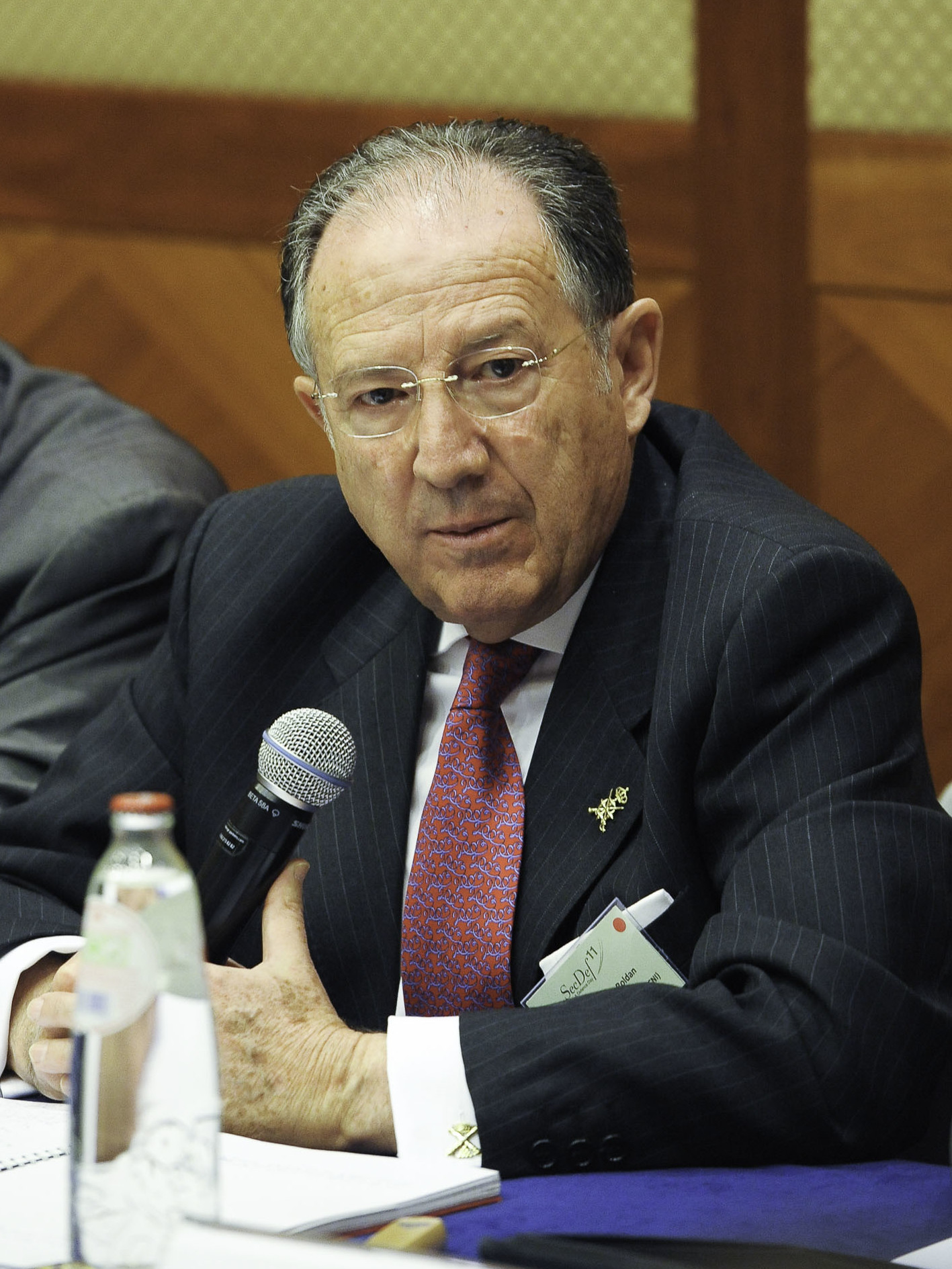

Director of the National Intelligence Centre
- In office July 6, 2009 – July 6, 2019
- Monarchs: Juan Carlos I (2009–2014); Felipe VI (2014–2019)
- Prime Minister: José Luis Rodríguez Zapatero (2009–2011); Mariano Rajoy (2011–2018); Pedro Sánchez (2018–2019)
- Deputy: Elena Sánchez Blanco (2009–2012); Beatriz Méndez de Vigo (2012–2017); Paz Esteban López (2017–2019)
- Preceded by: Alberto Saiz
- Succeeded by: Paz Esteban López

Chief of the Defence Staff
- In office June 26, 2004 – July 19, 2008
- Monarch: Juan Carlos I
- Prime Minister: José Luis Rodríguez Zapatero
- Preceded by: Antonio Moreno Barberá
- Succeeded by: José Julio Rodríguez Fernández

Personal details
- Born: January 20, 1945 (age 81) Uclés, Castilla-La Mancha, Spain

Military service
- Allegiance: Spain
- Branch/service: Spanish Army
- Years of service: 1962–2019
- Rank: General of the Army

Félix Sanz Roldán (born 20 January 1945) is a retired Spanish Army general and intelligence officer who served as Director of the National Intelligence Centre (CNI) from July 2009 to July 2019. He served as Chief of the Defence Staff (JEMAD) of the Spanish Armed Forces during the first government of prime minister José Luis Rodríguez Zapatero (2004–2008).

Sanz Roldán joined the Armed Forces in 1962 when he entered in the General Military Academy. As a military officer, he has been assigned to the Spanish Embassy in Washington D.C. as deputy military attaché and to several managing positions within the Spanish Army. In the Ministry of Defence, Sanz Roldán has served as deputy director-general for Plans and International Relations and as director-general for Defence Policy, before becoming Chief of the Defence Staff in 2004. He retired from the active service in 2019, after 57 years of service.

== Biography ==
=== Early life ===
Sanz Roldán was born in Uclés, Cuenca on January 20, 1945. In 2009, he was awarded Doctor Honoris Causa by the University Alfonso X the Wise in Madrid.

=== Military career ===
Sanz Roldán entered the General Military Academy, with the XXI Promotion of 1962, being promoted to lieutenant in 1966. As a Lieutenant, he served in the Recruitment Instruction Battalion nº1 in El-Aaiún, Spanish Sahara. He was also destined into Astorga, Leon and San Roque, Cádiz.

After being promoted to captain, he was destined to the Artillery Regiment Nº1 in Madrid. After completing his studies of General Staff, he held positions as Staff in the Armored Brigade XII in El Goloso, Madrid and in the Spanish-American Combined Joint Staff; He was the Head of Baton of Plana Mayor and Battery of Services, in the Artillery Group of ATP-XI Campaign in Campamento, and belonged to the Investigation and Doctrine Group of the Artillery Academy in Fuencarral.

After being promoted to commandant (or major) he was assigned as deputy military attaché to the Spanish Embassy in Washington, D.C., and later to the Section of Structures and Organic of the Division of Plans and Organization of the General Staff of the Army. Once promoted to lieutenant colonel, he was appointed to command the Artillery Group of the Self-Propelled Campaign XII of the Armored Brigade, in El Goloso, Madrid and, at his retirement, was assigned to the Military Mission of Spain before the Supreme Allied Commander Europe (SACEUR) in Mons, Belgium.

In July 1997, and as colonel, he was head of the International Treaties Section of the Division of Plans and Organization of the General Staff of the Army and Head of the Area of Relations with NATO / WEU of the Subdirectorate General for International Affairs of the Directorate-General for Defense Policy.

He was promoted to brigadier general in 1998 and he was appointed to the office of Deputy Director-General for Plans and International Relations in the Directorate-General for Defense Policy (DIGENPOL) of the Ministry of Defence. In 2001 he was promoted to major general.

=== Chief of the Defence Staff ===
In 2004 Sanz Roldán was promoted to lieutenant general and was appointed Director-General for Defence Policy. In the same year, he was appointed Chief of the Defence Staff (JEMAD) as well as promoted to General of the Army. He held this position until 2008, when the Council of Ministers appointed the lieutenant general, Julio Rodríguez Fernández, as substitute.

In 2008, after leaving the JEMAD position, Félix Sanz Roldán was appointed High Representative for the Spanish Presidency of the EU, with direct dependence on the President of the Government.

=== Director of the CNI ===
On July 2, 2009, Alberto Saiz resigned from the post of Director of the CNI after several attacks and criticisms of his management. In April, the newspaper El Mundo published information that assured, according to CNI sources, that Saiz had repeatedly used resources and public funds of the centre for personal use and enjoyment during his professional trips abroad. In May, he appeared before the Congressional Defense Committee stating that he "never" used public money to defray "no personal or private expenses." At the same time, the CNI ordered the withdrawal of three field agents at the request of the Cuban government, something that was seen by the members of the agency as a sign of weakness.

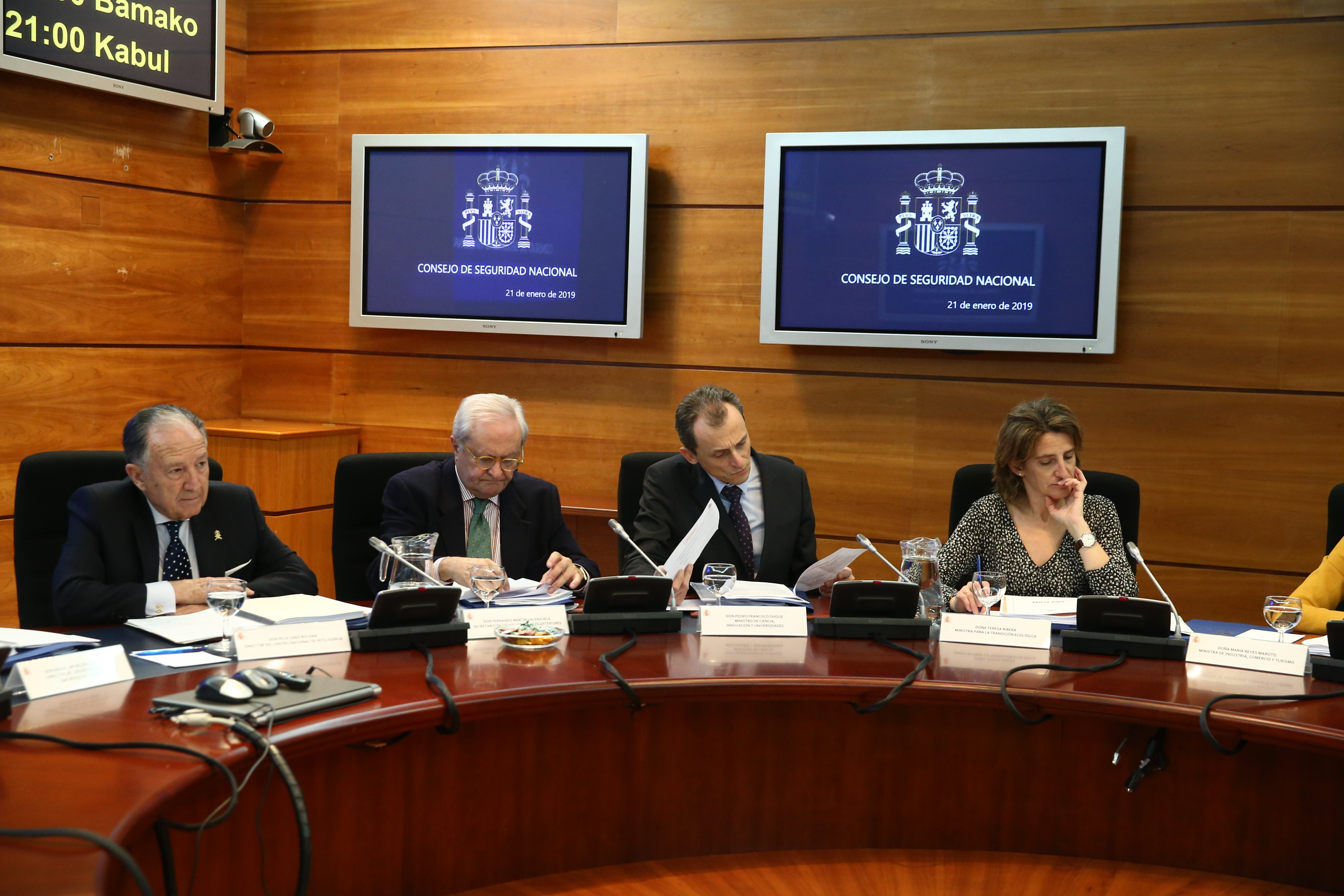
CNI Director, Sanz Roldán (left), along with other government officials in a National Security Council meeting in January 2019.

In June, he testified again before Congress rejecting again the affirmations about his misuse of public funds. Defence Minister Carme Chacón requested a full report about the CNI situation in the first days of July, provoking the director's resignation on July 9. That day, Sanz Roldán was appointed Director of the National Intelligence Center.

Sanz Roldán dedicated his first years as head of the agency to "pacify", due to the bad situation that the previous director had provoked between the agents and the governing bodies. In spite of the little recognition, during the first two years of his term the intelligence contributed by the CNI to the police forces of Spain and France contributed to the weakening of the terrorist band, as well as to the arrests of historical territorialists such as "Txeroki". In October 2011, the terrorist group called a "definitive cessation".

In 2012, Mariano Rajoy assumed the office of Prime Minister and trusted in Sanz Roldan to continue as head of the CNI. He revalidated his position as director of the CNI for a second term in 2014.

==== Little Nicolás Scandal ====
In late 2014, the National Police arrested Francisco Nicolás Gómez Iglesias, a 20-year-old man who for months had been posing as an important person with contacts in the government, the administration and the National Intelligence Centre. In November 2014, Francisco Nicolás gave interviews to Telecinco and El Mundo in which he claimed to have worked for the Spanish secret service, the Spanish royal family and the Office of the Deputy Prime Minister.

For these claims, the CNI filed criminal charges against him for "insults and slander", but was acquitted in May 2018.

==== Catalan referendum ====
At the end of 2017, Sanz Roldán and the agency received numerous criticisms for being unable to locate the polls that will be used for the 2017 independence referendum, a referendum declared illegal by the Spanish Government and the Constitutional Court. He was alone criticized for allowing former Catalan president, Carles Puigdemont, to flee to Belgium.

According to Sanz Roldán on September 29, 2018, the following day to the referendum, when he arrived to the CNI headquarters, there was many "long faces" and the "feeling" that the centre "could have done better". However, Sanz Roldán defended the work of the CNI and assured that he asked the government directly if the intelligence that the center had provided to the executive "had been useful to them," and the answer, he said, was "yes".

==== Villarejo and Corinna Scandal ====
Since 2014, Police Commissioner José Manuel Villarejo has been involved in several criminal cases against him for disclosure of secrets, membership in criminal organization and money laundering. In early 2019, José Manuel Villarejo sent a letter to the Prime Minister accusing Sanz Roldan of threatening certain judges of the National Court with data of their privacy so that they stop investigating issues that affect the CNI. He also accused him of working against the interests of Spain by supporting Venezuelan interests or allowing the leaks about the Spanish royal family.

Other accusations against him made by Villarejo has been to protect emeritus king Juan Carlos I by threatening and bribing Corinna zu Sayn Wittgenstein, a supposed lover of the monarch, who supposedly hides critical information for the former king of Spain. All this accusations has been denied by Sanz Roldán and the CNI.

In July 2019, the second five-years-term of the Director of the CNI, Sanz Roldán, ended. At that time, the Spanish government (Sánchez I Government) was a caretaker government due to the April 2019 general election. The impossibility of forming a government provoked that the Prime Minister could not renew the director for a new term or to nominate a new candidate. Due to this situation, Paz Esteban López, who was the Secretary-General of the CNI and, therefore, the agency's second authority, assumed the direction ad interim of the intelligence service, being the first woman to hold the post.

Sanz Roldán was awarded with the Grand Cross of the Military Merit for his services.

=== Activities in retirement ===
After leaving the CNI direction, Sanz Roldán was appointed Chairman of the Social Council of the University of Castilla–La Mancha in November 2019.

== Awards and honors ==
=== Awards ===
- Grand Cross of the Royal and Military Order of San Hermenegild.
- Cross of the Royal and Military Order of San Hermenegild
- Commander of the Royal and Military Order of San Hermenegild
- Grand Cross of Naval Merit
- Grand Cross of Military Merit
- Silver Cross of the Civil Guard Merit
- Grand Cross of the Order of St. Raymond of Peñafort
- 3 Crosses of Military Merit
- Cross of Aeronautical Merit
- Grand Cross of the Order of the Lithuanian Grand Duke Gediminas
- U.S. Distinguished Service Medal
- Grand Cordon of the Order of Military Merit of Morocco
- Commandeur of the National Order of the Legion of Honour

=== Honors ===
- Doctor honoris causa by the Alfonso X the Whise University.
- Doctor honoris causa by the King Juan Carlos University.
- Honorary Civil Guard officer
- Gold medal of Castilla-La Mancha.
- Badge of the Chief of the Defence Staff.

Military offices
Preceded by Antonio Moreno Barberá	Chief of the Defence Staff; 25 June 2004 – 18 July 2008	Succeeded by José Julio Rodríguez Fernández
