= Ministry of Defence (Spain) =

Government ministry of Spain

- Ministerio de Defensa
- Logotype

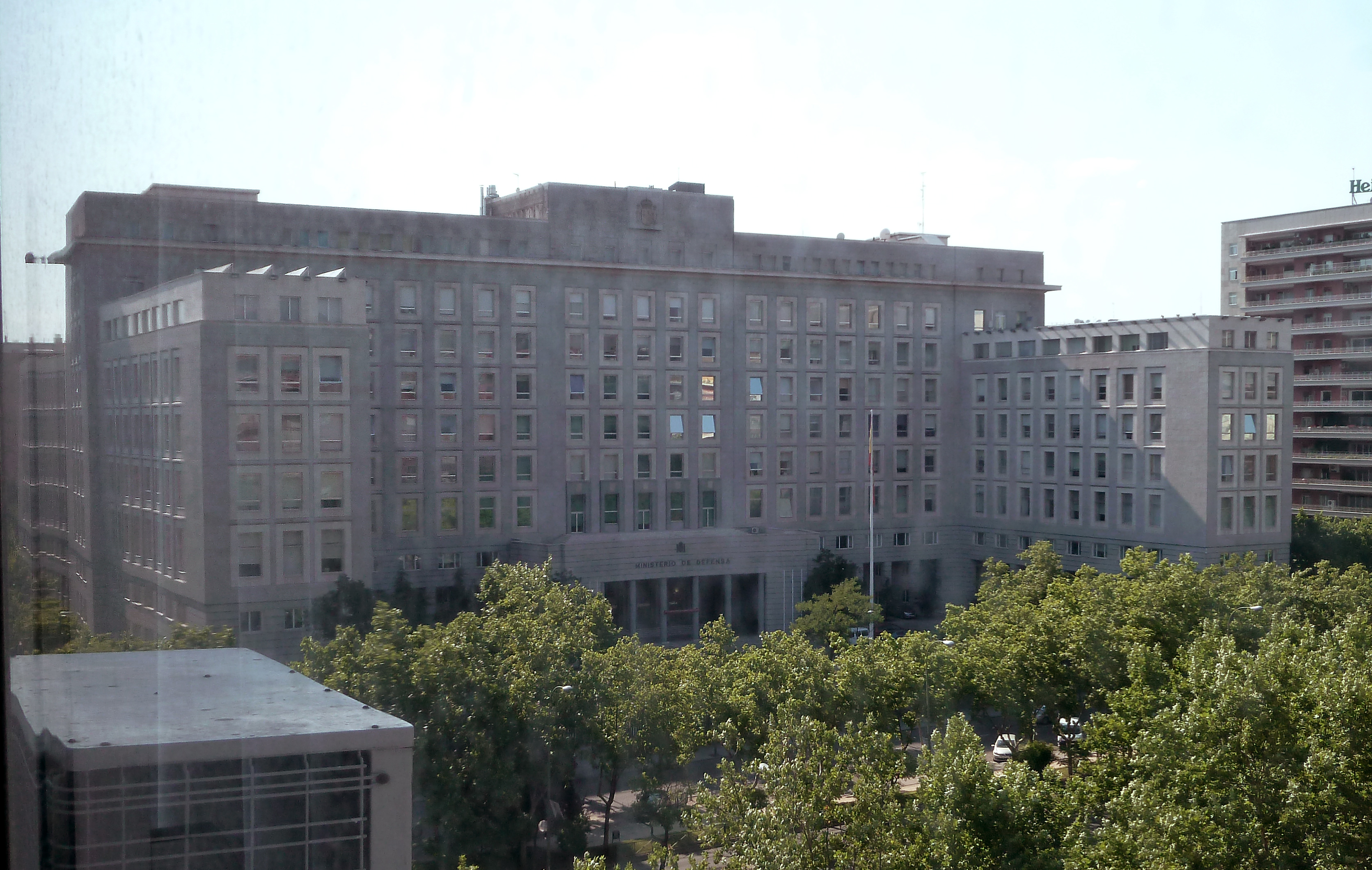
- Main headquarters

Agency overview
- Formed: November 30, 1714; 311 years ago (as Secretariat of State and of the Office of War); July 4, 1977 (as Ministry of Defence)
- Preceding agencies: Ministry of the Army; Ministry of the Navy; Ministry of the Air
- Type: Ministry
- Jurisdiction: Government of Spain
- Headquarters: 109 Paseo de la Castellana Madrid, Spain; 40.45587°N 3.69077°W
- Employees: 162,933 (31 December 2025) (Note: 148,519 military officers 14,414 civil employees)
- Annual budget: € 14.06 billion, 2026
- Minister responsible: Margarita Robles, Minister
- Agency executives: Amparo Valcarce, Secretary of State; Teodoro Esteban López Calderón, Chief of the Defence Staff; Juan Francisco Martínez Núñez, Secretary-General for Defence Policy; Adoración Mateos Tejada, Under-Secretary
- Website: www.defensa.gob.es

The Ministry of Defence (MINISDEF) is the department of the Government of Spain responsible for planning, developing and implementing the general guidelines of the Government about the defence policy and the managing of the military administration. It is the administrative and executive body of the Spanish Armed Forces.

According to the Constitution of 1978, the Monarch is the Commander in Chief of the Spanish military. He can declare war or conclude peace with authorization of the Cortes Generales, provided this act is countersigned by the Prime Minister.

The Ministry of Defence is headed by the Minister of Defence, a Cabinet member who depends directly from the Prime Minister. Beneath the Ministry of Defence are five subordinate principal departments: the Armed Forces, headed by the Chief of the Defence Staff (JEMAD), which is divided in three military branches led by the Chief of Staff of the Army (JEME), the Chief of Staff of the Navy (AJEMA) and the Chief of Staff of the Air Force (JEMA); the Secretariat of State for Defence (headed by the Secretary of State, SEDEF); the Undersecretariat of Defence headed by the Ministry's Under-Secretary (SUBDEF) and the General Secretariat for Defence Policy head by the Secretary-General (SEGENPOL). In addition, the National Intelligence Centre (CNI) is subordinated to the Ministry of Defence.

The current holder of the Ministry is Margarita Robles.

== History ==
=== Primitive military administration ===
Since the first origins of Spain, the monarchy has been the main form of government. That is the main reason why the first government departments appeared in the 18th century because for centuries, the monarch controlled all the power.

At the beginning, the King controlled the military through its Council of State which was divided in different sections dedicated to advise the King in the different areas of government.

=== Single and double secretariat ===
On July 11, 1705, King Philip V created a Secretariat for war and treasury matters, called Secretariat of the Dispatch of War and Treasury mainly because of the War of Succession. Once the war was over, in 1714 the Administration was reformed and two secretariats appeared: one dedicated to the Army called Secretariat of the Dispatch of War and another to the Navy called the Secretariat of the Dispatch of the Navy and Indies.

The Secretariat of the Dispatch of the Navy and Indies was suppressed in 1715 and the competences over the Navy were transferred to the Secretariat of War. In 1721 the Secretariat of the Dispatch of the Navy was re-created assuming the competences on the naval forces but on 30 January 1776, the Secretariat of the Dispatch of the Indies was recovered assuming the control of the overseas's naval forces. Since then, the Secretariat of the Navy had competences only on the naval forces of the Peninsular Spain, the Canaries and the Balearics because the Secretariat of the Dispatch of the Indies assumed the responsibilities on the naval forces in the rest of the Empire. It wasn't until 1790 that this Secretariat also assumed the competences on the Overseas Navy when the Indies Secretariat was suppressed. The same did the Secretariat of War with the competencies on the land forces in the Indies.

=== Ministries ===
This organization was maintained through decades and at the beginning of the 19th century, the terms Secretariat and Ministry were used as synonymous, until 1851 when the Ministry of War and Ministry of the Navy were officially renamed.

Since the Constitution of 1812, which creates the Secretary of State and of the Dispatch of the Overseas Government, until the creation of the Ministry of Overseas in 1863, there were constant hesitations in the allocation of powers over those domains and which advisory body to go in case of doubt in the resolution of the issues. In 1836 it is the Ministry of the Navy who assumes these functions; A few years later, they move to the Ministry of the Interior. In 1851 an Overseas Council and an Overseas Directorate were created under the Office of the Prime Minister.

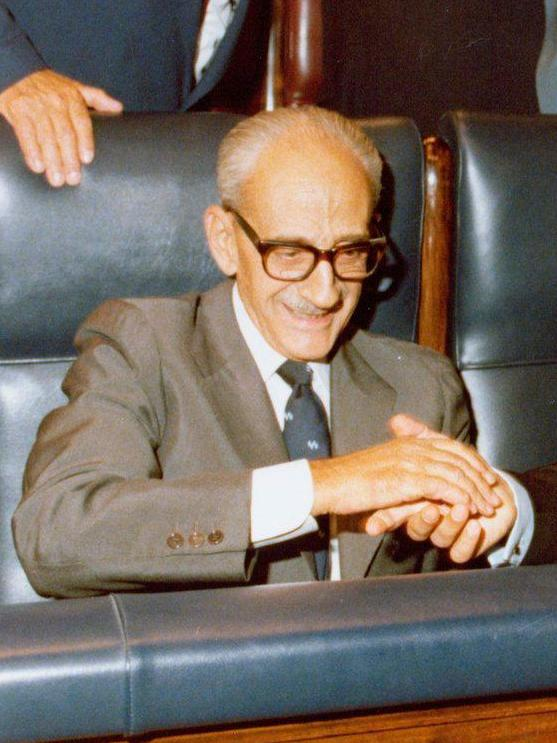
Manuel Gutiérrez Mellado, first Defence Minister of the democratic period.

The hesitations continue regarding the advisory body (the Overseas Council alternates with the Royal Council and the Advisory Board) the vacillations also occur in terms of the dependence of the Directorate that passes to the Ministry of State in 1854, it is added to the Development in 1856, to return to State a few months later and depends on the Ministry of War from 1858 until the creation of the Overseas Ministry by Royal Decree of 20 May 1863. It subsists until the loss of those imperial provinces and is definitively suppressed by Royal Decree of 15 April 1899.

=== First attempt and final unification ===
At the beginning of the 20th century, the Air Force started to make its firsts steps and at the very start they were just the air branch of the Army and later it was also created a Naval Air Force subordinated to the Navy.

During the Civil War, the armed forces split into two sides: the republican and the nationalist. In the republican side, there were two main ministries: the Ministry of War and the Ministry of the Navy and Aire Force; in the national side, there were only one unified ministry, the Ministry of National Defence that had all the competences over the three branches. After the Civil War, the Francoist regime divided again the former Ministry of National Defence intro three ministries: Ministry of the Army, Ministry of the Navy and the new Ministry of the Air Force (created in 1939).

This three military departments disappeared in 1977 when they merged into the current Ministry of Defence. This new Ministry of Defence established its headquarters in a building belonged to the Ministry of Culture and the three headquarters of the military ministries were destined to hold the main headquarters of each military branch. The position of Under Secretary of Defence was created in 1977. The new military organization was established in 1984 with the JEMAD as the Chief Operative of the Armed Forces and the Prime Minister (through the Defence Minister) as de facto leader of the Armed Forces. The Monarch remained as the symbolic commander-in-chief and the position of Secretary of State for Defence was created too.

In 2018, the National Intelligence Centre returned to the department's structure, and Paz Esteban López was appointed its first female director in 2020. On 2023, the administrative rank of the Center of Systems and Technologies of the Information and Communications was raised to directorate-general and, in September 2024, a new Directorate-General for Strategy and Innovation of the Defence Industry was created from some of the responsibilities of the Directorate-General for Armament and Materiel.

== Structure ==
Organizational chart of the Spanish Ministry of Defence, February 2024

The minister of defence, a member of the Council of Ministers, is the most senior official of the department and is appointed by the Monarch on the advice of the Prime Minister. The minister exercises direct command over the Armed Forces by delegation of the prime minister and in the name of the monarch and establishes the military policy.

The minister is assisted by the chiefs of staff on matters relating to the Armed Forces and their use, and by the secretary of state for defence, the secretary-general for defence policy and the Ministry's under-secretary on matters relating to military policy and administration.

As of 2026, this is the organization of the Ministry:

Ministry Organization (2026)
Minister	Cabinet
Minister	Office for Institutional Communication and Press
Minister	Technical Cabinet
Minister	National Intelligence Centre
Minister	Military Emergencies Unit
Armed Forces	Chief of the Defence Staff
Armed Forces	Chief of Staff of the Army
Armed Forces	Chief of Staff of the Navy
Armed Forces	Chief of Staff of the Air and Space Force
Secretary of State for Defence	Directorate-General for Strategy and Innovation of the Defence Industry
Secretary of State for Defence	Directorate-General for Armament and Materiel
Secretary of State for Defence	Directorate-General for Economic Affairs
Secretary of State for Defence	Directorate-General for Infrastructure
Secretary of State for Defence	Centre for Information and Communication Systems and Technologies
Secretary of State for Defence	National Institute for Aerospace Technology
Secretary of State for Defence	Institute for Housing, Infrastructure and Equipment of the Defence
Secretary-General for Defence Policy	Directorate-General for Defence Policy
Secretary-General for Defence Policy	Division for Security and Defence Studies and Coordination
Under-Secretary	Technical General Secretariat
Under-Secretary	Directorate-General for Personnel
Under-Secretary	Directorate-General for Military Recruitment and Education
Under-Secretary	Deputy Directorate-General for Administrative Affairs
Under-Secretary	Deputy Directorate-General for Financial Services and Pay Offices
Under-Secretary	Legal Department of the Defence
Under-Secretary	Office of the Comptroller General of the Defence
Under-Secretary	Inspectorate-General for Defence Health
Under-Secretary	Social Institute of the Armed Forces
Under-Secretary	Military Prison of Alcalá de Henares
Under-Secretary	Military Archbishopric of Spain

The Civil Guard and the Spanish Space Agency depends on the Ministry of Defence in the terms stipulated by laws.

=== Chain of Command ===
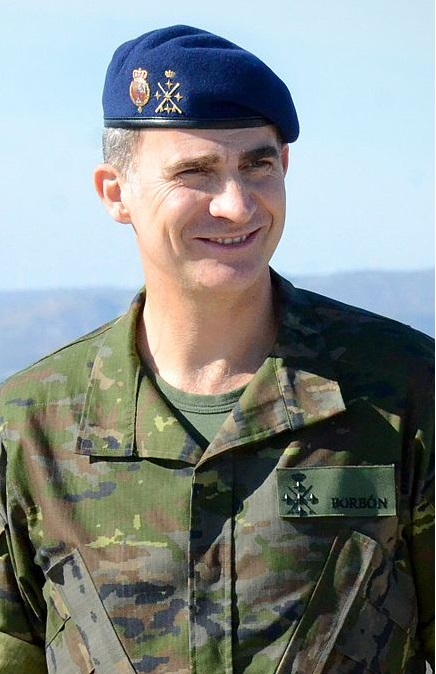
King Philip VI is the current Captain General of the Armed Forces.

The chain of command of the military is regulated in the 2005 National Defence Organic Act.

Like the Constitution, this organic law recognizes the Monarch as the supreme commander of the Armed Forces, with the rank of captain general. The Government is the body in charge of establishing the defence policy as well as control of the military administration. The Prime Minister is the civilian authority in command of the Armed Forces. The Minister of Defence, under the authority of the prime minister, control the Armed Forces and establish the military policy. The Chief of the Defence Staff (Spanish: Jefe del Estado Mayor de la Defensa, JEMAD) is the fourth military authority, in charge over the operative command of the Armed Forces. After the JEMAD are the chiefs of staff of the armies, who manage their respective branch and keep it organized and prepared.

The Parliament is the responsible for authorising the signing of military treaties, approving the defence laws and military budgets and authorize the Sovereign to declare war or to make peace. In particular, the Congress of Deputies is responsible for authorising the use of the Armed Forces abroad in missions that are not of national interest; if they are of national interest, the Government can use them without authorization but informing Congress.

Chain of command:

1. The Monarch
2. The Prime Minister
3. The Minister of Defence
4. The Chief of the Defence Staff
5. The chiefs of staff of the Army, the Navy and the Air and Space Force
6. The deputy chiefs of staff of the Army, the Navy and the Air and Space Force

Although they are important positions within the Military Administration, neither the Secretary of State for Defense, the Under-Secretary nor the Secretary-General for Defense Policy has military authority.

== Headquarters ==
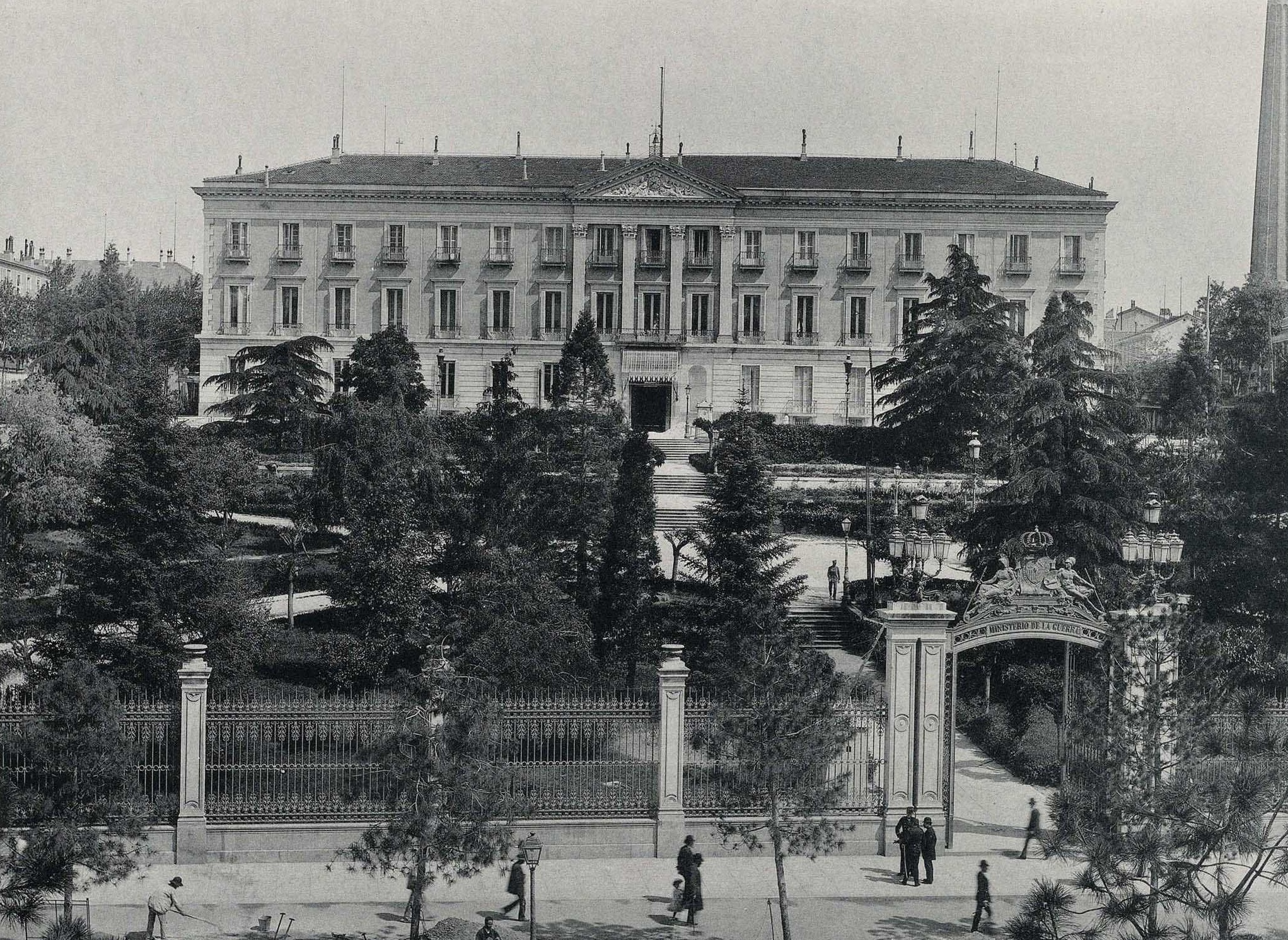
Buenavista Palace, headquarters of the Ministry of War since 1847 and of the Ministry of Defence from 1977 to 1981.

The first military departments —War and Navy— were headquartered at the royal residence, first in the Royal Alcázar from 1714 to 1734, briefly in the Royal Palace of Buen Retiro since 1734 and in the Royal Palace when its construction was finished. In 1826, due to the lack of space in the Royal Palace, they relocated to the Palace of Marqués de Grimaldi. However, a fire in 1846 forced all government departments to be relocated and only the Ministry of the Navy stayed in that Palace. The Ministry of War installed in the Buenavista Palace in 1847, a building that previously housed some military facilities.

In 1915, given the poor state of the Grimaldi Palace, a new headquarters for the Ministry of the Navy was built. With the creation of the Ministry of the Air in 1939, the same thing happened and by the 1950s the new Ministry already occupied its own palace in Moncloa Square.

Already during the democratic transition, in 1977 the new Ministry of Defence was created, being headquartered in the Palacio de Buenavista until 1981. That year, all central services were moved out to a large building located at number 109 Paseo de la Castellana (belonging to the Ministry of Culture and that previously had been the headquarters of the Ministry of Information and Tourism) in which it still remains today. As for the other three palaces, they continued to belong to the department but became the general headquarters of the Army branches.

== Budget ==
In millions of euros (€)
1. Modernization programs 5,361 (38.1%)
2. Operating expenses 3,334 (23.7%)
3. Administration and general services 2,537 (18.0%)
4. Training & reserve personnel 1,074 (7.64%)
5. Health & Social Security 1,016 (7.23%)
6. Intelligence services 334 (2.38%)
7. Research & studies 232 (1.65%)
8. Other expenditures 171 (1.22%)

For fiscal year 2026, the Ministry of Defence has a consolidated buget of €14.06 billion. From this, 12.43 billion are managed by the department's central services and 1,63 billion by its agencies.

Historically, the Ministry's final budget increases considerably due to the increase in budget appropriations throughout the year, a practice widely criticized by both Parliament and the Court of Auditors. The Government also uses the Ministry of Industry's budget to finance some defence programs.

The budget is composed of the following main areas:

1. Modernization programs (122A & 122B), which fund ordinary and special programs for the modernization and acquisition of military capabilities.
2. Administration and general services (121M & 931P), which covers the expenses of the Ministry’s central services, the Armed Forces, and their administrative structures, including internal auditing and accounting.
3. Operational expenses (122M & 122N), which finance the operational readiness of the Armed Forces—the Force and Force Support—that is, their deployment and training, as well as maintenance costs of military facilities.
4. Training and reserve personnel (121N & 12O), which includes the Ministry’s policies regarding personnel training and reserve personnel.
5. Healthcare and Social Protection (222M, 312A & 312E), which covers healthcare costs, social security, and other social benefits for personnel serving in the Ministry of Defence and the Armed Forces.
6. Intelligence services (912Q), which pays for the expenses of the National Intelligence Centre (CNI).
7. Research and studies (464A), which funds military R&D&I and studies.
8. Other expenses (12SC & 43KD), which finance other expenses related to digital skills for personnel and energy transition.

In addition, Programme 000X (“Internal Transfers and Disbursements”) is excluded from the analysis, as it consists of transfers between public sector entities and would otherwise lead to double counting and distort the overall budget.

=== Audit ===
The Ministry's accounts, as well as those of its agencies, are internally audited by the Office of the Comptroller General of the Defence (IGD), which functionally depends on the Office of the Comptroller General of the State (IGAE). Externally, the Court of Auditors is responsible for auditing expenditure.

Likewise, the Congress of Deputies and Senate Defence Committees exercise political control over the accounts, and the Congress of Deputies Official Secrets Committee supervises the National Intelligence Centre (CNI) activities and expenditure.

== Employees ==
According to the Military Statistical Yearbook of 2025, at the end of 2025 the Military Administration (Ministry of Defense and Armed Forces) was made up of 162,933 employees. Of these, 148,519 were military personnel and 14,414 were civilians. These figures do not include the 92,549 (Note: As of 31 December 2025, there are 82,387 active civil guards, 8,459 reserve civil guards and 1,703 in other administrative status.) Civil Guards who, in wartime, come under the unified command of the Ministry of Defence.

=== Military ===
Status	Army	Navy	Air and Space Force	Common Corps	Total
Active service	72,710	20,599	20,423	2,992	116,724
Other active status (Note: These may include: Special services, voluntary leave of absence, suspension of employment, suspension of duties and service in civil administration.)	3,303	655	1,252	321	5,531
Reserve (Note: This includes both career military personnel who are transferred to reserve status after reaching the legal limits, as well as voluntary and special availability reservists.)	15,762	4,195	5,278	1,029	26,264
Total	91,775	25,449	26,953	4,342	148,519

=== Civilian ===
Status	Career civil servants	Contract staff	Statutory (Note: Medical and non-medical personnel providing services in the field of military health care.)	Total
Active service	3,661	7,925	2,668	14,254
Other active status	68	53	39	160
Total	3,729	7,978	2,707	14,414

== See also ==
=== Related articles ===
- Gobierno Militar de Pontevedra

=== External links ===
- Official website
