= Emilio Alonso Manglano =

Spanish military officer

Emilio Alonso Manglano (Valencia, 13 April 1926 - Madrid, 8 July 2013) was a Spanish military officer who reached the rank of Lieutenant General. Of aristocratic origin and monarchist orientation, he headed the Spanish Intelligence Service, the Centro Superior de Información de la Defensa (CESID, later CNI), between 1981 and 1995. His main achievement was the transformation of the Francoist army into a democratic army. He also achieved the professionalisation of the intelligence services, allowing the entry of civilians and women, and the modernisation of the facilities with the creation of the Centre located in the A6, the headquarters of the CNI.

== Biography & Controversy ==
A son of Major General Luis Alonso de Orduña, he entered the General Military Academy on 24 July 1944, and was promoted in the following years. He graduated as number one of the 57th Army General Staff promotion. He participated in the Ifni War and was chief of staff of the Paratroopers Brigade. In 1981, following Tejero's failed coup d'état of 23 February, Alonso Manglano took command of the Alcalá de Henares Parachute Brigade to defend constitutional order and democracy.

On 22 May 1981, after the failed coup d'état, he was appointed director of the CESID with the rank of lieutenant colonel by Minister of Defense Alberto Oliart. Shortly afterwards, he thwarted a plot by the colonels to stage a coup on the eve of the October 1982 elections, which gave victory to the socialists.

This was the beginning of a fourteen-year period in which he managed to avoid regression and coups and to turn the army into a democratic institution. He is also credited with training a new generation of democratic agents and promoting the creation of a modern agency, comparable to its European and American counterparts. It is committed to transparency and is open to the outside world. Among the agency's achievements during Alonso Manglano's tenure were: the establishment of collaborative relations with the PLO on international terrorism, the re-establishment of relations with Israel, the choice of Madrid for the Peace Conference of 17 October 1997, and others that led to the recognition of Spain as a democratic nation with a prominent international role.

He resigned from his post on June 15, 1995 in response to the media scandal over illegal wiretapping by CESID, and was tried, initially convicted, and finally acquitted of the crime of illegal interception of telephone conversations at the headquarters of Herri Batasuna, reported in 1998.

He died of cancer on July 8, 2013, at the age of eighty-seven in Madrid.

On October 3, 2021, the newspaper ABC published the "Manglano Papers", a series of documents analyzed and researched by journalists Juan Fernández-Miranda and Javier Chicote, a seven-container archive containing hundreds of documents and agendas with information on Emilio Alonso Manglano and his period as director of Cesid between 1981 and 1995. The entire archive was revealed in the biography of Lieutenant General Manglano, titled "El jefe de los espías" (Roca, 2021).

=== Illegal wiretapping by the CESID ===
The case began with the dismissal of Colonel Juan Alberto Perote, head of CESID's Operational Unit, following the publication by the magazine Tiempo of some celebratory photographs taken after the fall of the Romanian dictator Nicolae Ceaucescu in December 1989. The ex-agent then took photocopied documents and microfiches from Cesid which were published by the newspaper El Mundo and used by the former banker Mario Conde to blackmail the government of Felipe González.

In 1984, General Manglano had set up an eavesdropping office which, with the help of a sensitive scanner, searched the radio spectrum and intercepted and recorded mobile phone conversations. The person in charge of intercepting, recording, listening to and destroying what was not relevant was Colonel Perote who, against orders, intercepted and kept recordings of conversations.

After Cesid and its head were implicated, General Manglano resigned in 1995 while legal proceedings continued. He was tried by the Madrid Provincial Court in May 1999; the trial was declared null and void by the Constitutional Court on the grounds of objective bias on the part of the judges who tried him. At the retrial in April 2005, he was acquitted, while the charges against Juan Alberto Perote were upheld.

== Personal and family life ==
He belonged to a conservative Valencian family of noble origin. He was the son of Luis Alonso de Orduña and Luisa Manglano Cucaló de Montull. He was the third of seven children, two boys and five girls. From a young age, according to his biographers Juan Fernández Miranda and Javier Chicote, he had a clear vocation to the priesthood. Wavering between the priesthood and a military career, he decided to follow in his father's footsteps and enter the General Military Academy in 1944. He had great support from his older brother Luis, Baron of Almiserat, who believed in Emilio's talent and ability to reach the highest levels of responsibility.

He had an affectionate relationship and courtship with the aristocrat and politician Carmen Díez de Rivera. Their marriage was thwarted by Emilio's reluctance to leave the army for a better paid job in the business world, as demanded by Carmen's father, the Marquis of Llanzol.

In 1974 he married the American Susan Lord, whom he met at a reception at the US embassy while studying journalism in Madrid. They had two children, Cristina and Santiago. Susan Lord was invaluable throughout his career as an interpreter and personal assistant. It was the children who made the personal archive of Emilio Alonso Manglano available to ABC journalists Fernández Miranda and Chicote.
