= Jorge Dezcallar de Mazarredo =

Spanish diplomat

Jorge Dezcallar Mazarredo
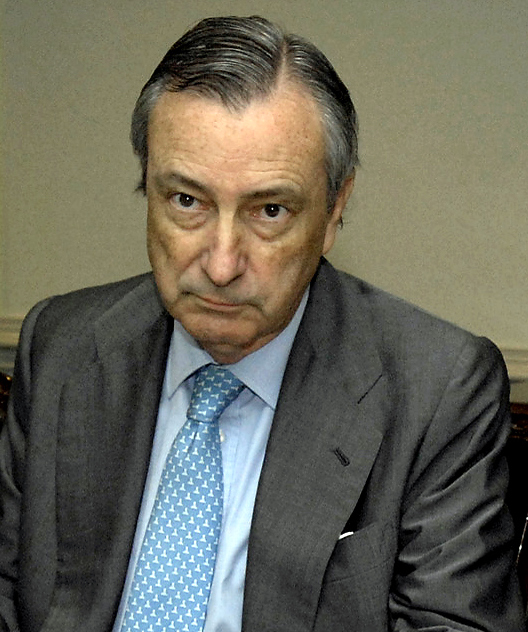
- Jorge Dezcallar pictured at the Pentagon
- Born: November 3, 1945 (age 80); Palma de Mallorca, Spain
- Known for: Spanish diplomat

Jorge Dezcallar Mazarredo (November 3, 1945) is a Spanish diplomat who served as Ambassador of Spain to the United States of America from 2008 to 2012.

Having studied law, he joined the diplomatic service in 1971. He first occupied the post of ambassador in Morocco which he held from 1997 until in 2001, when the government of José María Aznar appointed him director of the Center for Advanced Defense Information (Centro Superior de Información de la Defensa). After the 2004 general elections in June he was appointed as ambassador to the Vatican, a post which he held until 2006. He then had a short spell with Repsol as international advisor. In July 2008 the Council of Ministers appointed him ambassador to Washington and was replaced in January 2012 by Ramon Gil-Casares.

Today, his brother Rafael is the Spanish ambassador in Germany, and his other brother Alonso is the Spanish ambassador to Mauritania.

Jorge Dezcallar is a descendant of the noble family of the island of Mallorca.
