= Centro Superior de Información de la Defensa =

Former Spanish intelligence agency (1977–2002)

Superior Center of Defense Information
- Centro Superior de Información de la Defensa (CESID)

Agency overview
- Formed: July 14, 1977; 49 years ago
- Preceding agencies: Servicio Central de Documentación (SECED); Servicio de Información del Alto Estado Mayor (SIAEM)
- Dissolved: 6 May 2002
- Superseding agency: Centro Nacional de Inteligencia (CNI)
- Type: State intelligence agency
- Jurisdiction: Spain
- Agency executive: Jorge Dezcallar (last), Director

The Centro Superior de Información de la Defensa (English: Superior Center of Defense Information; CESID) was the Spanish intelligence agency before the current Centro Nacional de Inteligencia (CNI) took over as its successor in 2002.

== History ==
Following the dissolution of the Information Service and Military Police, Servicio de Información y Policía Militar (SIPM) at the end of the civil war, the intelligence organizations of the Francoist period were the Central Documentation Service, Servicio Central de Documentación (SECED).

But the most notable of all was the Segunda Bis which was the abbreviated name for the Servicios de Información del Ejército de Tierra, la Armada y el Ejército del Aire (Information Services of the Army, Navy and Air Force). It was the Second "Section", or Intelligence, of the respective Headquarters, hence the name "Segunda" or Second. During the 1940s, its main role was to counter the activities of the Spanish Maquis in their attempted resurgence in Spain who in October 1944, attempted an invasion of the Aran Valley. In 1957, its expenses amounted to 311,455₧ (€100,000).

The Centro Superior de Información de la Defensa was established in 1977 by Defense Minister Manuel Gutiérrez Mellado to replace the discredited former organizations in order to prepare Spain for a more democratic rule. On 2 November 1977 The Servicio de Información de la Presidencia del Gobierno (SIPG) was merged with the CESID.

By a royal decree of January 1984, CESID was defined legally as the intelligence agency of the prime minister. Nevertheless, it was fundamentally military in nature, and its head in 1988 was an army lieutenant general, Emilio Alonso Manglano. Observers speculated, however, that Manglano, who had held the post since 1981, eventually would be succeeded by a civilian.

Employing about 2,000 individuals as of 1988, CESID was staffed primarily by the military, supplemented by 500 members of the Civil Guard and by 80 plainclothes police. About 30 percent of the members of the staff were civilians, said to be selected usually from among close relatives of military officers. Women had been confined largely to administrative tasks, but they were increasingly being entrusted with operational assignments.

The principal operating units were domestic intelligence; foreign intelligence; counterintelligence; economics and technology (primarily industrial espionage); and operational support (principally application of devices for surveillance and eavesdropping). Considerable emphasis in external intelligence was allotted to North Africa and to the security of Ceuta and Melilla. Liaison was maintained with a number of intelligence services of North African and Middle Eastern nations, as well as with the Israeli agency, Mossad. Interception of ship transmissions in the strait area was another focus of activity. Domestic intelligence centered on exposure of plots against the government, monitoring activities of unrecognized political parties, and counterterrorism.

Although CESID was the senior agency, it did not have a firmly established coordinating function over other intelligence bodies, which included the General Headquarters of Information of the Ministry of Defense; the second sections of the army, the air force, and the navy staffs; and the Civil Guard Information Service (SIGC), dedicated to criminal and terrorist intelligence.

In addition, the National Police Corps had a General Commissariat of Information (CGI), with an antiterrorist mission that included a Foreign Intelligence Brigade to investigate international terrorism aimed against Spain. Considerable rivalry and overlapping of missions characterized the entire intelligence system. CESID, in particular, was reported to be seeking to gain exclusive jurisdiction over police foreign intelligence activities.

== Directors ==
- José Bourgon López-Dóriga (1977–1979)
- Gerardo Mariñas (1979–1981)
- Emilio Alonso Manglano (1981–1995)
- Félix Miranda (1995–1996)
- Javier Calderón (1996–2001)
- Jorge Dezcallar (2001–2002)

== See also ==
- Armed Police Corps
