= Military ranks of Spain =

The military ranks of Spain are the military insignia used by the Spanish Armed Forces.

== Army ==
=== Commissioned officer ranks ===
The rank insignia of commissioned officers.

NATO code	OF-10	OF-9	OF-8	OF-7	OF-6	OF-5	OF-4	OF-3	OF-2	OF-1
Spanish Army
Spanish Army	Capitán general	General de ejército	Teniente general	General de división	General de brigada	Coronel	Teniente coronel	Comandante	Capitán	Teniente	Alférez

==== Student officer ranks ====
Rank group	Alumno de 5º	Alumno de 4º	Alumno de 3º		Alumno de 2º	Alumno de 1º
Spanish Army
Spanish Army	Alférez alumno (5.º curso)	Alférez alumno (4.º curso)	Alférez alumno (3.er curso)	Cadete de 3.º (con asignaturas pendientes)	Cadete (2.º curso)	Cadete (1.er curso)

=== Other ranks ===
The rank insignia of non-commissioned officers and enlisted personnel.

NATO code	OR-9		OR-8	OR-7		OR-6	OR-5	OR-4	OR-3	OR-2	OR-1
Spanish Army
Spanish Army	Suboficial mayor	Subteniente	Brigada	Sargento primero	Sargento	Cabo mayor	Cabo primero	Cabo	Soldado (larga duración)	Soldado (inicial)

=== Non commissioned officers and Enlisted Student rank insignia ===
NATO Code	Non Commissioned Officers Student			Enlisted Student
Spain
Spain	Sargento Alumno (3.º curso)	Caballero/Dama; Alumno de 2.º (2.º curso)	Caballero/Dama; Alumno de 1.º (1.º curso)	Aspirante MPTM

=== Historic ranks ===
NATO code	OR-9		OR-8	OR-7	OR-6	OR-5	OR-4	OR-3	OR-2	OR-1
Spanish Army (–2025)
Spanish Army (–2025)	Suboficial mayor	Subteniente	Brigada	Sargento primero	Sargento	Cabo mayor	Cabo primero	Cabo	Soldado de primera	Soldado

== Navy ==
=== Commissioned officer ranks ===
The rank insignia of commissioned officers.

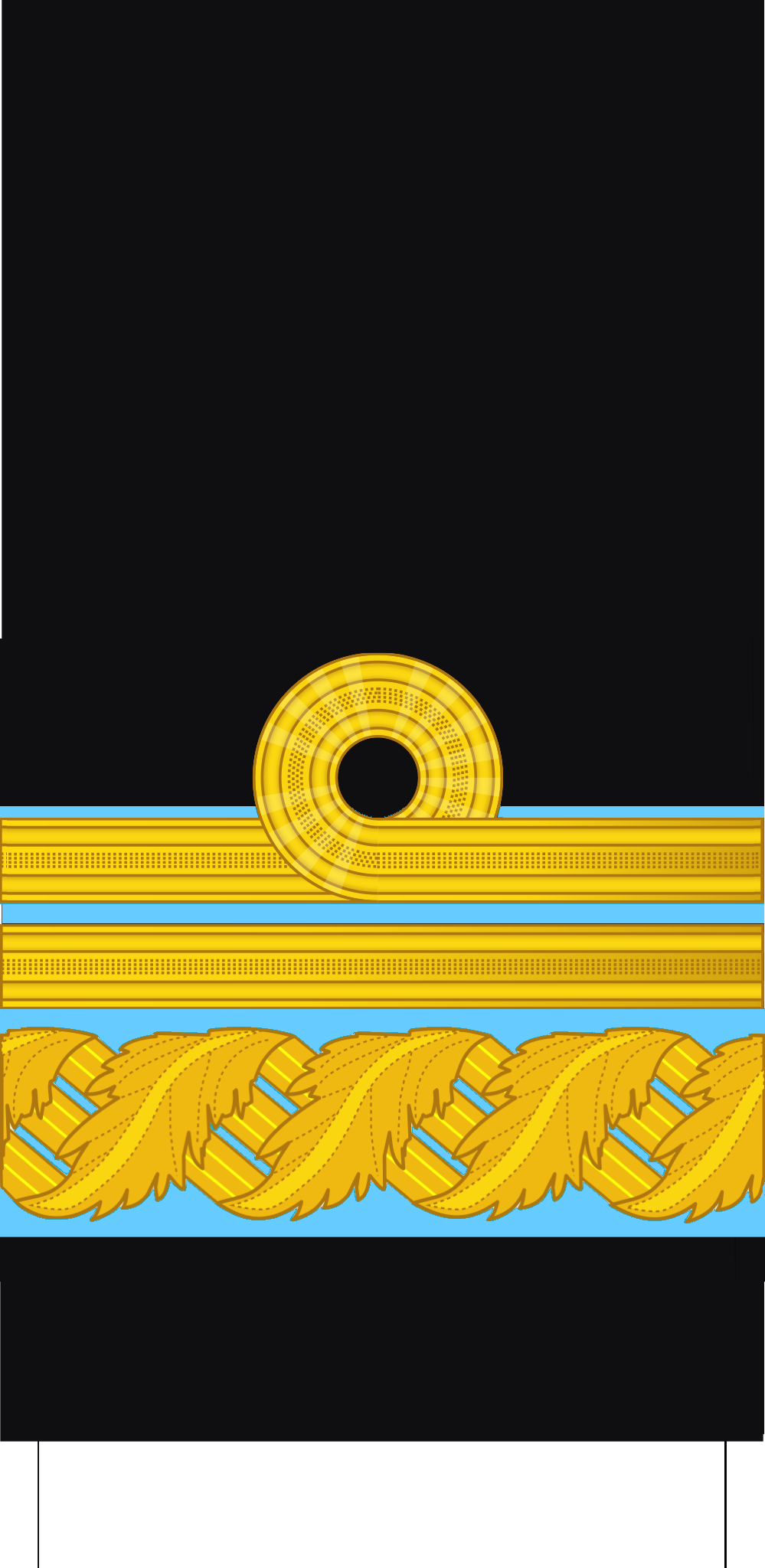
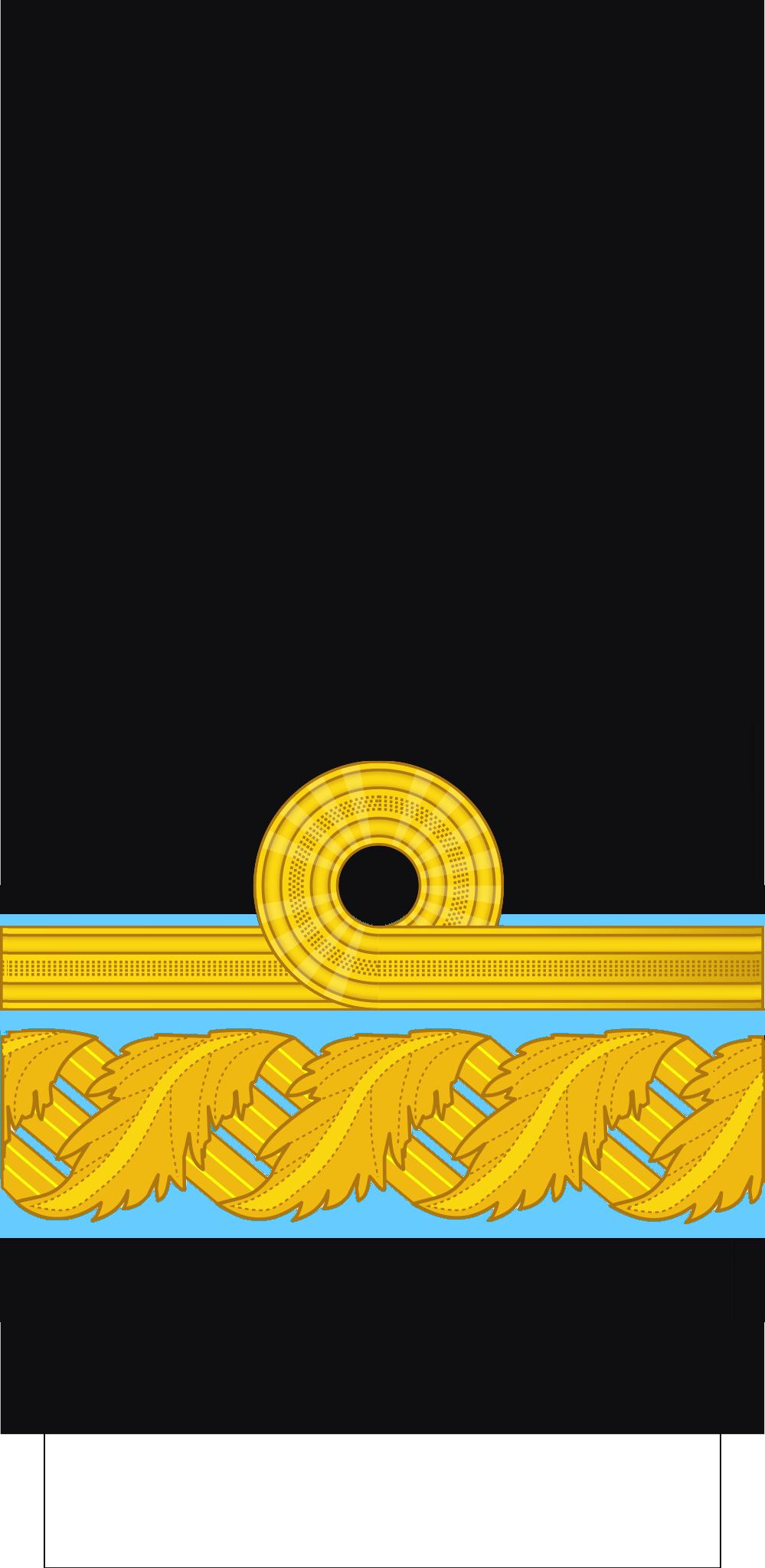
NATO code	OF-10	OF-9	OF-8	OF-7	OF-6	OF-5	OF-4	OF-3	OF-2	OF-1
Spanish Navy
Spanish Navy	Capitán general	Almirante general	Almirante	Vicealmirante	Contralmirante	Capitán de navío	Capitán de fragata	Capitán de corbeta	Teniente de navío	Alférez de navío	Alférez de fragata
Spanish Marine Infantry
Spanish Marine Infantry			Teniente general	General de división	General de brigada	Coronel	Teniente coronel	Comandante	Capitán	Teniente	Alférez
Naval Corps of Engineers
Naval Corps of Engineers				Vicealmirante	Contralmirante	Capitán de navío	Capitán de fragata	Capitán de corbeta	Teniente de navío	Alférez de navío	Alférez de fragata
Naval Intendance Corps
Naval Intendance Corps				General de división	General de brigada	Coronel	Teniente coronel	Comandante	Capitán	Teniente	Alférez
NATO code	OF-10	OF-9	OF-8	OF-7	OF-6	OF-5	OF-4	OF-3	OF-2	OF-1

==== Student officer ranks ====
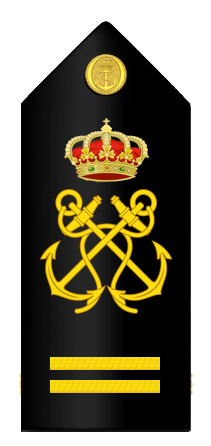
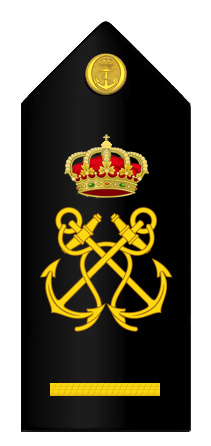
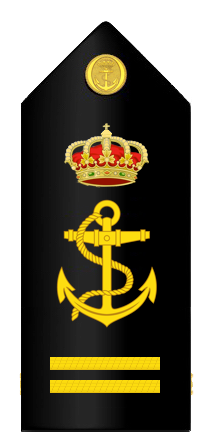
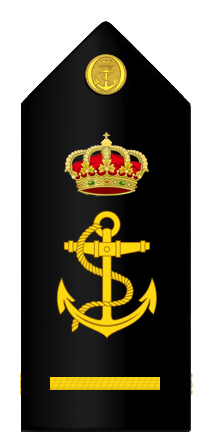
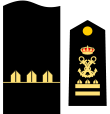
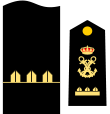
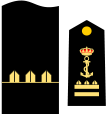
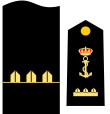
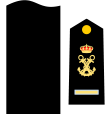
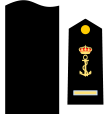
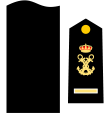
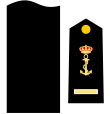
Rank group	Alumno de 5º	Alumno de 4º	Alumno de 3º	Alumno de 2º	Alumno de 1º
Spanish Navy
Spanish Navy		Guardiamarina de 2º	Guardiamarina de 1º	Aspirante de 2º	Aspirante de 1º
Spanish Marine Infantry
Spanish Marine Infantry		Guardiamarina de 2º	Guardiamarina de 1º	Aspirante de 2º	Aspirante de 1º
Naval Corps of Engineers
Naval Corps of Engineers	Alférez de fragata		Guardiamarina de 1º		Aspirante de 1º
Naval Intendance Corps
Naval Intendance Corps	Alférez		Guardiamarina de 1º		Aspirante de 1º

=== Other ranks ===
The rank insignia of non-commissioned officers and enlisted personnel.

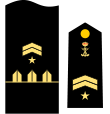
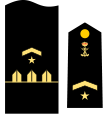
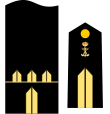
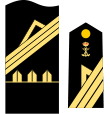
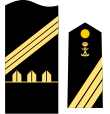
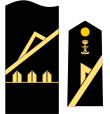
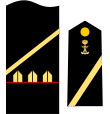
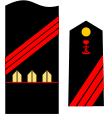
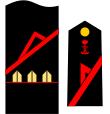
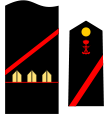
NATO code	OR-9		OR-8	OR-7	OR-6	OR-5	OR-4	OR-3	OR-2	OR-1
Spanish Navy
Spanish Navy	Suboficial mayor	Subteniente	Brigada	Sargento primero	Sargento	Cabo mayor	Cabo primero	Cabo	Marinero de primera	Marinero
Spanish Marine Infantry
Spanish Marine Infantry	Suboficial mayor	Subteniente	Brigada	Sargento primero	Sargento	Cabo mayor	Cabo primero	Cabo	Soldado de primera	Soldado

=== Officer Cadets and NCO Candidates ===
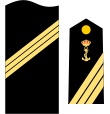
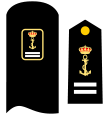
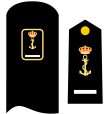
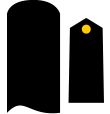
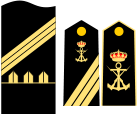
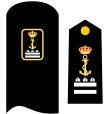
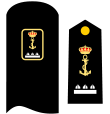
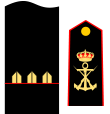
NATO Code	NCO Candidates			Enlisted Student
(Spain) Navy
(Spain) Marines
	Sargento Alumno 3º año	Alumno 2º año	Alumno 1º año	Aspirante MPTM
Equivalent; Translation	Sergeant Student; 3rd year	Student; 2nd Course	Student; 1st Course	MPTM Student

== Air and Space Force ==
=== Commissioned officer ranks ===
The rank insignia of commissioned officers.

NATO code	OF-10	OF-9	OF-8	OF-7	OF-6	OF-5	OF-4	OF-3	OF-2	OF-1
Spanish Air and Space Force
Spanish Air and Space Force	Capitán general	General del Aire	Teniente general	General de división	General de brigada	Coronel	Teniente coronel	Comandante	Capitán	Teniente	Alférez

==== Student officer ranks ====
Rank group	Alumno de 5º	Alumno de 4º	Alumno de 3º		Alumno de 2º	Alumno de 1º
Spanish Air and Space Force
Spanish Air and Space Force	Alférez alumno de 5.º	Alférez alumno de 4.º	Alférez alumno de 3.º	Cadete de 3.º (con asignaturas pendientes)	Cadete de 2.º	Cadete de 1.º

=== Other ranks ===
The rank insignia of non-commissioned officers and enlisted personnel.

NATO code	OR-9		OR-8	OR-7	OR-6	OR-5	OR-4	OR-3	OR-2	OR-1
Spanish Air and Space Force
Spanish Air and Space Force	Suboficial mayor	Subteniente	Brigada	Sargento primero	Sargento	Cabo mayor	Cabo primero	Cabo	Soldado de primera	Soldado

=== Non commissioned officers and Enlisted Student rank insignia ===
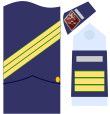
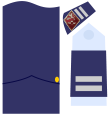
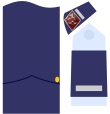
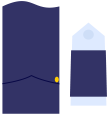
NATO Code	Non Commissioned Officers Student			Enlisted Student
Spain
Spain	Sargento Alumno (3.º año)	Alumno de 2.º (2.º año)	Alumno de 1.º (1.º año)	Aspirante MPTM

== Guardia Civil ==
=== Commissioned officer ranks ===
The rank insignia of commissioned officers.

NATO code	OF-10	OF-9	OF-8	OF-7	OF-6	OF-5	OF-4	OF-3	OF-2	OF-1
(Spain) Spanish Civil Guard
(Spain) Spanish Civil Guard			Teniente general	General de división	General de brigada	Coronel	Teniente coronel	Comandante	Capitán	Teniente	Alférez

==== Student officer ranks ====
Rank group	Alumno de 5º	Alumno de 4º	Alumno de 3º		Alumno de 2º	Alumno de 1º
(Spain) Spanish Civil Guard
(Spain) Spanish Civil Guard	Caballero alférez cadete (5.º curso)	Caballero alférez cadete (4.º curso)	Caballero alférez cadete (3.º curso)	Alférez alumno de 3.º (con asignaturas pendientes)	Alférez alumno (2.º curso)	Alférez alumno (1.er curso)

=== Other ranks ===
The rank insignia of non-commissioned officers and enlisted personnel.

NATO code	OR-9		OR-8	OR-7	OR-6	OR-5	OR-4	OR-3	OR-2	OR-1
(Spain) Spanish Civil Guard
(Spain) Spanish Civil Guard	Suboficial mayor	Subteniente	Brigada	Sargento primero	Sargento	Cabo mayor	Cabo primero	Cabo	Guardia Civil de Primera (Note: Rank in abeyance)	Guardia Civil

=== Non commissioned officers and Enlisted Student rank insignia ===
NATO Code	Non Commissioned Officers Student	Enlisted Student
Spanish Civil Guard
Spanish Civil Guard	Sargento Alumno	Guardia Alumno
Spanish Civil Guard	Sergeant Student	Guard Student

== Common Corps ==
=== Commissioned officer ranks ===
The rank insignia of commissioned officers.

NATO code	OF-10	OF-9	OF-8	OF-7	OF-6	OF-5	OF-4	OF-3	OF-2	OF-1
Spanish Military Legal Corps
Spanish Military Legal Corps				General consejero togado	General auditor	Coronel auditor	Teniente coronel auditor	Comandante auditor	Capitán auditor	Teniente auditor
Spanish Military Health Corps
Spanish Military Health Corps				General de división	General de brigada	Coronel	Teniente coronel	Comandante	Capitán	Teniente

== Spanish Royal Guard ==
=== Commissioned officer ranks ===
The rank insignia of commissioned officers.

NATO code	OF-10	OF-9	OF-8	OF-7	OF-6	OF-5	OF-4	OF-3	OF-2	OF-1
Spanish Royal Guard
Spanish Royal Guard						Coronel	Teniente coronel	Comandante	Capitán	Teniente	Alférez

=== Other ranks ===
The rank insignia of non-commissioned officers and enlisted personnel.

NATO code	OR-9		OR-8	OR-7	OR-6	OR-5	OR-4	OR-3	OR-2	OR-1
Spanish Royal Guard
Spanish Royal Guard	Suboficial mayor	Subteniente	Brigada	Sargento primero	Sargento	Cabo mayor	Cabo primero	Cabo	Soldado de primera	Soldado

== Military Emergencies Unit ==
=== Commissioned officer ranks ===
The rank insignia of commissioned officers.

NATO code	OF-10	OF-9	OF-8	OF-7	OF-6	OF-5	OF-4	OF-3	OF-2	OF-1
Military Emergencies Unit
Military Emergencies Unit				General de división	General de brigada	Coronel	Teniente coronel	Comandante	Capitán	Teniente	Alférez

=== Other ranks ===
The rank insignia of non-commissioned officers and enlisted personnel.

NATO code	OR-9		OR-8	OR-7	OR-6	OR-5	OR-4	OR-3	OR-2	OR-1
(Spain) Military Emergencies Unit
(Spain) Military Emergencies Unit	Suboficial mayor	Subteniente	Brigada	Sargento primero	Sargento	Cabo mayor	Cabo primero	Cabo	Soldado de primera	Soldado

== Military Archbishopric of Spain ==
Regular Chaplain with status as Colonel	Regular Chaplain with status as Lieutenant colonel	Regular Chaplain with status as Major	Temporary Chaplain with status as Captain

== See also ==
- Ranks of the Spanish Republican Army
- Ranks of the Spanish Republican Navy
- Ranks of the Spanish Republican Air Force
- Military ranks of the Second Spanish Republic
