= Carlos Villar =

Carlos Villar may refer to:

- Carlos Villarías or Carlos Villar, Spanish actor
- Carlos Villar (footballer), Portuguese naval officer and a pioneer of football in Portugal
- Carlos Villar Turrau, Spanish general
- Carlos Villar, a character in the 2012 film Safe House
