= Carlos Vilar (disambiguation) =

Carlos Vilar (1930–2021), was an Argentine Snipe sailor.

Carlos Vilar may also refer to:

- Carlos Alcántara Vilar (born 1964), Peruvian stand-up comedian and actor
- Carlos Vilar, architect on HSBC Bank Argentina

== See also ==
- Carlos Villar Turrau, Spanish general
- Carlos Villar, character in Safe House (2012 film)
