= General of the Army (Spain) =

Highest General officer rank in the Spanish Army

General of the Army General de Ejército
- Insignia of Spanish General of the Army.

- Uniform shoulder strap of a General of the Army.
- Country: Spain
- Service branch: Spanish Army
- Abbreviation: GA
- Rank: Four-star
- NATO rank code: OF-9
- Formation: 19 May 1999
- Next higher rank: Captain general of the Army
- Next lower rank: Lieutenant general
- Equivalent ranks: General of the Air (Air and Space Force); Admiral General (Navy)

General of the Army (Spanish: General de Ejército), also called Army General, is a four-star general officer and the second highest possible rank in the Spanish Army. A General of the Army ranks immediately above a Lieutenant general and is equivalent to an Admiral General and a General of the Air. There is no equivalent in the Civil Guard or in the Spanish Navy Marines; in both cases the top rank is Lieutenant General.

The rank was created in 1999 to adapt the Spanish military ranks to the ranks of NATO This is the highest rank that a military officer can reach, because the next higher is Captain General and that rank is only reserved to the Spanish monarch as commander-in-chief of the Armed Forces (even that sometimes has been given as an honorary rank to some generals).

The General of the Army insignia consist of a baton crossed over a sabre under a Royal Crown and a star in every angle that form the crossed baton and the sabre. Being under a Crown means that the rank is part of the generalship (the group of generals of the Armed Forces), the baton and the sabre means command and the four stars means the rank of General. This insignia was used before 1999 by the Sovereign as Captain General.

== Promotion ==
The promotion to General of the Army is reserved to two positions. These are, the Chief of the Defence Staff and the Chief of Staff of the Army.

Both positions are appointed by the Monarch at the government's proposal. The first is directly nominated by the Prime Minister and the second is nominated by the Minister of Defence. Being appointed Chief of the Defence Staff means the automatically promotion to the rank of General of the Army. The same happens with the Chief of Staff of the Army with the exception if the official appointed has the rank of divisional general, in that case, the official needs to be promoted first to lieutenant general.

== Living Generals of the Army ==
As of January 2026, there are 9 Generals of the Army alive, these are:

Promoted	Name	Other
17 January 2003	Luis Alejandre Sintes	Chief of Staff of the Army (2003-2004)
25 June 2004	José Antonio García González	Chief of Staff of the Army (2004-2006)
25 June 2004	Félix Sanz Roldán	Director-General of Defense Policy (14 May-26 June 2004); Chief of the Defence Staff (2004-2008); Director of the National Intelligence Center (2009-2019)
28 April 2006	Carlos Villar Turrau	Chief of Staff of the Army (2006-2008)
18 July 2008	Fulgencio Coll Bucher	Chief of Staff of the Army (2008-2012)
27 July 2012	Jaime Domínguez Buj	Chief of Staff of the Army (2012-2017)
24 March 2017	Fernando Alejandre Martínez	Chief of the Defence Staff (2017–2020)
31 March 2017	Francisco Javier Varela Salas	Chief of Staff of the Army (2017–2021)
5 October 2021	Amador Fernando Enseñat y Berea	Chief of Staff of the Army (2021–present)

The most recent Army General to die was Ramón Porgueres Hernández on 18 December 2018, who served as Chief of Staff of the Army from 1990 to 1994. Under his command, the Armed Forces were deployed abroad for the first time since the restoration of democracy.
