= Santayana (surname) =

Santayana is a Spanish surname. Notable people with the surname include:

- Alfonso Pardo de Santayana y Coloma (1936–2015), Spanish military officer
- Antonio Gutiérrez de Otero y Santayana (1729–1799), Spanish lieutenant general
- George Santayana (1863–1952), Spanish-American philosopher
