= Chief of Staff of the Army (Spain) =

- Jefe de Estado Mayor del Ejército de Tierra
- Coat of Arms of the Office of the JEME

- Flag of the Chief of Staff of the Army

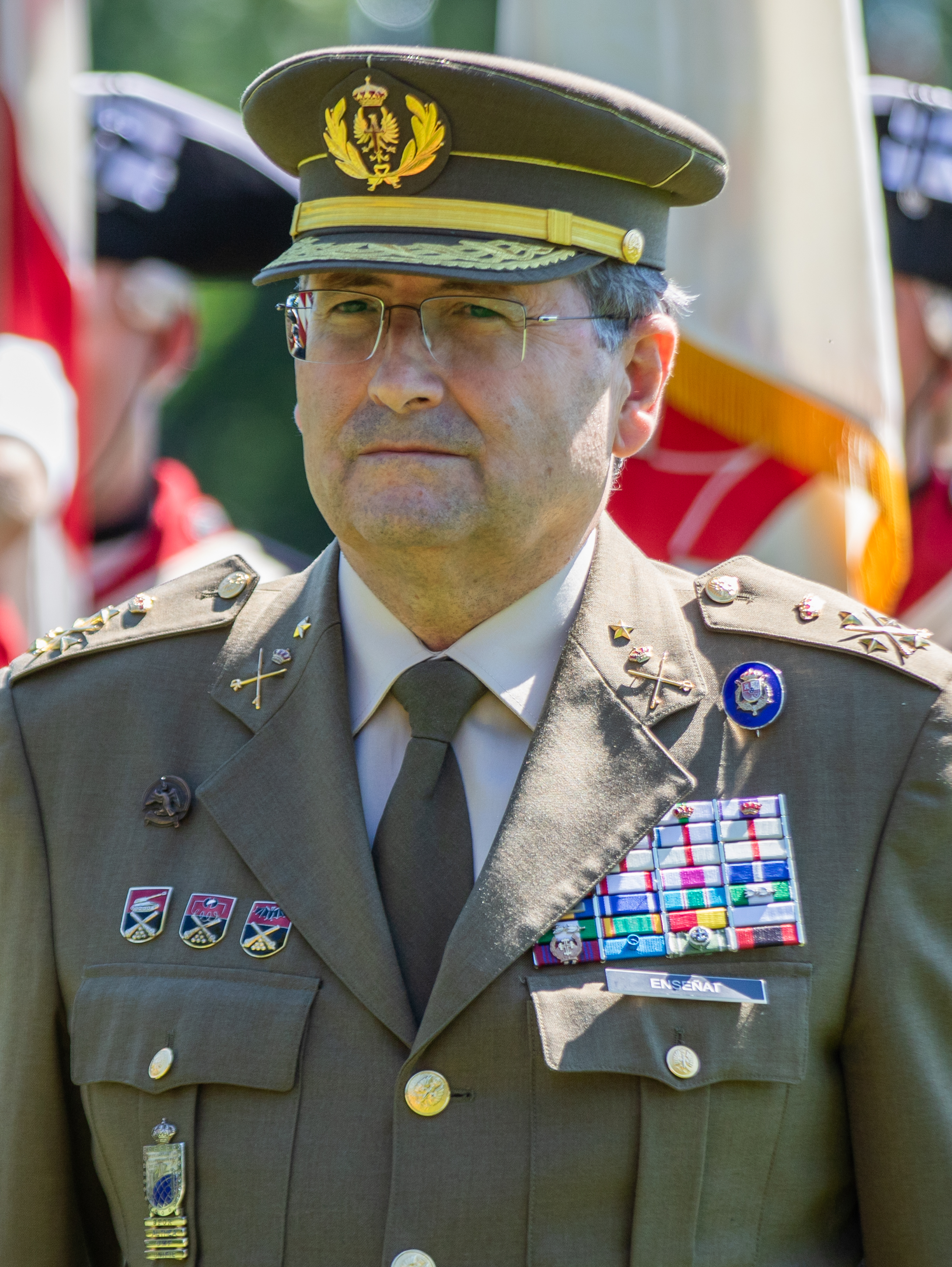
- Incumbent; General of the Army; Amador Fernando Enseñat y Berea since 6 October 2021
- Army Staff; Ministry of Defence
- Style: The Most Excellent
- Status: Highest-ranking officer in the Army
- Abbreviation: JEME
- Member of: Army Staff; National Defence Council; Council of Chiefs of Staff
- Reports to: Minister of Defence
- Seat: Buenavista Palace, Army Headquarters, Madrid
- Nominator: Defence Minister; After being discussed in the Council of Ministers
- Appointer: Monarch; Countersigned by the Defence Minister
- Term length: No fixed term
- Constituting instrument: Law of 17 July 1904
- Formation: 13 December 1904; 121 years ago
- First holder: Camilo García de Polavieja
- Deputy: Second Chief of Staff of the Army
- Website: (in Spanish) Website of the Spanish Army Staff

The Chief of Staff of the Army (JEME) is a military office held by a four-star general in the Spanish Army. Because of this, the JEME is the principal advisor to the Chief of the Defence Staff (JEMAD) on ground warfare and it is also an advisor to the Minister of Defence, the Secretary of State for Defence (SEDEF) and the Under-Secretary of Defence (SUBDEF).

Under the authority of the defence minister, the Chief of Staff of the Army exercises command over the land branch of the Armed Forces.

The JEME has two main roles: the support role by which advice is provided to the Minister of Defence about land military policy, the JEMAD about how to use the personnel and their operative status, the SEDEF about the economic, armament and infrastructure policies and the Under Secretary about the personnel and teaching policy, and the operative role to prepare the force for combat, instruct military personnel, establishes the organization of its military branch and watches over the welfare of the personnel under his command and evaluates the needs of the Army.

The Chief of the Staff of the Army convenes the meetings and coordinates the efforts of the Army Staff (EME), the main support body to the JEME responsible for providing the necessary elements of judgment to base its decisions, translate these into orders and ensure their fulfillment. The EME has a whole body of military officers at its service, and among the main officers include the Second Chief of Staff of the Army, the General Chief of the Terrestrial Headquarters of High Availability, the Chief of the Land Force and the General Chief of the Command of Personnel of the Army, among others.

The position was previously held by army general Francisco Javier Varela Salas and as of September 2026 was held by General Amador Fernando Enseñat y Berea.

== History ==
The creation of an Army Staff (Estado Mayor Central del Ejército) (EMCE) was planned on the Law of 17 July 1904 by which the Ministry of War was authorized to modify its structure. On 13 December 1904, the Minister of War approved a Regulation developing that structure and creating the Army Staff and in front of it a chief of staff. The JEME needed to be a lieutenant general and at the same time was created the office of the Second Chief of Staff of the Army with the rank of divisional general. On 30 May 1907, the National Defence Board and the JEME was part of it.

The EMCE was suppressed on 29 December 1912 and it was replaced by a section called Section of Army Staff and Campaign and the powers of the JEME were assumed by the Under Secretary of War.

The need to recover the Army Staff did not take long to appear and in November 1915 the Council of Ministers approved the draft bill of the Army Staff that was approved by the Cortes Generales and on 26 January 1916 the EMCE was re-created with mere technical functions, because it had no executive functions and was only granted such in times of war.

In this new law the position was reserved to captain general or lieutenant general officers and in times of war it was granted to the JEME total command of the Army unless the King put himself in charge of it. The JEME was indistinctly titled Chief of the Army Staff or General Chief of the Army Staff.

In 1925, the EMCE was once again suppressed and the functions of the JEME were assumed directly by the Minister of War, and the Directorate-General of Campaign Preparation, which served as the Army Staff, was created. It was recovered by the provisional government of the second republic in July 1931.

During the Civil War, as with the rest of the military branches, each side created its own General Staff. With the end of the civil war, the Francoist government maintained the structure of the Army Staff that existed previously, and did not change until the arrival of democracy, which changed the name of Chief of the Central Staff of the Army to Chief of Staff of the Army in 1977.

== List of officeholders ==
No.	Portrait	Chief of Staff	Took office	Left office	Time in office	Ref.
1	Camilo García de Polavieja	Lieutenant general Camilo García de Polavieja (1838–1914)	25 December 1904	19 March 1906	1 year, 84 days	
2	Vicente Martitegui [es]	Lieutenant general Vicente Martitegui (1843–1912)	23 March 1906	8 November 1908	2 years, 230 days	
3	Diego de los Ríos	Lieutenant general Diego de los Ríos (1850–1911)	8 March 1909	14 January 1910	312 days	
4	Julián González Parrado	Lieutenant general Julián González Parrado	14 January 1910	27 December 1912	2 years, 348 days	
Office suppressed between 1912 and 1916
5	Valeriano Weyler	Captain general of the Army; Valeriano Weyler (1838–1930)	14 January 1916	5 January 1922	5 years, 356 days	
6	Luis Aizpuru y Mondéjar [es]	Lieutenant general Luis Aizpuru y Mondéjar (1857–1939)	7 January 1922	27 May 1923	1 year, 140 days	
7	Valeriano Weyler	Captain general of the Army; Valeriano Weyler (1838–1930)	28 July 1923	6 October 1925	2 years, 70 days	
Office suppressed between 1925 and 1931
8	Manuel Goded Llopis	Divisional general Manuel Goded Llopis (1882–1936)	31 July 1931	30 June 1932	335 days	
9	Carlos Masquelet	Divisional general Carlos Masquelet (1871–1948)	17 February 1933	4 April 1935	2 years, 46 days	
10	Francisco Franco	Divisional general Francisco Franco (1892–1975)	19 May 1935	23 February 1936	280 days	
11	José Sánchez-Ocaña Beltrán [es]	Divisional general José Sánchez-Ocaña Beltrán (1874–1964)	23 February 1936	19 July 1936	147 days	
Civil War
Republican zone
12	Toribio Martínez Cabrera	Divisional general Toribio Martínez Cabrera (1874–1939) (Disputed)	19 July 1936	20 May 1937	305 days	
14	Vicente Rojo Lluch	Divisional general Vicente Rojo Lluch (1894–1966) (Disputed)	20 May 1937	9 February 1939	1 year, 265 days	
Nationalist zone
13	Fidel Dávila Arrondo	Brigadier; Fidel Dávila Arrondo (1878–1962) (Disputed)	2 October 1936	30 September 1939	2 years, 363 days	
End of the Civil War
15	Carlos Martínez de Campos y Serrano	Artillery Colonel; Carlos Martínez de Campos y Serrano (1887–1975)	30 September 1939	12 May 1941	1 year, 224 days	
16	Carlos Asensio Cabanillas	Brigadier general Carlos Asensio Cabanillas (1896–1969)	12 May 1941	4 September 1942	1 year, 115 days	
17	Rafael García Valiño	Divisional general Rafael García Valiño (1898–1972)	4 September 1942	24 March 1950	7 years, 201 days	
18	Fernando Barrón	Lieutenant general Fernando Barrón (1892–1952)	24 March 1950	9 November 1952	2 years, 230 days	
19	Emilio Esteban Infantes	Lieutenant general Emilio Esteban Infantes (1892–1962)	9 November 1952	5 October 1955	2 years, 330 days	
20	Antonio Alcubilla Pérez [ca]	Lieutenant general Antonio Alcubilla Pérez (1896–?)	5 October 1955	27 April 1959	3 years, 204 days	
21	José Cuesta Monereo	Lieutenant general José Cuesta Monereo (1895–1981)	27 April 1959	30 December 1961	2 years, 247 days	
22	Valero Valderrábanos Samitier	Lieutenant general Valero Valderrábanos Samitier	30 December 1961	16 November 1962	321 days	
23	Ramón Gotarredona Prats [es]	Lieutenant general Ramón Gotarredona Prats (1898–1968)	16 November 1962	25 October 1963	343 days	
24	Rafael Cavanillas Prosper [es]	Lieutenant general Rafael Cavanillas Prosper (1899–1998)	25 October 1963	13 July 1965	1 year, 261 days	
25	César Mantilla Lautrec [es]	Lieutenant general César Mantilla Lautrec (1902–1973)	6 August 1965	18 June 1968	2 years, 317 days	
26	Fernando González-Camino y Aguirre [es]	Lieutenant general Fernando González-Camino y Aguirre (1905–1973)	18 June 1968	2 July 1971	3 years, 14 days	
27	Gonzalo Fernández de Córdoba y Ziburu [es]	Lieutenant general Gonzalo Fernández de Córdoba y Ziburu (1907–1983)	2 July 1971	12 November 1973	2 years, 133 days	
28	Emilio Villaescusa Quilis [es]	Lieutenant general Emilio Villaescusa Quilis (1912–2002)	12 November 1973	1 July 1976	2 years, 232 days	
29	Manuel Gutiérrez Mellado	Lieutenant general Manuel Gutiérrez Mellado (1912–1995)	1 July 1976	26 October 1976	117 days	
30	Ramón Cuadra Medina [es]	Lieutenant general Ramón Cuadra Medina	3 November 1976	13 January 1977	71 days	
31	José Miguel Vega Rodríguez	Lieutenant general José Miguel Vega Rodríguez (1913–1999) (Note: Promoted posthumously to General of the Army in 1999.)	13 January 1977	24 May 1978	1 year, 131 days	
32	Tomás de Liniers y Pidal	Lieutenant general Tomás de Liniers y Pidal	24 May 1978	18 May 1979	359 days	
33	José Gabeiras [es]	Lieutenant general José Gabeiras (1916–2005) (Note: Promoted to General of the Army ad honorem in 1999.)	18 May 1979	15 January 1982	2 years, 242 days	
34	Ramón Ascanio y Togores	Lieutenant general Ramón Ascanio y Togores	15 January 1982	11 January 1984	1 year, 361 days	
35	José Sáenz de Tejada y Fernández de Bobadilla	Lieutenant general José Sáenz de Tejada y Fernández de Bobadilla	11 January 1984	31 October 1986	2 years, 293 days	
36	Miguel Íñiguez del Moral	Lieutenant general Miguel Íñiguez del Moral	31 October 1986	18 May 1990	3 years, 199 days	
37	Ramón Porgueres Hernández [es]	Lieutenant general Ramón Porgueres Hernández (1928–2018)	18 May 1990	14 February 1994	3 years, 272 days	
38	José Faura Martín	Lieutenant general José Faura Martín	14 February 1994	1 October 1998	4 years, 229 days	
39	Alfonso Pardo de Santayana y Coloma	General of the Army; Alfonso Pardo de Santayana y Coloma (1936–2015)	1 October 1998	17 January 2003	4 years, 108 days	
40	Luis Alejandre Sintes [es]	General of the Army; Luis Alejandre Sintes (born 1941)	17 January 2003	25 June 2004	1 year, 160 days	
41	José Antonio García González [es]	General of the Army; José Antonio García González (born 1943)	25 June 2004	28 April 2006	1 year, 307 days	
42	Carlos Villar Turrau	General of the Army; Carlos Villar Turrau (born 1945)	28 April 2006	18 July 2008	2 years, 81 days	
43	Fulgencio Coll Bucher	General of the Army; Fulgencio Coll Bucher (born 1948)	18 July 2008	27 July 2012	4 years, 9 days	
44	Jaime Domínguez Buj	General of the Army; Jaime Domínguez Buj (born 1952)	27 July 2012	1 April 2017	4 years, 248 days	
45	Francisco Javier Varela Salas	General of the Army; Francisco Javier Varela Salas (born 1952)	1 April 2017	6 October 2021	4 years, 188 days	
46	Amador Fernando Enseñat y Berea	General of the Army; Amador Fernando Enseñat y Berea (born 1960)	6 October 2021	Incumbent	4 years, 339 days	

== See also ==
- Chief of the Defence Staff
- Ministers of Defence
- Captain general of the Army
- Spanish Army
- Chief of Staff of the Navy
- Chief of Staff of the Air and Space Force
