= Jaime Domínguez Buj =

Spanish army general

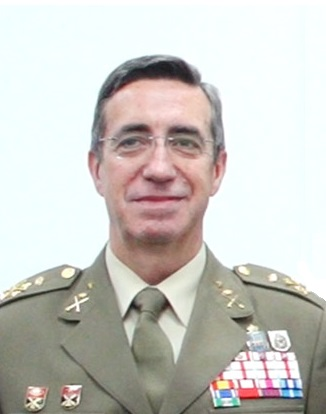

Chief of Staff of the Army (JEME)
- In office 1 July 2012 – 31 May 2017
- Preceded by: Fulgencio Coll Bucher
- Succeeded by: Francisco Javier Varela

Personal details
- Born: 15 March 1952 (age 74) Valencia, Spain

Military service
- Allegiance: Spain
- Branch/service: Spanish Army
- Years of service: 1970–
- Rank: General of army

Jaime Domínguez Buj is a Spanish General of the Army who served as Chief of Staff of the Army (JEME) from July 2012 until 31 March 2017.

== Early life ==
Jaime Domínguez Buj was born in Valencia, Spain on 15 March 1952.

== Military career ==
Jaime Domínguez Buj joined the Spanish Army in 1970. He has held various positions at the General Department of International Affairs of the Directorate General for Defense Policy and the Technical Office of the Ministry and in the Staff of the Army. He has also been advisor to the Second Chief of Staff of the Army and Chief of Staff Operations Command.

A graduate of the General Staff, he has specialized military training in anti-aircraft artillery (fire control systems and target detection and location). He has also studied the law of war and international humanitarian law, advanced human resources management, and topography at the Polytechnic University of Las Palmas, and completed a Master's Degree in International Relations at the Complutense University of Madrid, obtaining an outstanding grade.

He obtained his first destination in the former Recruit Training Center No. 8, located in Alicante, later serving as a gunner in different units located in El Aaiún (Sahara), Ceuta. Cartagena, Las Palmas de Gran Canaria and Paterna (Valencia), allowing him to reach the rank of captain. As a Commander and graduate of the General Staff, he was promoted to the General Staff of the Mechanized Division "Maestrazgo" No. 3.

Jaime Domínguez Buj was later assigned to the General Subdirectorate of International Affairs of the General Directorate of Defense Policy (DIGENPOL), the Technical Office of the Minister of Defense and the Head of the Personnel Section of the Logistics Division, in the Army General Staff.

Already a colonel, in 2001 he was given command of the 73rd Anti-Aircraft Artillery Regiment, based in Cartagena. Two years later he was promoted to Head of the Governing Body of the General Directorate of Recruitment and Military Training of the Ministry of Defense. Promoted to general, he was Secretary General of the Army Training and Doctrine Command (2004), the Operations Division of the Army General Staff (2005), Command of the Operations Division (2007), Head of the Staff of the EMAD Operations Command (2008) and Head of the Operations Command itself (2009). In 2010 he was named lieutenant general. General Domínguez Buj has also been assigned to several United Nations peacekeeping missions abroad (in El Salvador and Bosnia-Herzegovina).

During the period in which Jaime Domínguez Buj was in charge of the Army General Staff, a deep reorganization took place, initiated in 2015, with which it was intended to increase the operability of the different units, adapting their level of response to the new needs of the land doctrine. He attended the inauguration of his successor, Army General Varela Salas, held on April 3, 2017. 1

Jaime Domínguez Buj is married and has three children.

Military offices
Preceded by Fulgencio Coll Bucher	Chief of Staff of the Army; 27 July 2012 – 31 March 2017	Succeeded by Francisco Javier Varela
