= Spanish Republican Armed Forces =

Military of the Second Spanish Republic

- Fuerzas Armadas de la República Española
- Spanish Republican Flag
- Founded: 1931
- Disbanded: 1939
- Service branches: Army; Navy; Air Force

Leadership
- Commander-in-chief: Manuel Azaña (last)
- Prime minister: José Miaja (last)
- Minister of Defence: Segismundo Casado (last)

Personnel
- Active personnel: 225.000 (1936)

Industry
- Domestic suppliers: CASA; Hispano-Suiza; Spanish Society for Naval Construction

Related articles
- History: Sanjurjada; Revolution of 1934; Spanish Civil War
- Ranks: Military ranks of the Second Spanish Republic

The Spanish Republican Armed Forces (Spanish: Fuerzas Armadas de la República Española) were initially formed by the following two branches of the military of the Second Spanish Republic:

- Spanish Republican Army (Ejército de la República Española (1931–1936) and Ejército Popular de la República Española (1936–1939)). It included the Aeronáutica Militar air arm.
- Spanish Republican Navy (Marina de Guerra de la República Española), which included the naval aviation (Aeronáutica Naval).
- Spanish Republican Air Force (Fuerzas Aéreas de la República Española) (FARE)

== History ==
The Spanish Republican Armed Forces went through two phases during their existence:

- The pre-Spanish Civil War phase, before the coup of July 1936 that would fracture the Spanish military institution.
- The Civil War reorganization of the forces that remained loyal to the established republican government.

=== Air Force ===
At the time of the democratic municipal elections that led to the proclamation of the Spanish Republic, the Air Force was divided in two branches, the Aeronáutica Militar and Aeronáutica Naval, the former being the air arm of the Spanish Republican Army and the latter the naval aviation of the Spanish Republican Navy.

In September 1936 the Navy and Air Ministry (Ministerio de Marina y Aire) and the Air Undersecretariat, (Subsecretaria del Aire), both part of the National Defence Ministry (Ministerio de la Defensa Nacional) of the Republic, were established under the command of Indalecio Prieto as minister.

The Republican air arm was restructured again in May 1937, well into the Civil War. The new structure unified the Aeronáutica Militar and Aeronáutica Naval. Some sources give this date as the date of the creation of the Spanish Republican Air Force, although it had been previously operative already under its two branches. The Republican Air Force would keep this structure until this disbandment two years later.

== See also ==
- Military history of Spain
- Spanish Armed Forces
