= Francisco Javier Varela Salas =

Chief of Staff of the Spanish Army

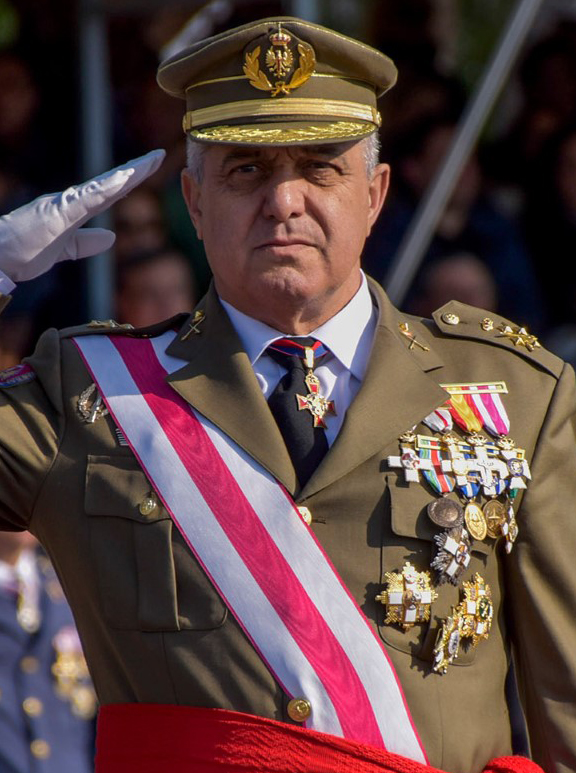
- JEME Varela Salas 2019

Chief of Staff of the Army
- In office 1 April 2017 – 6 October 2021
- Preceded by: A. General Jaime Domínguez Buj
- Succeeded by: A. General Amador Fernando Enseñat y Berea

Personal details
- Born: 1952 (age 73–74) Puertollano, Ciudad Real

Military service
- Allegiance: Spain
- Branch/service: Spanish Army
- Years of service: 1978–2021
- Rank: General of army
- Commands: Spanish Army

Francisco Javier Varela Salas (born 1952 in Puertollano, Spain) is a retired Spanish Army general. He was the Chief of Staff of the Army from 2017 to 2021.

He was enrolled in the Army in 1978 after he graduated from General Military Academy, Zaragoza and was commissioned as 2nd lieutenant. He was moved to Special Operations Company No. 41, Barcelona. He was promoted to captain and served in the Military School of Mountain and Special Operations then as a teacher.

He attended the Army Staff College in 1990, and he was made lieutenant colonel to serve in Rapid Action Force from which he later commands the Legion's XIX Special Operations Flag until 2003. He also participated in the UNPROFOR in 1992 and was made a member of KFOR Kosovo in 2001. When he was made colonel, he served in the Operations Command and Light Forces HQ in 2005. He was chief general of the Legion's Brigade "Rey Alfonso XIII" II in 2009 until 2011 and chief of the Light Forces Command until 2014.

He was made chief general of Land Force after promotion to lieutenant general in 2014, and he became head of the High Availability Land HQ Bétera, Valencia until 2017.

In October 2021, he left the Army Staff after four years as the highest military officer in the Spanish Army. Varela Salas retired from active service that month. For his services, the Council of Ministers granted him the Grand Cross of Naval Merit.
