= Fulgencio Coll Bucher =

Spanish general (born 1948)

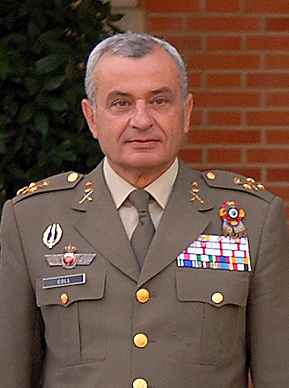
- Born: Fulgencio Coll Bucher; July 18, 1948 (age 78); Palma de Mallorca, Spain
- Military career
- Allegiance: Spain
- Branch: Spanish Army
- Service years: 1966–2012
- Rank: General of the Army
- Commands: Emergency Military Unit

Fulgencio Coll Bucher (born July 18, 1948) is a Spanish general who served as Chief of Staff of the Army. Coll assumed the office on 18 July 2008, replacing Carlos Villar. Jaime Domínguez Buj replaced him on 27 July 2012.

He commanded the Armoured Division No. 1 "Brunete" from 2004.

On December 13, 2018, it was announced that he would be head of the conservative party Actúa-Vox coalition for the 2019 municipal elections in his hometown.

Military offices
Preceded by Carlos Villar	Chief of Staff of the Army; 18 July 2008 – 27 July de 2012	Succeeded by Jaime Domínguez Buj
