= Military Emergencies Unit =

Branch of the Spanish Armed Forces

Emergency Military Unit
- Unidad Militar de Emergencias
- Coat of arms of the unit
- Founded: October 7, 2005; 20 years ago
- Country: Spain
- Role: Emergency management
- Size: 3,987 (2008)
- Part of: Spanish Armed Forces
- Headquarters: Torrejón Air Base
- Motto: Perseverando para servir (Persevering to serve)
- Colors: Yellow
- March: "Himno UME"
- Anniversaries: October 7
- Website: www.mde.es/ume

Commanders
- Commander in Chief: King Felipe VI
- Unit Commander: Lt General Francisco Javier Marcos Izquierdo

Insignia
- Guidon

Aircraft flown
- Bomber: Canadair CL-215
- Utility helicopter: Eurocopter EC135
- Transport: Eurocopter AS532 Cougar

The Emergency Military Unit (Spanish: Unidad Militar de Emergencias, UME; IPA: [uniˈðað miliˈtaɾ ðe emeɾˈxenθjas]) is a branch of the Spanish Armed Forces responsible for providing disaster relief throughout Spain mainly, and abroad if required. It is the newest branch of the Spanish Armed Forces.

== History ==
The decision to create the Military Emergencies Unit was agreed upon at a cabinet meeting of the Zapatero administration on October 7, 2005. This was enacted in law by the Real Decreto 416/2006 (Royal Decree 416/2006) on April 11, 2006.

== Missions ==
1. Intervention during emergencies that have their origin in natural hazards; among these are floods, spill-overs, earthquakes, land slides, large snow storms and other adverse weather conditions.
2. Intervention fighting forest fires.
3. Intervention during emergencies derived from technological hazards; among which are chemical, nuclear, radiological and biological hazards.
4. Intervention during emergencies as a consequence of terrorist attacks or illicit or violent acts, including those acts against critical infrastructures, dangerous installations or with nuclear, biological, radiological or chemical agents.
5. Intervention during situations of environmental contamination.
6. Intervention during any other emergency deemed appropriate by the Prime Minister of Spain.

== Chiefs ==
Rank	Name	Start	End
Lieutenant general	Fulgencio Coll Bucher	21 January 2006	19 July 2008
Lieutenant general	José Emilio Roldán Pascual	25 July 2008	26 September 2012
Lieutenant general	Cesar Muro Benayas	28 September 2012	15 May 2015
Lieutenant general	Miguel Alcañíz Comas	23 May 2015	16 October 2019
Lieutenant general	Luis Manuel Martínez Meijide	23 October 2019	16 August 2023
Lieutenant general	Francisco Javier Marcos Izquierdo	16 August 2023	

== Organisation ==
The UME consists of Headquarters (Unidad de Cuartel General, UCG),

- five emergency intervention battalions (Batallon de Intervención en Emergencias, BIEM),
- a support regiment (Regimiento de Apoyo a Emergencias, RAEM),
- a communications battalion (Batallón de Transmisiones, BTUME) and
- an aviation group (Agrupación de Medios Aéreos, AGRUMEDA)

Name	Headquarters	Areas Served
BIEM I	Torrejón de Ardoz Air Base	Ávila, Segovia, Madrid, Cáceres, Guadalajara, Cuenca, Ciudad Real, Toledo
BIEM II	Morón Air Base	Badajoz, Huelva, Sevilla, Cádiz, Málaga, Córdoba, Jaén, Granada, Ceuta, Melilla, Fuerteventura, Gran Canaria, La Gomera, El Hierro, Lanzarote, La Palma, Tenerife
BIEM III	Bétera	Albacete, Murcia, Alicante, Valencia, Castellón, Balearic Islands
BIEM IV	Zaragoza Air Base	Biscay, Guipúzcoa, Álava, La Rioja, Soria, Navarre, Zaragoza, Huesca, Teruel, Lleida, Tarragona, Barcelona, Girona
BIEM V	San Andrés del Rabanedo	Pontevedra, La Corunna, Lugo, Orense, Asturias, Cantabria, León, Zamora, Salamanca, Valladolid, Palencia, Burgos

Name	Headquarters
UCG	Torrejón de Ardoz Air Base
RAEM	Torrejón de Ardoz Air Base
BTUME	Torrejón de Ardoz Air Base
AGRUMEDA	Torrejón de Ardoz Air Base

== Ranks ==
Officers

NATO code	OF-10	OF-9	OF-8	OF-7	OF-6	OF-5	OF-4	OF-3	OF-2	OF-1
Military Emergencies Unit
Military Emergencies Unit				General de división	General de brigada	Coronel	Teniente coronel	Comandante	Capitán	Teniente	Alférez

Enlisted

NATO code	OR-9		OR-8	OR-7	OR-6	OR-5	OR-4	OR-3	OR-2	OR-1
(Spain) Military Emergencies Unit
(Spain) Military Emergencies Unit	Suboficial mayor	Subteniente	Brigada	Sargento primero	Sargento	Cabo mayor	Cabo primero	Cabo	Soldado de primera	Soldado

== Gallery ==
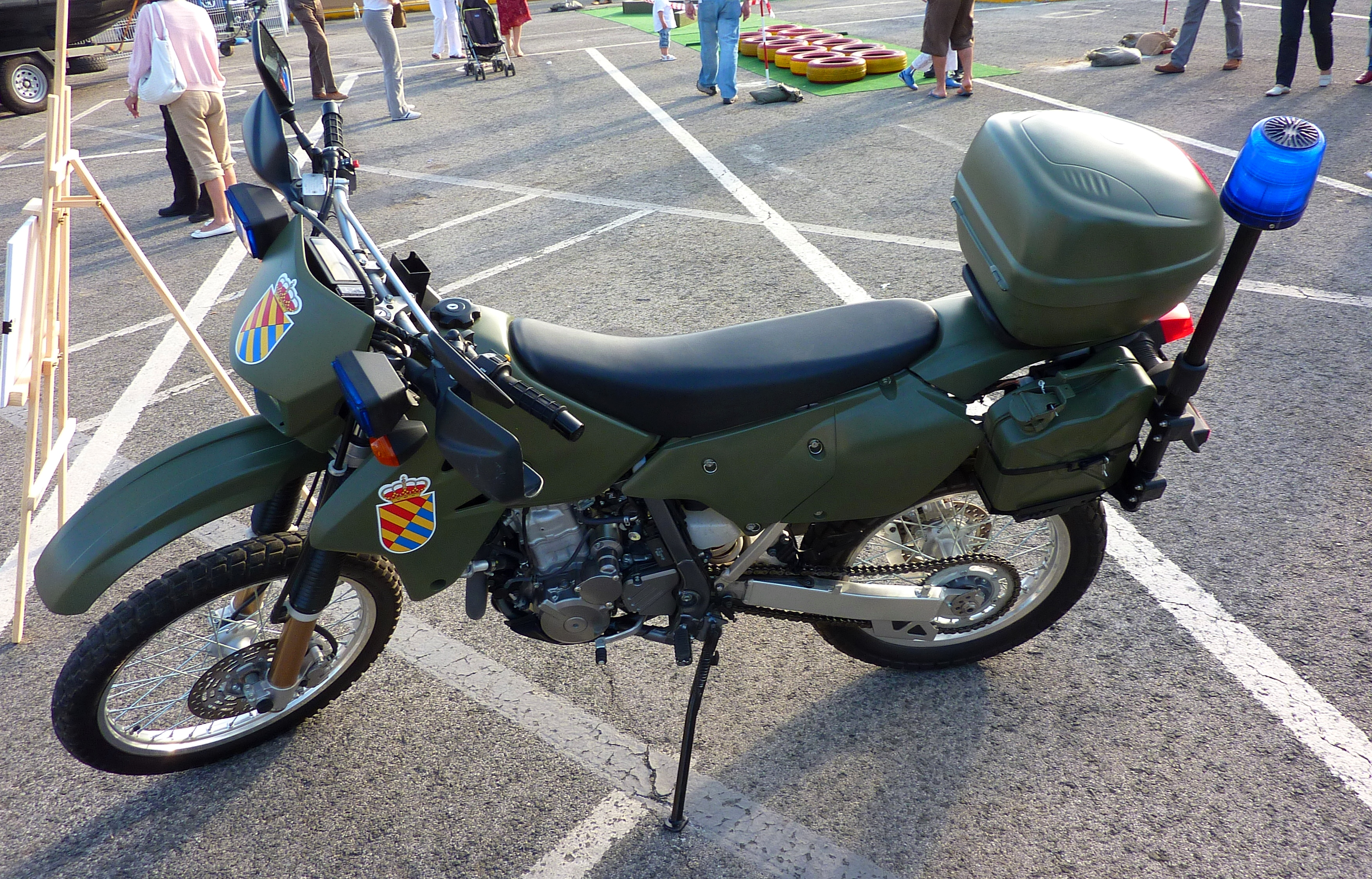
Suzuki DRZ 400 S

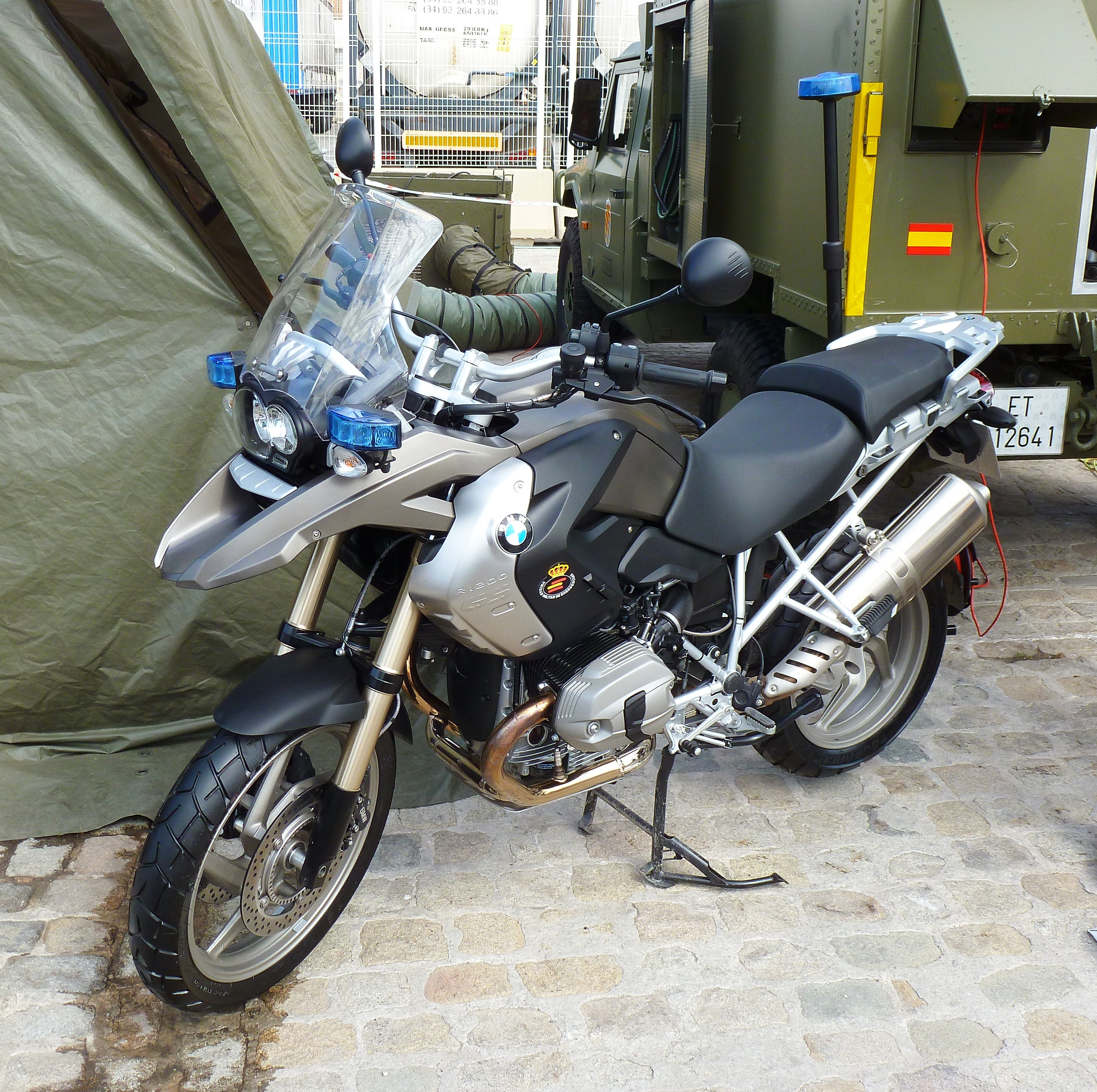
BMW R1200GS

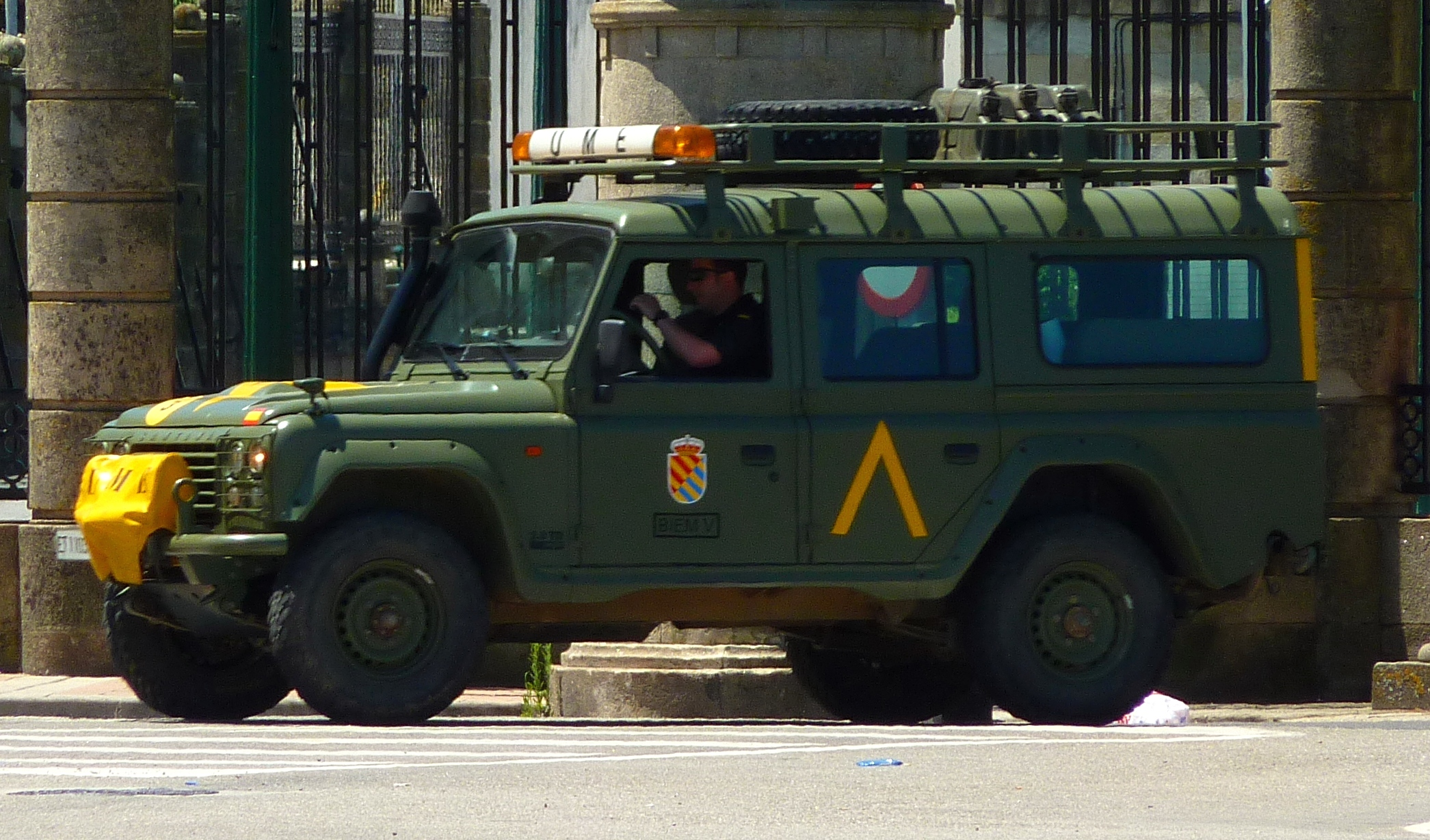
Santana Aníbal

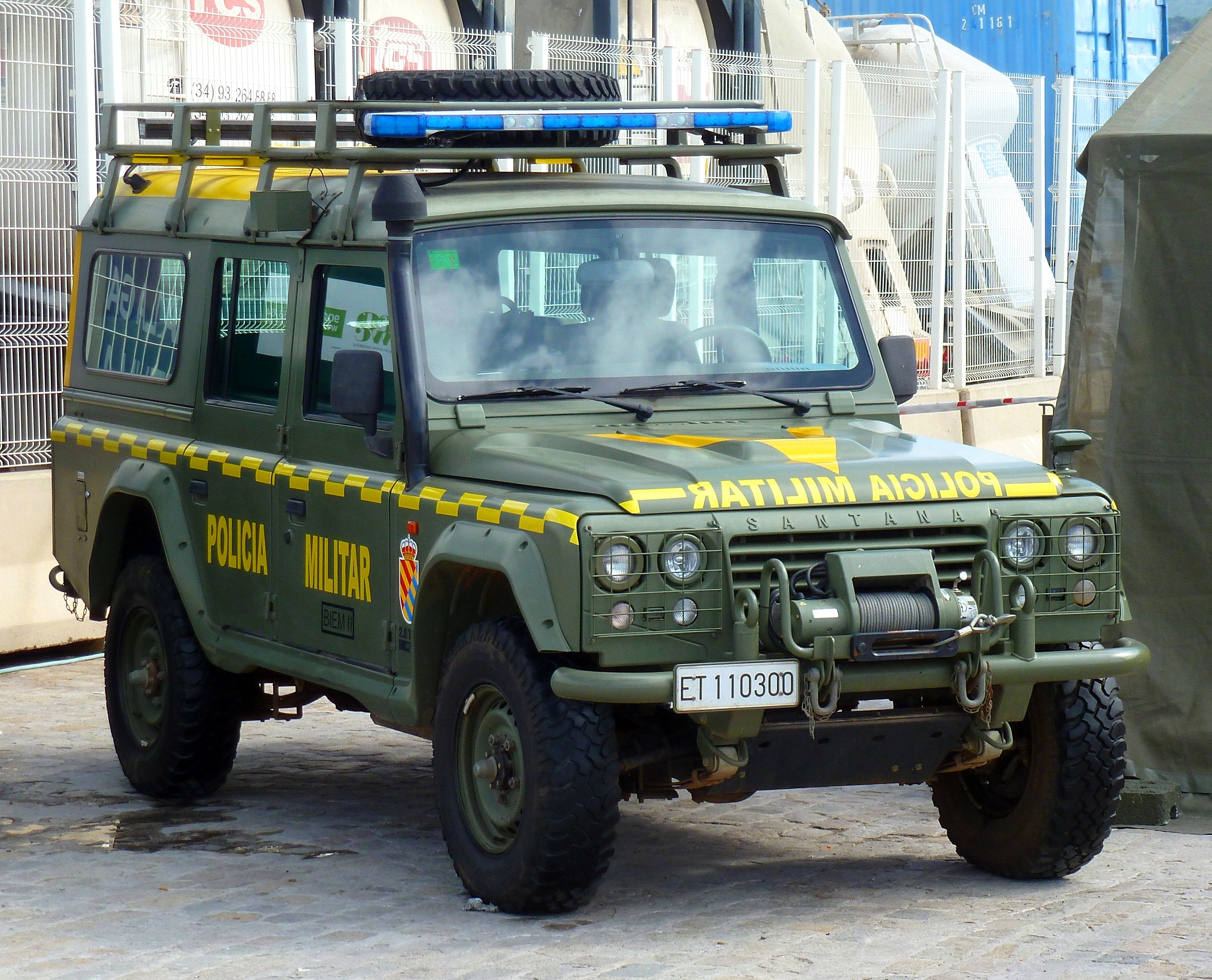
Military police vehicle

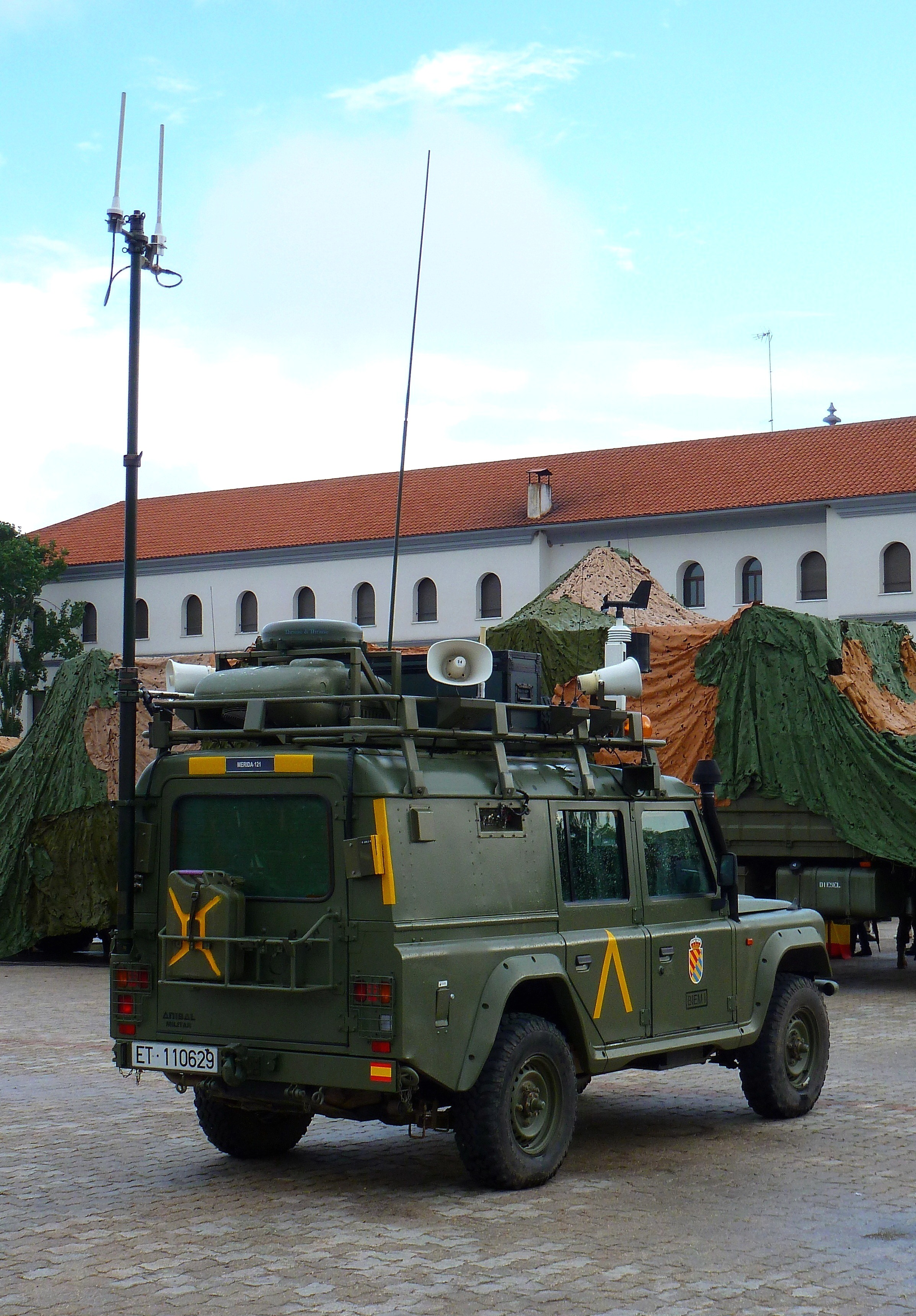
Communications vehicle Mérida

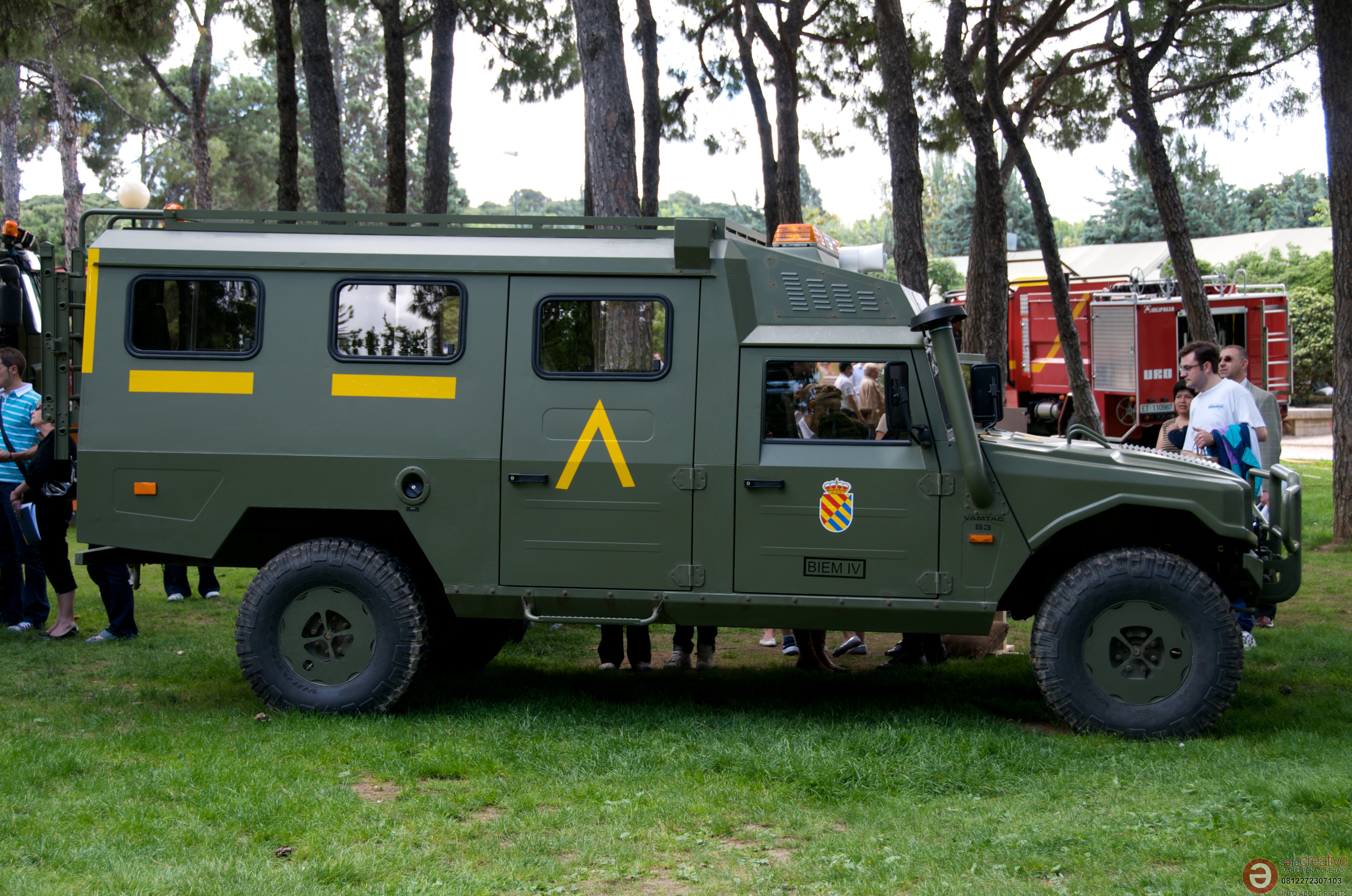
URO VAMTAC

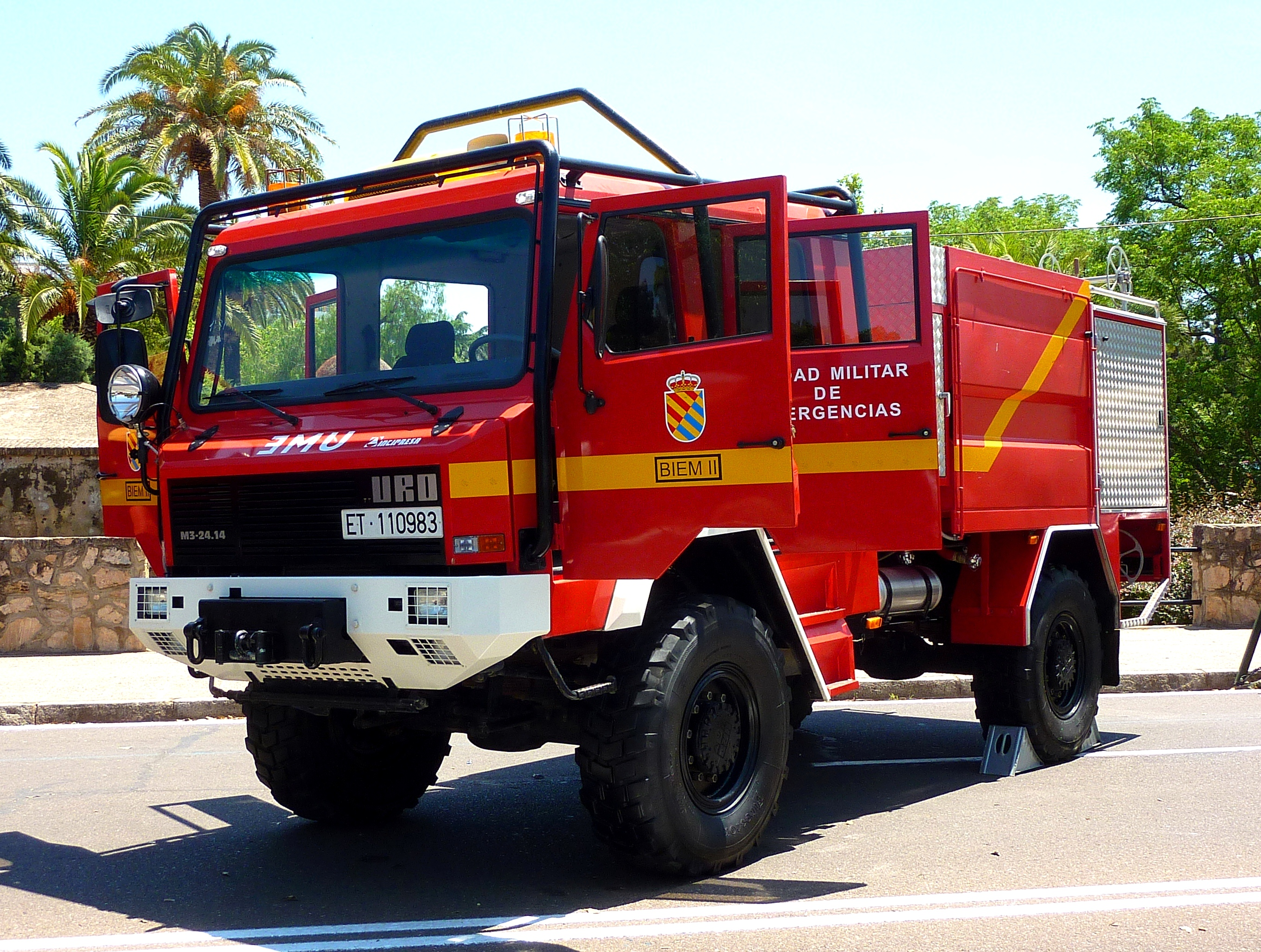
URO M3-24.14. based BFP 40-106 J-1884 firetruck

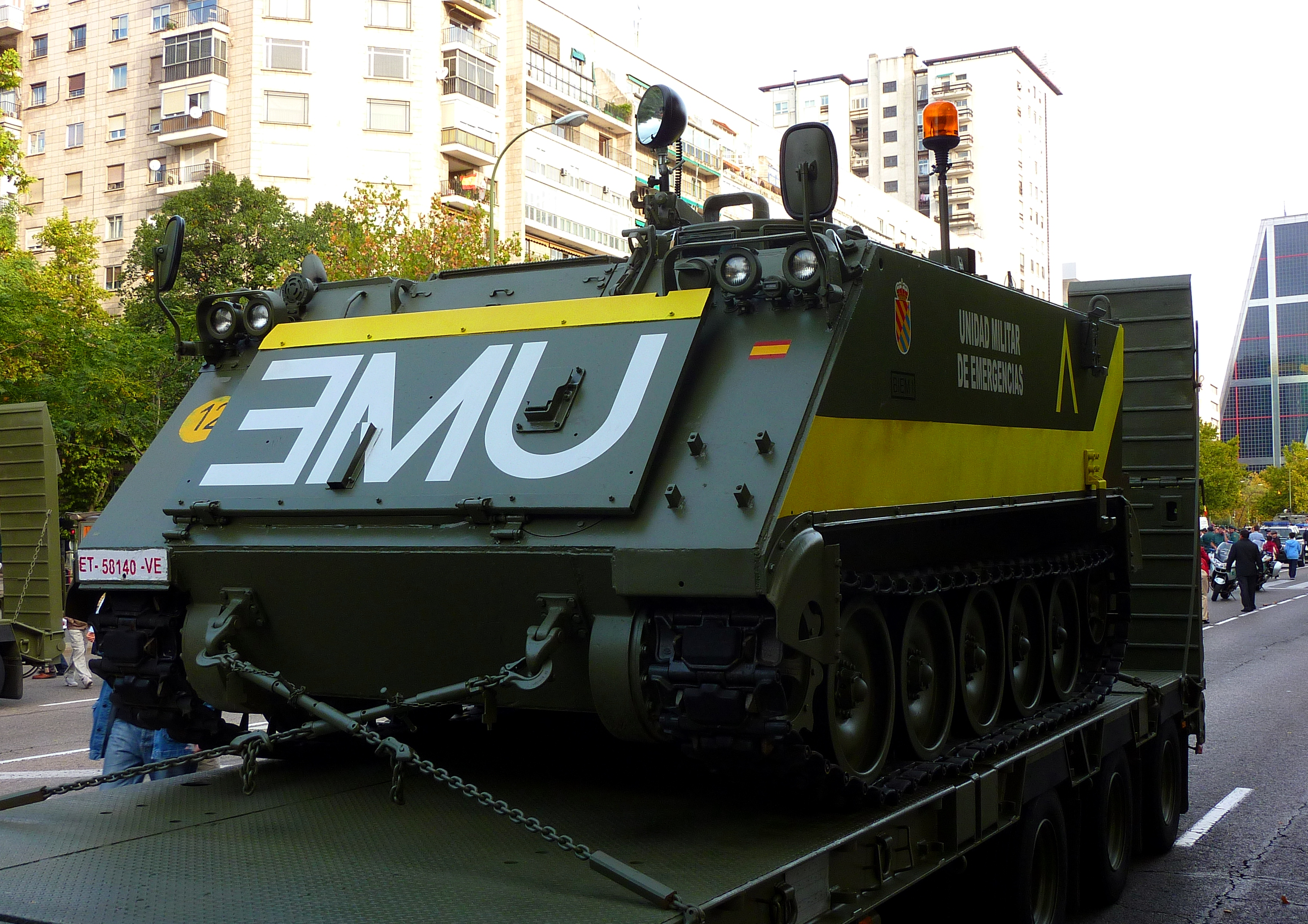
M-113 APC

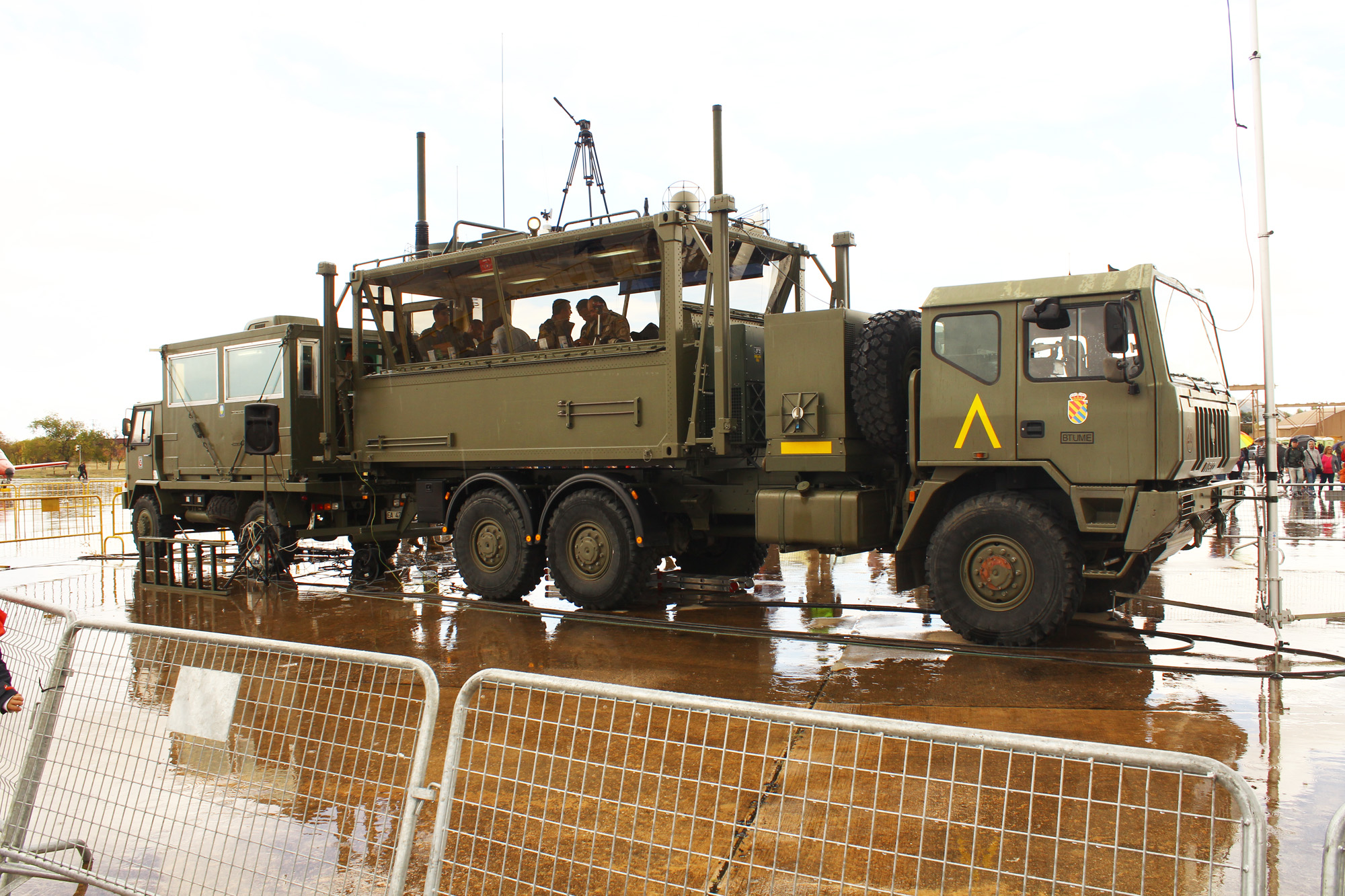
Mobile command center

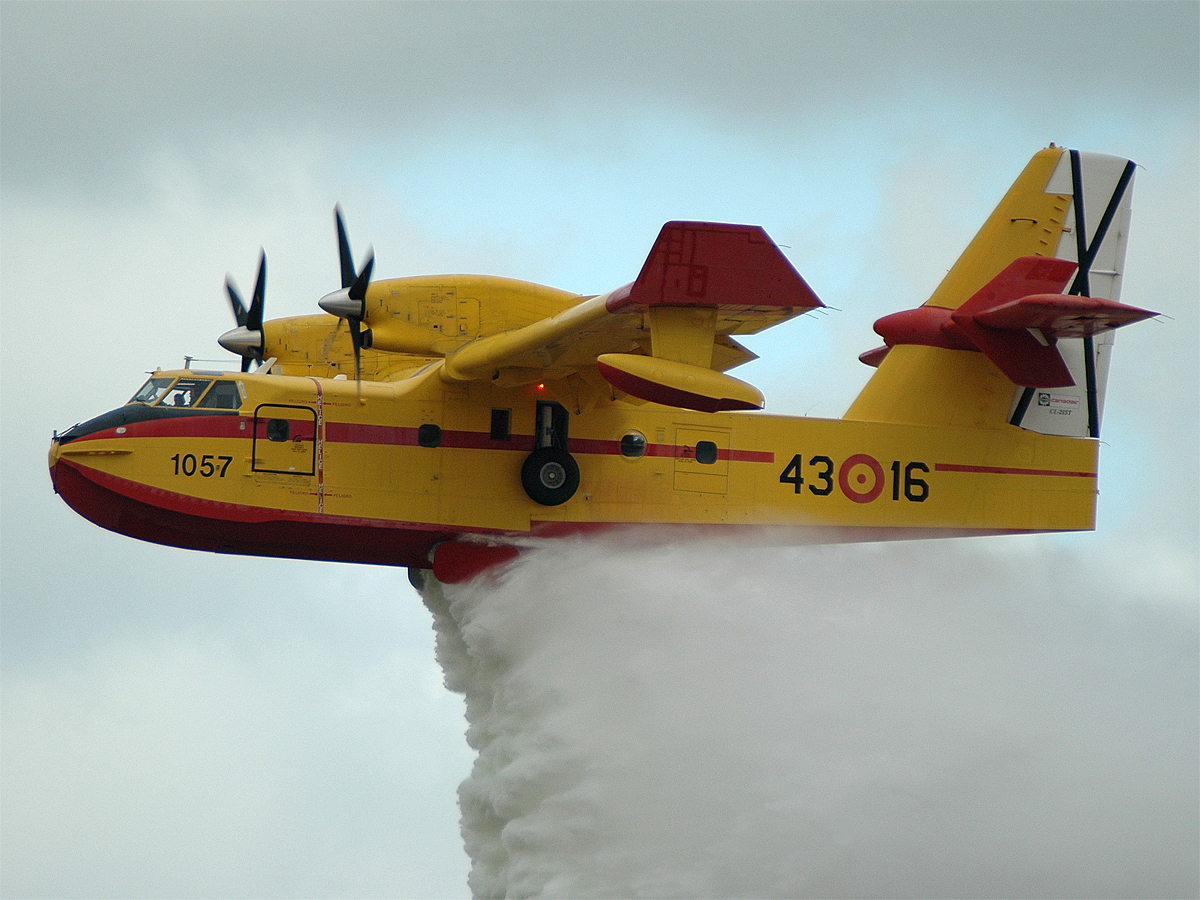
Canadair CL-215T

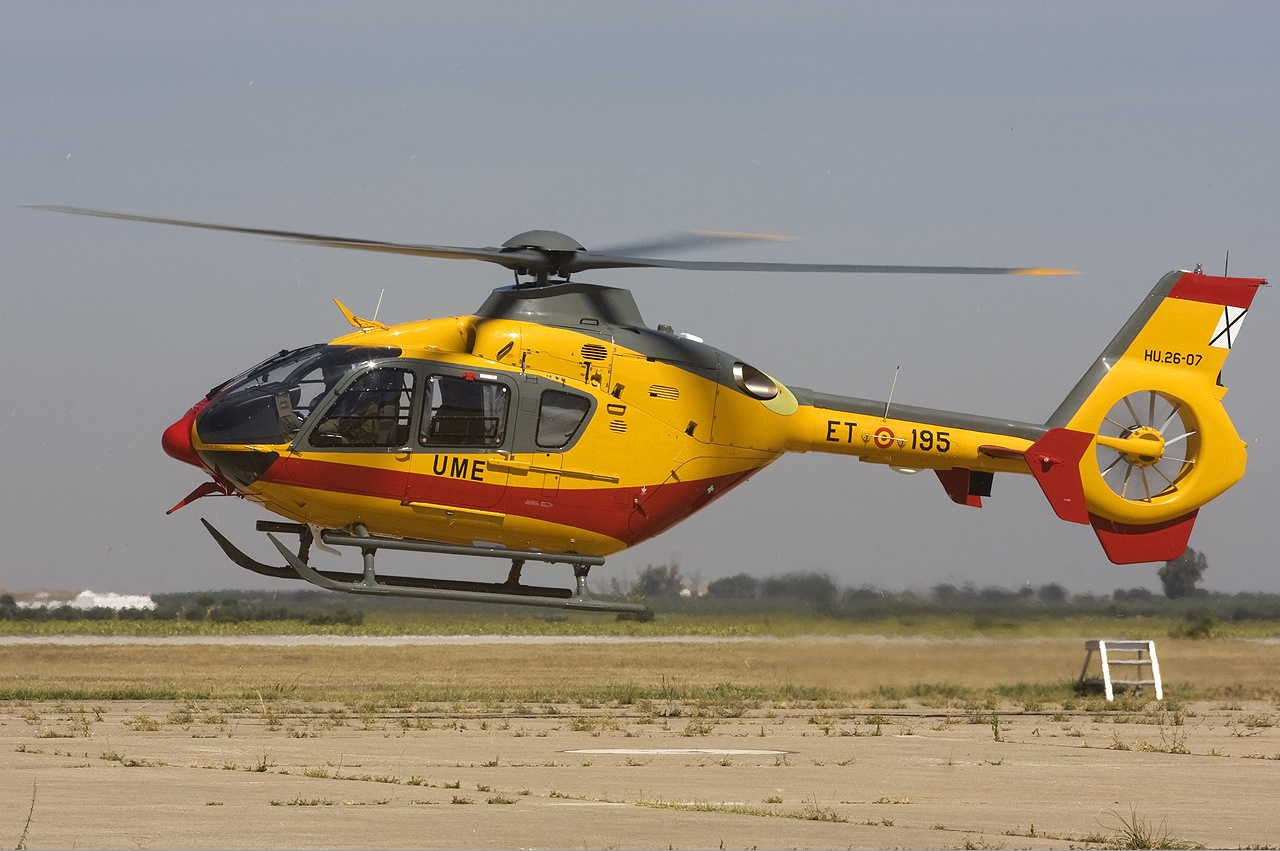
Eurocopter EC135T-2

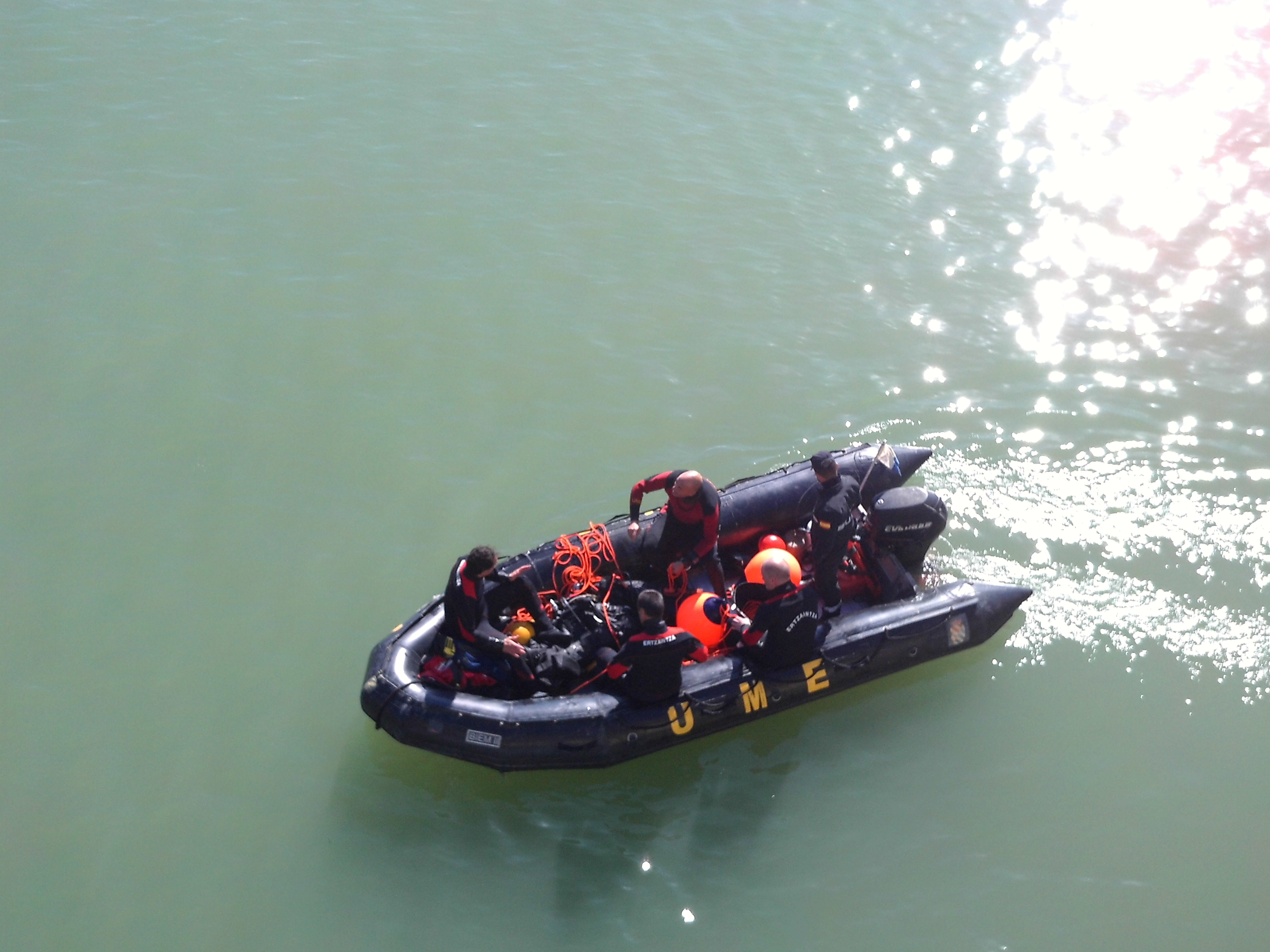
Zodiac IV

== See also ==
- 2011 Lorca earthquake
- Directorate-General for Civil Protection and Emergencies
