= Amador Fernando Enseñat y Berea =

Military- Chief of Staff of the Army (Spain)

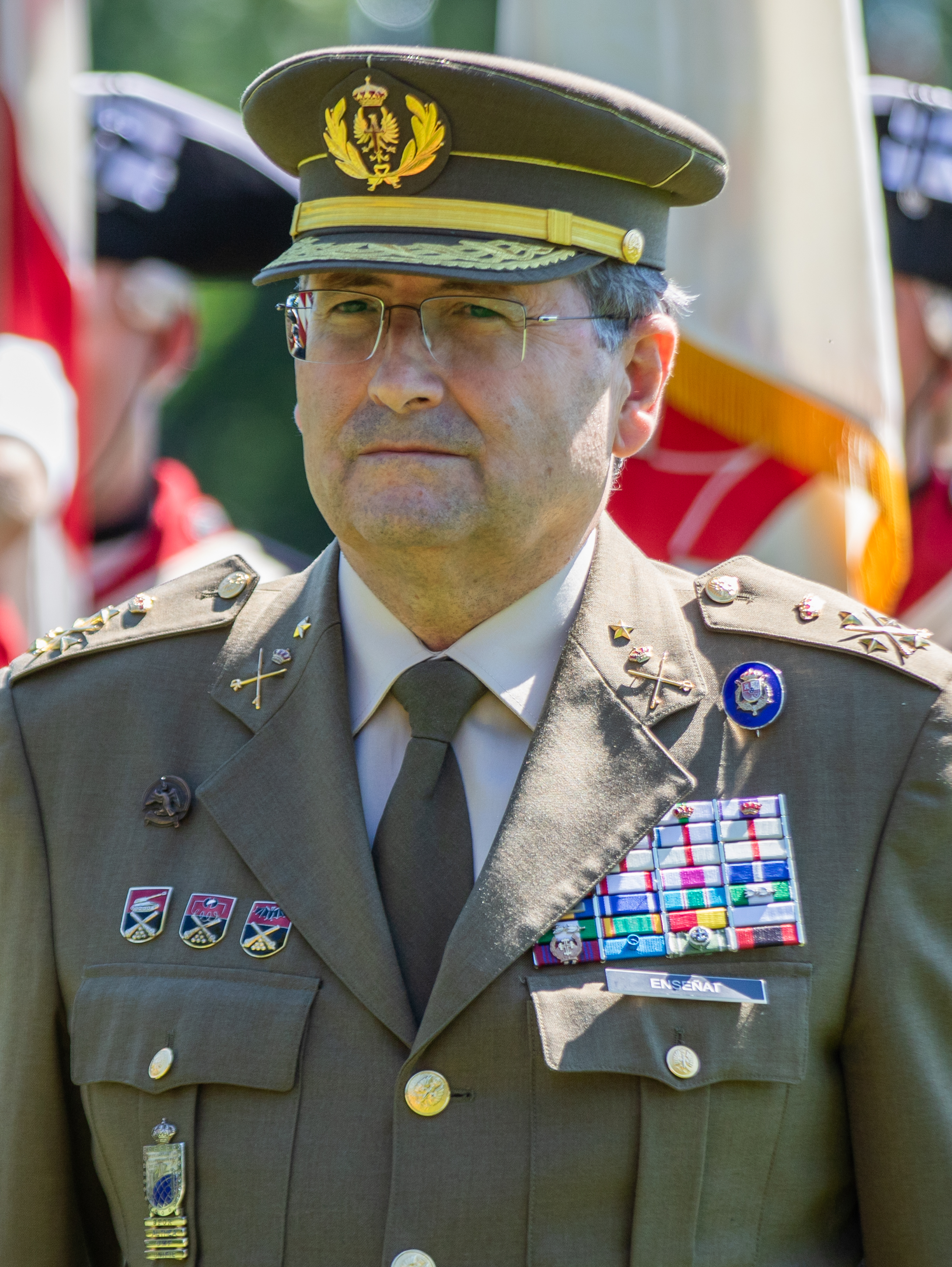
Amador Fernando Enseñat y Berea in 2024

Amador Fernando Enseñat y Berea (born 1960 in A Coruña, Spain) is a Spanish Army general. He is the current Chief of Staff of the Army since 2021. He has had tours of duty in both the European Union and the North Atlantic Treaty Organization (NATO). Additionally, he served in two United Nations missions in Lebanon and Bosnia-Herzegovina. He has an International Relations Master's degree and is the author of one book.
