= Military ranks of the Second Spanish Republic =

The Military ranks of the Second Spanish Republic were the military insignia used by the Spanish Republican Armed Forces. Introduced following the abolition of the monarchy, the ranks were used until the Fall of the Republic.

== Army ==
Red star

In the Civil War, and following the reorganization of the Spanish Republican Armed Forces, the five pointed red star became an insignia of Spanish Republican Army uniforms.

The new insignia mainly replaced the former eight-pointed and six-pointed silver stars that had been part of the Republican Army officers' uniforms between 1931 and 1936.

=== Commissioned officer ranks ===
The rank insignia of commissioned officers.

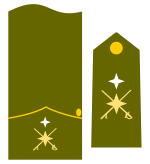
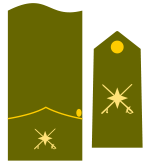
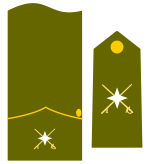
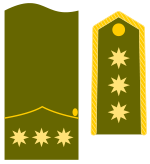
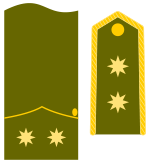
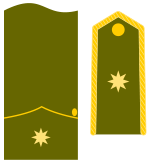
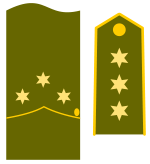
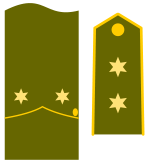
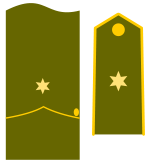
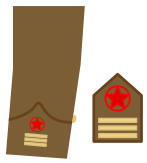
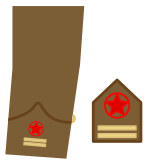
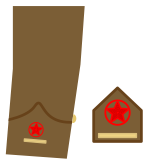
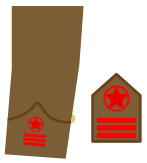
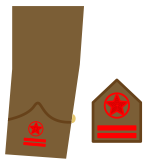
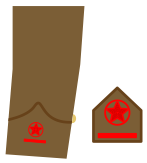
Rank group	General / flag officers			Senior officers			Junior officers
Spanish Republican Army (1931–1936)
Spanish Republican Army (1931–1936)	General inspector	General de división	General de brigada	Coronel	Teniente coronel	Comandante	Capitán	Teniente	Alférez
People's Army of the Republic (1936–1939)
People's Army of the Republic (1936–1939)		General		Coronel	Teniente coronel	Comandante	Capitán	Teniente	Alférez
Political commissars (1936–1939)
Political commissars (1936–1939)				Comisario general	Subcomisario and Secretario general	Comisario inspector	Comisario de brigada	Comisario de batallón	Comisario de compañía
Rank group	General / flag officers			Senior officers			Junior officers

=== Unit commander insignia ===
The republican forces of the Spanish Civil War used three-pointed stars were placed below the rank insignia of officers assigned to the command of units above the size of regiment. One star was used for a brigade, two for a division, three for a corps and four for the commander of an army.

Examples
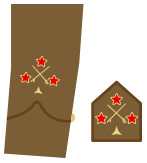
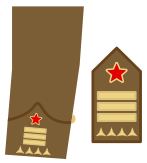
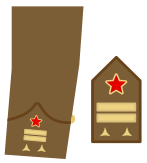
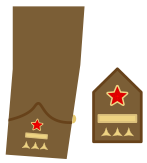
Spanish Republican Army (1936–1939)
Spanish Republican Army (1936–1939)	General commander of a brigade	Coronel commander of an army	Teniente Coronel commander of a division	Comandante commander of a corps

=== Other ranks ===
The rank insignia of non-commissioned officers and enlisted personnel.

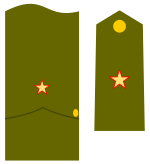
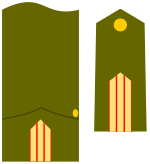
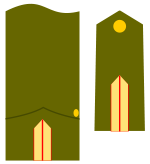
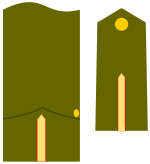
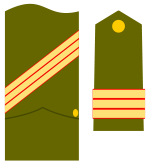
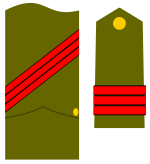
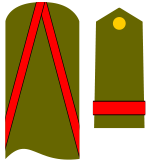
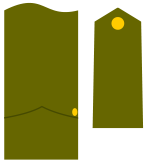
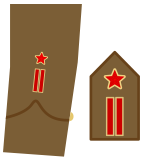
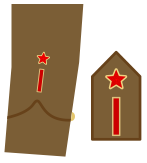
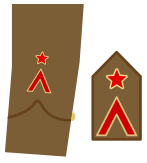
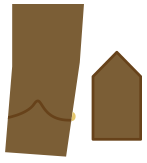
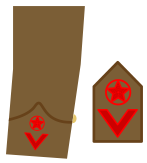
Rank group	Senior NCOs					Junior NCOs	Enlisted
Spanish Republican Army (1931–1936)
Spanish Republican Army (1931–1936)	Subteniente (1931–1934)	Subayudante (1931–1934)	Brigada	Sargento primero	Sargento	Cabo	Soldado de primera	Soldado
People's Army of the Republic (1936–1939)
People's Army of the Republic (1936–1939)			Brigada		Sargento	Cabo		Soldado
Political commissars (1936–1939)
Political commissars (1936–1939)			Delegado político de compañía
Rank group	Senior NCOs					Junior NCOs	Enlisted

== Navy ==
The Spanish Republican Navy introduced a few changes in the flags, ensigns and pennants, as well as in the Navy officer rank insignia. The executive curl (La coca) was replaced by a golden five-pointed star and the royal crown of the brass buttons and of the officers' peaked caps and gorgets (golas) became a mural crown. The officer ranks of the Spanish Republican Navy were as follows below.

=== Commissioned officer ranks ===
The rank insignia of commissioned officers.

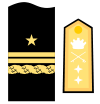
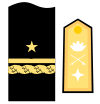
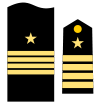
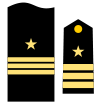
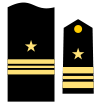
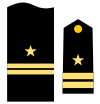
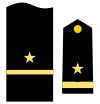
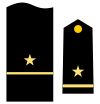
Rank group	General / flag officers		Senior officers			Junior officers
Spanish Republican Navy (1931–1936)
Spanish Republican Navy (1931–1936)	Vicealmirante	Contraalmirante	Capitán de navío	Capitán de fragata	Capitán de corbeta	Teniente de navío	Alférez de navío	Alférez de fragata
Spanish Republican Navy (1936–1939)
Spanish Republican Navy (1936–1939)	Capitán de navío acting as Vicealmirante	Capitán de navío acting as Contraalmirante	Capitán de navío	Capitán de fragata	Capitán de corbeta	Teniente de navío	Alférez de navío	Alférez de fragata

=== Other ranks ===
The rank insignia of non-commissioned officers and enlisted personnel.

Rank group	Senior NCOs				Junior NCOs	Enlisted
Spanish Republican Navy (1931–1939)
Spanish Republican Navy (1931–1939)	Subteniente	Subayudante (1931–1935)	Brigada	Sargento	Cabo	Marinero de primera	Marinero

=== Rank flags and pennants ===
The rank flags and pennants of the Spanish Republican Navy followed the same pattern that had been established for the Spanish Navy in 1914. The only changes were the stripes of equal width and the replacing of the red color of the lower stripe with the morado of the Republican Tricolor.

Rank flag of the Minister of the Navy (Ministro de Marina)

Viceadmiral rank flag

Viceadmiral rank flag (subordinate)

Rear Admiral rank flag

Rear Admiral rank flag (subordinate)

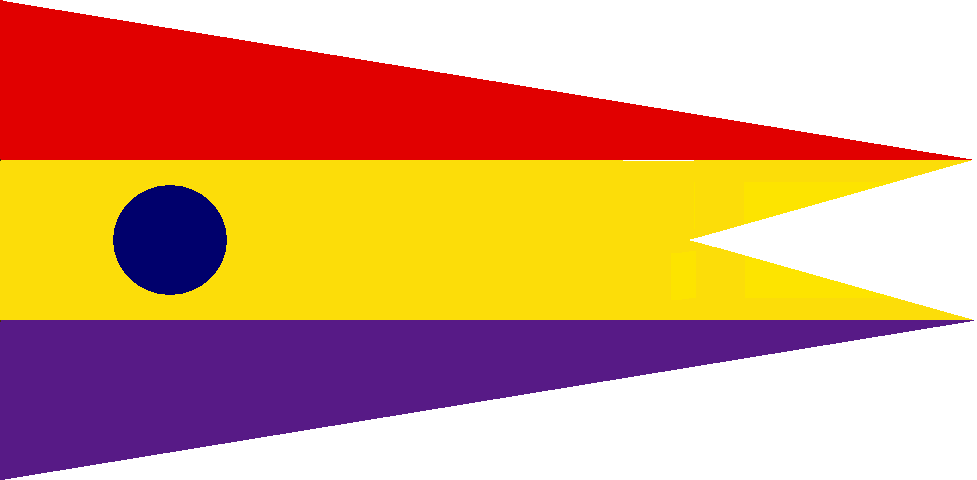
Gallardetón. Captain at Sea Pennant (in command of a naval squadron).

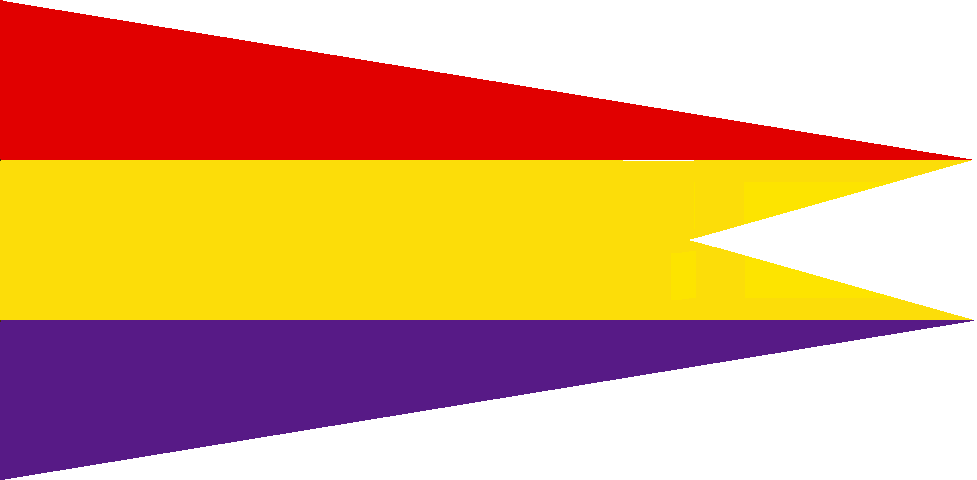
Gallardetón. Captain at Sea Pennant (in command of a naval division).

Gallardete. Commissioning pennant

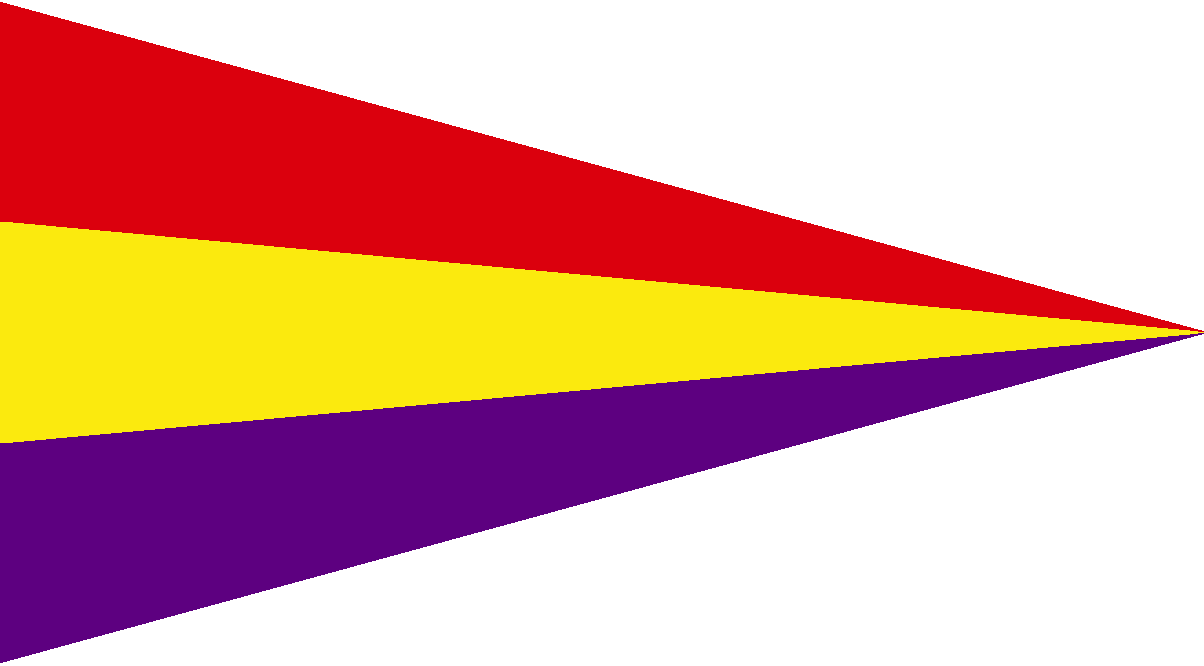
Grímpola. Senior Officer Pennant

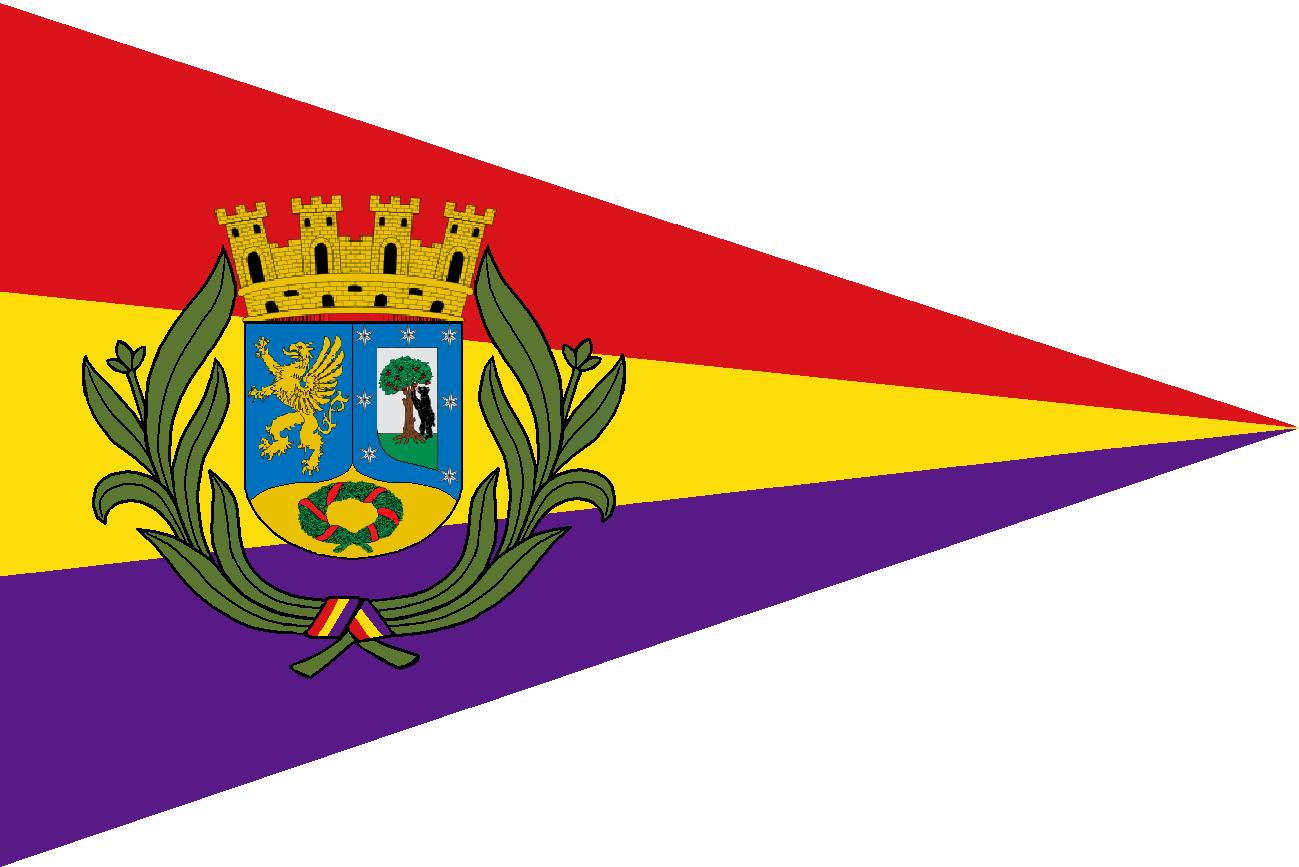
Distintivo de Madrid pennant awarded in 1938 to the vessels that took part in the Battle of Cape Palos

== Air force ==
Spanish Republican Air Force ranks were as follows.

=== Commissioned officer ranks ===
The rank insignia of commissioned officers.

Rank group	General / flag officers	Senior officers			Junior officers
Spanish Republican Air Force (1936–1939)
Spanish Republican Air Force (1936–1939)	General	Coronel	Teniente coronel	Comandante	Capitán	Teniente	Alférez

=== Preceding agencies ===
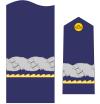
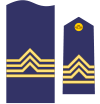
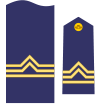
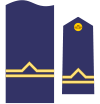
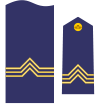
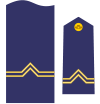
Rank group	General / flag officers	Senior officers			Junior officers
Aeronáutica Militar (1931–1936)
Aeronáutica Militar (1931–1936)	Jefe superior	Jefe de base	Jefe de escuadra	Jefe de grupo	Jefe de escuadrilla	Oficial aviador	-
Aeronáutica Naval (1931–1936)
Aeronáutica Naval (1931–1936)		Capitán de navío	Capitán de fragata	Capitán de corbeta	Teniente de navío	Alférez de navío	Alférez de fragata
