= Alfonso Pardo de Santayana y Coloma =

Chief of Staff of the Spanish Army (1998–2003)

- Born: April 4, 1936; Valladolid, Spanish Republic
- Died: February 28, 2015 (aged 78); Madrid, Spain
- Education: General Military Academy
- Military career
- Allegiance: Spain
- Branch: Spanish Army (Artillery)
- Rank: General
- Unit: FAMET
- Commands: Chief of Staff of the Spanish Army
- Conflicts: Perejil Island crisis
- Awards: Grand Cross of the Royal and Military Order of Saint Hermenegild (1990); Grand Cross of Military Merit with White Decoration (1992); Grand Officer of the Order of Military Merit of Brazil (2002); Grand Cross of the Order of Isabella the Catholic (2003)

Alfonso Pardo de Santayana y Coloma (4 April 1936, Valladolid, Spain – 28 February 2015, Madrid, Spain) was a Spanish military officer who became General of the army and Chief of Staff of the Spanish Army (JEME).

== Military career ==
He entered the General Military Academy in 1950, belonging to the 11th promotion of the Artillery. In 1954, he was promoted to lieutenant. In 1963, as a lieutenant, he was assigned to Artillery Regiment No. 11. In 1964, the Army's first missile unit, the HAWK Group, was created in Antiaircraft Artillery Regiment No. 71, and he was assigned to that unit as a captain. As a captain, in 1975 he was assigned as a trainee to the Headquarters of the Army Airmobile Forces (FAMET). In 1980, he became a military attaché in Washington (US). Promoted to colonel in 1988, he was assigned as Chief of Staff of the FAMET.

In 1989, he was promoted to Brigadier general and assigned to the General Staff of the Army. He was promoted to Divisional general of the General Corps of the Army in 1992 and assigned as Second Chief of Staff of the Army.

In 1995, he was promoted to Lieutenant general and assigned as General Chief of Staff of the III Military Region, Levante Military Region.

In 1997, he became the first General Chief of the Army Manoeuvre Force at the Jaime I Military Base in Bétera, this unit specialized in international missions.

He continued to rise through the ranks and in 1998 reached one of the most important posts in the Spanish Army, being appointed Chief of Staff of the Spanish Army (JEME). He was promoted to the rank of General of the army in 1999 and one of the most notable moments of his tenure as JEME was the Perejil Island crisis in July 2002, when he commanded Operation Romeo-Sierra, a special operations commando to recover the Perejil Island, after it had been invaded for six days by Moroccan gendarmes. In 2003, he resigned as General of the Army and JEME, and went into reserve. In 2000, he joined the Order of Alcántara.

== Awards ==
- 1979: Cross of Aeronautical Merit with second class white badge.
- 1990: Grand Cross of the Royal and Military Order of Saint Hermenegild.
- 1992: Grand Cross of the Order of Military Merit with white insignia.
- 2002: Grand Officer of the Order of Military Merit of Brazil.
- 2003: Order of Isabella the Catholic.
