= Carlos Villar Turrau =

Spanish military officer

Carlos Villar Turrau (born 22 December 1945 in San Sebastián) was a general and Chief of Staff of the Army (Spain) and General of the Army (Spain) from 28 April 2006 to 18 July 2008.
