= Arnedo events =

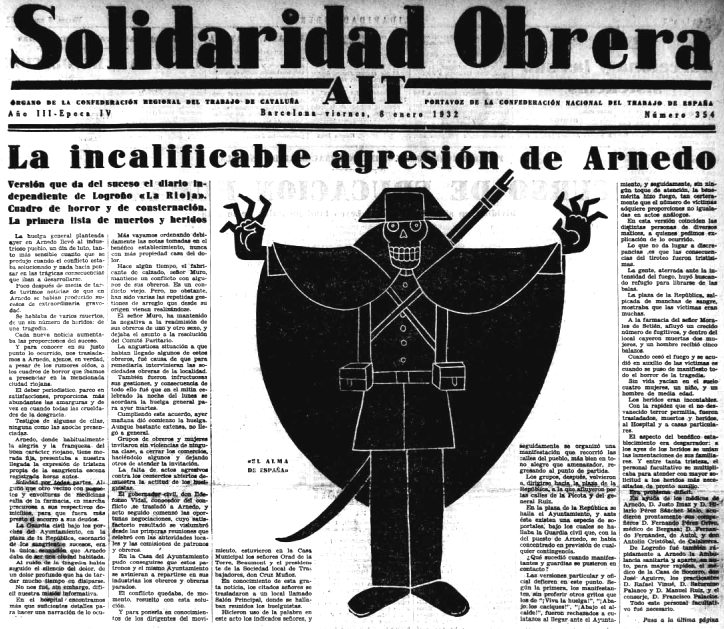
A Civil Guard agent portrayed as the Death, in a cartoon from the anarchist newspaper Solidaridad Obrera in response to the actions of the police forces during the events. January 8, 1932.

Arnedo Events is the name given to the events that occurred in the town of Arnedo (La Rioja) on January 5, 1932, in which eleven people were killed by bullets fired by the Civil Guard and thirty were injured.

== The events ==
Six days after the tragic events in Castilblanco on December 31, 1931, with one peasant and four Civil Guards dead, a new confrontation took place in the La Rioja town of Arnedo between the local population and the Civil Guards. In the town there was a shoe company owned by the Muro family that had fired several workers. As after long talks, with the intervention of the Civil Governor, the fired workers were not reinstated, their coworkers began a strike on Tuesday, January 5 and the Unión General de Trabajadores (UGT) strike committee invited "all conscientious citizens" to join the "run over" workers and "to ask for our bread and that of our children, which those heartless bosses want to snatch from us”. That same day the civil governor, the mayor, several councilors, the head of the Civil Guard command met some employers at the Town Hall with the employers agreeing to reinstate the dismissed workers.

In the Plaza de la República (previously called Plaza de Nuestra Señora de Vico) a crowd of workers on strike gathered with their families and neighbors who accompanied the union delegates who were going to meet at the town hall with the employers to sign the agreement. When the crowd saw the Civil Guard, they apparently burst into hostile shouts against them, calling them "lackeys of capitalism" and asking for the dissolution of the body. The response of the 25 civil guards who were in the square under the command of a lieutenant was to shoot into the crowd without giving any kind of warning. According to some versions, it all started with a worker trying to defend his daughter, a 15-year-old girl who had been beaten by a guard. During this workers' fight with the guards, a guard fell to the ground and the police opened fire on all those gathered, making at least three discharges.

The shooting did not stop until the commander of the Civil Guard who was in the Town Hall went down to the street and ordered the lieutenant to stop shooting. The result was six dead men and five women (among them a mother and her four-year-old son, and a seventy-year-old woman); eleven women and nineteen men injured (including a five-year-old boy whose leg had to be amputated and several elderly people), of whom five were rendered useless for work; and a civilian slightly wounded by a bullet.

== Aftermath ==
Public opinion reacted with indignation and the sympathy that it had shown towards the Civil Guard after the events in Castilblanco turned into hostility, because it was not the first time that the Civil Guard had fired at point-blank range. In the Parliament, opposition deputies called for the immediate dismissal of the general director of the Civil Guard, general Sanjurjo. But a month later, the government gave in to the pressure and replaced him with general Cabanellas, and Sanjurjo went on to lead the Carabineros Corps, which Sanjurjo interpreted as disavowal and degradation by the government (five months later he would lead the first coup attempt to overthrow the Republic). In the conversation that Sanjurjo had with the President of the Government, Manuel Azaña, in which the latter informed him of his dismissal as director of the Civil Guard, Sanjurjo did not speak of the atrocities committed by his subordinates in Arnedo, but instead blamed the “socialist town halls”, where “the worst of each house” had gotten into, “undesirable” people who “encourage disorder, intimidate owners, cause damage to properties and necessarily clash with the Civil Guard”. The socialists, Sanjurjo told Azaña, should not be in the government, "because their presence encourages those who favor excesses".

The military court that on January 30, 1934, tried in Burgos the lieutenant of the Civil Guard who gave the order to shoot in Arnedo acquitted him "of the crime of homicide and injuries due to reckless negligence due to lack of sufficient evidence to appreciate what he had committed" noting that " the same circumstance exists with respect to charges on the Civil Guard force under his orders".
