= Trial of Manuel Azaña =

Court case during the Second Spanish Republic

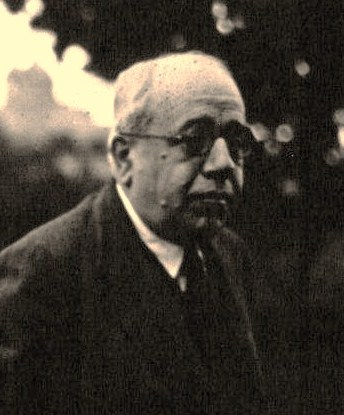
Manuel Azaña in 1932.

The trial of Manuel Azaña took place during the second two-year period of the Second Spanish Republic for the alleged involvement of the former president of the Republican Government and deputy Manuel Azaña in the proclamation of the Catalan State in 1934, framed in the October Revolution.

== Background ==
Azaña was in Barcelona when the uprising of the Generalitat of Catalonia led by Lluís Companys took place on 6 October and was arrested by the police three days later. He remained imprisoned for ninety days until the Supreme Court, the competent judicial body as he was a deputy of the Cortes, ordered his release as no evidence had been found against him. Then another trial was attempted to be opened against him for his alleged involvement in the acquisition of weapons destined for the "October" revolutionaries. On 20 March 1935 Azaña gave a resounding three-hour speech in the Cortes in which, according to Santos Juliá, "he put those who accused him in the dock". According to Gabriele Ranzato, the consequence of all this was that "Azaña, persecuted, was elevated to a symbolic figure of the oppressed, acquiring a popularity he had never had until then."
