= García Sola Reservoir =

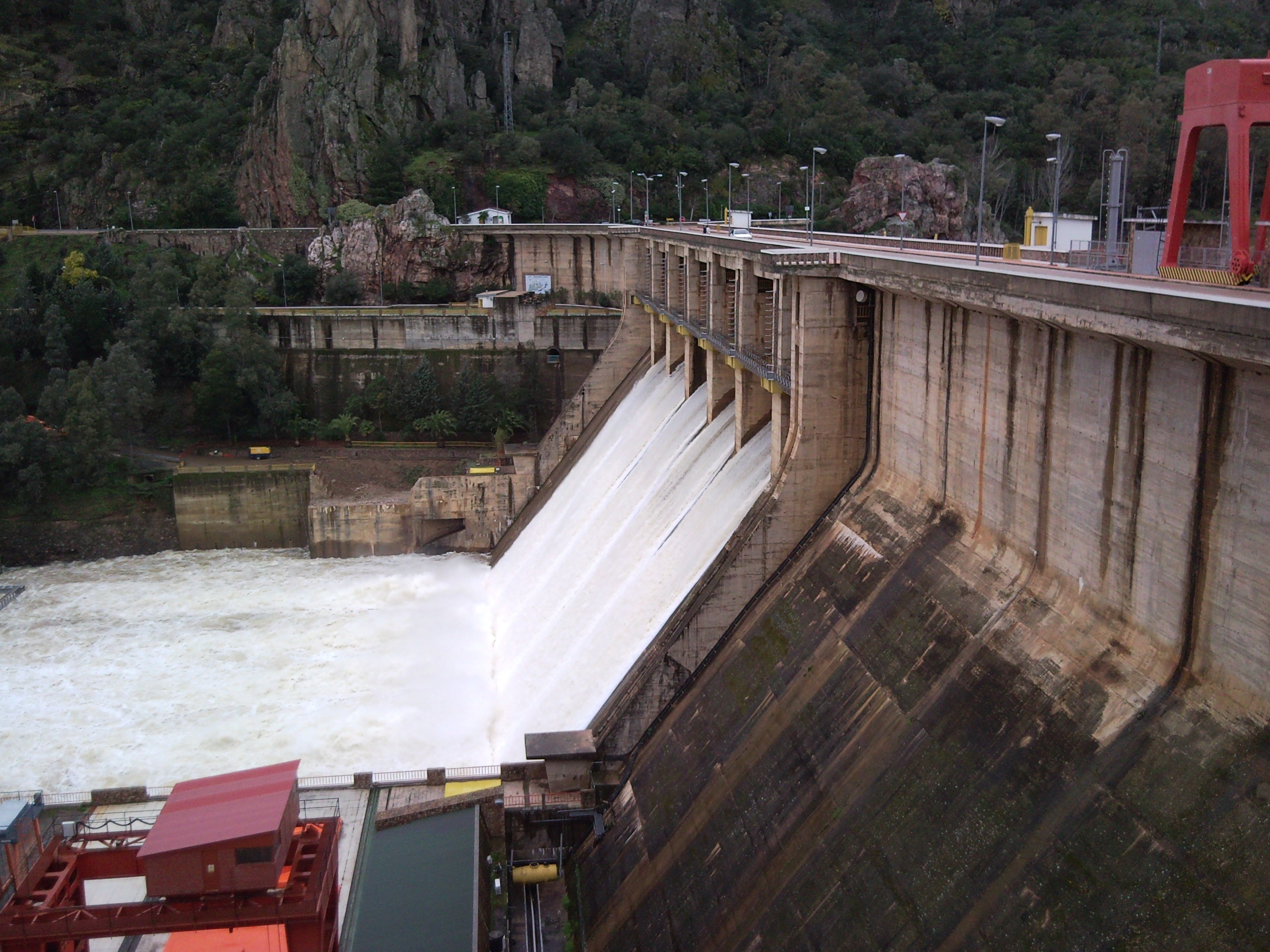

- Location within Extremadura
- Location: Castilblanco, Extremadura, Spain
- Coordinates: 39.1442°N 5.1844°W
- Type: Reservoir
- Primary outflows: Guadiana River
- Basin countries: Spain
- Surface area: 35.5 km^{2} (13.7 sq mi)

The García Sola Reservoir is a reservoir located in the town of Castilblanco in the autonomous community of Extremadura, Spain.

Created by damming the Guadiana river, with an area of 35.5 km^{2} (13.7 sq mi), is one of the largest bodies of freshwater in Extremadura.

== History ==
The reservoir was constructed in 1962.

== See also ==
- Castilblanco
