= Castilblanco events =

1931 confrontation between local peasants and the Civil Guard in Spain

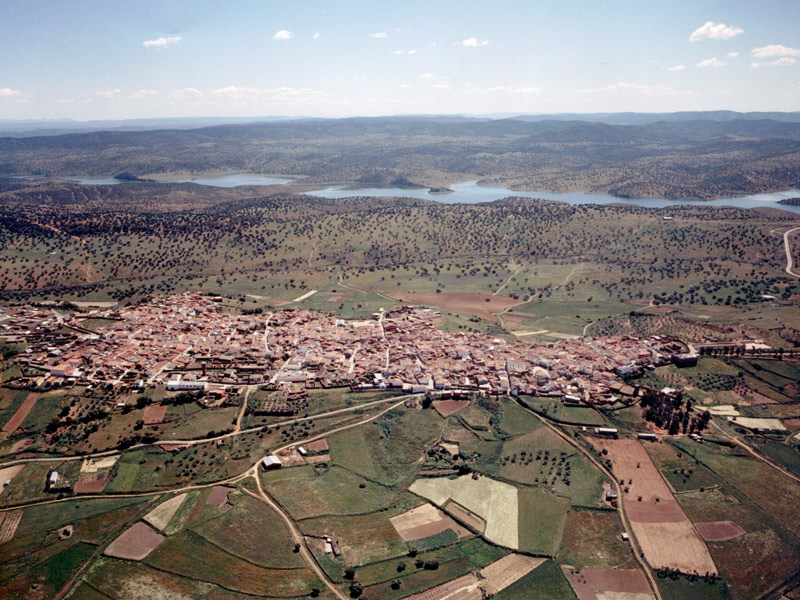
- Castilblanco, in Badajoz
Date	31 December 1931
Location	Castilblanco, Province of Badajoz, Spain

Belligerents
National Federation of Land Workers	Caciques, Civil Guard

Casualties and losses
1 peasant dead	4 Civil Guards dead

The Castilblanco events were a confrontation between local peasants and the Civil Guard that took place in the Spanish town of Castilblanco on 31 December 1931.

== History ==
=== Events ===
The winter of 1931 brought less work for day laborers in Estremadura and Andalusia, which caused social tension. On 20 December 1931 in Castilblanco, the National Federation of Land Workers (Spanish: Federación Nacional de Trabajadores de la Tierra, FNTT) called for a peaceful demonstration to ask for work, but the Civil Guard dissolved it, claiming that it was illegal because no administrative authorization had been requested. The FNTT then called a two-day general strike, the objective of which was the transfer of the local head of the Civil Guard, whom they accused of supporting the owners and caciques resisting recently enacted social legislation.

A new demonstration was called for 30 December and, although this time authorization was requested, the mayor did not grant permission, but in the end it was held without incident as the security forces did not intervene. The following day, the mayor sent the Civil Guard to the Casa del Pueblo, headquarters of the FNTT, to ask that a new demonstration scheduled for that day be canceled. While they were negotiating, a group of women insulted the four Civil Guards outside. A confrontation broke out when the Civil Guard tried to prevent the protesters from entering the premises violently, shooting and killing a protester. Part of the crowd rushed at them with sticks, stones and knives, and lynched the four Civil Guards on the spot. The burial of the four Civil Guards was presided over by the interior minister, Santiago Casares Quiroga.

=== Repercussions ===
Gregorio Marañón published an article in El Sol in which he explained that the murders were the result of the inhumane conditions in which the Extremaduran day laborers lived, claiming that those who were truly responsible for the deaths were those that kept the peasants in a state of shameful misery and backwardness. This was one of the arguments used by Luis Jiménez de Asúa, defense attorney for the defendants; but the court handed down six death sentences, later commuted to life imprisonment.

A few days later, in Zalamea de la Serena, the Civil Guard killed two peasants and wounded three more. In Épila, on 2 January the workers of a sugar factory went on strike to demand that those registered in that municipal area be hired preferentially. They were supported by the local day laborers, who that day did not go out to work in the fields and closed some establishments. The next day, 3 January, about five hundred people gathered in the town square. The Civil Guard intervened to clear the square, leading to a confrontation in which two people died and several more were injured. The following day, 4 January, peasants in Xeresa confronted the employers who did not accept their proposed demands. They threw insults and stones at the Civil Guard, which charged at the crowd on horseback with swords and gunfire, killing four and wounding thirteen, two of them women.

On 5 January 1932, in the town of Arnedo, province of Logroño, there was another clash with the Civil Guard, when a group of workers accompanied a delegation to a meeting with their employers, to negotiate the end of a strike called by the General Union of Workers (Spanish: Unión General de Trabajadores, UGT). When the Civil Guard approached the assembled workers, they began to insult them and the Civil Guard responded by opening fire against the crowd, killing eleven people—including a child and five women—and wounding thirty. According to other versions the fight broke out when a 15-year old girl was hit by a Civil Guard. The Cortes requested the removal of José Sanjurjo, but the Azaña government refused to do so; instead a month later he was replaced as head of the Civil Guard by Miguel Cabanellas, and appointed head of the Carabineros. Some months later, on August 10, 1932, Sanjurjo was one of the protagonists of a failed coup attempt that became known as Sanjurjada.
