= SP Castilblanco =

Spanish football club

Castilblanco
- Full name: Sociedad Polideportiva Castilblanco
- Founded: 1980
- Dissolved: 2019
- Ground: Las Pedreras, Castilblanco, Extremadura, Spain
- 2018–19: Segunda Extremeña – Group 2, 15th of 16
Home colours	Away colours

Sociedad Polideportiva Castilblanco was a Spanish football team based in Castilblanco, in the autonomous community of Extremadura. Founded in 1980 and dissolved in 2019, it last played in Segunda Extremeña – Group 2, and held home games at Estadio Las Pedreras.

== Season to season ==
Season	Tier	Division	Place	Copa del Rey
1984–85	7	2ª Reg.	2nd	
1985–86	7	2ª Reg.	1st	
1986–87	7	2ª Reg.		
1987–88	7	2ª Reg.	4th	
1988–1999	DNP			
1999–2000	6	1ª Reg.	10th	
2000–01	6	1ª Reg.	10th	
2001–02	6	1ª Reg.	11th	
2002–03	6	1ª Reg.	8th	
2003–04	6	1ª Reg.	11th	
2004–05	6	1ª Reg.	9th	
2005–06	6	1ª Reg.	12th	
2006–07	6	1ª Reg.	12th	

Season	Tier	Division	Place	Copa del Rey
2007–08	6	1ª Reg.	12th	
2008–09	6	1ª Reg.	14th	
2009–10	6	1ª Reg.	9th	
2010–11	6	1ª Reg.	13th	
2011–12	6	1ª Reg.	10th	
2012–13	6	1ª Reg.	10th	
2013–14	6	1ª Reg.	11th	
2014–15	6	1ª Reg.	13th	
2015–16	6	1ª Reg.	11th	
2016–17	DNP			
2017–18	6	2ª Ext.	14th	
2018–19	6	2ª Ext.	15th	
