= Miguel Cabanellas =

Spanish military officer

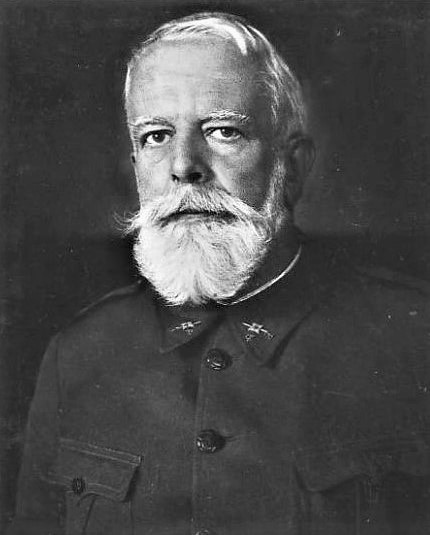
- Cabanellas in 1936.

President of the National Defense Junta
- In office 25 July 1936 – 30 September 1936
- Preceded by: Position established
- Succeeded by: Francisco Franco (Head of State); Fidel Dávila Arrondo (President of the Technical State Junta)

Personal details
- Born: Miguel Cabanellas Ferrer; 1 January 1872 Cartagena, Spain
- Died: 14 May 1938 (aged 66) Málaga, Spain (rebel zone)
- Occupation: Military officer

Military service
- Allegiance: Kingdom of Spain; Spanish Republic; Nationalist Spain
- Branch/service: Spanish Army
- Years of service: 1889–1938
- Battles/wars: Rif War; Spanish Civil War

Miguel Cabanellas Ferrer (1 January 1872 – 14 May 1938) was a Spanish Army officer. He was a leading figure of the 1936 coup d'état in Zaragoza and sided with the Nationalist faction during the Spanish Civil War.

== Biography ==
Born on 1 January 1872 in Cartagena, he joined the army in 1889. A cavalry officer, as a major he managed the creation of the African Regular troops (Moroccan troops in the Spanish army). In August 1921 he participated in the reconquest of the surroundings of Melilla, occupied by rebel Rifian forces after the Battle of Annual. He was promoted to brigadier general and made envoy to the island of Menorca as military governor. Miguel Primo de Rivera permitted him to go into the reserves in 1926, which led him to participate in a revolt frustrated in 1929. For his support of the republicans, on 17 April 1931 the provisional government of the Republic named him commander-in-chief of Andalusia. Later he was named commander of the troops in Morocco and, after the events of Castilblanco and Arnedo, replaced José Sanjurjo in the main directorate of the Civil Guard.

Cabanellas was a freemason. In 1934 he was a delegate of the Radical Republican Party. In July 1936 he was head of 5ª Organic division based in Zaragoza, where on 19 July he declared his support for the Nationalists. Due to his seniority, he was made president of the National Defense Junta, which on 21 September 1936 dissolved itself and proclaimed Francisco Franco supreme leader of the Nationalists and Generalissimo – though Cabanellas was the only one who dissented to this choice. He warned his fellow rebel generals that "You don’t know what you have done because you don’t know him as do I, given that he was under my command in the African Army… If you give him Spain, he is going to believe that it is his and he will not allow anyone to replace him in the war or after it, until his death." He was later Chief inspector of the Army until his death.
