= José Sanjurjo =

Spanish military officer and 1936 coup leader (1872–1936)

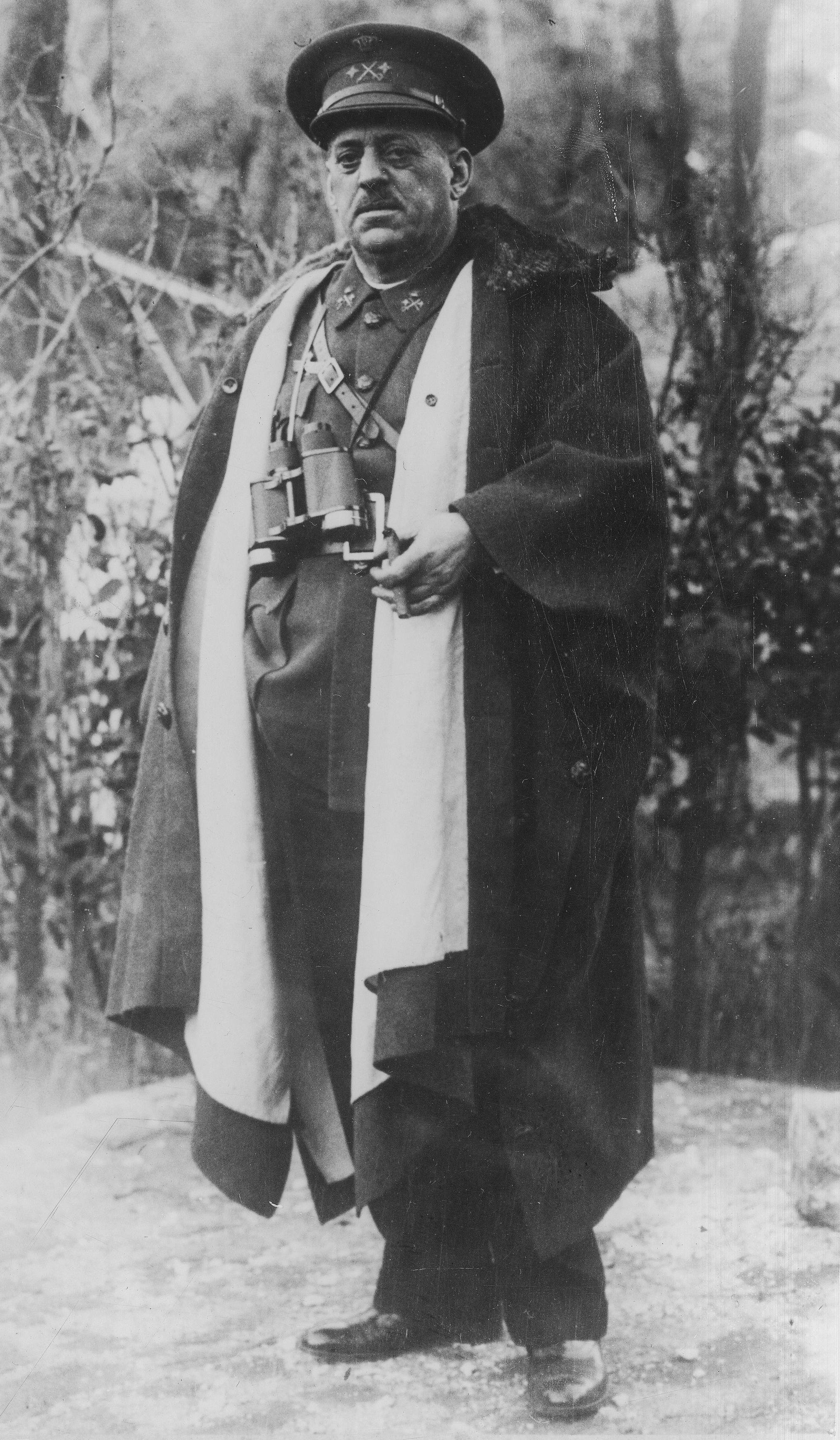
- Sanjurjo c. 1928–1932
- Born: 28 March 1872; Pamplona, Navarra, Spain
- Died: 20 July 1936 (aged 64); Cascais, Portugal
- Burial place: Panteón de Regulares número 2, Cementerio Municipal de la Purísima Concepción, Melilla, Spain; 35.300667°N 2.939141°W
- Military career
- Allegiance: Kingdom of Spain (1896–1931); Spanish Republic (1931–1936); Nationalist Spain (1936)
- Branch: Spanish Army
- Service years: 1896–1932
- Rank: Lieutenant General
- Nicknames: "El León del Rif" (The Lion of the Rif)
- Conflicts: Cuban War of Independence; Spanish–American War; Rif War (1909); Rif War (1920); Spanish Civil War
- Awards: Laureate Cross of Saint Ferdinand; Order of Charles III

High Commissioner of Spain in Morocco
- In office 2 November 1925 – 3 November 1928
- Monarch: Alfonso XIII
- Prime Minister: Miguel Primo de Rivera
- Minister of State: Fernando Espinosa de los Monteros y Bermejillo; José de Yanguas; Miguel Primo de Rivera
- Preceded by: Miguel Primo de Rivera
- Succeeded by: Francisco Gómez-Jordana Sousa
- In office 22 April – 5 June 1931
- President of the Provisional Government: Niceto Alcalá-Zamora
- Minister of State: Alejandro Lerroux
- Preceded by: Francisco Gómez-Jordana Sousa
- Succeeded by: Luciano López Ferrer

Director General of the Civil Guard of Spain
- In office 3 November 1928 – 3 February 1932
- Monarch: Alfonso XIII (Note: Until 14 April 1931)
- President: Niceto Alcalá-Zamora (Note: Since 16 December 1931)
- Prime Minister: Miguel Primo de Rivera; Dámaso Berenguer; Juan Bautista Aznar; Manuel Azaña (Note: Previously, he and Alcalá-Zamora as President of the Provisionall Government, equaling to the post of Prime Minister)
- President of the Provisional Government (Note: Since 14 April until 16 December 1931): Niceto Alcalá-Zamora; Manuel Azaña
- Minister of War (Note: Since14 April 1931): Manuel Azaña
- Minister of the Army: Julio Ardanaz; Dámaso Berenguer
- Preceded by: Ricardo Burguete
- Succeeded by: Miguel Cabanellas

José Sanjurjo y Sacanell (Spanish: [saŋˈxuɾxo]; 28 March 1872 – 20 July 1936) was a Spanish military officer and aristocrat who was one of the military leaders who plotted the July 1936 coup d'état that started the Spanish Civil War.

He was endowed the nobiliary title of "Marquis of the Rif" in 1927.

A monarchist opponent of the Second Spanish Republic proclaimed in 1931, he led a coup d'état known as la Sanjurjada in August 1932. The authorities easily suppressed the coup and initially condemned Sanjurjo to death, then later commuted his sentence to life imprisonment. The government of Alejandro Lerroux—formed after the 1933 general election—eventually amnestied him in 1934.

He took part, from his self-exile in Portugal, in the military plot for the 1936 coup d'état. Following the coup, Sanjurjo, expected by some to become the commander-in-chief of the Nationalist faction, died in an air crash on the third day of the war, when travelling back to Spain. He had chosen to fly in a small, overloaded plane, because the pilot was a friend of his. Sabotage was suspected, but never proven.

== Early life ==
Sanjurjo was born in Pamplona. His father, Captain Justo Sanjurjo Bonrostra, was a Carlist. His mother was Carlota Sacanell Desojo.

== Military career ==
=== Early career ===
He served in Cuba during the Cuban War of Independence in 1896, in Morocco during the Second Melillan campaign and later the Rif War, including the regaining of the territory in Melilla lost after the Battle of Annual in 1921. In 1922, he was assigned to investigate corruption in the army command of Larache. He was High Commissioner of Spain in Morocco and reached the rank of lieutenant general. In 1925 he participated in the amphibious landing at Alhucemas. With the completion of the 1920 Rif War, King Alfonso XIII awarded him the Gran Cruz de Carlos III on 28 March 1931. In 1928 he was made chief of a main directorate of the Civil Guard.

=== During the Second Republic ===
In 1923, Miguel Primo de Rivera came to power in a military coup, ruling Spain as dictator. Gradually, Primo de Rivera's support faded, and he resigned in January 1930. General Dámaso Berenguer was ordered by the king to form a replacement government, which annoyed Sanjurjo, who considered himself far better qualified. Berenguer's dictablanda dictatorship failed to provide a viable alternative to Primo de Rivera. In the municipal elections of 12 April 1931, little support was shown for pro-monarchy parties in the major cities, and large numbers of people gathered in the streets of Madrid. Asked if the government could count on the support of Sanjurjo's Civil Guard, he rejected the suggestion. King Alfonso XIII abdicated, and the Second Spanish Republic was formed.

Despite Manuel Azaña's military reforms of 1931, Sanjurjo retained his post as the commander of the Civil Guard; under his command they continued to use their traditionally brutal tactics such as the "ley de fugas", the excuse of shooting prisoners and later claiming that they were attempting to escape during an incident of unrest in Seville.

Sanjurjo became one of the first generals appointed to the command of the Spanish Republican Army. His sympathies, however, remained with the monarchist cause. When he clashed with Prime Minister Manuel Azaña over the military reforms, he was replaced by General Miguel Cabanellas. He was demoted to chief of the customs officers in 1932 as a result of the events of Castilblanco and Arnedo involving the Civil Guard. His confrontation with the ministry, Azaña's military reforms, and the grants of regional autonomy to Catalonia and the Basque Country, led Sanjurjo to plot a rebellion with some Carlists under Manuel Fal Conde, Tomás Domínguez Arévalo, and other military officers. This rebellion, which was known as the Sanjurjada, was proclaimed in Seville on 10 August 1932. Sanjurjo asserted that the rebellion was only against the current ministry and not against the Republic. It achieved initial success in Seville but absolute failure in Madrid. Sanjurjo attempted to flee to Portugal, but in Huelva he decided to give himself up.

He was condemned to death, a sentence which was later commuted to life imprisonment in the penitentiary of the Dueso. In March 1934 he was granted amnesty by the Lerroux government and went into exile in Estoril, Portugal.

=== Coup ===
Between March and June 1936 Sanjurjo negotiated his leadership of a would-be Carlist-only rising against the Republic. When Niceto Alcalá-Zamora was replaced as President of the Republic by Azaña on 10 May 1936, Sanjurjo joined with Generals Emilio Mola, Francisco Franco and Gonzalo Queipo de Llano in a plot to overthrow the republican government. This led to the Nationalist uprising on 17 July 1936, which started the Spanish Civil War.

Determined to annihilate the Spanish Republic, when he was asked to become the leader of the rebellion by envoy Luis Bolín on 12 July 1936, Sanjurjo declared:

... to make political parties disappear, to sweep from the national spheres every liberal structure and to destroy their system.

== Death ==
On 20 July 1936, Sanjurjo was killed in Estoril in a plane crash, when he tried to fly back to Spain. He chose to fly in a small aircraft (The De Havilland DH.80) piloted by Juan Antonio Ansaldo. One of the main reasons for the crash was the heavy luggage that Sanjurjo insisted on bringing. Ansaldo had warned him that the load was too heavy, but Sanjurjo answered back:

"I need to wear proper clothes as the new caudillo of Spain."

Unaccountably, Sanjurjo chose to fly in Ansaldo's plane rather than a much larger and more suitable airplane that was available. The larger plane was an 8-passenger de Havilland Dragon Rapide, the same one which had transported Franco from the Canary Islands to Morocco. Sanjurjo, however, apparently preferred the drama of flying with a "daring aviator" such as Ansaldo (who himself survived the crash).

When Mola also died in an aircraft accident, Franco was left as the sole effective leader of the Nationalist cause. This led to rumors that Franco had arranged the deaths of his two rivals, but no evidence has ever been produced to support this allegation.

In 2017 the Historical Memory Law was applied by the authorities of Navarre and required that the Sanjurjo's remains be disinterred, over the objections of surviving family, and reburied in the military section of a municipal cemetery in the Spanish city of Melilla—an enclave on the coast of Morocco where Sanjurjo had once been in command. Further controversy ensued when Sanjurjo was buried with military honors in a military Pantheon of Heroes, as confirmed by the army. The government of Navarre received assurances from the Ministry of Defense that special "honors were not offered" and that the remains were received as "just one more soldier".

== In fiction ==
The opening of the alternate history novel by Harry Turtledove, Hitler's War, in his series The War That Came Early, begins with Sanjurjo's flight from Portugal. The point of divergence is that he accepts the pilot's advice and abandons the luggage so the flight is not overloaded and thus arrives safely. His behavior from then on is described as diverging from that of the actual Franco, with Spain taking a less isolated role in World War II and joining the Axis powers.

José Sanjurjo, the beginnings of the Spanish Civil War, and his ill-fated flight are discussed in José Saramago's book The Year of the Death of Ricardo Reis.

== See also ==
- Sanjurjada
- Villa Sanjurjo
- White Terror (Spain)
