= Military reform of Manuel Azaña =

Decrees approved in 1931 by the Provisional Government of the Second Spanish Republic

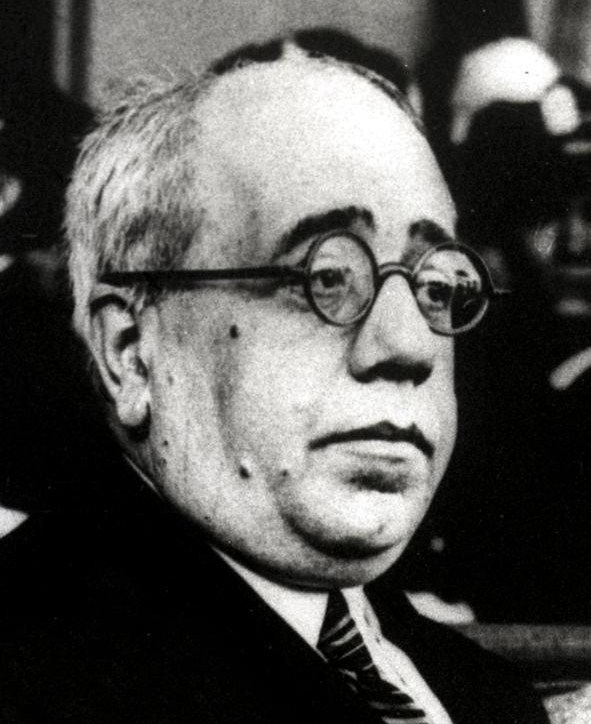
Manuel Azaña

The military reform of Manuel Azaña was the set of decrees approved between April and September 1931 by the Provisional Government of the Second Spanish Republic (which were later recast and endorsed by the Constituent Courts in the so-called "Azaña Law") and the subsequent laws approved by the Courts at the proposal of the Minister of War Manuel Azaña, a position that he held simultaneously with that of President of the Government since October 1931, and whose objective was to modernize and democratize the Spanish Army as well as to put an end to military interventionism in political life. Azaña's reform was the only one of those approved during the first biennium that was not changed by the center-right governments of the second.

When the provisional government was formed, the Ministry of War fell to Manuel Azaña because he was the only member of the "revolutionary committee" who had knowledge of military matters (he had published the first part of a study on the French army) and because he had a clear idea of what had to be done: to reduce the excessive number of officers, a prior step to modernize the army, and to put an end to the "autonomous" power of the military, placing them under the authority of civilian power. It was precisely his outstanding management at the head of this ministry that made him the most prestigious figure in the government and which would finally lead him to preside it after the resignation of Niceto Alcalá-Zamora in October 1931 because of the "religious issue". As Javier Tusell has pointed out, "Azaña knew how to see the opportunities offered by a situation of regime change and had the courage to confront a reform, the military, before which his predecessors in office had retreated".

== Modernization and democratization of the Army ==
Azaña wanted a more modern, professional, efficient and civic army. When he took office at ten o'clock in the evening of the same day, April 14, when the Republic was proclaimed, he addressed the military chiefs present at the Ministry of War, according to what Lieutenant Colonel Felipe Díaz Sandino, who had accompanied him to the Ministry, told years later, "making them aware of the proclamation of the Republic in Spain, its democratic aims, which were based on the maintenance of order and the reestablishment of justice in all the State bodies, and especially in the Army, which he considered to be insufficiently equipped with material; that one of the Government's concerns would be to make it more efficient, reorganizing it and trying to achieve the greatest professional competence, maintaining discipline and removing the military from politics".

Azaña also wanted a more republican army. That is why one of his first decrees, on April 22, obliged the chiefs and officers to promise fidelity to the Republic, with the formula: "I promise on my honor to serve the Republic well and faithfully, to obey its laws and to defend it with arms". Likewise, in line with the secular definition of the State, Azaña suppressed the Army Ecclesiastical Corps made up of military chaplains. He also dissolved the somatén and suppressed the Military Orders. As an argument for the dissolution of the former, it was stated that the Government of the Republic could not "prolong for a moment longer the existence of unduly and tendentiously armed irregular armies which, unnecessary as a support for order, could cause, through misunderstanding or abuse, disturbances of the same".

=== Reduction of the number of officers ===
In 1931 the Spanish Army had 16 divisions to which normally 80 generals would have sufficed, but it had 800, and in addition it had more commanders and captains than sergeants. It had 21,000 chiefs and officers for 118,000 men.

In order to reduce the excessive number of officers (the objective was to achieve a peninsular army of 105,000 soldiers with 7,600 officers and the African contingent would consist of 42,000 soldiers and 1,700 officers), the Provisional Government at the proposal of Azaña approved on April 25, 1931, a decree of extraordinary retirements in which Army officers who so requested were offered the possibility of voluntarily withdrawing from active service with full pay (going to the second reserve —practically retirement—). If the required number of retirements was not reached, the minister reserved the right to dismiss, without any benefit, as many officers as he deemed appropriate. Almost 9,000 commanders (among them 84 generals) availed themselves of the measure, approximately 40% of the officers (the highest percentage of desertions occurred in the higher ranks), therefore, Azaña was then able to undertake the reorganization of the Army. Some historians point out that politically it was a debatable measure because it did not contribute to making the army more republican, since part of the most liberal sector of officers left active service at that time.

According to the balance of Azaña's reform made by Francisco Alía Miranda, the number of generals and assimilated officers went from 190 in 1931 to 90 in 1932, and the number of chiefs and officers was reduced by more than 8,000, from 20,576 to 12,373.

In March 1932 the Cortes passed a law authorizing the Minister of War to transfer to the reserve those generals who had not received any assignment for six months. This was a covert way of getting rid of those generals whose loyalty to the Republic the government doubted. The same law provided that officers who had accepted the retirement established in the decree of May 1931 would lose their pensions if they were found guilty of defamation according to the Law for the Defense of the Republic. This last measure raised a lively debate in the Cortes, as both Miguel Maura and Ángel Ossorio y Gallardo denounced the injustice to which the approximately 5,000 recently retired officers who at any given time criticized the Government could fall victim. Azaña responded that it would be intolerable for the Republic to have to pay its "enemies".

Many years later Generalissimo Francisco Franco privately made the following judgment on Azaña's Retirement Law:

Azaña's Law of Retirements was not badly planned nor was it as bad as it was said at that time; it had the sectarianism of wanting to remove from the ranks of the Army the Officers of monarchist ideals; but this was not realized, since those who wanted to retire did so and we remained the majority.

==== Affected ====
Some of the most relevant military men who made use of the Azaña Law were:

- Francisco Gómez-Jordana Sousa
- Eloy Fernández Navamuel
- Adolfo Prada Vaquero
- Juan Vigón
- Germán Gil y Yuste
- José María Paternina Iturriagagoitia
- Luis Alarcón de la Lastra
- Luis Valdés Cavanilles
- Francisco Zubillaga y Reillo
- Jesús Teijeiro Pérez
- Rafael del Rosal Caro
- Eusebio de Gorbea.

=== Creation of organic divisions and regulation of promotions ===
By a decree of May 25, 1931, the army of the peninsula was reorganized. The number of divisions was reduced from 16 to 8; The captaincy general created by Philip V at the beginning of the 18th century were suppressed (and with them the military regions, administrative divisions of the Monarchy) and were replaced by eight organic divisions, and Military Commanders in the Canary Islands and the Balearic Islands, These were placed under the command of a major general (the highest rank that a military officer could attain since the rank of lieutenant general had been abolished), and on which the machine gun, mountain and hunter units depended (the Air Force became an independent General Corps, with its own officer ranks).

The decree of July 4, 1931, which reorganized the Army of Africa, separated the positions of High Commissioner —commended to a civilian— from that of Superior Chief of the Military Forces of Morocco —assumed by a general and subordinated to the first—.

Another of the issues that Azaña dealt with was the conflictive issue of promotions, promulgating Decrees in May and June which annulled a large part of those produced during the Dictatorship for "war merits", which meant that some 300 military personnel lost one or two ranks, and that others suffered a strong regression in the ranks, as in the case of General Francisco Franco. These decrees were confirmed by the Cortes by a law on Recruiting and Promotions of the Officers of September 12, 1932, which also established a scale for promotions in which professional training was more important than seniority. This law also unified career officers and those coming from the troops in a single scale.

=== Closure of the General Military Academy and creation of the non-commissioned officers corps ===
Azaña also decreed on July 1, 1931, the closure of the General Military Academy (located in Zaragoza and which was closed on July 14, the same day that the Constituent Courts were opened), and which was directed by General Franco. The academy was a creation of the Dictatorship of Primo de Rivera in 1928, as a response to the conflict between the dictator and the Artillery Arm due to the promotion system (the seniority defended by the artillerymen against the "war merits" defended by the "Africanist" military, who were now supported by the dictator). Primo de Rivera tried to put an end to the artillerymen's opposition by dissolving their officer corps and putting an end to the technical training provided by the Segovia academy, where, after five courses, cadets received the titles of Artillery lieutenant and industrial engineer. On the other hand, in the Infantry and Cavalry academies located in Toledo, the cadets only studied for three years and did not receive any civilian degree. Thus, in order to put an end to the "artillery spirit", the dictatorship established a new plan of military studies which consisted of Army cadets studying two years in a new general academy and another two years in their own academy. At the end of the four years, they would be promoted to lieutenants, without titles or civilian ranks. To head the new institution, General Primo de Rivera thought of a military man with a mentality radically opposed to that of the "artillery spirit" (which he considered enlightened, elitist and bureaucratic) and for this purpose he first thought of General Millán Astray, founder of the Legion and a furious "Africanist", but he was advised against his appointment because he was a conflictive character, with enemies in the Army. So he decided to choose General Franco, who had been his second in the Legion. When Azaña closed the Zaragoza Academy, he distributed his students among the academies of the respective arms (Toledo: Infantry, Cavalry and Quartermaster; Segovia: Artillery and Engineers; Madrid: Military Health). In addition, it was established that the cadets of the academies would also study at the universities as a complement to their military training.

The closure of the General Military Academy was one of the most controversial measures of Azaña's military reform, but he considered that the academy under the direction of General Franco had become a center for the diffusion of militaristic ideas of the "Africanist" military and therefore constituted an obstacle to his project of politically neutralizing the Army and placing it under the control of the Cortes and the government, as was the case with the Western European armies —Azaña always used the French army as a professional and civic model—.

On the other hand, in December 1931, the non-commissioned officers corps was created —applicants were required to have a bachelor's degree— with the possibility of joining the officers corps in the Complementary Scale and, in addition, 60% of the places in the military academies were reserved for them. In this way it was intended to democratize the social and ideological base of the Army commands. It was also intended to narrow the professional gap between officers and non-commissioned officers.

=== Creation of the Military Industries Consortium and reduction of compulsory military service. ===
A Law of February 6, 1932 created the Consortium of Military Industries, which grouped together the existing arms and explosives factories in order to centralize and increase their production, and thus supply the Army with more modern material without resorting to foreign purchases, but through the incentive of its own production.

Finally, compulsory military service was reduced to 12 months (four weeks for high school and university students), but the military service quota soldier was maintained, although it could only be applied after six months in the ranks. On the other hand, Azaña dissolved the somatén and suppressed the Military Orders.

=== Pardons, rehabilitations and appointments ===
The government of the Republic pardoned and promoted the military personnel condemned for the two coup attempts to overthrow the Dictatorship of Primo de Rivera and those involved in the Jaca uprising —the shot captains Fermín Galán and Ángel García Hernández were rehabilitated— and in the uprising at the Cuatro Vientos airfield. Thus, General Francisco Aguilera y Egea was promoted in May 1931, shortly before his death, to the rank of Captain General "for the eminent services he has rendered to the cause of freedom"; General Goded was appointed Chief of the Army General Staff; General Gonzalo Queipo de Llano, after his return from exile in France, was appointed head of the First Organic Division with headquarters in Madrid, and Major Ramón Franco, who together with Queipo de Llano had led the uprising at Cuatro Vientos airfield, was appointed director general of Military Aeronautics; finally, General Eduardo López Ochoa was appointed captain general of Catalonia, before its definitive suppression.

== Maintenance of militarized public order ==
In addition to modernizing an obsolete Armed Forces, Azaña intended to "civilize" political life by putting an end to military interventionism by returning the military to the barracks, one of whose fundamental milestones had been the Law of Jurisdictions of 1906 (which during the Monarchy had placed civilians accused of crimes against the Moytherland or the Army under military jurisdiction), and which had become omnipresent after the triumph of General Primo de Rivera's coup d'état in 1923. This second objective began with the repeal of the "Law of Jurisdictions", which was one of the first decisions taken by Azaña, only three days after taking office as Minister of War.

However, the repeal of the Law of Jurisdictions, which President Niceto Alcalá-Zamora described as "an ominous law, which nobody dared to touch up and which we repealed in one stroke and completely" (although in 1906 he, being a liberal monarchist deputy, supported it) and which the decree of annulment called "a strange and disturbing body", did not mean at all that in the Republic the military jurisdiction was no longer used for the maintenance of Public Order without the need to resort to the suspension of constitutional guarantees or to declare a state of exception, and therefore military jurisdiction continued to be applied to civilian individuals for reasons of public order, as had happened during the Monarchy of the Restoration and during the Dictatorship of Primo de Rivera. The military historian and brigadier general of the Air Force José García Rodríguez points out as a serious mistake that the Republicans had not repealed the Constitutive Law of the Army of 1878 —which established as one of its missions the defense "of the external and internal enemies" of the Motherland— replacing it with a new law "adjusted to the Republic" (García Rodríguez recalls that the military rebels in July 1936 used the law of 1878 as an argument to justify their rebellion).

Thus, "the Republican-Socialist governments of the first biennium continued to grant the military important powers over public order and rigid control over society". Military power continued to occupy a large part of the organs of state administration related to public order, from police headquarters, Civil Guard and Assault Guard to the General Directorate of Security (DGS). Many of the generals who led the rebellion of July 1936 had had responsibilities in the administration of the State related to public order, from the police, Guardia Civil and Assault Guard to the Directorate General of Security (DGS). Many of the generals who led the rebellion of July 1936 had had responsibilities in the police administration and in the maintenance of public order: Sanjurjo, Mola, Cabanellas, Queipo de Llano, Muñoz Grandes or Franco.

=== Provisional Government of "full powers" ===
The Decree of May 11, 1931, which delimited the scope of military jurisdiction, maintained that this jurisdiction would continue to hear "military crimes", as defined in the old Code of Military Justice. Given that the Provisional Government, and all the governments of the left and right that followed it, maintained a militarized public order administration, among other things, because the military character of the Civil Guard, the main force of public order, was not changed, this meant that the ordinary justice system had no jurisdiction over its actions and also judged civilians who criticized or obstructed them.

That the Republican-Socialist coalition was aware of the choice it was making is shown by the fact that in the same decree promulgated by a government which had defined itself as having "full powers" (according to the legal Statute of the Provisional Government which it had promulgated the day after taking power) the Sixth Chamber of military justice was created in the Supreme Court (which assumed the competences of the former Supreme Council of War and Navy, which was abolished) made up of four military magistrates and only two civilians. Given the majority of military personnel, this Chamber of the Supreme Court resolved conflicts of competence between the ordinary and military jurisdictions, mostly in favor of the latter (until July 1934 it was the competent chamber to resolve these conflicts, passing from then on to the Second Criminal Chamber, composed of magistrates from the judicial career). The Minister of Justice himself, Álvaro de Albornoz, recognized in November 1932 before the Cortes the extensive scope that had been given to the military criminal jurisdiction, since the reforms made to the Code of Military Justice did not reduce its competencies. For example, the first paragraph of the seventh case of Article 7 of the Code of Military Justice remained as follows:

Article 7.°: By reason of crime, the jurisdiction of War knows the cases that against any person are instructed by.... 7.° Those of attack and contempt to the military authorities and those of insult and slander to them and to the corporations or collectivities of the Army, whatever the means of committing the crime, as long as it refers to the exercise of military assignment or command, tends to undermine its prestige or to relax the bonds of discipline and subordination in the armed organizations.

An order of the Sixth Chamber of October 2, 1931 establishes that: "It corresponds to the War Jurisdiction" in the case of "insult to the Armed Forces" committed by a civilian. Another order of December 1, 1931 states that "the War Jurisdiction is competent to hear offenses directed in his presence to a civil guard, wearing uniform and providing his own service, because it is a military crime", according to articles 7, paragraph four, and 256 of the Code of Military Justice. The orders of October 27 and November 11, 1931, in which the cases of "aggression against the Armed Forces and death produced in repelling it" were elucidated, also pronounced in favor of the jurisdiction of the War Councils to the detriment of the Ordinary Courts. As well as in the order of December 31 on "aggression against the Armed Forces and injuries produced when repelling it", in which the jurisdiction of the War Jurisdiction is maintained "for having committed the crime of article 255 of the Code of Military Justice, and this being more serious than that of the injuries produced to the civilian".

It was the Government itself who at all times firmly instigated that the knowledge of certain allegedly criminal public order actions be referred to military jurisdiction. Thus, the official telegram of the Ministry of the Interior of October 31, 1931, ordered a government delegate that since in the "union meeting" the Civil Guard was alluded to and "since the phrases pronounced by the speaker to which he alludes constitute an insult to the Armed Forces, he should be placed at the disposal of the corresponding jurisdiction".

Thus, as in the Restoration and in the Dictatorship of Primo de Rivera,

the irresponsibility of the members of the militarized police corps is favored by being judge and party in the process and the excesses committed by the police in their interventions in public order... which happened too frequently (...) This implied continuing to place the Army at the center of the political and social conflicts of internal order. (...) [Thus] the reform remained a timid attempt in which only a hint of separation between command and military hierarchy of the organs of military jurisdiction could be glimpsed. However, neither the removal of the captains general as military judicial authority, nor the suppression of the Supreme Council of War and the Navy, nor the dependence of the military prosecutors on the Office of the Attorney General (Ordinary), modify the system of guarantees that all judicial bodies must provide, nor can they be considered truly judicial bodies. The courts-martial, their composition, as well as the procedure, remain intact. All this does not detract from the power of the military over the civilian element and over its internal political and social actions, thus maintaining the Army in the role of superior arbiter of these internal conflicts.

== Approval of the Constitution of 1931 ==
The 1931 Constitution did not modify the extensive scope of military jurisdiction maintained during the Government of "full powers" since the final wording of article 96 maintained within its competence "military crimes" and "the services of arms and the discipline of all armed institutes", the latter concept encompassing not only the Armed Forces "defending the national territory", but also the forces in charge "only of maintaining Public Order" (Civil Guard, Carabineros and any other possible new militarized corps). This was in contradiction with the regulations of other democratic European countries, such as Germany, in whose Constitution the "military courts" only acted in "wartime" or in France, a case that had been studied by Azaña, where the courts martial were presided over by a civilian magistrate and military jurisdiction was limited in peacetime to military crimes committed "only" by military personnel.

Consequently, the extension of military jurisdiction in the Republic was a fact, even including the crimes foreseen in the "monstrous" Law of Jurisdictions of 1906, formally repealed, that is, the competence of the courts-martial to prosecute countrymen who had expressed criticism of the Armed Forces, specifically by means of the press, which were presumed to be criminal. Thus, the Sixth Chamber of the Supreme Court repeatedly declared the competence of military jurisdiction in cases of "offenses against the Civil Guard by means of printing" (orders of November 21 and December 29, 1931, and also in the orders of April 21 and 29, 1932).

The attempts of the Minister of Justice Alvaro de Albornoz to limit military jurisdiction always met with the refusal of Manuel Azaña, President of the Government and Minister of War. The Supreme Court reiterated its doctrine in the order of June 30, 1932, in which it declared that "offenses against the Civil Guard by means of printing" were within the jurisdiction of military jurisdiction. In another order, the Supreme Court of April 25, 1933, declared the competence of military jurisdiction in the case of "offenses against the Army in a letter addressed to the Minister of War" and in the order of December 9, 1932, for "shouts against the Civil Guard".

Thus, many of the actions carried out by civilian citizens which had transcendence in the public order would be tried by courts martial, as well as a good part of the activity of the Police. The Supreme Court declares that in the "aggression against the Armed Forces, the war jurisdiction is competent even if it is for political or social purposes (A. of August 4, 1932). "In mistreatment of a detainee by the Civil Guard, war jurisdiction is competent" (A. of October 25, 1932). "In excesses of the Armed Forces, the military jurisdiction is competent" (A. of December 25, 1932). The Supreme Court also declared the competence of military jurisdiction in the following orders: "Death (of a civilian) produced by the Civil Guard in the line of duty" (A. of January 8, 1933); "public disorder and aggression against the Armed Forces who come to repress it", the military jurisdiction is competent to hear the second (A. of March 9, 1933); "insult to the Armed Forces. Offensive phrases of a civilian uttered against a lieutenant of the Guardia Civil in the act of arresting him", the war jurisdiction is competent (A. of April 29, 1933); "injuries caused by the Guardia Civil in the act of service" (A. of June 2, 1)33); "homicide committed by the Armed Forces in the act of service" (A. of August 18, 1933); "aggression committed by civilians on the persons of two officers in the performance of their duties" (A. of 29 September 1933); "aggression on a squaddie in the line of duty" (A. of 6 October 1)33); "homicide committed by a civil guard in the line of duty" (A. of 18 October 1933); "crime committed by the Civil Guard, or of which he is the victim, in the line of duty" (A. of 20 October 1933). 355-356 Also the Criminal Chamber of the Supreme Court, resolving an appeal, grants jurisdiction to the military jurisdiction for the case of "aggression against the Armed Forces and homicide committed by the latter to repel that of which it was the object... the latter carried out while on armed duty, which is what the Civil Guards were doing on the occasion of the case" (sentence of February 13, 1933).

This militarized treatment of public order occurred, for example, on the occasion of the anarchist insurrection of January 1933, during which in Pedralba (Valencia) the Civil Guard intervened and caused the death of ten civilians, after the death of a member of that corps and two assault guards. The Council of Ministers resolved that "most of those arrested in this plot were subject, given the nature of the crime, to military jurisdiction and would have to be judged by it". The most serious events and of greater repercussion in the public opinion are those that take place in Casas Viejas in January 1933. The defendants in an earlier anarchist insurrection, that of Alto Llobregat in January 1932, were tried on July 25, 1933, in a court martial held in Tarrasa where 42 defendants were sentenced to sentences of up to 20 years. As the socialist Vidarte pointed out:

Although it may seem strange, the Code of Military Justice was not modified and in all the clashes that took place between the people and the Civil Guard, the courts martial continued to intervene.

== Rejection of the right wing and of part of the Army ==
Azaña's military reform was harshly opposed by a sector of the officers, by the conservative political media and by the military organs of expression La Correspondencia Militar and Ejército y Armada. Manuel Azaña was accused of wanting to "crush" the Army. The phrase was taken from a speech delivered by Azaña on June 7 in Valencia in which, referring to the municipal control by the caciques, he said that "if I ever have any participation in this kind of matters, I have to crush, I have to uproot this organization with the same energy, with the same resolution, without losing my serenity, that I have put into undoing other things no less threatening to the Republic".

One of the reforms that some officers criticized the most was the closure of the General Academy of Zaragoza, a decision they interpreted as a blow to the esprit de corps of the Army, since it was the only institution where officers of the different arms were trained together. They also protested when a law of September 1932 obliged candidates to enter the officer academies to serve in the army for six months and to follow a certain number of short courses at a university.

An example of the displeasure of a part of the military with the "Azaña Law" and with the criticism against the actions of the army and the Civil Guard in matters of public order were the incidents which took place on the occasion of a military review of the Madrid garrison which took place in Carabanchel. When at the closing of the event General Villegas, who was the head of the I Organic Division, shouted "Long live Spain!" Colonel Julio Mangada then shouted, which was an act of insubordination, "Long live the Republic!". For this he was arrested and court-martialed, but the government in turn dismissed General Villegas and accepted the resignation of General Goded, Chief of the General Staff, also present at the event and who disagreed with the decision (he was replaced by General Masquelet). In the whole incident there was nothing but words, but the "Long live Spain!" already symbolized one kind of loyalties and "Long live the Republic!" another (Generals Goded and Villegas were among those who rose up in July 1936 and Colonel Mangada fought for the Republic, as did General Masquelet).

The attempted coup d'état led by General Sanjurjo, in August 1932, was an exponent of the uneasiness of a part of the Army for reasons that were not strictly political. The very strong campaign unleashed by the conservative media against the reform, personalized in the figure of Azaña, also contributed to turn the Prime Minister into the real bête noire of many military men.

== Evaluation ==
In a speech in the Republican Cortes, the philosopher José Ortega y Gasset described "the radical reform of the Army" carried out by Azaña as "marvelous and incredible, fabulous [and] legendary" "without the Spanish people having been well aware of it until now". He emphasized that it had been achieved "without serious friction, with correctness on the part of the Minister of War and on the part of the military, who have facilitated the achievement of this magnificent project" and asked for the applause of the Chamber for the Minister of War and for the Army, "the one who has gone and the one who has stayed", which was answered by a long ovation from the deputies to Azaña. The latter wrote in his diary of July 30, 1931: "Without taking off my lips I have had "a parliamentary triumph"". For his part, the socialist Juan Simeón Vidarte, many years after the end of the Civil War, harshly criticized the fact that Azaña had not wanted to "form a Republican Army", arguing "that the first duty of the Republic was to form an Army based on authentically republican chiefs and officers and not to allow many hundreds of these to leave active service because they considered themselves to have been left behind".

For historian Julio Gil Pecharromán, "Azaña, not exempt of political arrogance, did little to defend his project before public opinion and his verbal outbursts, which led him to be branded as a 'Jacobin', contributed to create grievances that weighed on the anti-regime attitude of many military men. (...) [However] Azaña's reform has been positively valued since, as a whole, it constituted a realistic and coherent plan, which would have provided Spain with an Army in accordance with its needs".

Despite the fact that this reform was considered necessary even by the military establishment, due to the oversizing of the army, in addition to the obsoleteness of its material, structure and preparation, Azaña's lack of tact with the military triggered the animosity of an important sector of them towards the reforms, and therefore, towards the Republic.

According to historian Francisco Alía Miranda, "Manuel Azaña intended to return political life to civilian society and return the military to the barracks. He did not succeed. The military continued to have a great importance in politics and in the budget... Despite Azaña's efforts, military power ended up being decisive in the effective control of public order, thus preventing the longed-for strengthening of civilian power, a sign of the structural weakness of the republican state. Republican politicians proved incapable of adapting the administration of public order to the principles of a democratic regime and resorted to the same instruments of the monarchy to achieve social pacification: state of war and troops in the streets, ingredients that perpetuated the prominence of the Army".

== See also ==
- Spanish Republican Armed Forces
- Spanish Legion
- Army of Africa (Spain)

== Bibliography ==
- Alía Miranda, Francisco (2018). Historia del Ejército español y de su intervención política (in Spanish). Madrid: Los Libros de la Catarata. ISBN 978-84-9097-459-9.
- Alpert, Michael (1982). La reforma militar de Azaña (1931-1933) (in Spanish). Siglo XXI de España. ISBN 843230445X.
- Ballbé, Manuel (1983). Orden público y militarismo en la España constitucional (1812-1983) (in Spanish). Madrid: Alianza Editorial. p. 318. ISBN 84-206-2378-4.
- Casanova, Julián (2007). República y Guerra Civil. Vol. 8 de la Historia de España, dirigida por Josep Fontana y Ramón Villares (in Spanish). Barcelona: Crítica/Marcial Pons. ISBN 978-84-8432-878-0.
- García Rodríguez, José (2013). Conspiración para la Rebelióm militar del 18 de julio de 1936 (del 16 de febrero al 17 de julio) (in Spanish). Madrid: Sílex. ISBN 978-84-7737-748-1.
- Gil Pecharromán, Julio (1997). La Segunda República. Esperanzas y frustraciones (in Spanish). Madrid: Historia 16. ISBN 84-7679-319-7.
- Jackson, Gabriel (1976) [1965]. La República Española y la Guerra Civil, 1931-1939 [The Spanish Republic and the Civil War, 1931-1939.] (in Spanish) (2nd ed.). Barcelona: Crítica. ISBN 84-7423-006-3.
- Tusell, Javier (1997). Historia de España. Vol. XII. La Segunda República. De la Segunda República a la Guerra Civil (in Spanish). Madrid: Espasa-Calpe. ISBN 84-239-8960-7.
