= Sanjurjada =

Spanish military coup

- Part of the interwar period
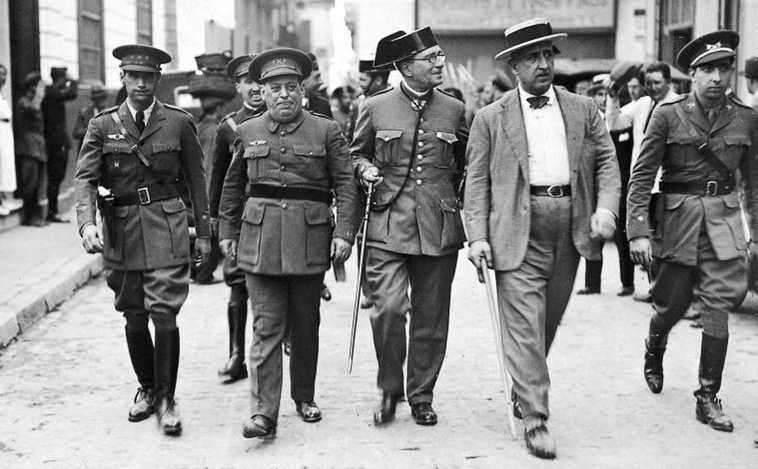
- José Sanjurjo in Seville, August 10, 1932
Date	10–11 August 1932
Location	Madrid, Seville, Spain
Result	Spanish government victory

Belligerents
Government forces	Rebel forces

Commanders and leaders
Manuel Azaña	José Sanjurjo; Emilio Barrera; Manuel Fal Conde

Strength
Most of the army	Seville garrison, some 300 people in Madrid

Political support
Most centre-republican parties and some left-wing parties	Some monarchist and centre-republican politicians

Casualties and losses
5 wounded	10 killed 8 wounded

Sanjurjada (Spanish: [saŋxuɾˈxaða]) was a military coup staged in Spain on August 10, 1932. It was aimed at toppling the government but not necessarily at toppling the Spanish Republic. Following brief clashes it was easily suppressed in Madrid. Hardly any action was recorded elsewhere except Seville, where local rebel commander general José Sanjurjo took control for some 24 hours but acknowledged defeat when faced with resolute governmental response. Due to his brief success and attention given during following trials, the entire coup was later named after him.

== Background ==
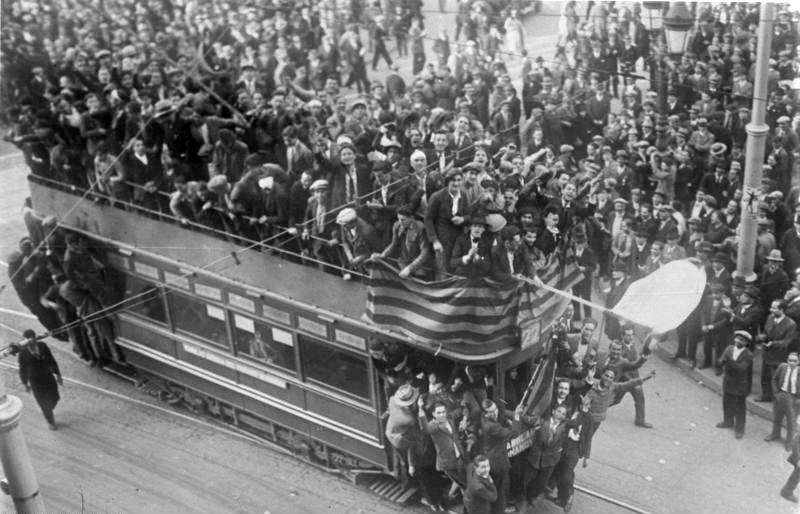
Republic declared, 1931

The Spanish military greeted the advent of the Republic with ambivalence. The officer corps was generally made up of conservative monarchists, but following the tumultuous last years of Primo de Rivera’s military dictatorship, which had compromised and discredited the army, most military men preferred to stay clear of politics. It was only when the new regime was set on a firmly leftward course and started to target the army for serious reform that voices of dissent started to be heard. A series of reforms, introduced since 1931 by the Prime Minister and the minister of war at the same time, Manuel Azaña, was aimed at scaling down an overgrown officer corps, structural reform and bringing the armed forces firmly under the civilian control. This, combined with Azaña's patronising, if not contemptuous, rhetoric, proved fertile soil for growth of corporative disenchantment. The government confronted the dissent with few arrests, a number of personal reassignments and a handful of new regulations, which tightened its grip on the army further on.

There is little indication that growing opposition among some of the generals was fuelled by ongoing political controversies, especially the problems of agrarian reform, relations between state and church, re-defining labor regulations and ambitions of peripheral nationalisms. It was rather politicians who attempted to bank on frustration of the military, some of them second-rank Alfonsist monarchists, some of them Republicans and some of them Carlists. A contemporary scholar distinguished between 3 different lobbying groups pursuing 3 paths: a "constitutional" revolt aimed at installing a new less radical regime, a coup leading to monarchist restoration and a technical "rectification" of the Republic, equidistant between the former two. Another author suggests there were 2 strands, an Alfonsist one and a "constitutionalist" one, though initially all that was rather secondary to generally corporative nature of the growing dissatisfaction.

== Conspiracy and counter-action ==
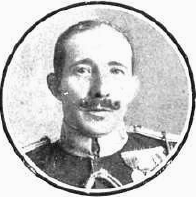
Emilio Barrera

Since the late 1931 a number of officers have been discussing a possible coup. The talks, carried out in private and in public, until the early summer of 1932 were a loose sequence of meetings. The conspirators holding highest positions were chief of staff Manuel Goded and head of Carabineros, José Sanjurjo; others commanded field units or garrisons, like generals Emilio Fernández Pérez, Miguel Ponte, Manuel González Carrasco, José Fernández de Villa-Abrille, Rafael Villegas and José González y Fernández. The remaining plotters were retired generals José Cavalcanti and Emilio Barrera, some lower-rank officers, a handful of second-rate politicians, chiefly Manuel Burgos y Mazo, and possibly few industrial tycoons. Stanley Payne estimates that only around 5% of the officer corps supported the coup.

A number of political heavyweights were at least aware of the conspiracy but assumed an ambiguous stand, the key ones having been Alejandro Lerroux and Melquíades Alvares. Some, also aware, have clearly refused to take part but took no action against the conspirators. The emerging centre-right leader José María Gil Robles rejected the scheme from the onset and the official Carlist executive withdrew from initial informal talks about requetés taking part, though some Carlists individually pledged support. The conspiracy climaxed in a meeting of August 8 in Madrid, when final decision to act was taken.

Due to rather loose discipline among the conspirators their talks became sort of a public secret; the government was aware of the conspiracy also thanks to a well developed network of informers. Prime Minister Azaña judged that the plotters lacked extensive backing and that instead of mounting a pre-emptive strike, he would be better off allowing the coup to unfold, effectively setting up a trap. Apart from ensuring that loyal commanders were on alert and loyal units were stationed near key points, in late July he relieved a number of high-command officers, some of them conspiracy members, following the Carabanchel incident. Goded resigned himself in act of solidarity, replaced by a new fully loyal chief of staff. On August 9 Azaña was already fully informed about the decision taken the previous day by the plotters; he forewarned generals in provincial capitals, e.g. in Zaragoza, Barcelona, and Cadiz, and made sure loyal security units were located near the Ministry of War.

== Rebel plan ==
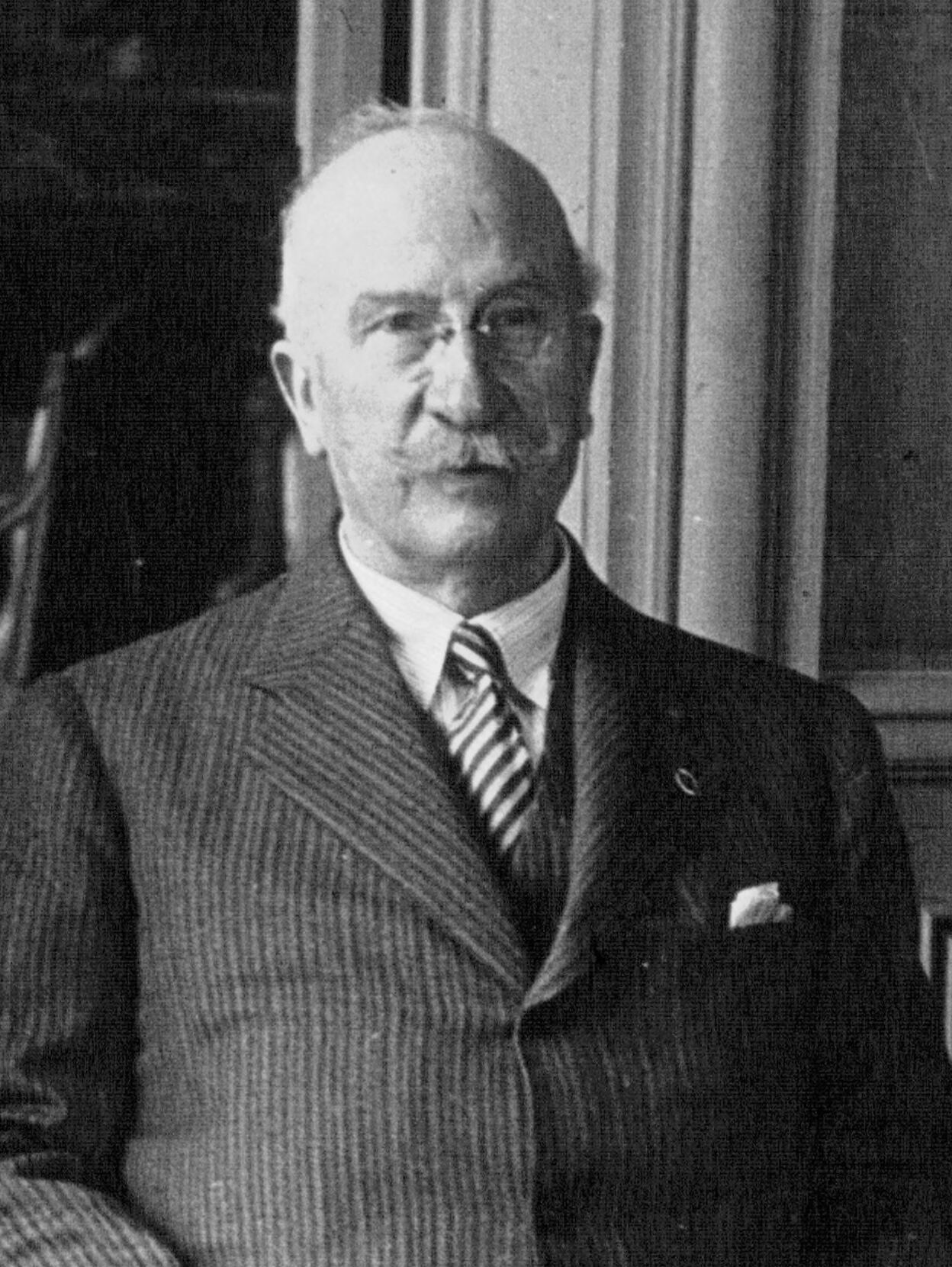
Alejandro Lerroux

The rebel plan relied on decisive action of few determined officers in some key garrisons; Barrera would act as the supreme military authority. In Madrid, conspirators counted on two infantry regiments, two cavalry regiments, smaller auxiliary units and one tercio of Guardia Civil. Detached sub-units were supposed to take control of the Ministry of War building, declare state of war and move on to seize other key spots in the capital. At the same time, other military conspirators were tasked with taking control of a number of provincial garrisons, the key ones in Seville, Pamplona, Valladolid, Granada and Cádiz; in case of a stalemate in Madrid, they were supposed to send rebel reinforcements to the capital. The rebels did not expect major opposition; they assumed the government would give in, militant workers would be overwhelmed before they could take action and most of the army would remain passive. There was little if any bloodshed anticipated. Though some military thought the plan an outdated 19th-century-style pronunciamiento, others considered prestige of some participants, especially Sanjurjo and Barrera, sufficient to win the army.

In April 1932 the conspirators sought support from the Fascist Italy, and their envoy Juan Ansaldo spoke with Italo Balbo. Little is known about outcome of these talks; some authors claim Ansaldo was promised 200 machine-guns and some suggest that a shipment from Italy might have been already sent; confirmed or not, no foreign impact on the future developments has been proven.

Political vision of the conspirators is extremely unclear. Among many conflicts emerging during the planning phase, the key one was that between the monarchists and the republicans, the former headed by Barrera and the latter by Goded. The republicans seemed to prevail; most of the conspirators envisioned the coup as aiming to topple the government, not the Republic. A vague practical compromise was agreed; following the victorious coup Barrera would create a committee assuming supreme power, headed by himself with Cavalcanti and Fernandez Perez forming part; their task was to restore public order. What would happen next is not clear. According to some scholars, the conspirators planned to replace the Azaña cabinet with a government headed by a politician considered more moderate, most likely Lerroux. According to the others, provisional military authority was supposed to organize elections to Cortes Constituentes; this in turn might or might not lead to a monarchical restoration.

== Coup in Madrid ==
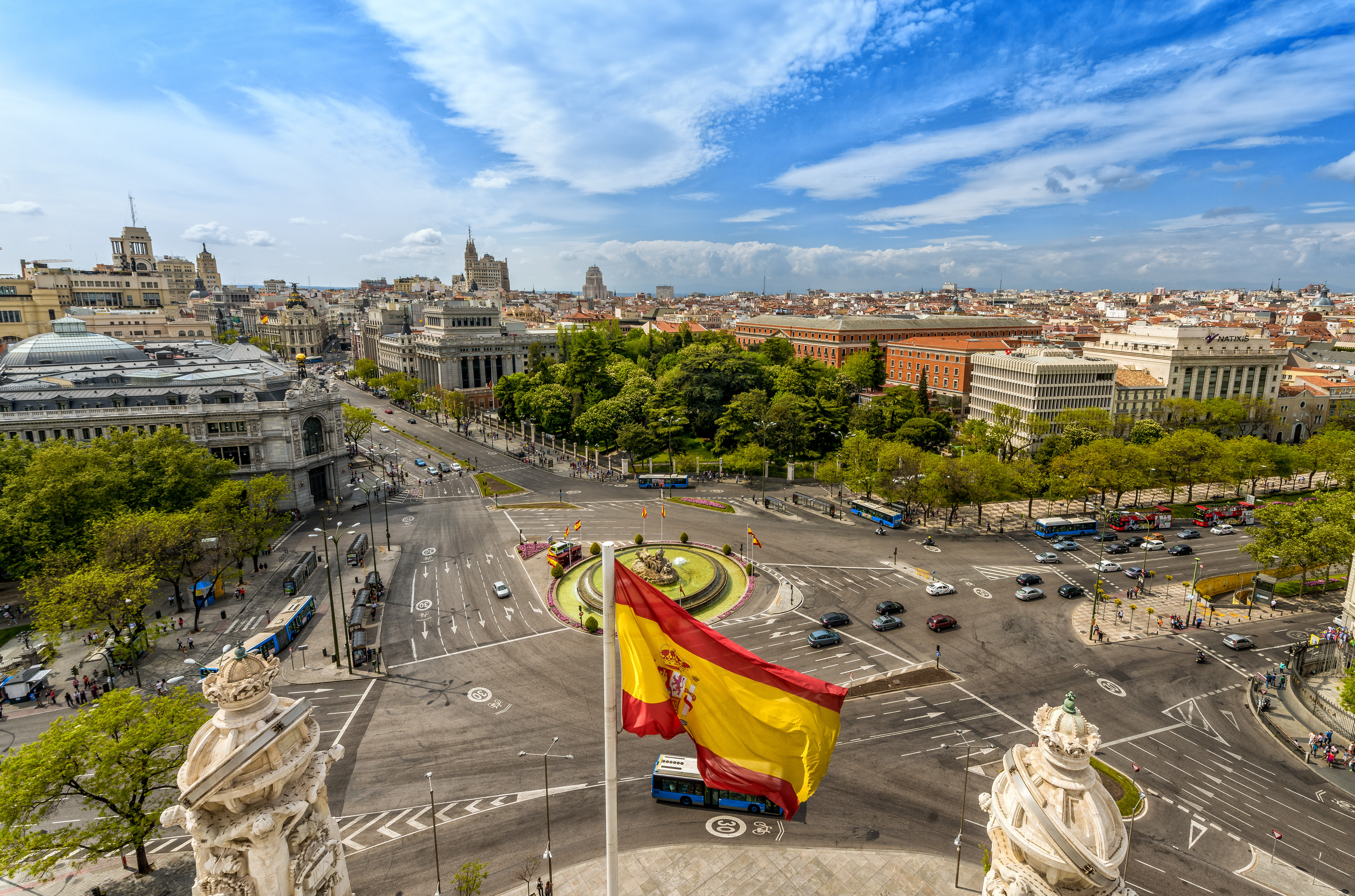
Cibeles, key battlefield of the coup. Ministry is the reddish building back-right

The conspirators were aware of the sketchy nature of their plan, but they feared that delay would lead to arrests and decimate the command structure; the moment of rebellion was set at 4 AM, August 10, 1932. During the night Barrera, Cavalcanti and Fernandez Perez placed themselves in one of the buildings next to the Ministry of War. Despite the plan, no organized military sub-unit showed up in the very early morning hours in the neighborhood; instead, rather loose groups of some 100 officers and civilians attempted to enter the building using the back entrance at calle de Prim. They were fired at by the sentries, suffered first losses and started to withdraw. Another, smaller group of equally disorganized rebels entered the nearby Palacio de Comunicaciones hoping to take command of Guardia Civil stationed there, but some were taken prisoner and the others withdrew.

None of the infantry and cavalry regiments supposed to rise did. The only sub-unit which rose to arms was Depósito de Remonta; its company with some 70 soldiers commanded by colonel Martinez de Baños marched out from the barracks towards Paseo de la Castellana, where they met insurgents withdrawing from earlier failed attempts; the group grew to some 300 men. At that time, colonel Juan Hernández and captain Arturo Menéndez, commanding from the ministry building, managed to deploy Guardia Civil and Guardia de Asalto units on defensive positions around Plaza de Cibeles before the rebels marched in. The shootout lasted around 30 minutes before loyalist units outflanked the rebels and started to advance from other neighboring streets. At this point the rebels acknowledged defeat; some started to flee, some were wounded and most of them surrendered. Azaña watched the events unfold from the upper floor of the ministry; by 8 AM the coup in Madrid was over.

Undetected, Barrera, Cavalcanti and Fernandez Perez left their hideout. As was initially agreed in case of failure, Barrera took a prepared plane to Pamplona. Since the city remained calm he made it to Biarritz seeking a long-distance aircraft which would take him to Seville, but having failed he returned to Pamplona and flew back to Madrid, where he spent the night. Informed that Sanjurjo had been detained he dismissed the news as false and flew to Seville, due to lack of fuel landing on an improvised airfield. As his pilot managed to get petrol, on August 12 Barrera flew back to Madrid and, disguised, made it to France by way of cars and buses.

== Coup in the provinces ==
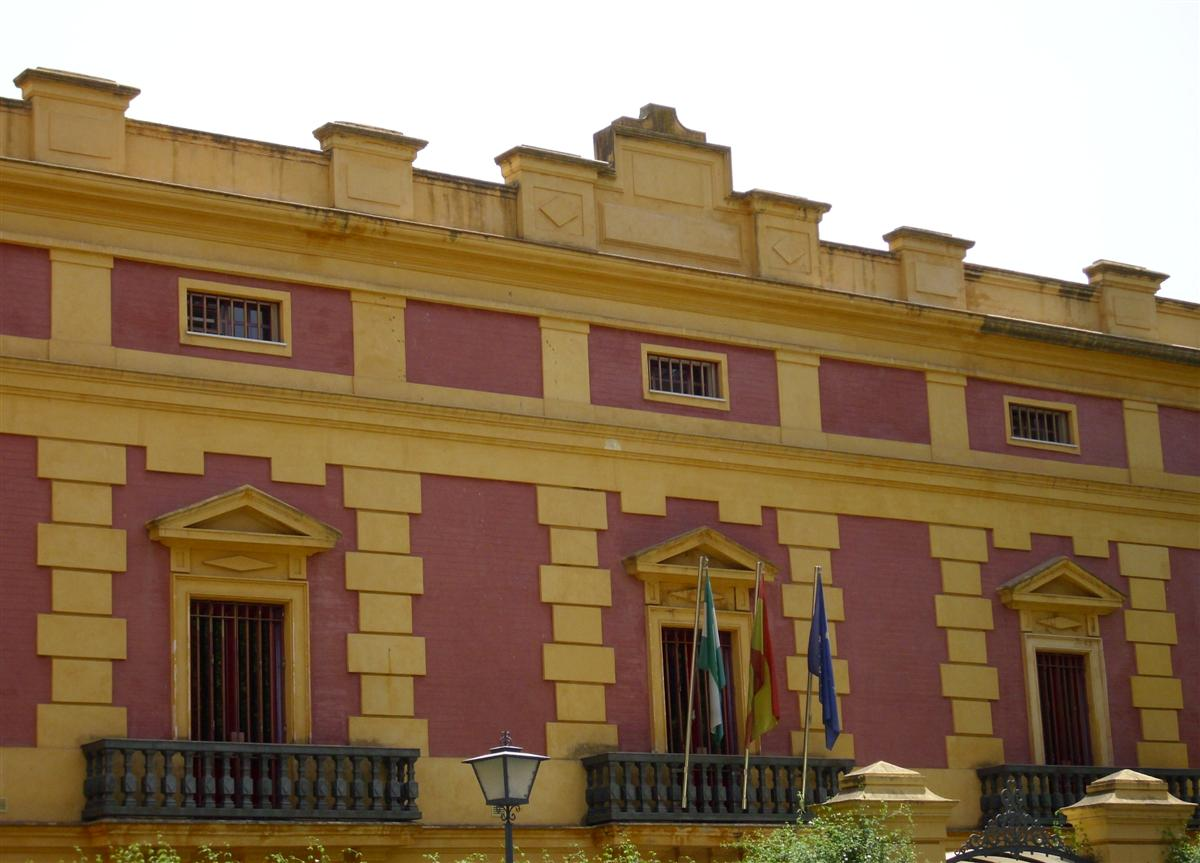
Capitania General, Plaza de la Gavidia, Seville (present view)

In almost none of the provincial garrisons there was any rebellious action recorded. One of the reasons was that the decision to rise did not reach some local conspirators; also, many of them remained vacillating and in fact preferred to join the already successful action than to take the risk of initiating the insurgency. The key reason, however, was that the conspiracy network in provincial capitals was skimpy and that the government took appropriate precautionary steps. On August 9 Azaña alerted all trusted provincial commanders about the forthcoming coup, resulting in extra measures undertaken to ensure nothing unexpected happens. As a result, even the officers determined to act found it semi-suicidal to commence rebellion.

The only major urban centre in Spain where the coup triumphed was Seville. It was Sanjurjo appointed to lead the rebels in the city and back in July he established his operational network in the garrison. Having left Madrid in the afternoon of August 9, he arrived in Seville around 5 AM on August 10. Having set his provisional headquarters at a private estate, he sent envoys to both civil governor and military commander, demanding compliance. There are conflicting accounts on their position: according to some they refused, according to the others they assumed an ambiguous stand.

Faced with a possible stalemate, Sanjurjo decided to act. He showed up at Plaza de España, acclaimed by local Guardia Civil; his aide, García de la Herrán, did the same in the Zapateros barracks. From that moment most units in the city adhered to the coup; colonel Puigdendolas, the most determined of the loyalists, was disarmed before he could take action. With no opposition, Sanjurjo moved his command post to Capitania General building at Plaza de la Gavidia, declared state of war, gave press interviews, issued a manifesto and started appointing new civil and military authorities in the province. At 10 AM he was in full control, aware of the Madrid failure but unclear about other provincial capitals. He was also aware that the rebels seized control in Jerez de la Frontera, a city in the neighboring province of Cádiz; the local Guardia Civil commander Pedro Romero Basart was an oldtime Sanjurjo acquaintance.

== Sanjurjo ruling ==
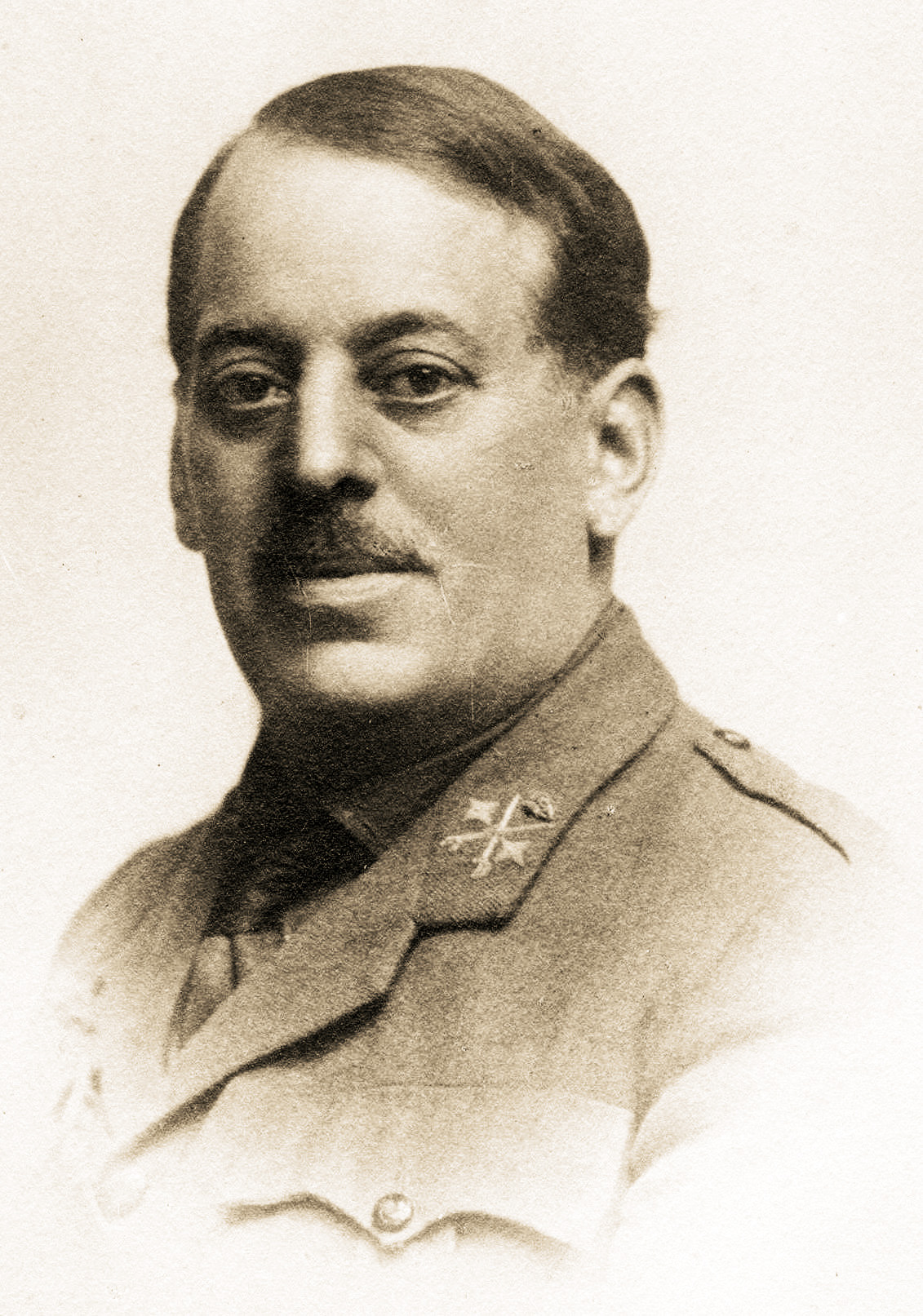
General Sanjurjo

The rebel control of Seville lasted no longer than 24 hours and hence, it is hardly possible to tell how their rule would unfold. However, Sanjurjo took some measures which allow a glimpse into his vision of the future Spain and which are at times referred to when judging political leaning of the rebels and their actual or would-be social basis.

In the morning of August 10 he issued a manifesto, the only public statement of the rebels. It was edited by Juan Pujol and allegedly modeled on the manifesto prepared by the Republican rebels in the Jaca uprising in 1930. Grandiose and verbose in terms of style but enigmatic and vague in terms of contents, it lambasted the regime as based on social injustice and unlawful despotism, producing nothing but suffering and misery of the millions. In veiled language it made references to autonomous regulations as to assault on integrity of Spain, and to street violence as to chaos and the rule of criminals. Claiming responsibility for the country, the document pledged loyalty to the Republican system, but declared Cortes illegal from the very onset. It pledged to restore order, tranquility and social justice by means of discipline and the rule of law; it declared formation of a provisional governing Junta, which would hand over power to a new, legitimate parliament elected by the people. The document contained not a single reference either to monarchy or to religion.

Sanjurjo dismissed both the civil governor and the military commander; he conducted talks with local established conservative politicians, either related to Acción Popular or to defunct Unión Patriótica, some of them landholders, former diputación dignitaries and monarchists. However, he seemed to have most trust in the Carlists; Cristóbal González de Aguilar was nominated the new civil governor while others were appointed either to ayuntamiento or to some military positions, both in the city or in the controlled areas. No systematic repressive action was organized, though in the afternoon mounted police was sent to disperse the proletarian crowd, heading for the ayuntamiento and shouting "death to Sanjurjo!".

== Defeat ==
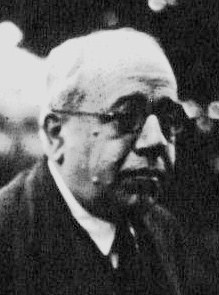
Prime Minister Azaña

Though the government lost control in Seville, Azaña and his staff were determined to regain it. Two regiments of infantry and further artillery units, all led by trusted commanders, were assembled in Madrid. In the early afternoon of August 10 they were loaded onto trains and departed towards the Andalusian capital. Further 2 battalions were concentrated in Ceuta, 2 tabores of regulares were swiftly brought from Africa to Cadiz and an aviation bombing unit was relocated from Barcelona to Cartagena. Commanders of neighboring garrisons, Cádiz in particular, issued orders to prepare for combat. In the evening first loyalist units started to deploy South of Seville and the city trade unions declared general strike.

In the late afternoon Sanjurjo was already aware that the coup failed not only in Madrid but also in all other provincial garrisons; he also learnt about government units heading towards Seville. Despite the news, he seemed determined to fight off the loyalists. Due to his decisive and valiant stand during Moroccan wars nicknamed "Lion of the Rif", he issued first engagement orders. However, as the night was getting late he started to realize that isolated and with government apparently determined to act, his position was getting very difficult.

Around 1 AM on August 11, two of his high commanding officers informed Sanjurjo that given the circumstances, they were not prepared to engage in what looked like a forthcoming fratricidal battle. According to one author he declared leaving to ensure compliance of the Huelva garrison, according to another he conceded defeat and released his subordinates from all obligations. Soon afterwards, having boarded a car with his son and his ADC colonel Esteban-Infantes, they left Westbound. All three, suspected of fleeing to Portugal, were detained near Huelva around 4:30 AM. During the early morning hours of August 11 the rebel troops in Seville surrendered. Just like the previous morning, when Sanjurjo was taking over the city, no shot was fired and no casualty was recorded.

== Result and aftermath ==
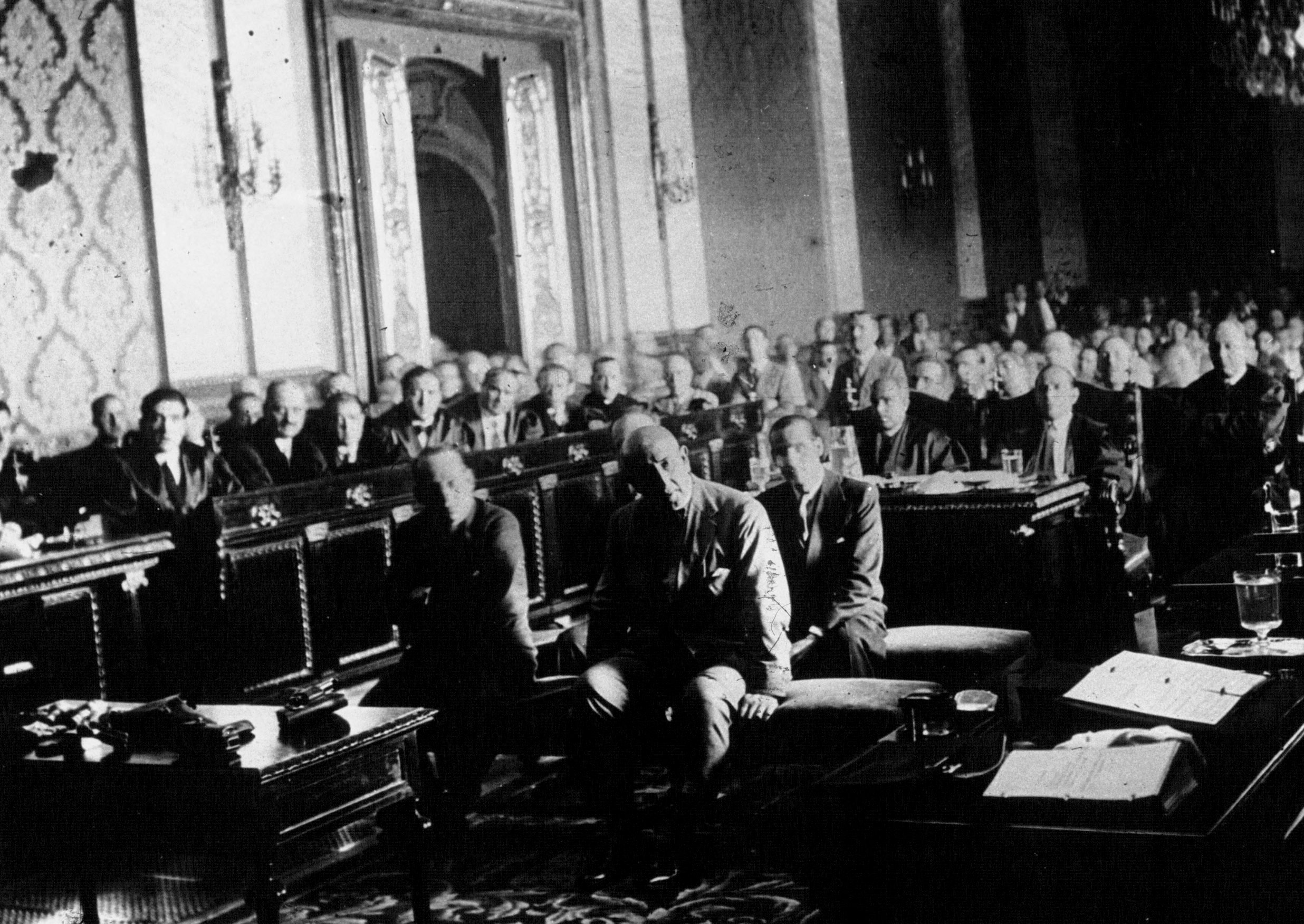
Sanjurjo on trial

Compared to other instances of violent anti-government insurgency of the Second Republic the coup did not produce massive bloodshed, first because the government monitored the plot and contained insurgency before it could unfold, but also because Sanjurjo, the only rebel commanding significant troops, stepped back when faced with the perspective of a civil war. The total number of fatal casualties is usually given as around 10, all of them result of the Madrid clashes: some sources claim 2 officers and 7 soldiers, others count in also 2 rebel civilians. An unclear number of wounded, probably around 20–30, was recorded. As no artillery was used, there were no major damages.

Key conspirators captured were trialed: Esteban-Infantes was sentenced to 12 years in prison, Garcia de Herrán to lifetime incarceration and Sanjurjo received death penalty, soon commuted to life imprisonment. Since the Republican legal system did not allow trials in absentia, leaders who fled Spain, including Barrera, were effectively barred from re-entering the country and condemned to exile. Some 200 officers were brought to trial; ultimately 144 of them, plus some civilians, were deported to the Spanish Saharan military prison outpost in Villa Cisneros, few released as late as the fall of 1933. Around 300 officers considered accomplices not involved were stripped of command.

382 families deemed involved in the coup were expropriated; since almost all were landholders, their former estates became subject to agrarian reform. Taking advantage of administrative measures available under the Republican law, provincial civil governors detained some 5,000 people for few days or at most few weeks. The government took advantage of the coup to crack down on most centers of perceived anti-Republican activity, either involved in the conspiracy or not: some 130 newspapers were closed, usually temporarily, and most premises belonging to parties and organizations deemed involved were shut down.

Azaña made sure that Guardia de Asalto was a reliable and loyal republican guard; the formation was further expanded to 10,000. On the other hand, it was decided to decrease the powers of Minister of War and split control over other armed uniformed branches: Carabineros, formation serving mostly as border guards and uninvolved in the coup, but since February 1932 headed by Sanjurjo, were moved to the Ministry of Finance and similarly, Guardia Civil were transferred to the Ministry of Interior.

== Long-term impact ==
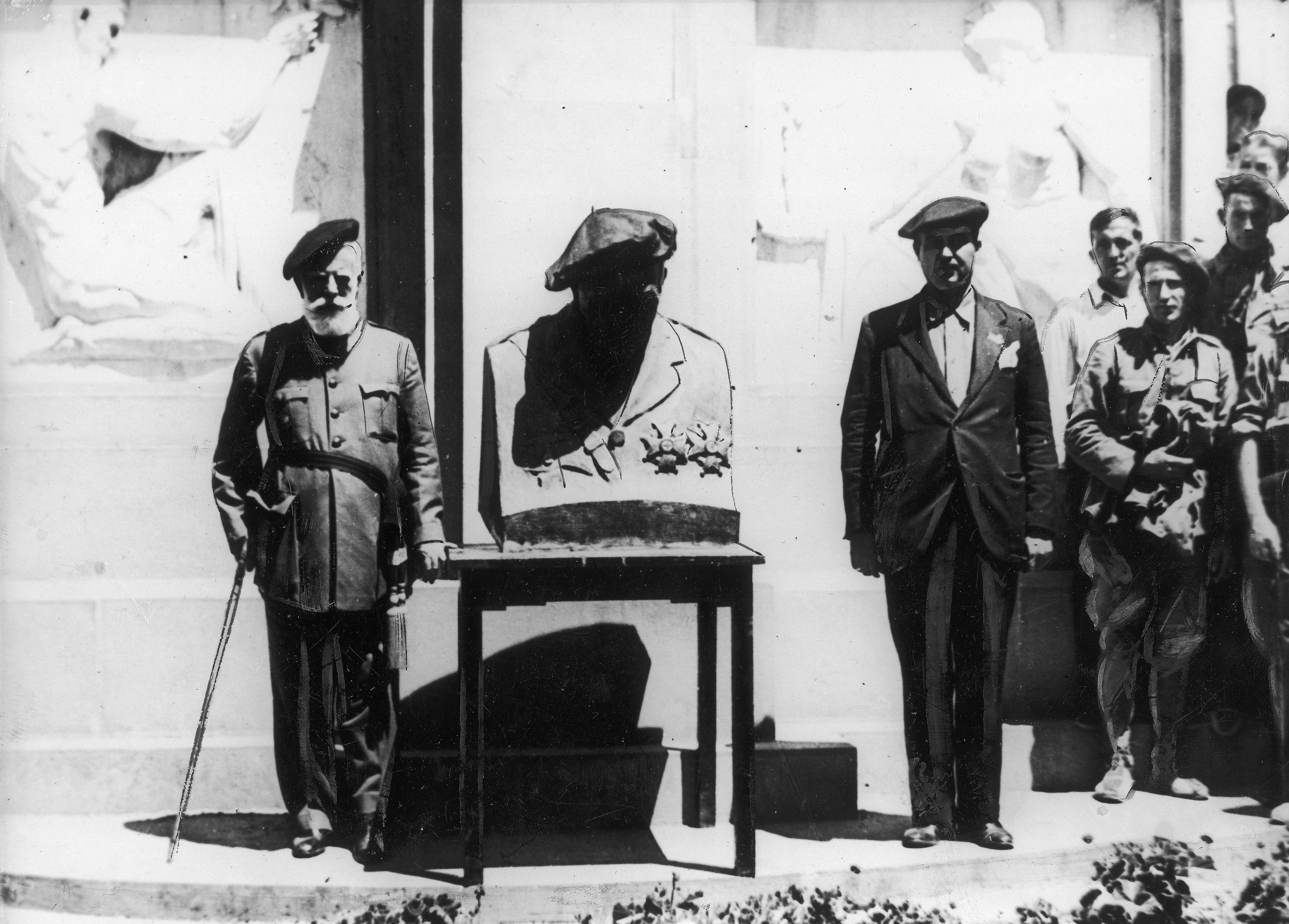
Unveiling the bust of Sanjurjo (Pamplona, 1936)

Though the coup failed, its outcome significantly contributed to the future sequence of events. Perhaps its most important result was further radicalization of the Left; ensured that reaction would never come to terms with the Republican regime, their propaganda embraced increasingly sectarian tone and spurred belligerency of the party militias. Amnesty to those involved in Sanjurjada became key program of the Right during the 1933 elections, leading to further, bi-polar division of political scene.

Azaña rested in his disdainful confidence that the military were pathetic failures, which would lead to his complacency and self-assurance in the spring of 1936. Future conspirators concluded that any action should not rely on retired or off-duty generals but must be organized by officers holding key command positions, as indeed would be the case 4 years later. As the coup was about military rebels having been defeated by military loyalists, would-be future plotters overfocused on the army; they disregarded potential for popular resistance, which in 1936 would prove decisive in opposing the insurgents. For Gil-Robles Sanjurjada demonstrated utter nonsense of violent means and reinforced penchant for constitutional path, pursued later by CEDA. Own successful decisiveness when repelling the rebels might have given Arturo Menéndez excessive confidence during the Casas Viejas incident half a year later. Last but not least, the events elevated Sanjurjo to symbolic champion of later conspiracy, resulting in his appointment to nominal leader of the 1936 coup.

There are conflicting views on long-term impact of the coup on stability of the Republic. Some authors maintain that it strengthened the regime and helped to consolidate the forces supporting it. Others claim that the coup and Azaña's strategy to let it develop weakened the Republic by rocking the already unstable boat of Spanish politics. It was the first major attempt against the Republican constitutional order – thought not against the Republic itself - and soon it would prove the point of reference for the Right and for the Left, both sides plotting their own subversive schemes. There are students who compare Sanjurjada to 19th-century Spanish pronunciamientos: military-driven, politically ambiguous, praetorian in concept, with restoring order as key rationale and no popular mobilisation involved. Others consider it rather preconfiguration of the 1936 coup if not the Civil War itself. In Marxist historiography the coup is presented as a counter-revolutionary attempt financed by oligarchy of landowners, though also in many other scholarly works Sanjurjada is lined-up in a history of right-wing violence, increasingly flavored with authoritarian trends. There are scholars who consider Sanjurjo's action a stepping stone from accidentalism to fascism.

== See also ==
- José Sanjurjo
- Emilio Barrera
- Asturian miners' strike of 1934
- Spanish coup of July 1936
- Second biennium of the Second Spanish Republic
