= Castilblanco =

- Municipality
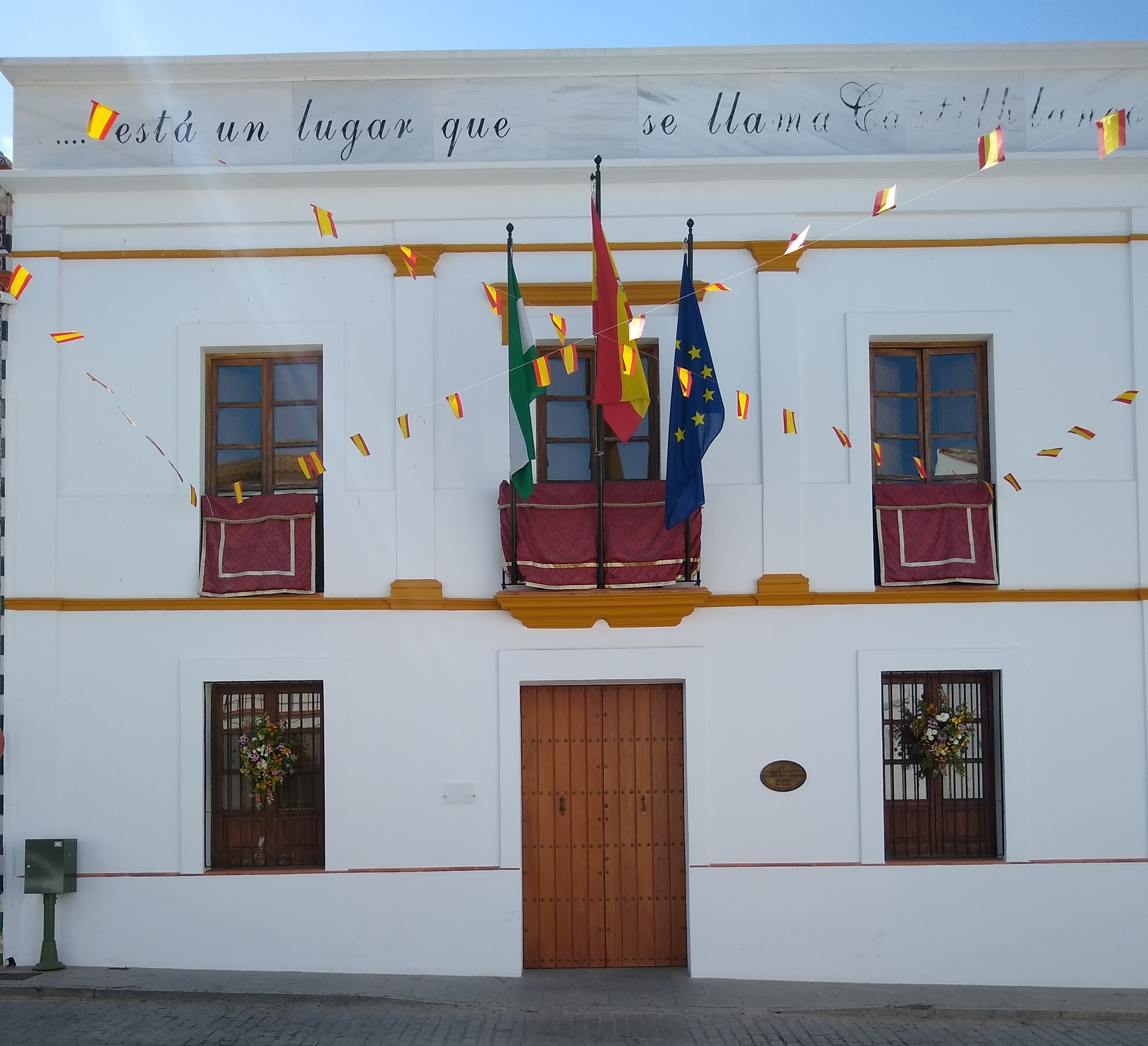
- Town hall

- Flag Coat of arms

- Location of Castilblanco within Extremadura
- Coordinates: 39°17′06″N 05°05′26″W
- Country: Spain
- Autonomous community: Extremadura
- Province: Badajoz
- Founded: 12th century

Government
  - Type: Mayor–council
  - Body: Ayuntamiento de Castilblanco
  - Mayor: Rafael Delgado (PSOE)

Area
  - Total: 1,316 km^{2} (508 sq mi)
- Elevation: 501 m (1,644 ft)

Population (2025-01-01)
  - Total: 820
  - Density: 0.62/km^{2} (1.6/sq mi)
- Demonym(s): castilblanqueño (m), castilblanqueña (f)
- Time zone: UTC+1 (CET)
  - Summer (DST): UTC+2 (CEST)
- Postal code: 06680
- Website: www.castilblanco.es

Castilblanco is a municipality located in the province of Badajoz, Extremadura, Spain. According to the 2005 census (INE), the municipality has a population of 1146 inhabitants.

== Toponymy ==
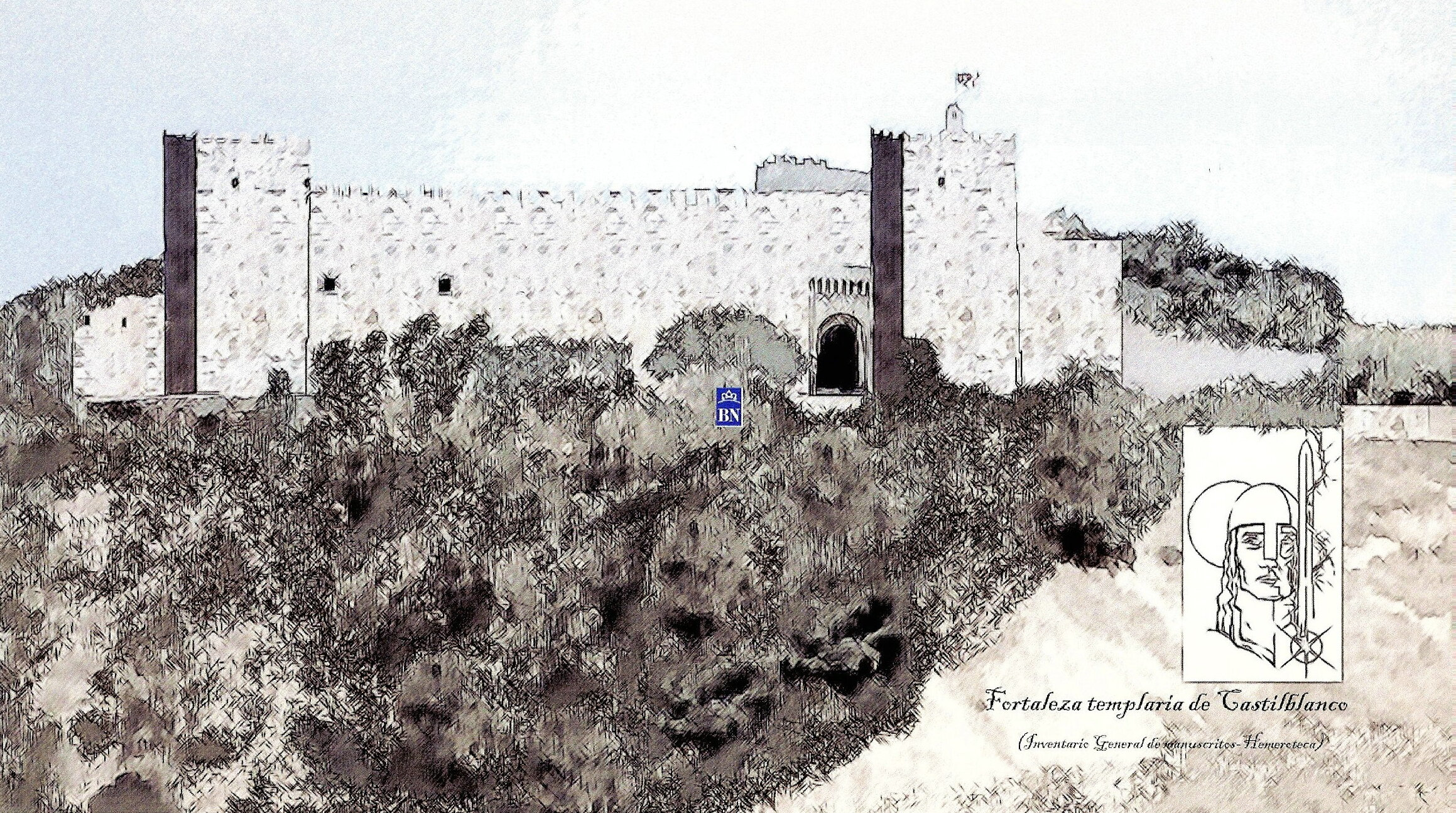
Engraving with a hypothetical shape of the original fortress.

There is no accord about the origins of the name of Castilblanco, but it is known that it is related to an ancient castle located where the San Cristóbal church is located nowadays. It is not known who built the castle. They could have been Arabs or Christians in the beginnings of 12th century, during the Reconquista. Many historians argue both that Castilblanco was a Templar enclave and that it would have been known as castillo blanco (white castle) or castillo de los blancos because of the colour of the robe that the Templars wore.

== Symbols ==
The official symbol of Castilblanco is its coat of arms. Within it there are represented a castle -in memory of the town's origins- an oak and olive -the most common trees in the surroundings-, the villa declaration -by which Castilblanco got sovereignty in 1554- and a rock-rose flower, in memory of the comarca of La Jara (The Rock-Rose), to which Castilblanco belonged until its incorporation to the province of Badajoz after the fall of the Old Regime.

The coat of arms was approved by a decree of the Extremadura Government in 1986, and it is officially described as follows:

Escudo Cuartelado, trayendo: 1ª, de gules, un castillo árabe de plata. 2ª de plata, un olivo de sinople. 3ª, también de plata, una encina de sinople. 4ª, de azur, una cartela de plata con la leyenda "Declaración de Villa por Carlos I, año de 1554", en letras de sable. Sobre el todo una flor de jara. Al timbre, corona mural de villa.

== Physical geography ==
=== Location ===
The municipality is located within the comarca of La Siberia, which borders with the provinces of Cáceres, Ciudad Real and Toledo. The town is built on a hill southern the Guadalupe Range -which belongs to the Toledo Mountains- and between the Guadiana and Guadalupe rivers. The town belongs to the judicial district of Herrera del Duque.

=== Orography ===
The urban area is located on a hill which rises above the surroundings countryside. The northern area of the municipality consists of a wide raña soil, undermined by narrow valleys with north-south orientation. These valleys are formed by the streams which flow north. These empty into both the Guadiana and Guadalupe rivers. The eastern area of the municipality has the most irregular relief, while both the western and southern countryside consists generally of fields with gentle slopes.

At the boundaries of the municipality are located several ranges which are visible from the urban centre. These ranges belong to the Toledo Mountains, which surround the town on the northern, eastern and southern sides. The ranges located north of the municipality are highest in altitude. Amongst these the highest are the Guadalupe Range, the Altamira Range and the Villuercas Range. The latter reaches 1600 meters. The land extending to the east is very irregular although it is of lower altitudes (around 700 meters at its highest points). In this area there highlight some ranges like Rinconada Range, Palomera Range and Umbría Range. The southern boundary of the municipality, where both the Guadiana and Guadalupe rivers converge, is also a mountainous terrain bounded by the ranges of Barbas de Oro, Pastillos, Chimenea, Escorial, Villares y Golondrinos. All these ranges are of similar altitudes as those to the east.

== History ==
In April 1556 Castilblanco was granted the formal title of Villa (town) by King Carlos I, at the request of the Archbishop of Toledo. The population at that time totaled 296 households. Castilblanco had previously been considered an extension of neighboring Talavera.

In December 1931, eight months after the establishment of the Second Spanish Republic, Castilblanco was the scene of a violent and unexpected incident. At the time it was a pueblo (village) of about 900 reasonably prosperous inhabitants and had no record of political or social unrest. Permission was however refused by the authorities when local socialist leaders proposed a demonstration (the second of two) against the civil governor of Badajoz. The socialist rally went ahead and the Civil Guard detachment based in the village intervened to disperse it at the instructions of the mayor of the municipality. A crowd of villagers confronted the civil guards who, as elsewhere in rural Spain, were resented as an unpopular and repressive force deliberately recruited from outside the region where they were stationed. After a shot was fired, the four civil guards present were knifed to death and their bodies mutilated. It was not possible to identify the actual killers, although six villagers were subsequently sentenced to life imprisonment. The incident was the first of a series of disturbances that led up to the outbreak of the Spanish Civil War in 1936.

== See also ==
- SP Castilblanco
- List of municipalities in Badajoz
