= Manuel Azaña =

Spanish Republican; Prime Minister & President (1880–1940)

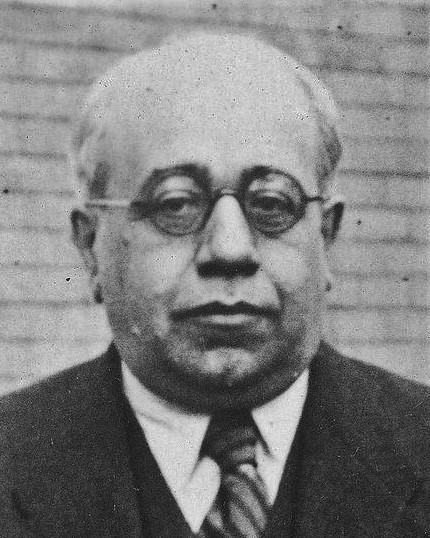

President of the Spanish Republic
- In office 7 April 1936 – 3 March 1939
- Prime Minister: Santiago Casares Quiroga; Diego Martínez Barrio; José Giral Pereira; Francisco Largo Caballero; Juan Negrín López
- Preceded by: Niceto Alcalá-Zamora
- Succeeded by: Francisco Franco (Caudillo of Spain)

Prime Minister of Spain
- In office 19 February 1936 – 10 May 1936
- President: Niceto Alcalá-Zamora
- Preceded by: Manuel Portela Valladares
- Succeeded by: Santiago Casares Quiroga
- In office 14 October 1931 – 12 September 1933
- President: Niceto Alcalá-Zamora
- Preceded by: Juan Bautista Aznar Cabañas
- Succeeded by: Alejandro Lerroux

Minister of War
- In office 14 April 1931 – 12 September 1933
- Preceded by: Dámaso Berenguer
- Succeeded by: Juan José Rocha García

Member of the Congress of Deputies
- In office 16 March 1936 – 31 March 1939
- Constituency: Madrid
- In office 8 December 1933 – 7 January 1936
- Constituency: Vizcaya
- In office 14 July 1931 – 9 October 1933
- Constituency: Valencia

Personal details
- Born: Manuel Azaña Díaz; 10 January 1880 Alcalá de Henares, Madrid, Kingdom of Spain
- Died: 3 November 1940 (aged 60) Montauban, Midi-Pyrénées, Vichy France
- Resting place: Montauban Cemetery, France
- Party: Republican Left (1934–1940)
- Other political affiliations: Republican Action (1930–1934)
- Spouse: Dolores de Rivas Cherif
- Occupation: Jurist
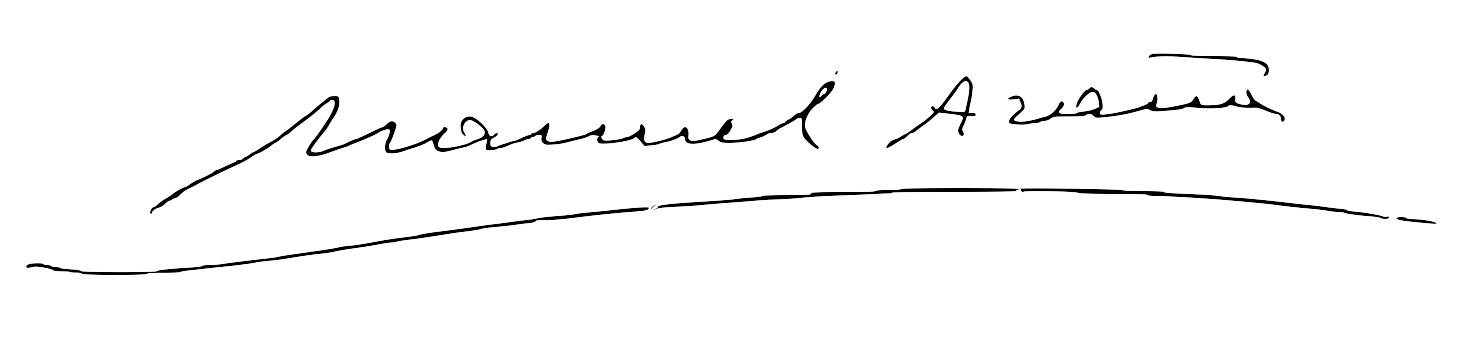
- Signature

Manuel Azaña Díaz (Spanish pronunciation: [maˈnwel aˈθaɲa]; 10 January 1880 – 3 November 1940) was a Spanish politician who served as Prime Minister of the Second Spanish Republic (1931–1933 and 1936), organizer of the Popular Front in 1935 and the last President of the Republic (1936–1939). He has been called the father of the Republic and was the most prominent leader of the Republican cause during the Spanish Civil War of 1936–1939.

A published author in the 1910s, he stood out in the pro-Allies camp during World War I. He was sharply critical towards the Generation of '98, the reimagination of the Spanish Middle Ages, Imperial Spain and the 20th century yearnings for a praetorian refurbishment of the country. Azaña followed instead the examples of the French Enlightenment and the Third French Republic, and took a political quest for democracy in the 1920s while defending the notion of homeland as the "democratic equality of all citizens towards the law" that made him embrace republicanism.

After the Proclamation of the Second Spanish Republic in April 1931, Azaña became Minister of War of the Provisional Government and enacted military reform, looking to develop a modern armed forces with fewer army officers. He later became Prime Minister in October 1931. In 1934 he founded the Republican Left party.

The Spanish Civil War broke out while he was President of Spain. With the defeat of the Republic in 1939, he fled to France, resigned from office, and died in exile only a year later at age 60.

== Early career ==
Family coat of arms of Manuel Azaña.

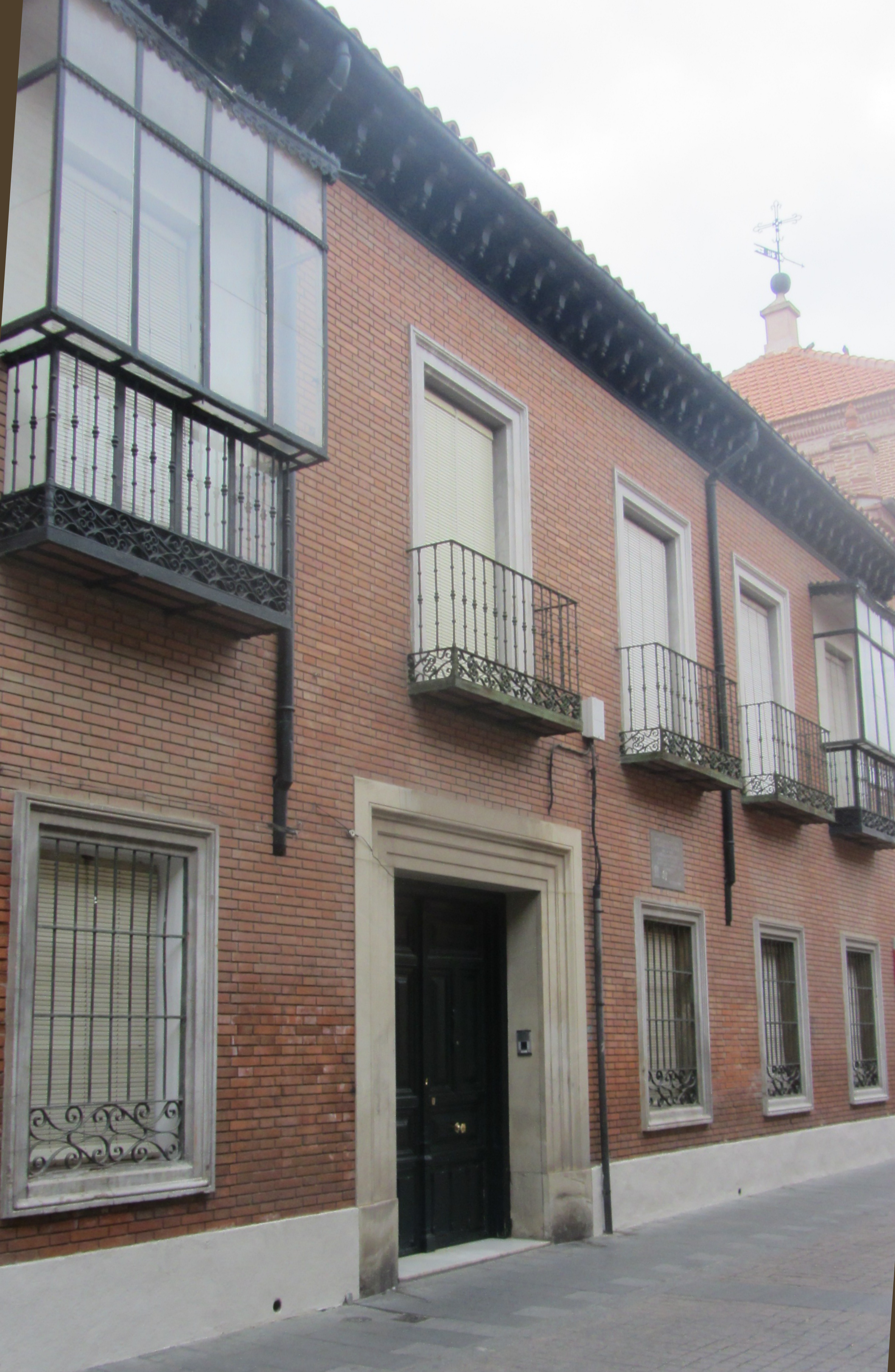
Birthplace of Manuel Azaña, in Alcalá de Henares.

Born into a wealthy family, Manuel Azaña Díaz was orphaned at a very young age. He studied in the Universidad Complutense, the Cisneros Institute and the Agustinos of El Escorial. He was awarded a Lawyer's licence by the University of Zaragoza in 1897, and a doctorate by the Universidad Complutense in 1900.

In 1909, he achieved a position at the Main Directorate of the Registries and practised the profession of civil law notary, and travelled to Paris in 1911. He became involved in politics and in 1914 joined the Reformist Republican Party led by Melquíades Álvarez. He collaborated in the production of various newspapers, such as El Imparcial and El Sol. He also joined the Freemasons.

During World War I, he covered operations on the Western Front for various newspapers. His treatment was very sympathetic to the French, and he may have been sponsored by French military intelligence. Afterwards he edited the magazines Pluma and España between 1920 and 1924, founding the former with his brother-in-law Cipriano Rivas Cherif. He was secretary of the Ateneo de Madrid (1913–1920), becoming its president in 1930. He was a candidate for the province of Toledo in 1918 and 1923, but lost on both occasions. In 1926 he founded the Acción Republicana ("Republican Action") party with José Giral.

A strong critic of the dictatorship of Primo de Rivera, Azaña published a stirring manifesto against the dictator and King Alfonso XIII in 1924. In 1930, he was a signatory of the "Pact of San Sebastián", which united all the republican and regionalist parties in Spain against Primo de Rivera and the King.

On 12 April 1931, republican candidates swept the municipal elections. This was seen as repudiation of Primo de Rivera and the monarchy. Two days later, the Second Spanish Republic was proclaimed and the King forced into exile.

== In the government ==
Niceto Alcalá-Zamora, prime minister of the provisional government of the Republic, named Azaña Minister of War on 14 April. Alcalá-Zamora resigned in October, and Azaña replaced him as prime minister. When the new constitution was adopted on 9 December, Azaña continued as prime minister, leading a coalition of left-wing parties, including his own Acción Republicana and the Socialists (PSOE), while Alcalá-Zamora became President of the Republic.

A wide range of reforms were carried out during the course of Azaña's premiership. An Act providing for the establishment of free public employment offices was passed in November 1931. Public education was expanded, with thousands of new schools built across Spain. New laws were passed that encouraged cooperatives and collectives, while also providing safeguards from eviction for tenants. The Labor Contracts Law of November 1931 aimed to promote (as noted by one study) “collective bargaining, facilitating written labor agreements in companies with more than fifty employees,” while a specific law for professional associations was passed in April 1932. A decree of November 1931 set up a mutual insurance fund for maritime and workplace accidents. In 1932, a bill on worker’s associations was passed that (as noted by one study) “updated existing legislation and facilitated the organization and activity of trade unions.” That same year, work accident insurance was introduced. The size of the Spanish Army was also reduced, and some monarchist officers were removed. Azaña also moved to reduce the power and influence of the Roman Catholic Church, abolishing Church-operated schools and charities, and greatly expanding state-operated secular schools. Azaña defend these measures under his administration by saying "Do not tell me that this is contrary to freedom. It is a matter of public health".

Women’s rights also received a lot of attention. The Labor Contract Law of 1931, as noted by one study, “established the validity of payments made to a married woman as long as the husband did not object.” A decree of December 1931, as one study has noted, “declared null and void any clauses in employment contracts, agreements, or regulations that terminated the employment contract upon marriage.” A decree of May 1932 (as noted by one study) “authorized the admission of women to the aptitude test to obtain the title of secretary of municipal courts.” In addition, a decree of May 1933 recognized the right of women to hold in the courts the position of solicitor.

The Spanish legislature, the Cortes, also enacted an agrarian reform program under which large private landholdings (latifundia) were to be confiscated and distributed among the rural poor. Agrarian reform was demanded by the Socialists, and was supported by Azaña and the left-wing Republicans. However, the agrarian law did not include state-funded collective farms, as the Socialists wanted, and was not enacted until late 1932. It was also clumsily written, and threatened many relatively small landholders more than the latifundists. The Azaña government also did very little to carry it out: only 12,000 families received land in the first two years.

In addition, Azaña did little to reform the taxation system to shift the burden of government onto the wealthy. Also, the government continued to support the owners of industry against wildcat strikes or attempted takeovers by militant workers, especially the anarcho-syndicalists of the Confederación Nacional del Trabajo (National Confederation of Labour or CNT). Confrontation with the CNT erupted in bloody violence at Casas Viejas (now Benalup) and Alt Llobregat. Violence against protesters also occurred against non CNT-affiliated workers during Castilblanco and Arnedo events.

Meanwhile, Azaña's extreme anti-clerical program alienated many moderates. In local elections held in early 1933, most of the seats went to conservative and centrist parties. Elections to the "Tribunal of Constitutional Guarantees" (the Republic's "Supreme Court") followed this pattern.

Thus Azaña came into conflict with both the right and far left. He called a vote of confidence, but two-thirds of the Cortes abstained, and Alcalá-Zamora ordered Azaña's resignation on 8 September 1933.

The resulting general election on 19 November 1933 was won by the right-wing Confederación Española de Derechas Autónomas (CEDA) and the centrist Radical Republican Party. Radical leader Alejandro Lerroux became prime minister. Azaña temporarily withdrew from politics and returned to literary activity.

Azaña's self-imposed political retreat lasted only a short while; in 1934 he founded the Republican Left party, the fusion of Acción Republicana with the Radical Socialist Republican Party, led by Marcelino Domingo, and the Organización Republicana Gallega Autónoma (ORGA) of Santiago Casares Quiroga.

On 5 October 1934, the PSOE and Communists attempted a general left-wing rebellion. The rebellion had a temporary success in Asturias and Barcelona, but was over in two weeks. Azaña was in Barcelona that day, and the Lerroux-CEDA government tried to implicate him. He was arrested and charged with complicity in the rebellion.

In fact, Azaña had no connection with the rebellion, and the attempt to convict him on spurious charges soon collapsed, giving him the prestige of a martyr. He was released from prison in January 1935. Azaña then helped organize the Frente Popular ("Popular Front"), a coalition of all the major left-wing parties for the elections of 16 February 1936.

The Front won the election, and Azaña became prime minister again on 19 February. His parliamentary coalition included the PSOE and Communists. This alarmed conservatives, who remembered their attempt to seize power only 17 months earlier. The Azaña government proclaimed an immediate amnesty for all prisoners from the rebellion, which increased conservative concerns. Socialists and Communists were appointed to important positions in the Assault Guard and Civil Guard.

Also, with the Popular Front victory, radicalized peasants led by the Socialists began seizing land on 25 March. Azaña chose to legitimize these actions rather than challenge them. Radical Socialists vied with Communists in calling for violent revolution and forcible suppression of the Right. Political assassinations by Communists, Socialists, and anarchosyndicalists were frequent, as were retaliations by increasingly radicalized conservatives.

Azaña insisted that the danger to the Republic was from the Right and on 11 March, the government suppressed the Falange.

Azaña was a man of very strong convictions. Historian Stanley G. Payne tentatively described him as "the last great figure of traditional Castilian arrogance in the history of Spain." As a "middle class republican", he was implacably hostile to the monarchy and the Church. The CEDA, which was pro-Catholic, he therefore regarded as illegitimate, and also any and all monarchists, even those who supported parliamentary democracy.

In the view of Paul Preston, nothing indicates more directly the value of the services provided by Azaña to the Republic than the hatred felt towards him by the ideologues and propagandists of the Francoist cause.

== Presidency ==
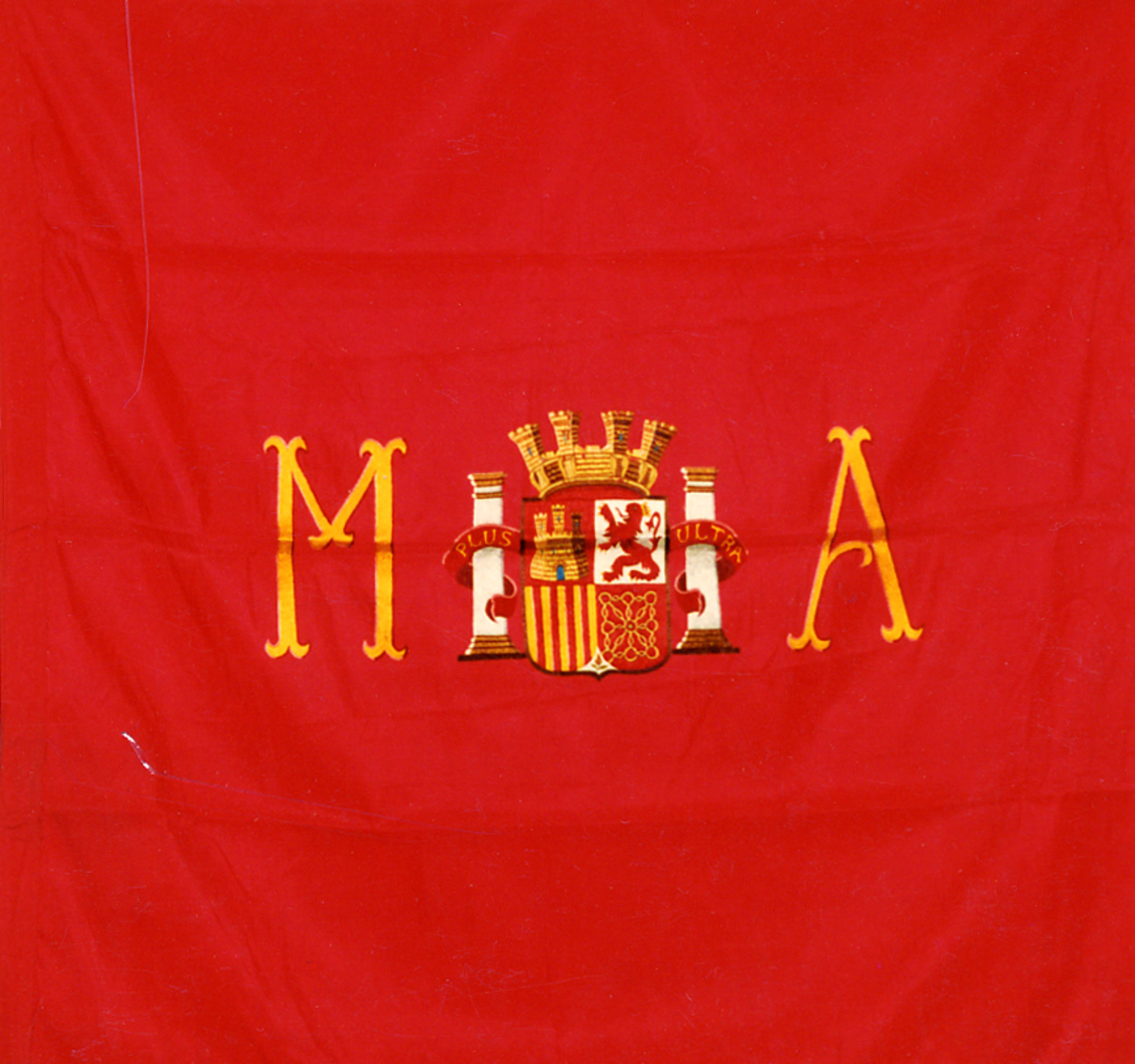
Presidential Standard of Manuel Azaña (1936–1939)

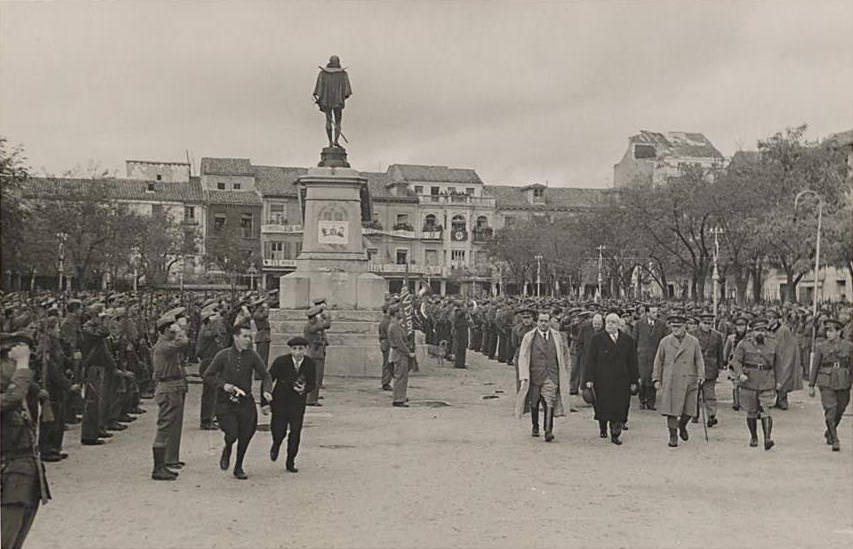
Military parade in Alcalá de Henares (November 1937).

When the Cortes met in April, it removed President Alcalá-Zamora from office. On 7 April 1936, Azaña was elected President of the Republic; Quiroga succeeded him as prime minister. Azaña by this time was profoundly depressed by the increasing disorder, but could see no way to counter it. Stanley Payne reports that in the Cortes meeting of 15 April, Azaña stated "I don't intend to serve as anyone's guardian angel" and told the right-wing deputies "[D]id you not want violence...? Then take to violence. Be prepared for the consequences", despite the fact that CEDA had adhered to the law. He would later regret these remarks and try to backtrack by blaming the violence and unrest on the Spanish national character, but this gave the impression the government was disinterested in enforcing the law.

Azaña repeatedly warned his fellow Republicans that the lack of unity within the government was a serious threat to the Republic's stability. Political violence continued: there were over 200 assassinations between February and early July.

By July, the military conspiracy to overthrow the Republic was well underway, but nothing definite had been planned. Then on 13 July, José Calvo Sotelo, leader of a small monarchist grouping in the Cortes, was arrested and murdered by a mixed group of Socialist gunmen and Assault Guards. Azaña and Quiroga did not act effectively against the killers.

On 17 July, right-wing, Falangist and monarchist elements in the Republican army proclaimed the overthrow of the Republic. The rebellion failed in Madrid, however. Azaña replaced Quiroga as Prime Minister with his ally Diego Martínez Barrio, and the government attempted a compromise with the rebels, which was rejected by General Mola.

On 13 September, Azaña authorized Minister of Finance Juan Negrín to move the nation's gold reserve to wherever Negrin thought it would be secure. Negrin shipped it to the Soviet Union, which claimed it in payment for arms supplied to the Republic.

=== Road to exile ===
Azaña left Madrid in October 1936; he would return to the capital on short visits, e.g. in November 1937, but he would never reside in Madrid again. He initially stayed briefly in Valencia and then in Barcelona, but in November 1936 he settled in the Montserrat Abbey, the iconic Catalan shrine in the Montserrat mountains, located some 35 km from Barcelona. The premises were largely vacated and the monks were partially evicted; much of the compound was turned into a military hospital, and part into the temporary presidential residence. Azaña lived in Montserrat for barely more than 2 months as he was urged to move closer to Valencia, since autumn 1936 the site of the government. In March 1937 he settled in "La Pobleta", a large isolated estate located among woods in the mountainous terrain of Sierra de Calderona, some 25 kilometres north-west of Valencia; it belonged to the rich bourgeoisie Noguera family and was expropriated by Comité Ejecutivo del Frente Popular de Serra. The president was residing there for almost a year. In autumn 1937 it was the government which moved from Valencia to Barcelona, and to stay in touch with the executive Azaña decided to return to Catalonia. He left "La Pobleta" and in February 1938 he settled in Torre Salvans, a similar large and isolated mansion in the "La Barata" estate, in wooden outskirts of Matadepera near Terrasa, some 30 km from Barcelona and some 15 km from his former residence in Montserrat. Built by a Lliga politician Francesc Salvans, killed by the Republicans, between late 1937 and early 1938 it was undergoing preparation works to host the head of state.

On 13 January 1939 General Juan Hernández Saravia advised the president to leave "La Barata" given rapid advance of Nationalist troops, the suggestion repeated by Negrin on 17 January. On 19 January Saravia insisted that the president evacuate; Azaña commenced preparations.

The president, his family and his entourage, including secretaries and military AdCs, left La Barata on 21 January (Nationalist troops would seize the place on 24 January). Following a drive of some 50 km east in the afternoon, the column of cars his entourage were travelling in reached the town of Llavaneras (now San Andreu de Llavaneres), north of Mataró, some 30 km from Barcelona and some 100 km from the French frontier. It turned out that the premises, supposed to host Azaña, were unsuitable; they spent the night in a randomly selected and hastily prepared house in a park.

The following day, 22 January, some members of Azaña's family left for France. The president proceeded to the coastal town of Caldetas (now Caldes d'Estrac), some 4 km away, where in another makeshift premises he spent the following one or two nights, while remainder of his belongings were being fetched from La Barata. During these few days he was almost entirely isolated, with little to no contact either with the government or the military command; at the same time, the evacuation of Barcelona had commenced.

The presidential column departed north from Caldetas on 23 or 24 January (the city would be seized by the Nationalists on 28 January), and following a drive of some 90 km, in the evening they reached the castle in Peralada, some 120 km from Barcelona, only 15 km from the French frontier; the Pyrenees were clearly visible from their new premises.

It was in Peralada that contact with the government, representatives of the Cortes, the Republican military and foreign envoys, was re-established. Castillo de Peralada remained Azaña's residence for around a week. During this period Barcelona fell to the Nationalists. On 30 January Negrín visited the president and offered to have an aircraft ready to take Azaña to France, should immediate evacuation be necessary. The president declined the proposal, fearing that Negrín would rather forcibly take Azaña to the central zone, Valencia or Madrid.

Some time at the end of January, early February (the exact day is unclear - 31 January at the earliest, 2 February at the latest) the president left Peralada and moved some 20 km north-west, to Agullana. It was a village in the Pyrennees, some 4 km from the French frontier, located by a secondary drive and away from main roads, which were crammed with refugees trying to flee Barcelona and Catalonia. Agullana at the time was also hosting the staff of general Rojo. The president spent one night there.

The following day, probably either on 2 or 3 February, Azaña left Agullana and drove some 5 km up the road, to the last Spanish settlement some 2 km from the French frontier, the hamlet of La Vajol. It is there he met his last foreign diplomatic representatives. On 4 February Negrín visited Azaña in La Vajol and suggested that, in view of the advance of Nationalist troops, the president cross to France as soon as possible.

On 5 February, at 6 AM, when it was still dark, Azaña, his wife, his entourage and some state officials departed La Vajol (which would be seized by the Nationalists on 9 February), fleeing north to France. What should have been a drive of a few minutes turned into a slightly longer journey. The leading police car broke down and blocked the narrow, winding, mountainous road. All the passengers had to leave their cars and proceed on foot, struggling on what proved a slippery, icy surface. The party encountered French gendarmes sometime after dawn.

== Last days ==
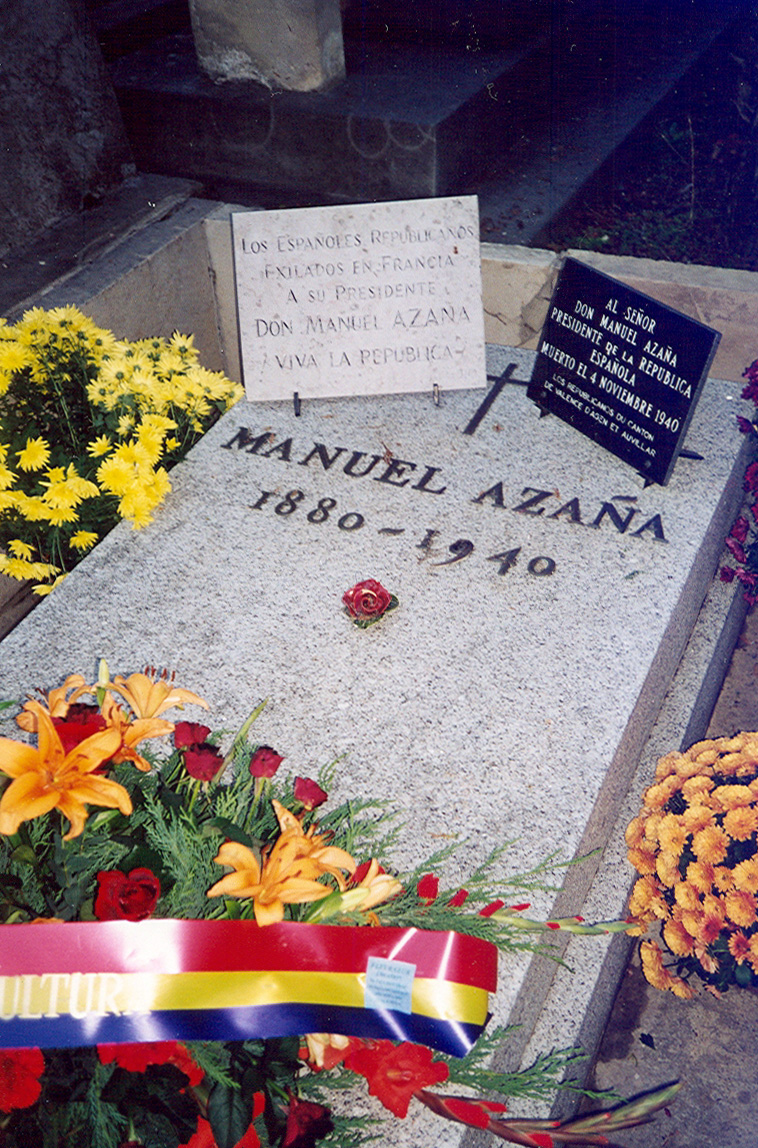
Manuel Azaña's grave in Montauban, France.

On 3 March, Manuel Azaña resigned as President of the Republic, rather than return to Madrid with the rest of the government. Both Nationalist and Republican commentators have condemned this decision as an act of "desertion".

Azaña lived in exile in France for more than a year after the war, eventually being trapped by the invasion of France by Germany and the institution of the Vichy regime. Even then, his safety was ensured due to the intervention of the Mexican government, which had refused to extend diplomatic recognition to Franco's regime (Mexico would not resume relations with Spain until 1977, two years after Franco's death). To prevent his arrest and extradition, Azaña was vested with Mexican citizenship and named Honorary Ambassador, thus granting him diplomatic immunity. His residence was officially an extension of the Mexican Embassy and therefore benefited from diplomatic immunity, and was closely monitored by Mexican military personnel.

Azaña died of natural causes on 3 November 1940, in Montauban, France. He received the last rites of Catholicism before his death. The Vichy authorities refused to allow his coffin to be covered with the Spanish Republican flag. The coffin was covered instead with the flag of Mexico.

== Writings ==
In his diaries and memoirs, on which he worked meticulously, Azaña vividly describes the various personality and ideological conflicts between himself and various Republican leaders, such as Largo Caballero and Negrín. Azaña's writings during the Civil War have been resources for study by scholars of the workings of the Republican government during the conflict. Along with his extensive memoirs and diaries, Azaña also wrote a number of well-known speeches. His speech on 18 July 1938 is one of the best known in which he implores his fellow Spaniards to seek reconciliation after the fighting ends and emphasizes the need for "Peace, Pity, and Pardon."

Azaña wrote a play during the Civil War, La velada en Benicarló ("Vigil in Benicarló"). Having worked on the play during the previous weeks, Azaña dictated the final version while he was trapped in Barcelona during the violence of the May Days. In the play, Azaña uses various characters to espouse the various ideological, political and social perspectives present within the Republic during the war. He portrayed and explored the rivalries and conflicts that were damaging the political cohesion of the Republic.

Azaña was aware of General Franco and Jose Sanjurjo's firm determination to overthrow the Republic, which would culminate in the Law of Political Responsibilities (Ley de Responsabilidades Políticas) at the end of the war. Saddened, he reflected:

A policy should never be based on the extermination of the adversary; not only because—and that is a lot to say—it is morally an abomination, but because it is materially unfeasible. And the blood unjustly spilled by the hatred that seeks to exterminate will be reborn, sprouting and giving accursed fruits; a curse that will not be restricted, unfortunately, to those who spilled the blood, but which will be over the very country which—to compound its misfortune—absorbed it.

Azaña's complete diaries were published posthumously in 2003 under the title Diarios completos: monarquía, república, Guerra Civil.

== Political legacy ==
According to British historian Piers Brendon, Manuel Azaña was the leading Republican politician. He was a well-educated would-be writer who "plotted to rid Spain of the yoke of church and king". A brilliant speaker, Azaña was graceful in word, but clumsy in action. "He was a polemical bullfighter but a political bulldozer". Although he preached a lofty form of liberalism, he had a mixed record as prime minister. He wanted to introduce a welfare state with a minimum wage, sickness benefits and paid holidays, but he never attempted to deal with the overwhelming problem of peasant poverty. He was so concerned to balance the budget that he cut back on land redistribution. He worked more effectively to establish a secular state, breaking the Catholic church's hold on education, legalizing civil marriage, seizing Catholic properties, expelling the Jesuit order, and tolerating the burning of church buildings such as convents for nuns. "All the convents in Spain are not worth a single Republican life," he proclaimed. As opposition mounted, he censored the press, exiled his enemies to North Africa, and formed a private militia force of Assault Guards. Meanwhile, his allies the anarchists were assassinating priests and nuns, and burning convents. Azaña tried to reform the army, by replacing outmoded equipment and closing its military academy. In the process he demoted its most promising general—young Francisco Franco. Azaña was defeated in the elections of November 1933, having antagonized extremists and alienated the moderates. He made a comeback in 1936 but could not hold his coalition together in the face of a civil war. In recent decades he has become a hero of the left in Spain.

== See also ==
- Grupo de Acción Republicana
- Second Spanish Republic
- Spanish Civil War
- Second biennium of the Second Spanish Republic

Political offices
Preceded by Dámaso Berenguer	Minister of War; 1931–1933	Succeeded by Juan José Rocha García
Preceded by Juan Bautista Aznar Cabañas	Prime Minister of Spain; 1931–1933	Succeeded by Alejandro Lerroux
Preceded by Manuel Portela Valladares	Prime Minister of Spain; 1936	Succeeded by Santiago Casares Quiroga
Preceded by Niceto Alcalá-Zamora	President of the Spanish Republic; 1936–1939	Succeeded by Álvaro de Albornoz Liminiana (in exile)
Preceded by Niceto Alcalá-Zamora	Spanish Head of State; 1936–1939	Succeeded by Francisco Franco Bahamonde as Caudillo
Party political offices
Preceded by Party created	Leader of Republican Action; 1925–1934	Succeeded by Party dissolved
Preceded by Party created	Leader of Republican Left; 1934–1936	Succeeded by Marcelino Domingo
