= Picayune (disambiguation) =

Picayune is an obsolete term for a coin of small value. Its meaning has been extended to the figurative sense of "trivial" or "of little value."

Picayune may also refer to:

- The Times-Picayune, a daily newspaper published in New Orleans, Louisiana, United States
- The Bloom Picayune, a fictional newspaper appearing in the Bloom County cartoon strip
- The Pickax Picayune, a fictional newspaper appearing in The Cat Who... mystery novels
- Picayune, Mississippi, a city in the southern United States
  - Picayune station, an Amtrak station in Picayune, Mississippi
- Picayune Creek, a river in Iowa
- Picayune Strand State Forest, a protected area near Naples, Florida, United States
- John "Picayune" Butler, an influential black entertainer who lived in 19th-century New Orleans
- Picayune cigarettes, a strong-tasting now-defunct brand previously marketed by Liggett & Myers Tobacco Company
- Picayune Rancheria of Chukchansi Indians, the home of a federally recognized tribe of indigenous people of California
