= Francisco Franco =

Leader of Spain from 1939 to 1975

Caudillo Francisco Franco
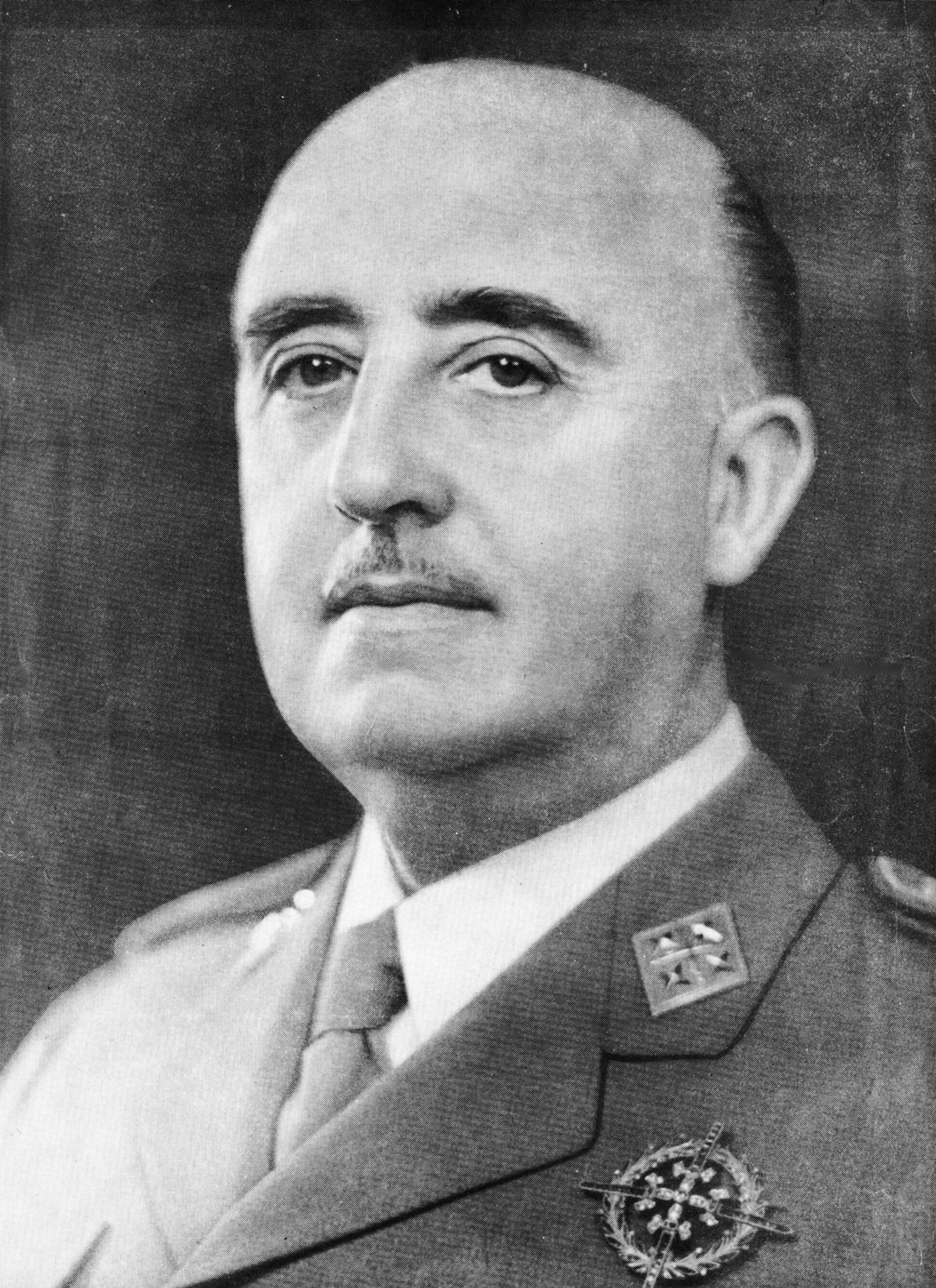
- Formal portrait, c. 1960

Caudillo of Spain (Note: The rebels appointed him Generalissimo of the Armies and Head of the Government of the Spanish State at the end of September 1936, while in 1938 he gained the formal title Caudillo. Head of State was one of the titles most frequently used by the regime after Franco's official appointment on 1 October 1936, and was the title used in the 1967 Organic Law of the State.)
- In office 1 October 1936 (Note: In civil war until 1 April 1939.) – 20 November 1975
- Prime Minister: Himself; Luis Carrero Blanco; Carlos Arias Navarro
- Preceded by: Miguel Cabanellas (as President of the National Defence Junta of the Nationalist side); Manuel Azaña (as President)
- Succeeded by: Alejandro Rodríguez de Valcárcel (acting); Juan Carlos I (as King)

Prime Minister of Spain (Note: The post of Prime Minister was attached to that of Head of State until the 1967 Organic Law of the State, with the separation coming into force with Franco's resignation as Prime Minister on 9 June 1973.)
- In office 30 January 1938 – 9 June 1973
- Deputy: Agustín Muñoz Grandes; Luis Carrero Blanco
- Preceded by: Francisco Gómez-Jordana (Note: President of the Technical State Junta of the Nationalist side); Juan Negrín
- Succeeded by: Luis Carrero Blanco

National Chief of FET y de las JONS
- In office 19 April 1937 – 20 November 1975
- Deputy: Francisco Gómez-Jordana (1938‍–‍1939); None (1939–1962); Agustín Muñoz Grandes (1962‍–‍1967); Luis Carrero Blanco (1967‍–‍1973)
- Preceded by: Position established
- Succeeded by: Carlos Arias Navarro

Personal details
- Born: Francisco Paulino Hermenegildo Teódulo Franco Bahamonde; 4 December 1892 Ferrol, Kingdom of Spain
- Died: 20 November 1975 (aged 82) Madrid, Francoist Spain
- Resting place: Valley of the Fallen, Madrid (1975–2019); Mingorrubio Cemetery, Madrid (since 2019)
- Party: FET y de las JONS (Movimiento Nacional)
- Spouse: Carmen Polo (m. 1923)
- Children: María del Carmen
- Relatives: Nicolás Franco (brother); Ramón Franco (brother); Francisco Franco (cousin); Ricardo de la Puente (cousin)
- Education: Infantry Academy of Toledo

Military service
- Allegiance: Kingdom of Spain (1907–1931); Second Spanish Republic (1931–1936); Spanish State (1936–1975)
- Branch: Spanish Armed Forces
- Service years: 1907–1975
- Rank: Captain general: Army; Air Force; Navy; Generalissimo
- Commands: Spanish Armed Forces (Francoist)
- Battles/wars: 2nd Melillan Campaign; Rif War (WIA); Revolution of 1934; Spanish Civil War; Spanish Republican insurgency; Ifni War

Francisco Franco Bahamonde (Note: /ˈfræŋkoʊ/ or /ˈfrɑːŋkoʊ/; Spanish: [fɾanˈθisko ˈfɾaŋko βa.aˈmonde]) (Note: Full baptismal name: Francisco Paulino Hermenegildo Teódulo Franco Bahamonde) (Note: In this Spanish name, the first or paternal surname is Franco and the second or maternal family name is Bahamonde.) (4 December 1892 – 20 November 1975) was a Spanish military general and the dictator of Spain from 1939 until his death in 1975. He had led the Nationalist forces in overthrowing the Second Spanish Republic during the Spanish Civil War from 1936 to 1939. This period in Spanish history, from the Nationalist victory to Franco's death, is commonly known as Francoist Spain.

Born in Ferrol, Galicia, into an upper-class military family, Franco served in the Spanish Army as a cadet in the Toledo Infantry Academy from 1907 to 1910. While serving in Morocco, he rose through the ranks to become a brigadier general in 1926 at age 33. Two years later, Franco became the director of the General Military Academy in Zaragoza. As a conservative and monarchist at the time, Franco regretted the abolition of the monarchy and the establishment of the Second Republic in 1931, and was devastated by the closing of his academy; nevertheless, he continued his service in the Republican Army. His career was boosted after the right-wing CEDA and PRR won the 1933 election, empowering him to lead the suppression of the 1934 uprising in Asturias. Franco was briefly elevated to Chief of Army Staff before the 1936 election moved the leftist Popular Front into power, relegating him to the Canary Islands.

Franco joined the July 1936 military coup, which, after failing to take Spain, sparked the Spanish Civil War. He commanded Spain's African colonial army. Later, following the deaths of much of the rebel leadership, he became his faction's only leader, and was appointed generalissimo and head of state in 1936. He consolidated all Nationalist groups into the party FET y de las JONS (also known as the Falange and the Movimiento Nacional), and developed a cult of personality around his rule. The war became the central myth of the emerging regime, being defined as the Crusade to cleanse Spain and achieve a national rebirth. He presented himself as the direct successor of José Antonio Primo de Rivera, the Falange's pre-war founder executed by the Republicans, and became recognized as a fascist leader while receiving support from Fascist Italy and Nazi Germany. Franco's own views remained conservative compared to the socio-economic radicals of pre-war Falange and Italian Fascism of Benito Mussolini, but he sympathized with fascism and shared its ideas. Three years after the rebellion, the Nationalists declared victory, which extended Franco's rule over Spain through a period of extreme repression of political opponents. His government's use of forced labour, concentration camps and executions after the war led to at least 30,000 deaths, with some estimates exceeding 200,000. Combined with wartime killings, this brings the death toll of the White Terror to between 100,000 and 350,000 or more. During World War II, he maintained Spanish neutrality, but supported the Axis powers, damaging the country's international reputation. After 1945 and in further decades, Franco and his officials continued supporting fascists and neo-fascism abroad, participating in creation of the ratlines for the Axis war criminals.

In the late 1950s, Franco lifted Spain out of its mid-20th century economic depression through technocratic and economically liberal policies, presiding over a period of accelerated growth known as the "Spanish miracle". At the same time, by form his regime transitioned from a totalitarian state to a "more conventionally authoritarian" one, as its ideological and totalitarian foundations eroded. He became a leader in the anti-communist movement, garnering support from the West, particularly the United States. As the government relaxed its hard-line policies, Luis Carrero Blanco became Franco's éminence grise, whose role expanded after Franco began struggling with Parkinson's disease in the 1960s. In 1973, Franco resigned as prime minister—separated from the office of head of state since 1967—due to his advanced age and illness. Nevertheless, he remained in power as the head of state and as commander-in-chief. Franco died in 1975, aged 82, and was entombed in the Valley of the Fallen. He restored the monarchy in his final years, being succeeded by King Juan Carlos, who led the Spanish transition to democracy.

The legacy of Franco in Spanish history remains controversial, as the nature of his rule changed over time. His reign was marked by both severe repression, with tens of thousands killed, and economic prosperity, which greatly improved the quality of life in Spain. His style proved adaptable enough to allow social and economic reform, but still centred on highly authoritarian nationalism. Contemporaries regarded Franco as a fascist dictator. Among scholars, by contrast, there has been a long-lasting debate whether it is adequate to define Franco's regime as fascist. It has been described in broad definitions, from a traditional military dictatorship to a para-fascist or a fully fascist regime. While the line that defines Francoism as authoritarian as opposed to fascism dates back to the 1960s, since then more authors have emerged who criticize it and reemphasize the fascist and totalitarian characteristics of Francoism.

== Early life ==
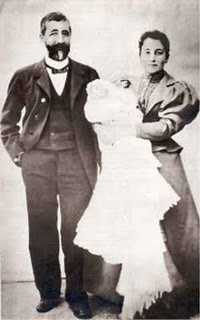
Franco being held by his parents, on the day of his baptism on 17 December 1892

Francisco Paulino Hermenegildo Teódulo Franco Bahamonde was born on 4 December 1892 in the Calle Frutos Saavedra in Ferrol, Galicia, into a seafaring family. He was baptised thirteen days later at the military church of San Francisco, with the baptismal name Francisco Paulino Hermenegildo Teódulo.

After relocating to Galicia, the Franco family was involved in the Spanish Navy, and over the span of two centuries produced naval officers for six uninterrupted generations (including several admirals), down to Franco's father Nicolás Franco Salgado-Araújo (22 November 1855 – 22 February 1942).

His mother, María del Pilar Bahamonde y Pardo de Andrade (15 October 1865 – 28 February 1934), was from an upper-middle-class Roman Catholic family. Her father, Ladislao Bahamonde Ortega, was the commissar of naval equipment at the Port of El Ferrol. Franco's parents married in 1890 in the Church of San Francisco in El Ferrol. The young Franco spent much of his childhood with his two brothers, Nicolás and Ramón, and his two sisters, María del Pilar and María de la Paz. His brother Nicolás was a naval officer and diplomat who married María Isabel Pascual del Pobil. Ramón was an internationally known aviator, a military man like his other two brothers, and a Freemason, originally with leftist political leanings. He was also the second sibling to die, killed in an air accident on a military mission in 1938.

Franco's father was a naval officer who reached the rank of vice admiral (intendente general). When Franco was fourteen, his father moved to Madrid following a reassignment and ultimately abandoned his family, marrying another woman. While Franco did not suffer any great abuse by his father's hand, he never overcame his antipathy for his father and largely ignored him for the rest of his life. Years after becoming leader, under the pseudonym Jaime de Andrade, Franco wrote a brief novel called Raza, whose protagonist is believed by Stanley Payne to represent the idealised man Franco wished his father had been. Conversely, Franco strongly identified with his mother (who always wore widow's black once she realised her husband had abandoned her) and learned from her moderation, austerity, self-control, family solidarity and respect for Catholicism, though he would also inherit his father's harshness, coldness and implacability.

== Military career ==
=== Rif War and advancement through the ranks ===
Franco would have followed his father into the Navy, but as a result of the Spanish–American War the country lost much of its navy as well as most of its colonies. Not needing any more officers, the Naval Academy admitted no new entrants from 1906 to 1913. To his father's chagrin, Franco decided to try the Spanish Army. In 1907, he entered the Infantry Academy in Toledo. At the age of fourteen, Franco was one of the youngest members of his class, with most boys being between sixteen and eighteen. He was short and was bullied for his small size. His grades were average; though his good memory meant he seldom struggled academically, his small stature was a hindrance in physical tests. He graduated in July 1910 as a second lieutenant, standing 251st out of 312 cadets in his class, though this might have had less to do with his grades than with his small size and young age. Stanley Payne observes that by the time civil war began, Franco had already become a major general and would soon be a generalissimo, while none of his higher-ranking fellow cadets had managed to get beyond the rank of lieutenant-colonel. Franco was promoted to the rank of first lieutenant in June 1912 at age 19. Two years later, he obtained a commission to Morocco. Spanish efforts to occupy the new African protectorate provoked the Second Melillan campaign in 1909 against native Moroccans, the first of several Riffian rebellions. Their tactics resulted in heavy losses among Spanish military officers, and also provided an opportunity to earn promotion through merit on the battlefield. It was said that officers would receive either la caja o la faja (a coffin or a general's sash). Franco quickly gained a reputation as an effective officer.

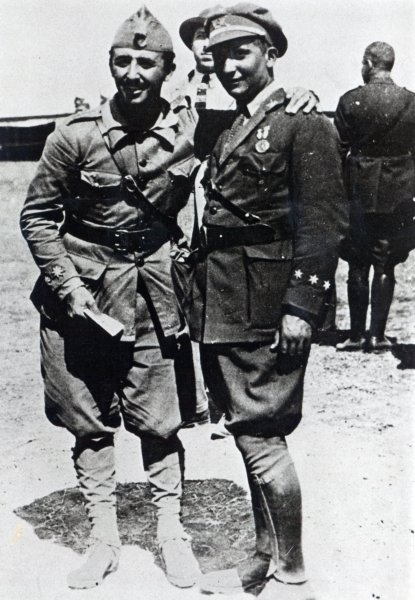
Francisco and his brother Ramón in North Africa, 1925

In 1913, Franco transferred into the newly formed regulares: Moroccan colonial troops with Spanish officers, who acted as elite shock troops. In 1916, aged 23 with the rank of captain, Franco was shot in the abdomen by guerrilla gunfire during an assault on Moroccan positions at El Biutz, in the hills near Ceuta; this was the only time he was wounded in ten years of fighting. The wound was serious, and he was not expected to live. His recovery was seen by his Moroccan troops as a spiritual event – they believed Franco to be blessed with baraka or protected by God. He was recommended for promotion to major and to receive Spain's highest honour for gallantry, the coveted Cruz Laureada de San Fernando. Both proposals were denied, with the 23-year-old Franco's young age being given as the reason for denial. Franco appealed the decision to the king, who reversed it. Franco also received the Cross of Maria Cristina, First Class.

With that he was promoted to major at the end of February 1917 at age 24. This made him the youngest major in the Spanish army. From 1917 to 1920, he served in Spain. In 1920, Lieutenant Colonel José Millán Astray, a histrionic but charismatic officer, founded the Spanish Foreign Legion, along similar lines to the French Foreign Legion. Franco became the Legion's second-in-command and returned to Africa. In the Rif War, the poorly commanded and overextended Spanish Army was defeated by the Republic of the Rif under the leadership of the Abd el-Krim brothers, who crushed a Spanish offensive on 24 July 1921, at Annual. The Legion and supporting units relieved the Spanish city of Melilla after a three-day forced march led by Franco. In 1923, now a lieutenant colonel, he was made commander of the Legion.

On 22 October 1923, Franco married María del Carmen Polo y Martínez-Valdès (11 June 1900 – 6 February 1988). Following his honeymoon Franco was summoned to Madrid to be presented to King Alfonso XIII. This and other occasions of royal attention would mark him during the Republic as a monarchical officer.

Disappointed with the plans by Lieutenant General Miguel Primo de Rivera, Spain's Prime Minister, for a strategic retreat from the interior to the African coastline, Colonel Franco wrote in the April 1924 issue of Revista de Tropas Coloniales (Colonial Troops Magazine) that he would disobey orders of retreat given by a superior. As a result, Franco had a tense meeting with Primo de Rivera in July.

Lieutenant Colonel Franco visited a fellow africanista, General Gonzalo Queipo de Llano, on 21 September 1924 to propose that Queip de Llano organise a coup d'état against Primo. In the end, Franco complied with General Primo's orders, taking part in the retreat of Spanish soldiers from Xaouen in late 1924, and thus earning a promotion to colonel.

Franco led the first wave of troops ashore at Al Hoceima (Spanish: Alhucemas) in 1925. This landing in the heartland of Abd el-Krim's tribe, combined with the French invasion from the south, spelled the beginning of the end for the short-lived Republic of the Rif. Franco was promoted to brigadier general on 3 February 1926, said to be the youngest general in Europe.

On 14 September 1926, Franco and Polo had a daughter, María del Carmen. However, persistent rumors and historical research strongly suggest that she may have actually been the biological daughter of Franco's younger brother, Ramon Franco and a prostitute who died after giving birth to her. The theory stems from rumors that Francisco Franco was sterile following his abdominal injury suffered in 1916. Furthermore, there is a lack of photographs showing Carmen Polo pregnant, photos of Maria as a baby, and the absence of a proper medical birth certificate. In any case, Franco would have a close relationship with his daughter and was a proud parent, though his traditionalist attitudes and increasing responsibilities meant he left much of the child-rearing to his wife.

In 1928 Franco was appointed director of the newly created General Military Academy of Zaragoza, a new college for all Spanish army cadets, replacing the former separate institutions for young men seeking to become officers in infantry, cavalry, artillery, and other branches of the army. Franco was removed as Director of the Zaragoza Military Academy in 1931; when the Civil War began, the colonels, majors, and captains of the Spanish Army who had attended the academy when he was its director displayed unconditional loyalty to him as Caudillo.

=== During the Second Spanish Republic ===
The municipal elections of 12 April 1931 were largely seen as a plebiscite on the monarchy. The Republican-Socialist alliance failed to win the majority of the municipalities in Spain but had a landslide victory in all the large cities and in almost all the provincial capitals. The monarchists and the army deserted Alfonso XIII and consequently the king decided to leave the country and go into exile, giving way to the Second Spanish Republic. Although Franco believed that the majority of the Spanish people still supported the crown, and although he regretted the end of the monarchy, he did not object, nor did he challenge the legitimacy of the republic. The closing of the academy in June by the provisional War Minister Manuel Azaña however was a major setback for Franco and provoked his first clash with the Spanish Republic. Azaña found Franco's farewell speech to the cadets insulting. In his speech Franco stressed the Republic's need for discipline and respect. Azaña entered an official reprimand into Franco's personnel file and for six months Franco was without a post and under surveillance.

In December 1931, a new reformist, liberal, and democratic constitution was declared. It included strong provisions enforcing a broad secularisation of the Catholic country, which included the abolishing of Catholic schools and charities, which many moderate committed Catholics opposed. At this point, once the constituent assembly had fulfilled its mandate of approving a new constitution, it should have arranged for regular parliamentary elections and adjourned, according to historian Carlton J. H. Hayes. Fearing the increasing popular opposition, the Radical and Socialist majority postponed the regular elections, thereby prolonging their stay in power for two more years. This way the republican government of Manuel Azaña initiated numerous reforms to what in their view would "modernize" the country.

Franco was a subscriber to the journal of Acción Española, a monarchist organisation, and a firm believer in a supposed Jewish-Masonic-Bolshevik conspiracy, or contubernio (conspiracy). The conspiracy suggested that Jews, Freemasons, Communists, and other leftists alike sought the destruction of Christian Europe, with Spain being the principal target.

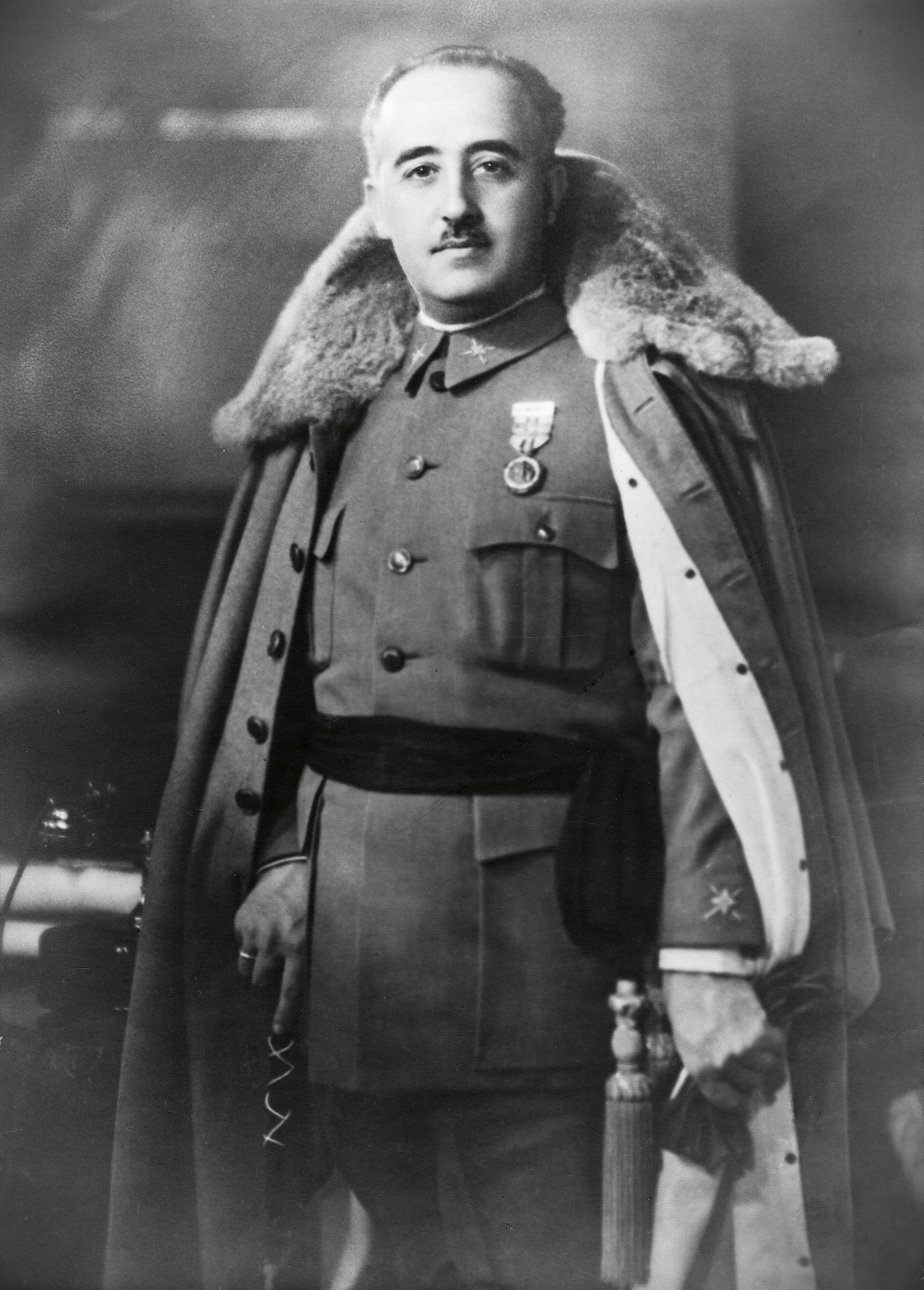
Franco in 1930

On 5 February 1932, Franco was given a command in A Coruña. Franco avoided involvement in José Sanjurjo's attempted coup that year, and even wrote a hostile letter to Sanjurjo expressing his anger over the attempt. As a result of Azaña's military reform, in January 1933 Franco was relegated from first to 24th in the list of brigadiers. The same year, on 17 February he was given the military command of the Balearic Islands. The post was above his rank, but Franco was still unhappy that he was stuck in a position he disliked. The prime minister wrote in his diary that it was probably more prudent to have Franco away from Madrid.

In 1932, the Jesuits, who were in charge of many schools throughout the country, were banned and had all their property confiscated. The army was further reduced, and landowners were expropriated. Home rule was granted to Catalonia, with a local parliament and a president of its own. In June 1933 Pope Pius XI issued the encyclical Dilectissima Nobis (Our Dearly Beloved), "On Oppression of the Church of Spain", in which he criticised the anti-clericalism of the Republican government.

The elections held in October 1933 resulted in a centre-right majority. The political party with the most votes was the Confederación Español de Derechas Autónomas ("CEDA"), but president Alcalá-Zamora declined to invite the leader of the CEDA, Gil Robles, to form a government. Instead, he invited the Radical Republican Party's Alejandro Lerroux to do so. Despite receiving the most votes, CEDA was denied cabinet positions for nearly a year. After a year of intense pressure, CEDA, the largest party in the congress, was finally successful in forcing the acceptance of three ministries. The entrance of CEDA in the government, despite being normal in a parliamentary democracy, was not well accepted by the left. The Socialists triggered an insurrection that they had been preparing for nine months. The leftist Republican parties did not directly join the insurrection, but their leadership issued statements that they were "breaking all relations" with the Republican government. The Catalan Bloc Obrer i Camperol (BOC) advocated the need to form a broad workers' front and took the lead in forming a new and more encompassing Alianza Obrera, which included the Catalan UGT and the Catalan sector of the PSOE, with the goal of defeating fascism and advancing the socialist revolution. The Alianza Obrera declared a general strike "against fascism" in Catalonia in 1934. A Catalan state was proclaimed by Catalan nationalist leader Lluis Companys, but it lasted just ten hours. Despite an attempt at a general stoppage in Madrid, other strikes did not endure. This left the striking Asturian miners to fight alone.

In several mining towns in Asturias, local unions gathered small arms and were determined to see the strike through. It began on the evening of 4 October, with the miners occupying several towns, attacking and seizing local Civil and Assault Guard barracks. Thirty-four priests, six young seminarists with ages between 18 and 21, and several businessmen and civil guards were summarily executed by the revolutionaries in Mieres and Sama, 58 religious buildings including churches, convents and part of the university at Oviedo were burned and destroyed, and over 100 priests were killed in the diocese. Franco, already General of Division and aide to the war minister, Diego Hidalgo, was put in command of the operations directed to suppress the violent insurgency. Troops of the Spanish Army of Africa carried this out, with General Eduardo López Ochoa as commander in the field. After two weeks of heavy fighting (and a death toll estimated between 1,200 and 2,000), the rebellion was suppressed.

The insurgency in Asturias in October 1934 sparked a new era of violent anti-Christian persecutions with the massacre of 34 priests, initiating the practice of atrocities against the clergy, and sharpened the antagonism between Left and Right. Franco and López Ochoa (who, prior to the campaign in Asturias, had been seen as a left-leaning officer) emerged as officers prepared to use "troops against Spanish civilians as if they were a foreign enemy". Franco described the rebellion to a journalist in Oviedo as, "a frontier war and its fronts are socialism, communism and whatever attacks civilisation to replace it with barbarism." Though the colonial units sent to the north by the government at Franco's recommendation consisted of the Spanish Foreign Legion and the Moroccan Regulares Indigenas, the right-wing press portrayed the Asturian rebels as lackeys of a foreign Jewish-Bolshevik conspiracy.

With this rebellion against legitimate established political authority, the socialists also repudiated the representative institutional system as the anarchists had done. The Spanish historian Salvador de Madariaga, an Azaña supporter, and an exiled vocal opponent of Francisco Franco is the author of a sharp critical reflection against the participation of the left in the revolt: "The uprising of 1934 is unforgivable. The argument that Mr Gil Robles tried to destroy the Constitution to establish fascism was, at once, hypocritical and false. With the rebellion of 1934, the Spanish left lost even the shadow of moral authority to condemn the rebellion of 1936."

At the start of the Civil War, López Ochoa was assassinated; his head was severed and paraded around the streets on a pole, with a card reading, 'This is the butcher of Asturias'. Sometime after these events, Franco was briefly commander-in-chief of the Army of Africa (from 15 February onwards), and from 19 May 1935, on, Chief of the General Staff.

==== 1936 general election ====
At the end of 1935, President Alcalá-Zamora manipulated a petty-corruption issue into a major scandal in parliament, and eliminated Alejandro Lerroux, the head of the Radical Republican Party, from the premiership. Subsequently, Alcalá-Zamora vetoed the logical replacement, a majority centre-right coalition, led by the CEDA, which would reflect the composition of the parliament. He then arbitrarily appointed an interim prime minister and after a short period announced the dissolution of parliament and new elections.

Two wide coalitions formed: the Popular Front on the left, ranging from the Republican Union to the communists, and the Frente Nacional on the right, ranging from the centre radicals to the conservative Carlists. On 16 February 1936 the elections ended in a virtual draw, but in the evening leftist mobs started to interfere in the balloting and in the registration of votes, distorting the results. Stanley G. Payne claims that the process was blatant electoral fraud, with widespread violation of the laws and the constitution. In line with Payne's point of view, in 2017 two Spanish scholars, Manuel Álvarez Tardío and Roberto Villa García published the result of a major research work in which they concluded that the 1936 elections were rigged, a view disputed by Paul Preston, and other scholars such as Iker Itoiz Ciáurriz, who denounces their conclusions as revisionist "classic Francoist anti-republican tropes".

On 19 February, the cabinet presided over by Portela Valladares resigned, with a new cabinet being quickly set up, composed chiefly of members of the Republican Left and the Republican Union and presided over by Manuel Azaña.

José Calvo Sotelo, who made anti-communism the focus of his parliamentary speeches, began spreading violent propaganda—advocating for a military coup d'état, formulating a catastrophist discourse of a dichotomous choice between "communism" or a markedly totalitarian "National" State, and setting the mood of the masses for a military rebellion. The diffusion of the myth about an alleged Communist coup d'état as well a pretended state of "social chaos" became pretexts for a coup. Franco himself along with General Emilio Mola had stirred an anti-Communist campaign in Morocco.

On 23 February, Franco was sent to the Canary Islands to serve as the islands' military commander, an appointment perceived by him as a destierro (banishment). Meanwhile, a conspiracy led by General Mola was taking shape.

Interested in the parliamentary immunity granted by a seat at the Cortes, Franco intended to stand as candidate of the Right Bloc alongside José Antonio Primo de Rivera for the by-election in the province of Cuenca programmed for 3 May 1936, after the results of the February 1936 election were annulled in the constituency. But Primo de Rivera refused to run alongside a military officer (Franco in particular) and Franco himself ultimately desisted on 26 April, one day before the decision of the election authority. By that time, PSOE politician Indalecio Prieto had already deemed Franco as a "possible caudillo for a military uprising".

Disenchantment with Azaña's rule continued to grow and was dramatically voiced by Miguel de Unamuno, a republican and one of Spain's most respected intellectuals, who in June 1936 told a reporter who published his statement in El Adelanto that President Manuel Azaña should "...debiera suicidarse como acto patriótico" ("commit suicide as a patriotic act").

In June 1936, Franco was contacted, and a secret meeting was held within La Esperanza forest on Tenerife to discuss starting a military coup. An obelisk (which has subsequently been removed) commemorating this historic meeting was erected at the site in a clearing at Las Raíces in Tenerife.

Outwardly, Franco maintained an ambiguous attitude until nearly July. On 23 June 1936, he wrote to the head of the government, Casares Quiroga, offering to quell the discontent in the Spanish Republican Army, but received no reply. The other rebels were determined to go ahead con Paquito o sin Paquito (with Paquito or without Paquito; Paquito being a diminutive of Paco, which in turn is short for Francisco), as it was put by José Sanjurjo, the honorary leader of the military uprising. After various postponements, 18 July was fixed as the date of the uprising. The situation reached a point of no return and as presented to Franco by Mola, the coup was unavoidable, and he had to choose a side. He decided to join the rebels and was given the task of commanding the Army of Africa. A privately owned DH 89 De Havilland Dragon Rapide, flown by two British pilots, Cecil Bebb and Hugh Pollard, was chartered in England on 11 July to take Franco to Africa.

The coup underway was precipitated by the assassination of the right-wing opposition leader Calvo Sotelo in retaliation for the murder of assault guard José Castillo, which had been committed by a group headed by a civil guard and composed of assault guards and members of the socialist militias. On 17 July, one day earlier than planned, the Army of Africa rebelled, detaining their commanders. On 18 July, Franco published a manifesto and left for Africa, where he arrived the next day to take command.

A week later the rebels, who soon called themselves the Nationalists, controlled a third of Spain; most naval units remained under control of the Republican loyalist forces, which left Franco isolated. The coup had failed in the attempt to bring a swift victory, but the Spanish Civil War had begun.

== From the Spanish Civil War to World War II ==
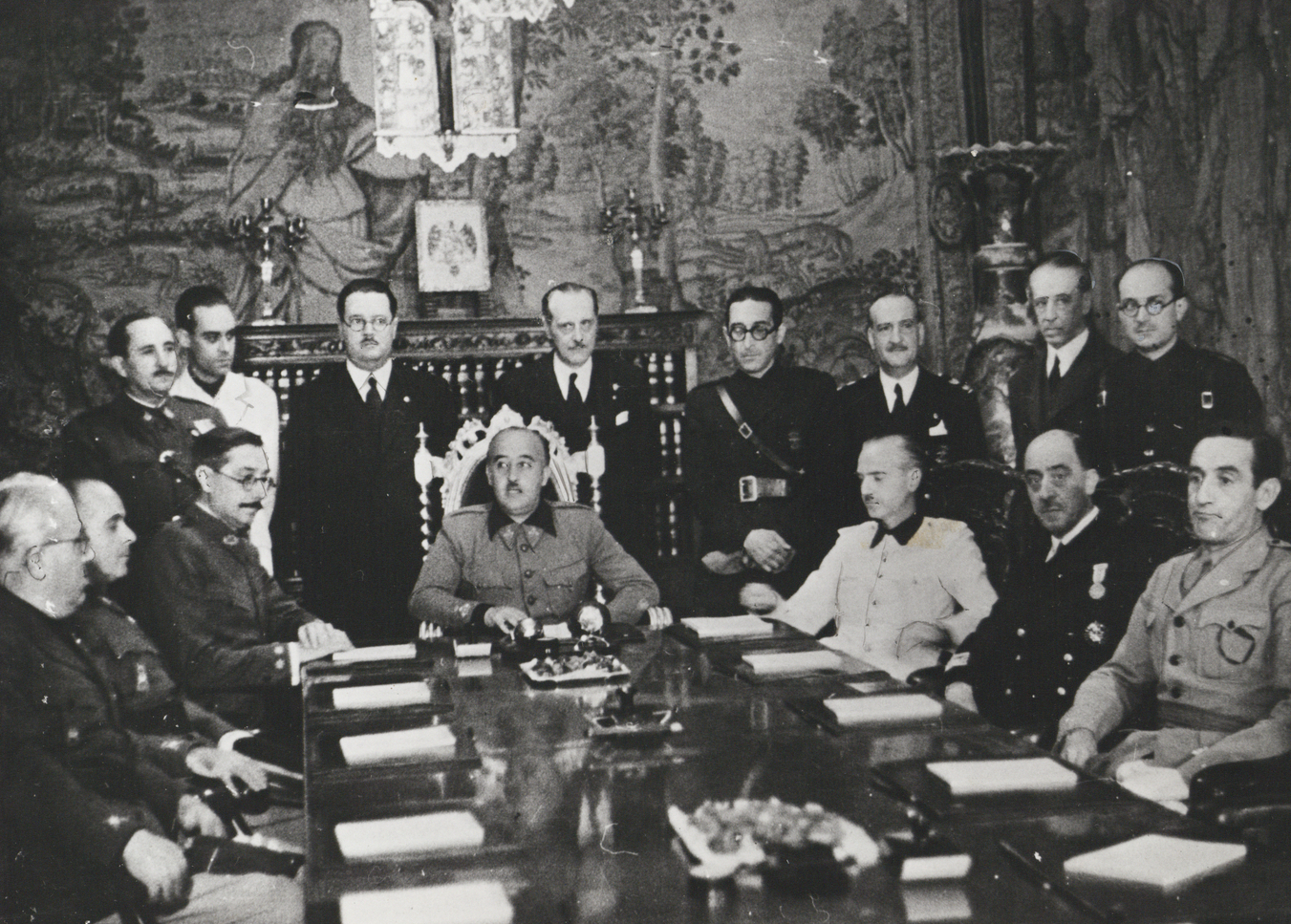
Franco in a meeting of his government, 1939

Franco rose to power during the Spanish Civil War, which began in July 1936 and officially ended with the victory of his Nationalist forces in April 1939. Although it is impossible to calculate precise statistics concerning the Spanish Civil War and its aftermath, Payne writes that if civilian fatalities above the norm are added to the total number of deaths for victims of violence, the number of deaths attributable to the civil war would reach approximately 344,000. During the war, rape, torture, and summary executions committed by soldiers under Franco's command were used as a means of retaliation and to repress political dissent.

The war was marked by foreign intervention on behalf of both sides. Franco's Nationalists were supported by Fascist Italy, which sent the Corpo Truppe Volontarie and by Nazi Germany, which sent the Condor Legion. Italian aircraft stationed on Mallorca bombed Barcelona thirteen times, dropping forty-four tons of bombs aimed at civilians. Similarly, both Italian and German planes bombed the Basque town of Guernica at Franco's request. The Republican opposition was supported by communists, socialists, and anarchists within Spain as well as the Soviet Union and volunteers who fought in the International Brigades.

=== First months ===
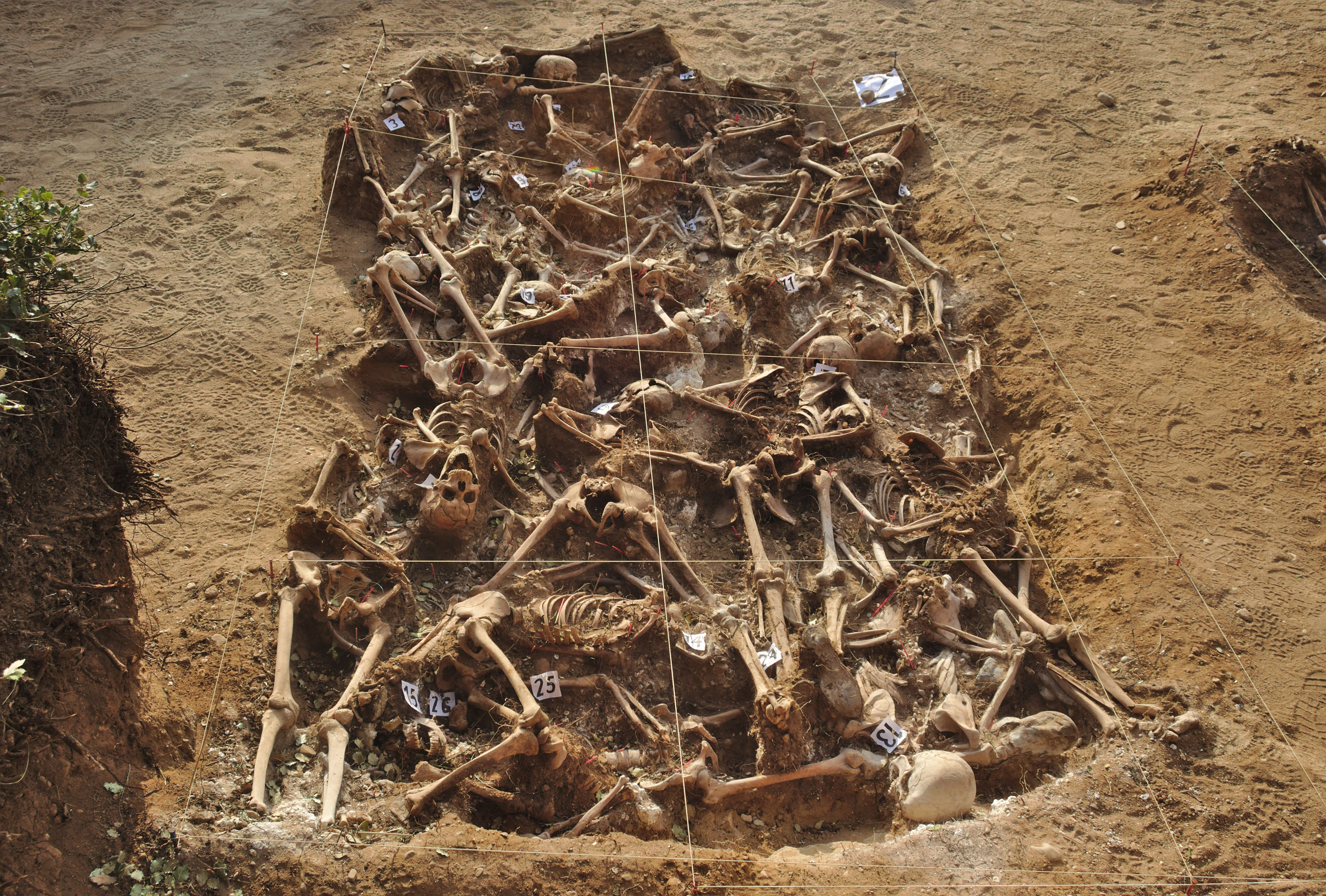
Twenty-six Republicans executed by Francoists at the beginning of the Spanish Civil War, buried in a mass grave at Estépar

Following the pronunciamiento of 18 July 1936, Franco assumed the leadership of the 30,000 soldiers of the Spanish Army of Africa. The first days of the insurgency were marked by an imperative need to secure control over the Spanish Moroccan Protectorate. On one side, Franco had to win the support of the native Moroccan population and their (nominal) authorities, and, on the other, he had to ensure his control over the army. His method was the summary execution of some 200 senior officers loyal to the Republic (one of them was his own cousin). His loyal bodyguard was shot by Manuel Blanco. Franco's first problem was how to move his troops to the Iberian Peninsula, since most units of the Navy had remained in control of the Republic and were blocking the Strait of Gibraltar. He requested help from Benito Mussolini, who responded with an offer of arms and planes. In Germany Wilhelm Canaris, the head of the Abwehr military intelligence service, persuaded Hitler to support the Nationalists; Hitler sent 20 Ju 52 transport aircraft and six Heinkel biplane fighters, on the condition that they were not to be used in hostilities unless the Republicans attacked first. Mussolini sent 12 Savoia-Marchetti SM.81 transport/bombers, and a few fighter aircraft. From 20 July onward Franco was able, with this small squadron of aircraft, to initiate an air bridge that carried 1,500 soldiers of the Army of Africa to Seville, where these troops helped to ensure rebel control of the city. He successfully negotiated with Germany, and Italy for more military support, and above all for more aircraft. On 25 July aircraft began to arrive in Tetouan and on 5 August Franco was able to break the blockade, successfully deploying a convoy of fishing boats and merchant ships carrying some 3,000 soldiers; between 29 July and 15 August about 15,000 more men were moved.

On 26 July, just eight days after the revolt had started, foreign allies of the Republican government convened an international communist conference at Prague to arrange plans to help the Popular Front forces in Spain. Communist parties throughout the world quickly launched a full scale propaganda campaign in support of the Popular Front. The Communist International (Comintern) immediately reinforced its activity, sending to Spain its Secretary-General, the Bulgarian Georgi Dimitrov, and the Italian Palmiro Togliatti, chief of the Communist Party of Italy. From August onward, aid from the Soviet Union began; by February 1937 two ships per day arrived at Spain's Mediterranean ports carrying munitions, rifles, machine guns, hand grenades, artillery, and trucks. With the cargo came Soviet agents, technicians, instructors and propagandists.

The Communist International immediately started to organise the International Brigades, volunteer military units which included the Garibaldi Brigade from Italy and the Lincoln Battalion from the United States. The International Brigades were usually deployed as shock troops, and as a result they suffered high casualties.

In early August, the situation in western Andalucia was stable enough to allow Franco to organise a column (some 15,000 men at its height), under the command of then Lieutenant-Colonel Juan Yagüe, which would march through Extremadura towards Madrid. On 11 August Mérida was taken, and on 15 August Badajoz, thus joining both Nationalist-controlled areas. Additionally, Mussolini ordered a voluntary army, the Corpo Truppe Volontarie (CTV) of fully motorised units (some 12,000 Italians), to Seville, and Hitler added to them a professional squadron from the Luftwaffe (2JG/88) with about 24 planes. All these planes had the Nationalist Spanish insignia painted on them, but were flown by Italian and German nationals. The backbone of Franco's air force in those days was the Italian SM.79 and SM.81 bombers, the biplane Fiat CR.32 fighter and the German Junkers Ju 52 cargo-bomber and the Heinkel He 51 biplane fighter.

On 21 September, with the head of the column at the town of Maqueda (some 80 km away from Madrid), Franco ordered a detour to free the besieged garrison at the Alcázar of Toledo, which was achieved on 27 September. This controversial decision gave the Popular Front time to strengthen its defences in Madrid and hold the city that year, but with Soviet support. Kennan writes that once Stalin had decided to assist the Spanish Republicans, the operation was put in place with remarkable speed and energy. The first load of arms and tanks arrived as early as 26 September and was secretly unloaded at night. Advisers accompanied the armaments. Soviet officers were in effective charge of military operations on the Madrid front. Kennan believes that this operation was originally conducted in good faith with no other purpose than saving the Republic.

Hitler's policy for Spain was shrewd and pragmatic. The minutes of a conference with his foreign minister and army chiefs at the Reich Chancellery in Berlin on 10 November 1937 summarised his views on foreign policy regarding the Spanish Civil War: "On the other hand, a 100 percent victory for Franco was not desirable either, from the German point of view; rather were we interested in a continuance of the war and in the keeping up of the tension in the Mediterranean." Hitler distrusted Franco; according to the comments he made at the conference he wanted the war to continue, but he did not want Franco to achieve total victory. He felt that with Franco in undisputed control of Spain, the possibility of Italy intervening further or of its continuing to occupy the Balearic Islands would be prevented.

By February 1937 the Soviet Union's military help started to taper off, to be replaced by limited economic aid.

=== Rise to power ===
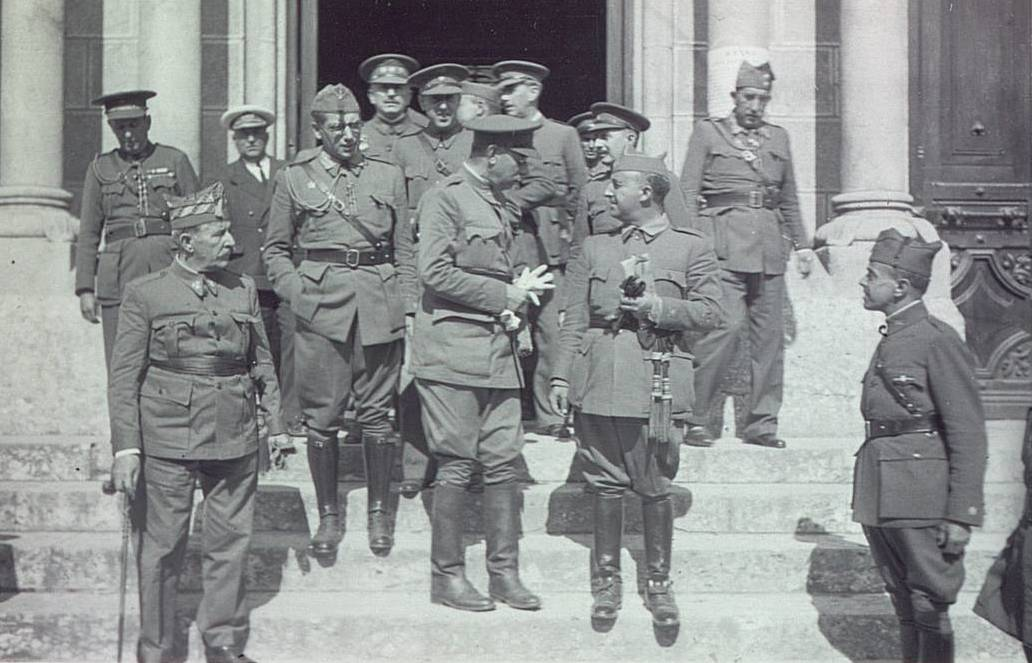
Franco and other Nationalist rebel commanders during the Civil War, c. 1936

The designated leader of the uprising, General José Sanjurjo, died on 20 July 1936 in a plane crash. In the Nationalist zone, "political life ceased". Initially, only military command mattered: this was divided into regional commands: (Emilio Mola in the North, Gonzalo Queipo de Llano in Seville commanding Andalucia, Franco with an independent command, and Miguel Cabanellas in Zaragoza commanding Aragon. The Spanish Army of Morocco was itself split into two columns, one commanded by General Juan Yagüe and the other commanded by Colonel José Varela.

From 24 July a coordinating junta, the National Defence Junta, was established, based at Burgos. Nominally led by Cabanellas, as the most senior general, it initially included Mola, three other generals, and two colonels; Franco was later added in early August. On 21 September it was decided that Franco was to be commander-in-chief (this unified command was opposed only by Cabanellas), and, after some discussion, with no more than a lukewarm agreement from Queipo de Llano and from Mola, also head of government. He was, doubtlessly, helped to this primacy by the fact that in late July Hitler had decided that all of Germany's aid to the Nationalists would go to Franco.

Mola had been somewhat discredited as the main planner of the attempted coup that had now degenerated into a civil war, and was strongly identified with the Carlist monarchists and not at all with the Falange, a party with Fascist leanings and connections ("phalanx", a far-right Spanish political party founded by José Antonio Primo de Rivera), nor did he have good relations with Germany. Queipo de Llano and Cabanellas had both previously rebelled against the government of General Miguel Primo de Rivera and were therefore discredited in some nationalist circles, and Falangist leader José Antonio Primo de Rivera was in prison in Alicante (he would be executed a few months later). The desire to keep a place open for him prevented any other Falangist leader from emerging as a possible head of state. Franco's previous aloofness from politics meant that he had few active enemies in any of the factions that needed to be placated, and he had also cooperated in recent months with both Germany and Italy.

On 1 October 1936, in Burgos, Franco was publicly proclaimed as Generalísimo of the National army and Jefe del Estado (Head of State). When Mola was killed in another air accident a year later on 2 June 1937 (which some believe was an assassination), no military leader was left from those who had organised the conspiracy against the Republic between 1933 and 1935.

=== Military command ===
Franco personally guided military operations from this time until the end of the war. Franco himself was not a strategic genius, but he was very effective at organisation, administration, logistics and diplomacy. After the failed assault on Madrid in November 1936, Franco settled on a piecemeal approach to winning the war, rather than bold manoeuvring. As with his decision to relieve the garrison at Toledo, this approach has been subject of some debate: some of his decisions, such as in June 1938 when he preferred to advance towards Valencia instead of Catalonia, remain particularly controversial from a military strategic viewpoint. Valencia, Castellon and Alicante saw the last Republican troops defeated by Franco.

Although both Germany and Italy provided military support to Franco, the degree of influence of both powers on his direction of the war seems to have been very limited. Nevertheless, the Italian troops, despite not always being effective, were present in most of the large operations in large numbers. Germany sent insignificant numbers of combat personnel to Spain, but aided the Nationalists with technical instructors and modern matériel; including some 200 tanks and 600 aircraft which helped the Nationalist air force dominate the skies for most of the war.

Franco's direction of the German and Italian forces was limited, particularly in the direction of the Condor Legion, but he was by default their supreme commander, and they declined to interfere in the politics of the Nationalist zone. For reasons of prestige it was decided to continue assisting Franco until the end of the war, and Italian and German troops paraded on the day of the final victory in Madrid.

The Nationalist victory could be accounted for by various factors: the Popular Front government had reckless policies in the weeks prior to the war, where it ignored potential dangers and alienated the opposition, encouraging more people to join the rebellion, while the rebels had superior military cohesion, with Franco providing the necessary leadership to consolidate power and unify the various rightist factions. His foreign diplomacy secured military aid from Italy and Germany and, by some accounts, helped keep Britain and France out of the war.

The rebels made effective use of a smaller navy, acquiring the most powerful ships in the Spanish fleet and maintaining a functional officer corps, while Republican sailors had assassinated a large number of their naval officers who sided with the rebels in 1936, as at Cartagena, and El Ferrol. The Nationalists used their ships aggressively to pursue the opposition, in contrast to the largely passive naval strategy of the Republicans.

Not only did the Nationalists receive more foreign aid to sustain their war effort, but there is evidence that they made more efficient use of such aid. They augmented their forces with arms captured from the Republicans, and successfully integrated over half of Republican prisoners of war into the Nationalist army. The rebels were able to build a larger air force and make more effective use of their air force, particularly in supporting ground operations and bombing; and generally enjoyed air superiority from mid-1937 onwards; this air power contributed greatly to the Nationalist victory.

The Republicans were subject to disunity and infighting, and were hampered by the destructive consequences of the revolution in the Republican zone: mobilisation was impeded, the Republican image was harmed abroad in democracies, and the campaign against religion aroused overwhelming and unwavering Catholic support for the Nationalists.

=== Political command ===
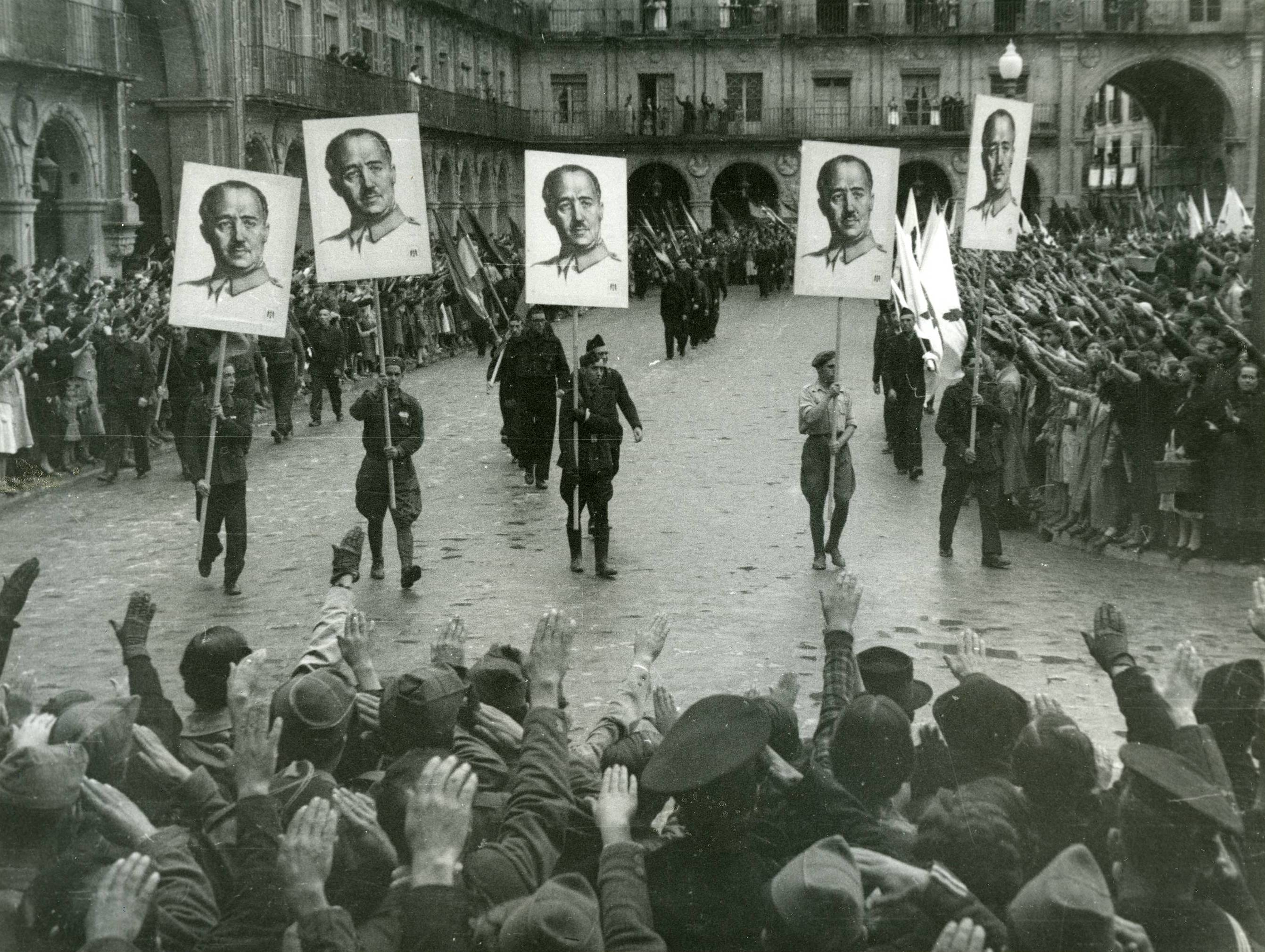
Francoist demonstration in Salamanca (1937) with the paraders carrying banners with the portrait of Franco and the populace giving the Roman salute

On 19 April 1937, Franco and Ramón Serrano Súñer, the brother-in-law of Franco's wife, Carmen Polo, who became Franco's advisor on Falangist party matters, with the acquiescence of Generals Mola and Quiepo de Llano, forcibly merged the ideologically distinct national-syndicalist Falange and the Carlist monarchist parties into one party under his rule, dubbed Falange Española Tradicionalista y de las Juntas de Ofensiva Nacional-Sindicalista (FET y de las JONS), which became the only legal party in the Nationalist zone. Serrano Súñer and a group of his followers dominated the FET JONS, and strove to increase the party's power. Serrano Súñer tried to move the party in a more fascist direction by appointing his acolytes to important positions, and the party became the leading political organisation in Francoist Spain. The FET JONS failed to establish a fascist party regime, however, and was relegated to subordinate status. Franco placed the Carlist Manuel Fal Condé under house arrest and imprisoned hundreds of old Falangists, the so-called "old shirts" (camisas viejas), including the party leader Manuel Hedilla, to help secure his political future. Franco also appeased the Carlists by exploiting the Republicans' anti-clericalism in his propaganda, in particular concerning the "Martyrs of the war". While the Republican forces presented the war as a struggle to defend the Republic against fascism, Franco depicted himself as the defender of "Catholic Spain" against "atheist communism". As the new head of the Falange, Franco presented himself as the direct successor to its founder Jose Antonio Primo de Rivera and justified his actions as completing his work. Falangism and its party linked Franco with fascism, permitting Franco to be recognised as a fascist leader.

Unlike some other fascist movements, the Falangists had developed an official program in 1934, the "Twenty-Seven Points". In 1937, Franco assumed as the tentative doctrine of his regime 26 out of the original 27 points. Franco made himself jefe nacional (National Chief) of the new FET (Falange Española Tradicionalista; Traditionalist Spanish Phalanx) with a secretary, Political Junta and National Council to be named subsequently by himself. Five days later on 24 April the raised-arm salute of the Falange was made the official salute of the Nationalist regime. Also in 1937 the Marcha Real ("Royal March") was restored by decree as the national anthem in the Nationalist zone. It was opposed by the Falangists, who associated it with the monarchy and boycotted it when it was played, often singing their own anthem, Cara al Sol (Facing the Sun) instead. Similarly to Italy, the anthem of the monarchy remained the official anthem, while Cara al Sol, the anthem of the fascist party, became the unofficial anthem of the regime. By 1939 the fascist style prevailed, with ritual rallying calls of "Franco, Franco, Franco."

=== End of the Civil War ===
By early 1939 only Madrid (see History of Madrid), Barcelona and Catalan, and a few other areas remained under control of the government forces. Franco's troops captured Barcelona in January 1939.

On 27 February Chamberlain's Britain and Daladier's France officially recognised the Franco regime. On 28 March 1939, with the help of pro-Franco forces inside the city (the "fifth column" General Mola had mentioned in propaganda broadcasts in 1936), Madrid fell to the Nationalists. The next day, Valencia, which had held out under the guns of the Nationalists for close to two years, also surrendered. Victory was proclaimed on 1 April 1939, when the last of the Republican forces surrendered. On the same day, Franco placed his sword upon the altar of a church and vowed to never take it up again unless Spain itself was threatened with invasion.

Although Germany had recognised the Franco Government, Franco's policy towards Germany was extremely cautious until spectacular German victories at the beginning of the Second World War. An early indication that Franco was going to keep his distance from Germany soon proved true. A rumoured state visit by Franco to Germany did not take place and a further rumour of a visit by Goering to Spain, after he had enjoyed a cruise in the Western Mediterranean, again did not materialise. Instead Goering had to return to Berlin.

During the Civil War and in the aftermath, a period known as the White Terror took place. This saw mass executions of Republican and other Nationalist enemies, standing in contrast to the wartime Red Terror. Historical analysis and investigations estimate the number of executions by the Franco regime during this time to be between 100,000 and 200,000 dead.

Stanley G. Payne says the total number of all kinds of executions in the Republican zone added up to about 56,000, and that those in the Nationalist zone probably amounted to at least 70,000, with an additional 28,000 executions after the war ended. Searches conducted with parallel excavations of mass graves in Spain by the Association for the Recovery of Historical Memory (Asociación para la Recuperación de la Memoria Histórica), (ARMH) estimate that more than 35,000 people killed by the Nationalist side are still missing in mass graves.

Julián Casanova Ruiz, who was nominated in 2008 to join the panel of experts in the first judicial investigation, conducted by judge Baltasar Garzón, of Francoist crimes, as well as historians Josep Fontana and Hugh Thomas, estimate deaths in the White Terror to be around 150,000 in total. According to Paul Preston, while "130,199" remains "the currently most reliable" figure of civilian executions took place in the Francoist area during the war, "it is unlikely" that it was less than 150,000, (Note: The more than 150,000 executions for political reasons was ten times the number of those in Nazi Germany and 1,000 times the number in Fascist Italy. Reig Tapia points out that Franco signed more decrees of execution than any other previous head of state in Spain.) with 50,000 victims in the Republican area, in addition to approximately 20,000 Republicans executed by the Franco regime after the end of the war. According to Helen Graham, the Spanish working classes became to the Francoist project what the Jews were to the German Volksgemeinschaft.

According to Gabriel Jackson and Antony Beevor, the number of victims of the "White Terror" (executions and hunger or illness in prisons) between 1939 and 1943 was 200,000. Beevor "reckons Franco's ensuing 'white terror' claimed 200,000 lives. The 'red terror' had already killed 38,000." Julius Ruiz concludes that "although the figures remain disputed, a minimum of 37,843 executions were carried out in the Republican zone with a maximum of 150,000 executions (including 50,000 after the war) in Nationalist Spain." According to Michael Richards, "as many as 200,000" people were executed by Francoists after the war.

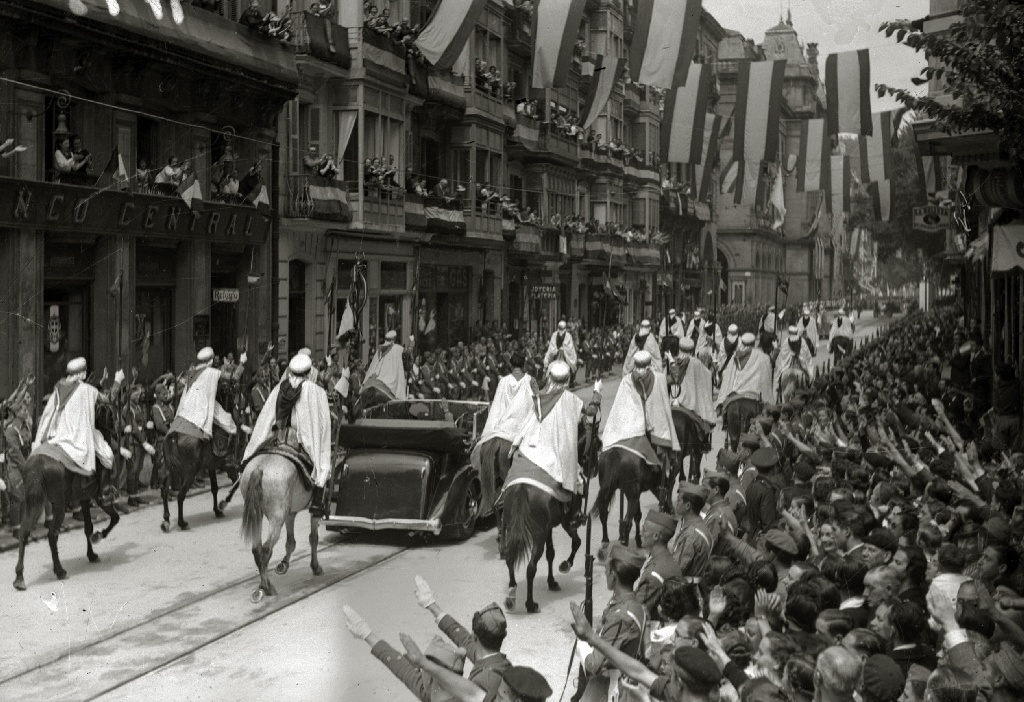
Franco arriving in San Sebastián in 1939, escorted by the Moorish Guard

Despite the end of the war, Spanish guerrillas exiled in France, and known as the "Maquis", continued to resist Franco in the Pyrenees, carrying out sabotage and robberies against the Francoist regime. Several exiled Republicans also fought in the French resistance against the German occupation in Vichy France during World War II. In 1944, a group of republican veterans from the French resistance invaded the Val d'Aran in northwest Catalonia but were quickly defeated. The activities of the Maquis continued well into the 1950s.

The end of the war led to hundreds of thousands of exiles, mostly to France, but also to Mexico, Chile, Cuba, and the United States. On the other side of the Pyrenees, refugees were confined in internment camps in France, such as Camp Gurs or Camp Vernet, where 12,000 Republicans were housed in squalid conditions (mostly soldiers from the Durruti Division). The 17,000 refugees housed in Gurs were divided into four categories: Brigadists, pilots, Gudaris and ordinary "Spaniards". The Gudaris (Basques) and the pilots easily found local backers and jobs, and were allowed to quit the camp, but the farmers and ordinary people, who could not find relations in France, were encouraged by the French government, in agreement with the Francoist government, to return to Spain. The great majority did so and were turned over to the Francoist authorities in Irún. From there they were transferred to the Miranda de Ebro concentration camp for "purification" according to the Law of Political Responsibilities.

After the proclamation by Marshal Philippe Pétain of the Vichy France regime, the refugees became political prisoners, and the French police attempted to round up those who had been liberated from the camp. Along with other "undesirables", they were sent to the Drancy internment camp before being deported to Nazi Germany. 4,427 Spaniards thus died in Mauthausen concentration camp. The Chilean poet Pablo Neruda, who had been named by the Chilean President Pedro Aguirre Cerda special consul for immigration in Paris, was given responsibility for what he called "the noblest mission I have ever undertaken": shipping more than 2,000 Spanish refugees, who had been housed by the French in squalid camps, to Chile on an old cargo ship, the Winnipeg.

=== World War II ===
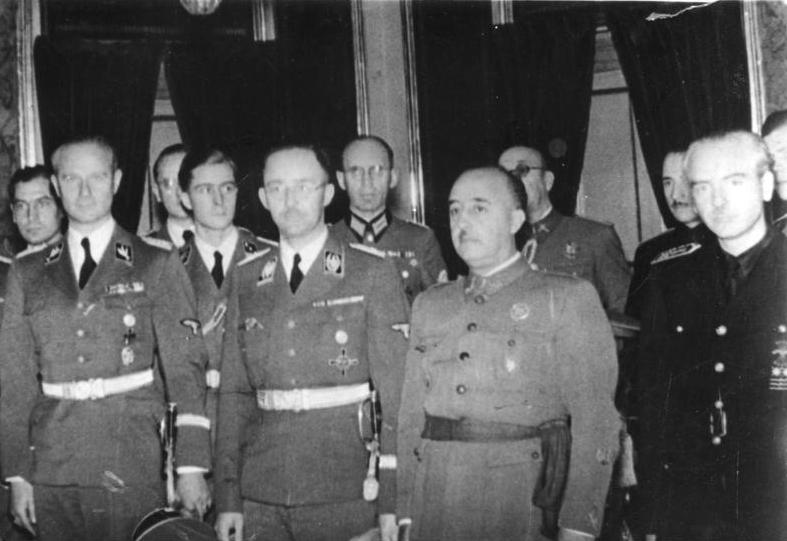
Front row in order from left to right: Karl Wolff, Heinrich Himmler, Franco and Spain's Foreign Minister Serrano Súñer in Madrid, during Himmler's visit to Spain, October 1940

Franco and Adolf Hitler in Meeting at Hendaye, 1940

In September 1939, World War II began. Franco had received important support from Adolf Hitler and Benito Mussolini during the Spanish Civil War, and he had signed the Anti-Comintern Pact. He made pro-Axis speeches, while offering various kinds of support to Italy and Germany. His spokesman Antonio Tovar commented at a Paris conference entitled 'Bolshevism versus Europe' that "Spain aligned itself definitively on the side of...National Socialist Germany and Fascist Italy." However, Franco was reluctant to enter the war due to Spain recovering from its recent civil war and instead pursued a policy of "non-belligerence".

On 23 October 1940, Hitler and Franco met in Hendaye, France to discuss the possibility of Spain's entry on the side of the Axis. Franco's demands, including large supplies of food and fuel, as well as Spanish control of Gibraltar and French North Africa, proved too much for Hitler. At the time Hitler did not want to risk damaging his relations with the new Vichy French government. (An oft-cited remark attributed to Hitler is that the German leader said that he would rather have some of his own teeth pulled out than to have to personally deal further with Franco.)

Some historians argue that Franco made demands he knew Hitler would not accede to, in order to stay out of the war. Other historians argue that Franco, as the leader of a destroyed and bankrupt country in chaos following a brutal three-year civil war, simply had little to offer the Axis and that the Spanish armed forces were not ready for a major war. It has also been suggested that Franco decided not to join the war after the resources he requested from Hitler in October 1940 were not forthcoming.

Franco allowed Spanish soldiers to volunteer to fight in the German Army against the Soviet Union (the Blue Division) but forbade Spaniards to fight in the West against the democracies. Franco's common ground with Hitler was particularly weakened by Hitler's attempts to manipulate Christianity, which went against Franco's fervent commitment to defending Catholicism. Contributing to the disagreement was an ongoing dispute over German mining rights in Spain.

According to some scholars, after the Fall of France in June 1940, Spain did adopt a pro-Axis stance (for example, German and Italian ships and U-boats were allowed to use Spanish naval facilities) before returning to a more neutral position in late 1943 when the tide of the war had turned decisively against the Axis Powers, and Italy had changed sides. Franco was initially keen to join the war before the UK could be defeated.

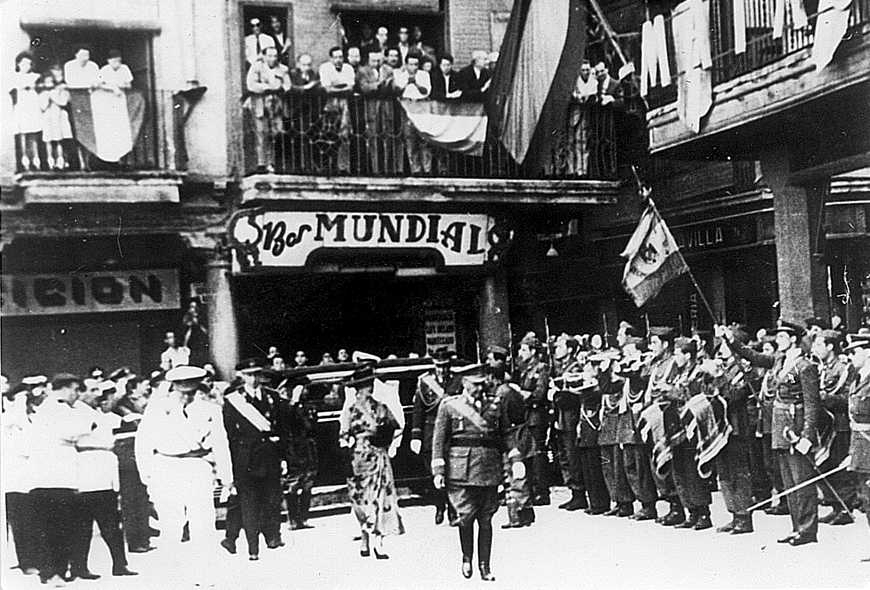
Franco in Reus, 1940

In the winter of 1940 and 1941, Franco toyed with the idea of a "Latin Bloc" formed by Spain, Portugal, Vichy France, the Vatican and Italy, without much consequence. Franco had cautiously decided to enter the war on the Axis side in June 1940, and to prepare his people for war, an anti-British and anti-French campaign was launched in the Spanish media that demanded French Morocco, Cameroon and Gibraltar. On 19 June 1940, Franco pressed along a message to Hitler saying he wanted to enter the war, but Hitler was annoyed at Franco's demand for the French colony of Cameroon, which had been German before World War I, and which Hitler was planning on taking back for Plan Z. Franco seriously considered blocking allied access to the Mediterranean Sea by invading British-held Gibraltar, but he abandoned the idea after learning that the plan would have likely failed due to Gibraltar being too heavily defended. In addition, declaring war on the UK and its allies would no doubt give them an opportunity to capture both the Canary Islands and Spanish Morocco, as well as possibly launch an invasion of mainland Spain itself. Franco was aware that his air force would be quickly defeated if going into action against the Royal Air Force, and the Royal Navy would easily be able to destroy Spain's small navy and blockade the entire Spanish coast to prevent imports of crucial materials such as oil. Spain depended on oil imports from the United States, which were almost certain to be cut off if Spain formally joined the Axis.

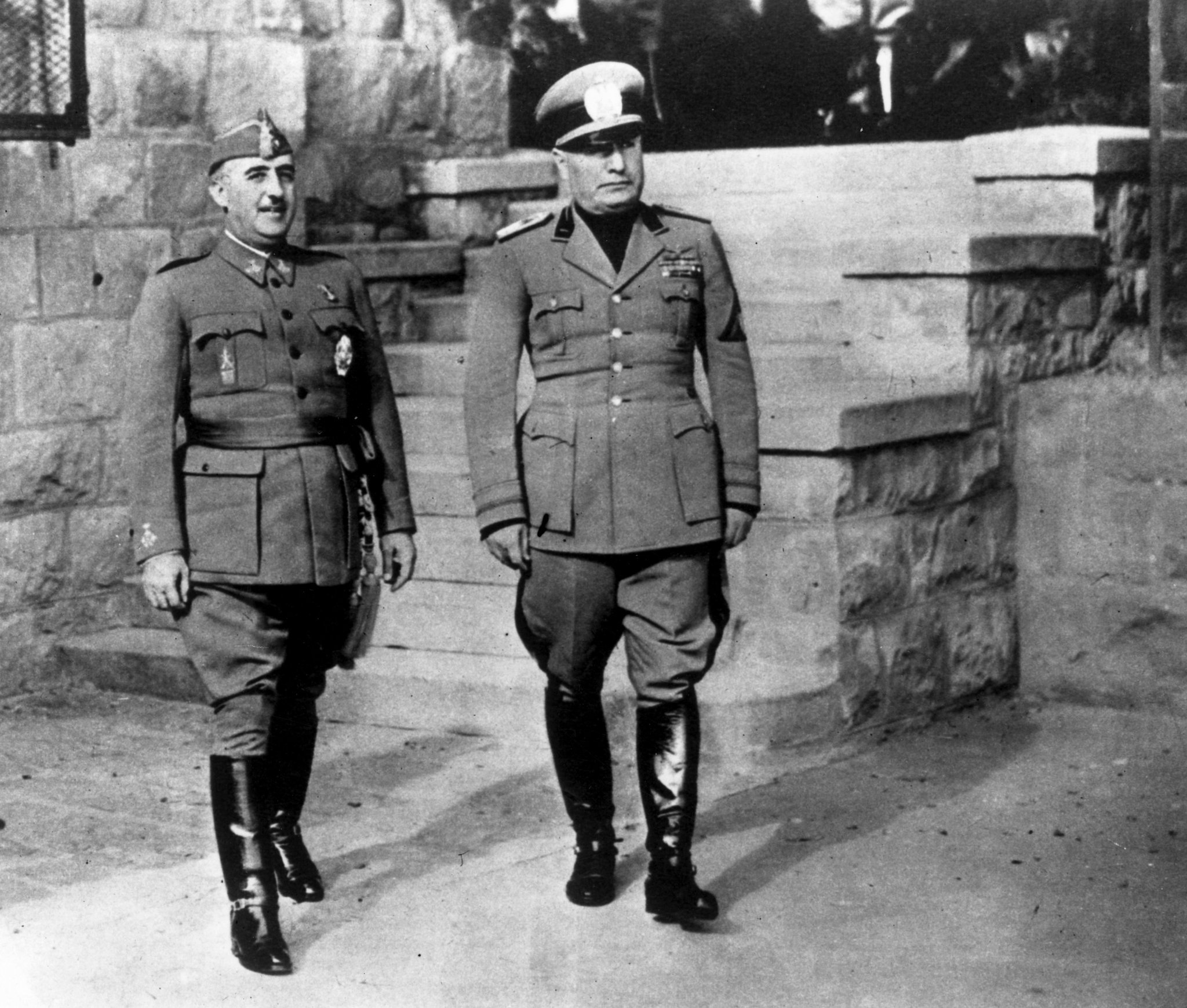
Franco with Italian leader Benito Mussolini in 1941

Franco and his foreign minister Ramón Serrano Suñer held a meeting with Mussolini and Ciano in Bordighera, Italy on 12 February 1941. However, an affected Mussolini did not appear to be interested in Franco's help due to the defeats his forces had suffered in North Africa and the Balkans, and he even told Franco that he wished he could find any way to leave the war. When the invasion of the Soviet Union began on 22 June 1941, Serrano Suñer immediately suggested the formation of a unit of military volunteers to join the invasion. Volunteer Spanish troops (the División Azul, or "Blue Division") fought on the Eastern Front under German command from 1941 to 1944. Some historians have argued that not all of the Blue Division were true volunteers and that Franco expended relatively small but significant resources to aid the Axis powers' battle against the Soviet Union.

Franco was initially disliked by Cuban president Fulgencio Batista, who, during World War II, suggested a joint US-Latin American declaration of war on Spain to overthrow Franco's regime.

Hitler may not have really wanted Spain to join the war, as he needed neutral harbours to import materials from countries in Latin America and elsewhere. He felt Spain would be a burden as it would be dependent on Germany for help. By 1941, Vichy French forces were proving their effectiveness in North Africa, reducing the need for Spanish help, and Hitler was wary about opening up a new front on the western coast of Europe as he struggled to reinforce the Italians in Greece and Yugoslavia. Franco signed a revised Anti-Comintern Pact on 25 November 1941. Spain continued to be able to obtain valuable German goods, including military equipment, as part of payment for Spanish raw materials, and traded wolfram with Germany until August 1944 when the Germans withdrew from the Spanish frontier.

Spanish neutrality during World War II was publicly acknowledged by leading Allied statesmen. In November 1942, US President Roosevelt wrote to General Franco: "...your nation and mine are friends in the best sense of the word." In May 1944, Winston Churchill stated in the House of Commons: "In the dark days of the war the attitude of the Spanish Government in not giving our enemies passage through Spain was extremely helpful to us.... I must say that I shall always consider that a service was rendered...by Spain, not only to the United Kingdom and to the British Empire and Commonwealth, but to the cause of the United Nations." According to the personal recollection of US Ambassador to Spain Carlton Hayes, similar gratitude was also expressed by the Provisional French Government at Algiers in 1943. Franco placed no obstacles to Britain's construction of a large air base extending from Gibraltar into Spanish territorial waters and welcomed the Anglo-American landings in North Africa. Spain did not intern any of the 1,200 American airmen who were forced to land in the country, but "gave them refuge and permitted them to leave."

On 14 June 1940, Spanish forces in Morocco occupied Tangier (a city under international control) and did not leave until the war's end in 1945.

After the war, the Spanish government tried to destroy all evidence of its cooperation with the Axis and allowed many former Nazis, such as Otto Skorzeny and Léon Degrelle, and other fascists, to seek political asylum in Spain.

=== Jews and anti-Semitism ===
Franco had a controversial association with Jews before and during World War II.

When Franco's troops captured Barcelona in January 1939, the city's two synagogues were ransacked and bolted shut. With the fall of the republic, under Franco's regime all the Jews who had come to Spain after 1931 were expelled, and Jewish children were barred from attending public schools. Imprisoned Republicans were forced to read the antisemitic and fabricated propaganda of The Protocols of the Elders of Zion.

Franco made antisemitic remarks in a speech in May 1939, and made similar remarks on at least six occasions during World War II. Franco believed in the existence of a "Jewish-Masonic-Bolshevik conspiracy", and he deliberately framed the Spanish Civil War as a conflict against Jews and Bolsheviks.

In 2010, documents were discovered showing that on 13 May 1941, Franco had ordered his provincial governors to compile a list of Jews while he negotiated an alliance with the Axis powers. Franco supplied Reichsführer-SS Heinrich Himmler, architect of the Nazis' Final Solution, with a list of 6,000 Jews in Spain.

Contrarily, according to Anti-Semitism: A Historical Encyclopedia of Prejudice and Persecution (2005):

Throughout the war, Franco rescued many Jews. ... Just how many Jews were saved by Franco's government during World War II is a matter of historical controversy. Franco has been credited with saving anywhere from approximately 30,000 to 60,000 Jews; most reliable estimates suggest 45,000 is a likely figure.

Preston writes that, in the post-war years, "a myth was carefully constructed to claim that Franco's regime had saved many Jews from extermination" as a means to deflect foreign criticism away from allegations of active collaboration with the Nazi regime. As early as 1943, the Ministry of Foreign Affairs concluded that the Allies were likely to win the war. José Félix de Lequerica y Erquiza became Foreign Minister in 1944 and soon developed an "obsession" with the importance of the "Jewish card" in relations with the former Allied powers.

Spain provided visas for thousands of French Jews to transit Spain en route to Portugal to escape the Nazis. Spanish diplomats protected about 4,000 Jews living in Hungary, Romania, Bulgaria, Czechoslovakia, and Austria. At least some 20,000 to 30,000 Jews were allowed to pass through Spain in the first half of the War. Jews who were not allowed to enter Spain, however, were sent to the Miranda de Ebro concentration camp or deported to France.

In January 1943, after the German embassy in Spain told the Spanish government that it had two months to remove its Jewish citizens from Western Europe, Spain severely limited visas, and only 800 Jews were allowed to enter the country.

After the war, Franco exaggerated his contributions to saving Jews in order to improve Spain's image in the world and end its international isolation.

Under the pseudonym Jakim Boor, Franco praised the Protocols for exposing "the Talmudic doctrines and their conspiracy to seize the levers of power in society." He also dismissed the Holocaust as "a handful of Jews falling foul of race laws."

In the late 1940s and early 1950s, Franco did not recognise Israeli statehood, and maintained strong relations with the Arab world. Israel expressed disinterest in establishing relations, although there were some informal economic ties between the two countries in the later years of Franco's governance. In the aftermath of the Six-Day War in 1967, Franco's Spain was able to utilise its positive relationship with Egyptian President Gamal Abdel Nasser and the Arab world (due to not having recognised the Israeli state) to allow 800 Egyptian Jews, many of Sephardic ancestry, safe passage out of Egypt on Spanish passports. This was undertaken through Francoist Spain's Ambassador to Egypt, Ángel Sagaz Zubelzu, on the understanding that emigrant Jews would not immediately emigrate to Israel and that they would not publicly use the case as political propaganda against Nasser's Egypt. On 16 December 1968, the Spanish government formally revoked the 1492 Edict of Expulsion against Spain's Jewish population.

Franco and many in the government openly stated that they believed there was an international conspiracy of Freemasons and Communists against Spain, sometimes including Jews or "Judeo-Masonry" as part of this. Franco was a staunch Catholic integralist, and under his rule the Spanish government explicitly endorsed the Catholic Church as the religion of the nation state and did not endorse liberal ideas such as religious pluralism or separation of Church and State found in the Republican Constitution of 1931. Catholic doctrine was integrated into university education as part of the Franco regime's move to impose Catholicism into Spanish society. Following the Second World War, the government enacted the "Spanish Bill of Rights" (Fuero de los Españoles), which extended the right to private worship of non-Catholic religions, including Judaism, though it did not permit the erection of religious buildings for this practice and did not allow non-Catholic public ceremonies. With the pivot of Spain's foreign policy towards the United States during the Cold War, the situation changed with the 1967 Law on Religious Freedom, which granted full public religious rights to non-Catholics.

In 1978, three years after Franco's death, with the new Constitution of Spain, the overthrow of Catholicism as the explicit state religion of Spain and the establishment of state-sponsored religious pluralism would be realised in Spain.

== Francoist Spain ==
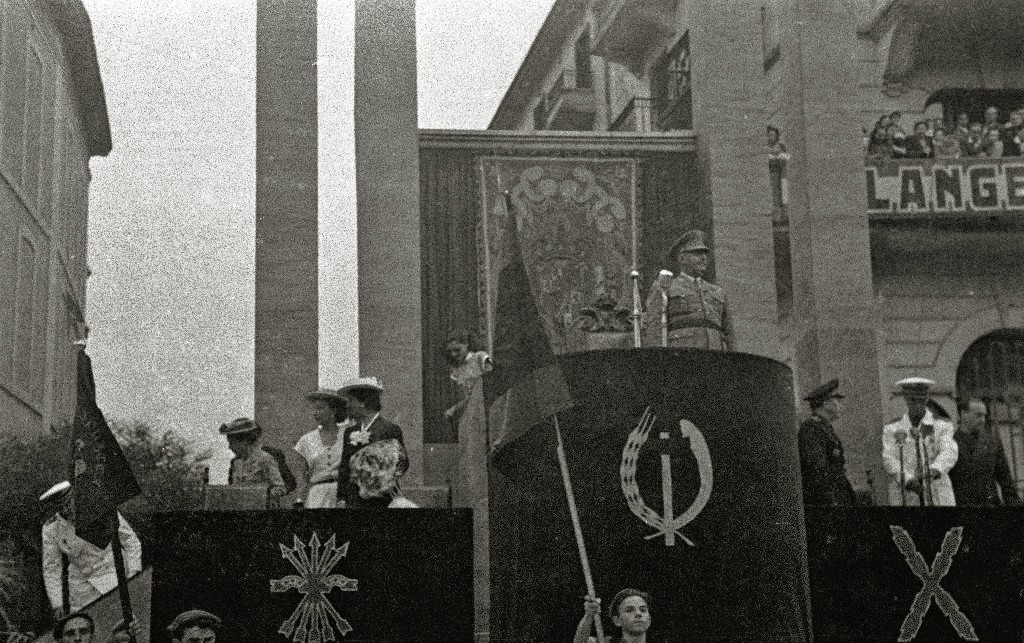
Franco visiting Tolosa, 1948

Franco was recognised as the Spanish head of state by the United Kingdom, France, and Argentina in February 1939. Already proclaimed Generalísimo of the Nationalists and Jefe del Estado (Head of State) in October 1936, he thereafter assumed the official title of "Su Excelencia el Jefe de Estado" ("His Excellency the Head of State"). He was also referred to in state and official documents as "Caudillo de España" ("the Leader of Spain"), and sometimes called "el Caudillo de la Última Cruzada y de la Hispanidad" ("the Leader of the Last Crusade and of the Hispanic heritage") and "el Caudillo de la Guerra de Liberación contra el Comunismo y sus Cómplices" ("the Leader of the War of Liberation Against Communism and Its Accomplices").

On paper, Franco had more power than any Spanish leader before or since. For the first four years after taking Madrid, he ruled almost exclusively by decree. The "Law of the Head of State," passed in August 1939, "permanently confided" all governing power to Franco; he was not required to even consult the cabinet for most legislation or decrees. According to Payne, Franco possessed far more day-to-day power than Hitler or Stalin possessed at the respective heights of their power. He noted that while Hitler and Stalin maintained rubber-stamp parliaments, this was not the case in Spain in the early years after the war – a situation that nominally made Franco's regime "the most purely arbitrary in the world".

This changed in 1942, when Franco convened a parliament known as the Cortes Españolas. It was elected in accordance with corporatist principles, and had little real power. Notably, it had no control over government spending, and the government was not responsible to it; ministers were appointed and dismissed by Franco alone.

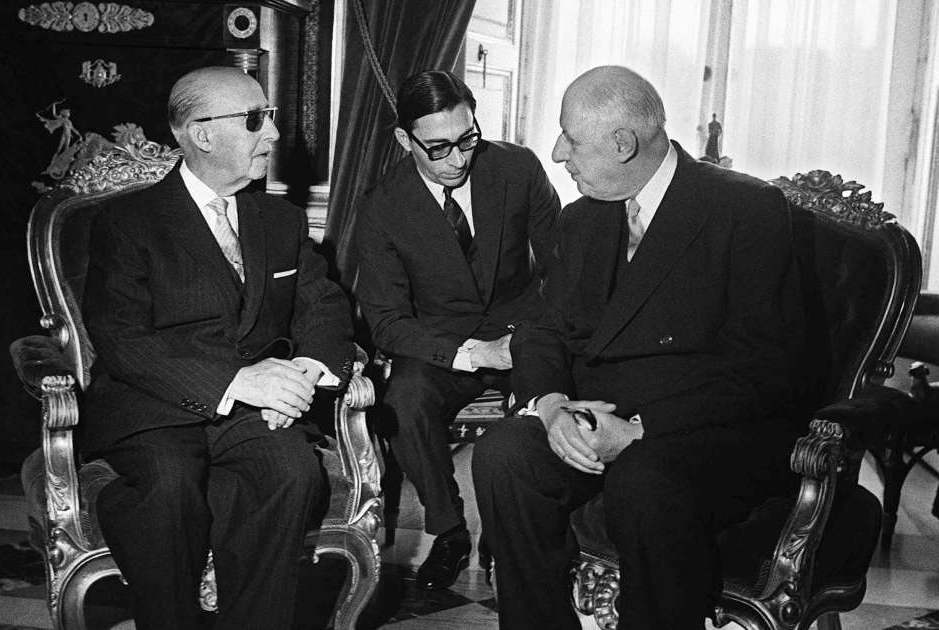
Franco with former French President Charles de Gaulle at his Pardo residence near Madrid, 1970

With the end of World War II, Spain suffered from the consequences of its isolation from the international economy. Spain was excluded from the Marshall Plan, unlike other neutral countries in Europe. This situation ended in part when, in the light of Cold War tensions and of Spain's strategic location, the United States of America entered into a trade and military alliance with Franco. This historic alliance commenced with the visit of US President Dwight D. Eisenhower to Spain in 1953, which resulted in the Pact of Madrid. Spain was then admitted to the United Nations in 1955. American military facilities in Spain built since then include Naval Station Rota, Morón Air Base, and Torrejón Air Base.

On 26 July 1947, Franco proclaimed Spain a monarchy, but did not designate a monarch. This gesture was largely done to appease the monarchists in the Movimiento Nacional (Carlists and Alfonsoists). Franco left the throne vacant, proclaiming himself as a de facto regent for life. At the same time, Franco appropriated many of the privileges of a king. He wore the uniform of a captain general (a rank traditionally reserved for the king) and resided in El Pardo Palace. In addition he began walking under a canopy, and his portrait appeared on most Spanish coins and postage stamps. He also added "by the grace of God", a phrase usually part of the styles of monarchs, to his style.

Franco initially sought support from various groups. His administration marginalised fascist ideologues in favour of technocrats, many of whom were linked with Opus Dei, who promoted economic modernisation.

=== Francoism and fascism ===
Franco's regime exhibited certain elements of fascism, characterised as trappings, or as essential similarities with fascist regimes in culture, politics and social sphere. The Oxford Living Dictionary and Oxford's A Dictionary of Philosophy present Franco's regime as an example of fascism. Paul Preston, who views Francoism as the Spanish variant of fascism, describes Franco's personal beliefs as "deeply conservative" shaped by a mentality of a colonial officer rather than the ones of Benito Mussolini, "the only absolutely indisputable fascist leader", and characterizes Franco as "something much worse" than a fascist in Franco's readiness, in Franco's own words, to "shoot half of Spain." Stanley G. Payne argued that very few scholars consider Franco to be a "core fascist", but at the same time, according to Payne, Franco accepted "the greater part" of Falangist program, although did not become a "genuine Falangist" in the way that he disagreed on "social and economic radicalism" of the pre-war Falange. Richard Griffiths argues that a distinction between fascism and Franco's conservatism would not be understood neither by Franco himself nor his contemporaries. Albanese and del Hierro note that while Franco was not a "complete fascist" in the way the radicals of the Falange were ones, he seemingly sympathized with fascism and shared its ideas, what may explain his regime supporting fascists and neo-fascism for a significant period even after 1945: at first, Franco and his officials helped a number of fascists, including war criminals like Ante Pavelić and Otto Skorzeny, flee Italy and Germany to avoid persecution and participated in creation of "ratlines"; by 1951, Spain established the ties with the Italian Social Movement (MSI), the party of the surviving Fascists - now, neo-Fascists - and started financing it. Franco's Falange along with the MSI joined the neo-fascist European Social Movement. This cooperation continued even in the 1960s. According to such historians as Preston, Julián Casanova, and Ferran Gallego, the Nationalists from conservatives to fascists acted as a unified movement, underwent fascisation and radicalisation in the course of the war and shared a common ideological culture which led to them establishing, according to these historians, fascism in Spain. The politics of the rebel army headed by Franco, according to Preston, became "undistinguishable" from fascism during the war. Franco himself during the war used the radical fascist ideology of Falangism in construction of his regime, taking the Falange as the base for his party FET-JONS and presenting himself as the direct successor to Jose Antonio Primo de Rivera, the founder of the Falange who gained a posthumous personality cult in Francoist Spain of a martyr and the embodiment of the "New Spain". Franco presented himself as completing the work that the young Jose Antonio had begun, becoming recognised as a fascist leader.

Franco's regime has been described in broad definitions: as a fascist regime, as a personalist dictatorship with fascist elements, or as a traditional military dictatorship. It has also been variously presented as a "fascistized dictatorship", or a "semi-fascist regime" which underwent a phase which may be characterised as totalitarian or quasi-totalitarian and fascist or quasi-fascist. Francisco Cobo Romero writes that, besides neutering left-wing advances by using an essentially antiliberal brand of ultranationalism, "in its attempt to emulate Fascism, Francoism resorted to the sacralization and mystification of the motherland, raising it into an object of cult, and coating it with a liturgic divinization of its leader". Recent authors point out that Franco's core myth was essentially similar to the one of fascism: it emerged in the Spanish Civil War which it defined as the Crusade, as a mass cleansing and rebirth of the Spanish nation, and until its end it was relying on the ideal mythical figure of the "New Man" as "Crusader knight" to serve as the model for the Spaniards. Preston writes that the regime was fascist not only by its culture and aesthetics and politics, but also by its social functions, which included the defense of capitalism and its "fostering" in a revolutionary crisis that needed to be resolved through suppression and dismantling workers' movements and a democratic parliamentary system.

All in all, some authors have pointed at a purported artificialness and failure of FET JONS in order to de-emphasise the Fascist weight within the regime whereas others have embedded those perceived features of "weak party" within the frame of a particular model of "Spanish Fascism". However, new research material has been argued to underpin the "Fascist subject", both on the basis of the existence of a pervasive and fully differentiated Fascist falangist political culture, and on the importance of the Civil War for Falangism, which served as an area of experience, of violence, of memory, as well as for the generation of a culture of victory. Under the perspective of a comparative of European fascisms, Javier Rodrigo considers the Francoist regime to be paradigmatic for three reasons: for being the only authoritarian European regime with totalitarian aspirations, for being the regime that deployed the most political violence in times of rhetorical peace, and for being the regime deploying the most effective "memoricidal" apparatus. Preston points out that the characteristics used to point out the non-Fascist nature of Francoism were exhibited by Fascist Italy: the heterogenous nature of the FET JONS could be paralleled by the fusion of radical Italian Fascists with other right-wing groups after 1922, and similarly, Fascist regime, which was a 'compromise' of radical fascism and conservatism, displayed "pluralism", including the partnership of the party and the army instead of full subjugation of the latter to the first. This line emphasizing "pluralism" of the regime to define it as "authoritarian" as opposed to fascist draws back to Juan José Linz who give such assessment of the regime back in the 1960s; while many authors followed him, and such definition received some backing from the regime himself, contemporary authors note that while the abstractions Linz derived from his reading of Francoism became important for regime typology in political science, Francoism was much stronger and dynamic in ideological intensity in terms of its nationalism, 'National Catholicism' and fascism; meanwhile, Linz's claims about the "semi-opposition" and division of power within the Spanish State which he back then gave as examples of pluralism are not confirmed by archival sources. Nevertheless, contemporary authors also note that later in its evolution the regime did become "more conventionally authoritarian" despite retaining a "major fascist ingredient" and its base principles, and that, as Helen Graham writes, "macro-economic changes... hollowed out Francoism's own ideological categories (and its 'disciplinary' efficacy)," in these terms moving it further from fascism and totalitarianism, but did not eliminate its "obsession with social control, which it called 'social peace'."

=== Political repression ===
According to Preston's estimates, Franco's forces killed about 420,000 Spaniards in the theatre of war, through extrajudicial killings during the Civil War, and in state executions immediately following its end in 1939. The first decade of Franco's rule following its end saw continued repression and the killing of an undetermined number of political opponents. In 1941 the prison population of Spain was 233,000, mostly political prisoners. According to Antony Beevor, recent research in more than half of Spain's provinces indicates at least 35,000 official executions in the country after the war, suggesting that the generally accepted figure of 35,000 official executions is low. Accounting for unofficial and random killings, and those who died during the war from execution, suicide, starvation and disease in prison, the total number is possibly closer to 200,000.

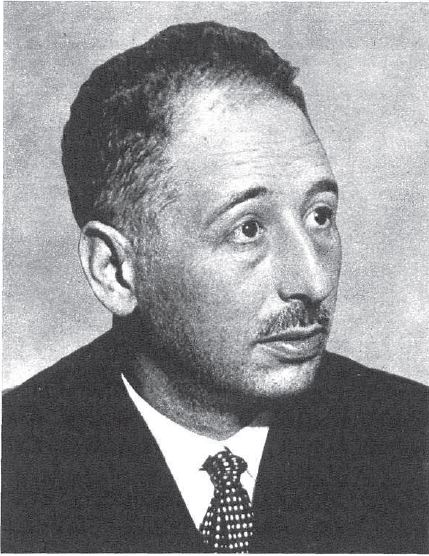
Lluís Companys, president of Catalonia under the Republic, who was executed in 1940

By the start of the 1950s Franco's state had become less violent, but during his entire rule, non-government trade unions and all political opponents across the political spectrum, from communist and anarchist organisations to liberal democrats and Catalan or Basque separatists, were either suppressed or tightly controlled with all means, up to and including violent police repression. The Confederación Nacional del Trabajo (CNT) and the Unión General de Trabajadores (UGT) trade unions were outlawed, and replaced in 1940 by the corporatist Sindicato Vertical. The Spanish Socialist Workers' Party and the Esquerra Republicana de Catalunya (ERC) were banned in 1939, while the Communist Party of Spain (PCE) went underground. The Basque Nationalist Party (PNV) went into exile, and in 1959 the ETA armed group was created to wage a low-intensity war against Franco.

Franco's Spanish nationalism promoted a unitary national identity by repressing Spain's cultural diversity. Bullfighting and flamenco were promoted as national traditions while those traditions not considered "Spanish" were suppressed. Franco's view of Spanish tradition was somewhat artificial and arbitrary: while some regional traditions were suppressed, flamenco, an Andalucian tradition, was considered part of a larger, national identity. All cultural activities were subject to censorship, and many, such as the Sardana, the national dance of Catalonia, were plainly forbidden (often in an erratic manner). This cultural policy was relaxed over time, most notably during the late 1960s and early 1970s.

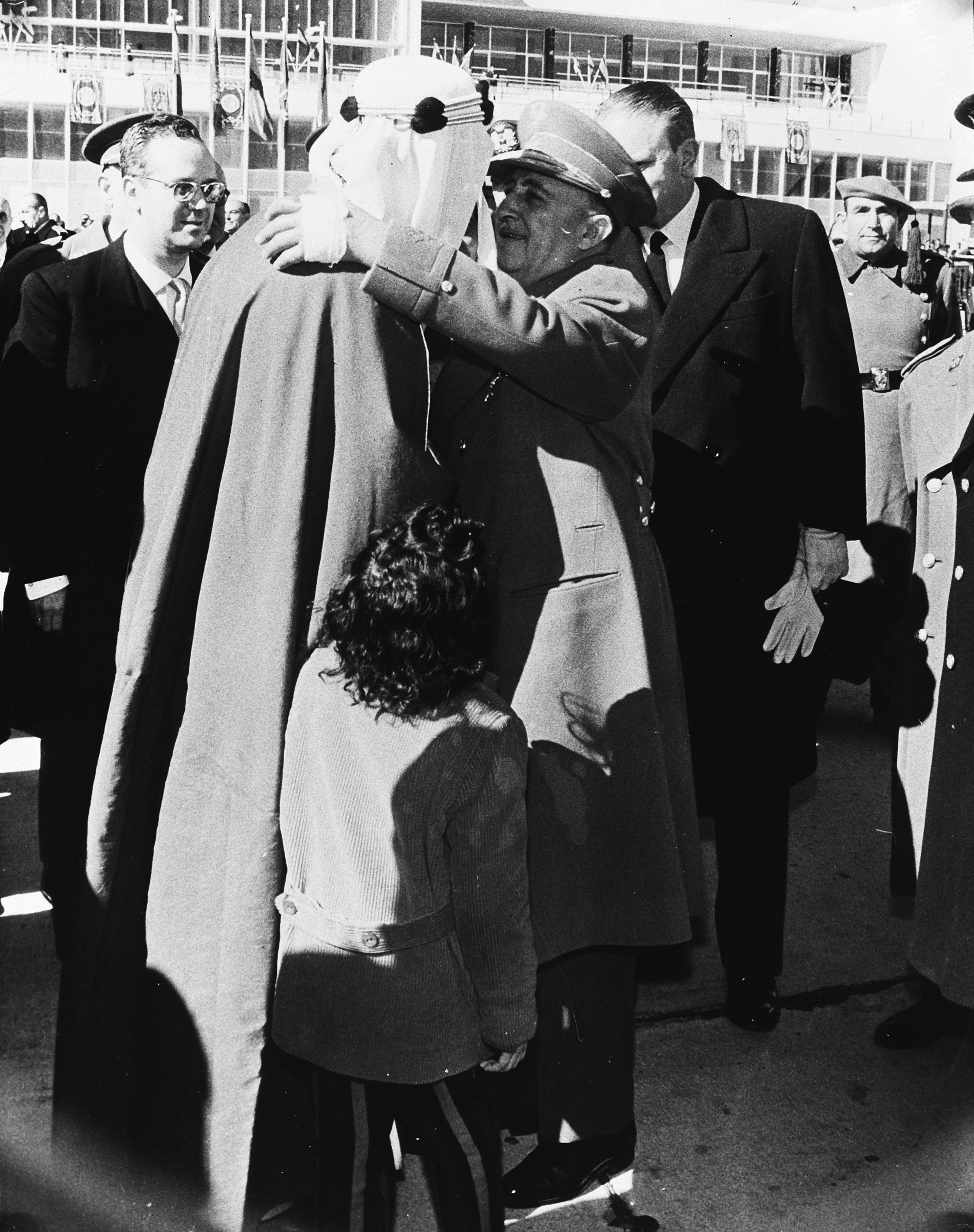
Franco with King Saud of Saudi Arabia in Madrid, 1962

Franco also used language politics in an attempt to establish national homogeneity. He promoted the use of Castilian Spanish and suppressed other languages such as Catalan, Galician, and Basque. The legal usage of languages other than Castilian was forbidden. All government, notarial, legal and commercial documents were to be drawn up exclusively in Castilian and any documents written in other languages were deemed null and void. The usage of any other language was forbidden in schools, in advertising, and on road and shop signs. For unofficial use, citizens continued to speak these languages. This was the situation throughout the 1940s and to a lesser extent during the 1950s, but after 1960 the non-Castilian Spanish languages were freely spoken and written, and they reached bookshops and stages, although they never received official status.

Most country towns and rural areas were patrolled by pairs of Guardia Civil, a military police force for civilians, which functioned as Franco's chief means of social control. Larger cities and capitals were mostly under the jurisdiction of the Policia Armada, or the grises ("greys", due to the colour of their uniforms) as they were called.

Student revolts at universities in the late 1960s and early 1970s were violently repressed by the heavily armed Policía Armada (Armed Police), and plain-clothes police were present at lectures in Spanish universities. The enforcement by public authorities of traditional Catholic values was a stated intent of the regime, mainly by using a law (the Ley de Vagos y Maleantes, Vagrancy Act) enacted by Azaña. The remaining nomads of Spain (Gitanos and Mercheros like El Lute) were especially affected. Through this law, homosexuality and prostitution were made criminal offences in 1954.

In private correspondence Chilean ruler Augusto Pinochet expressed his support for Franco's repression in 1975 when Spain received condemnation by the United Nations General Assembly for the execution of ETA and FRAP militants.

=== Spanish colonies and decolonisation ===
Spain attempted to retain control of its colonies throughout Franco's rule. During the Algerian War (1954–62), Madrid became the base of the Organisation armée secrète (OAS), a right-wing French Army group which sought to preserve French Algeria. Despite this, Franco was forced to make some concessions. When Morocco became independent from France in 1956, he surrendered the territories of the Spanish protectorate to the new-born state, retaining only a few cities (the Plazas de soberanía). The year after, Mohammed V invaded Spanish Sahara during the Ifni War (known as the "Forgotten War" in Spain). Only in 1975, with the Green March, did Morocco take control of all of the former Spanish territories in the Sahara.

In 1968, under pressure from the United Nations, Spain granted Equatorial Guinea its independence, and the following year it ceded Ifni to Morocco. Under Franco, Spain also pursued a campaign to force a negotiation on the British overseas territory of Gibraltar, and closed its border with that territory in 1969. The border would not be fully reopened until 1985.

=== Economic policy ===
The Civil War ravaged the Spanish economy. Infrastructure had been damaged, workers killed, and daily business severely hampered. For more than a decade after Franco's victory, the devastated economy recovered very slowly. Franco initially pursued a policy of autarky, cutting off almost all international trade. The policy had devastating effects, and the economy stagnated. Only black marketeers could enjoy an evident affluence.

1963 Spanish peseta coin with an image of Franco and lettering reading: "Francisco Franco, Leader of Spain, by the grace of God"

On the brink of bankruptcy, a combination of pressure from the United States and the IMF managed to convince the regime to adopt a free market economy. Many of the old guard in charge of the economy were replaced by technocrats (technocrata), despite some initial opposition from Franco. The regime took its first faltering steps toward abandoning its pretensions of self-sufficiency and towards a transformation of Spain's economic system. Pre-Civil War industrial production levels were regained in the early 1950s, though agricultural output remained below prewar levels until 1958. The years from 1951 to 1956 were marked by substantial economic progress, but the reforms of the period were only sporadically implemented, and they were not well coordinated. From the mid-1950s there was a slow but steady acceleration in economic activity, but the relative lack of growth (compared to the rest of Western Europe) eventually forced the Franco regime to allow the introduction of liberal economic policies in the late 1950s. During the pre-stabilisation years of 1957–1959, Spanish economic planners implemented partial measures such as moderate anti-inflationary adjustments and incremental moves to integrate Spain into the global economy, but external developments and a worsening domestic economic crisis forced them to adopt more sweeping changes. A reorganisation of the Council of Ministers in early 1957 had brought a group of younger men, most of whom were educated in economics and had experience, to the key ministries. The process of integrating the country into the world economy was further facilitated by the reforms of the 1959 Stabilisation and Liberalisation Plan.

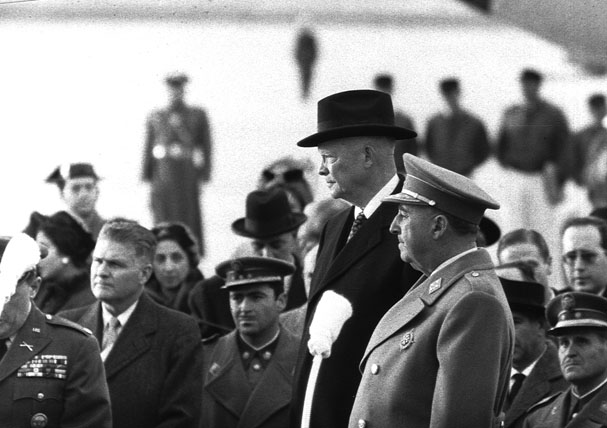
Franco with US President Dwight D. Eisenhower in Madrid, December 1959

When Franco replaced his ideological ministers with the apolitical technocrats, the regime implemented several development policies that included deep economic reforms. After a recession, growth took off from 1959, creating an economic boom that lasted until 1974, and became known as the "Spanish miracle".

Concurrent with the absence of social reforms, and the economic power shift, a tide of mass emigration commenced to other European countries, and to a lesser extent, to South America. Emigration helped the regime in two ways. The country got rid of populations it would not have been able to keep in employment, and the emigrants supplied the country with much needed monetary remittances.

During the 1960s, the wealthy classes of Francoist Spain experienced further increases in wealth, particularly those who remained politically faithful, while a burgeoning middle class became visible as the "economic miracle" progressed. International firms established factories in Spain where salaries were low, company taxes very low, strikes forbidden and workers' health or state protections almost unheard of. State-owned firms like the car manufacturer SEAT, truck builder Pegaso, and oil refiner INH, massively expanded production. Furthermore, Spain was virtually a new mass market. Spain became the second-fastest growing economy in the world between 1959 and 1973, just behind Japan. By the time of Franco's death in 1975, Spain still lagged behind most of Western Europe but the gap between its per capita GDP and that of the leading Western European countries had narrowed greatly, and the country had developed a large industrialised economy.

== Succession ==
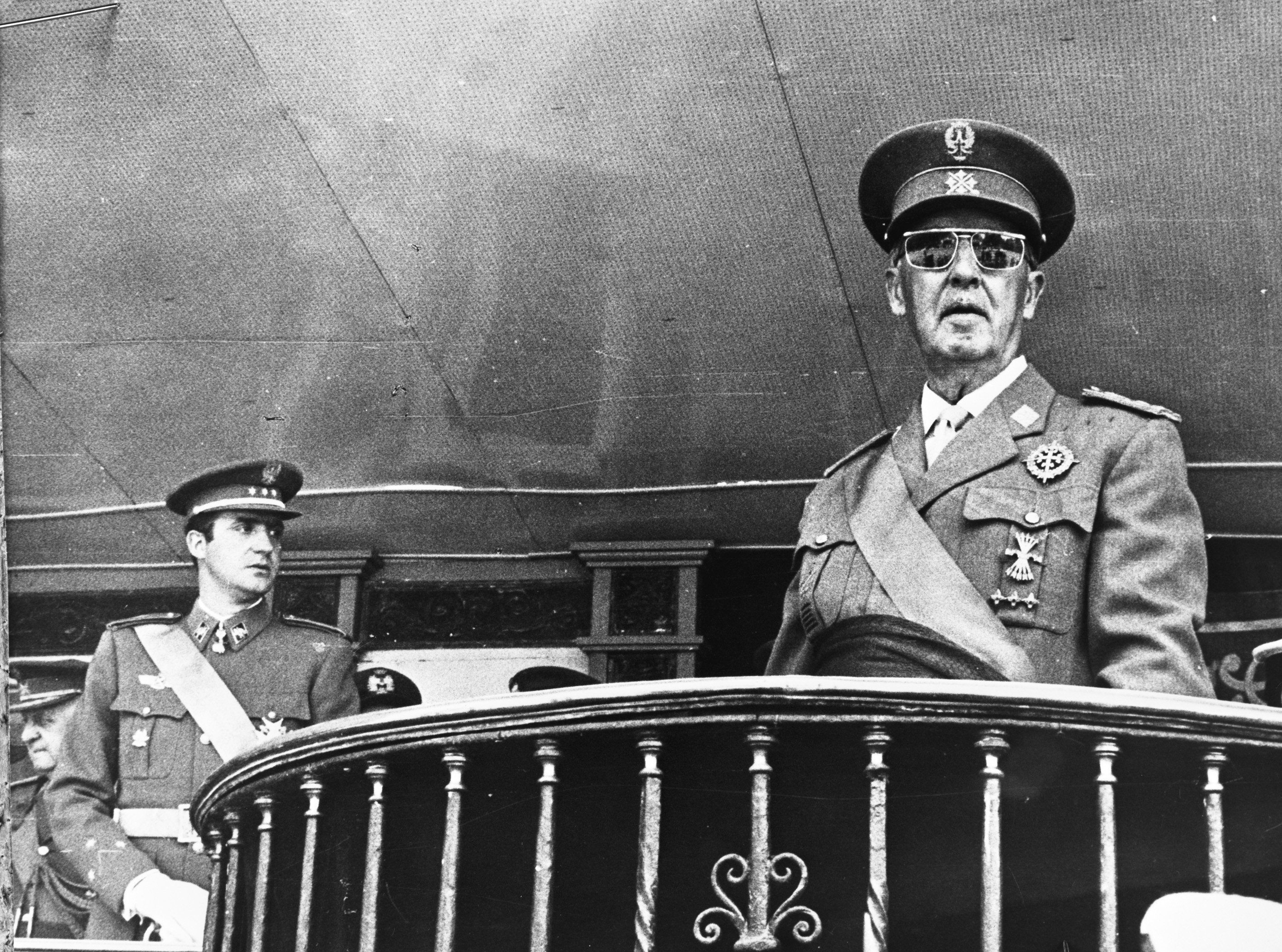
Franco with Prince Juan Carlos in 1969

In the late 1960s, the ageing Franco decided to name a monarch to succeed his regency, but the simmering tensions between the Carlists and the Alfonsoists continued. In 1969, Franco formally nominated as his heir-apparent Prince Juan Carlos de Borbón, whose family sent him to Spain at age 10 to be educated there during Franco's reign, with the new title of Prince of Spain, suggested by Laureano López Rodó to avoid a confrontation with Juan Carlos's father, Juan de Borbón, the Count of Barcelona. This designation came as a surprise to the Carlist pretender to the throne, Prince Xavier of Bourbon-Parma, as well as to Don Juan.

As his final years progressed, tensions within the various factions of the Movimiento would consume Spanish political life, as varying groups jockeyed for position in an effort to win control of the country's future.

== Death and funeral ==
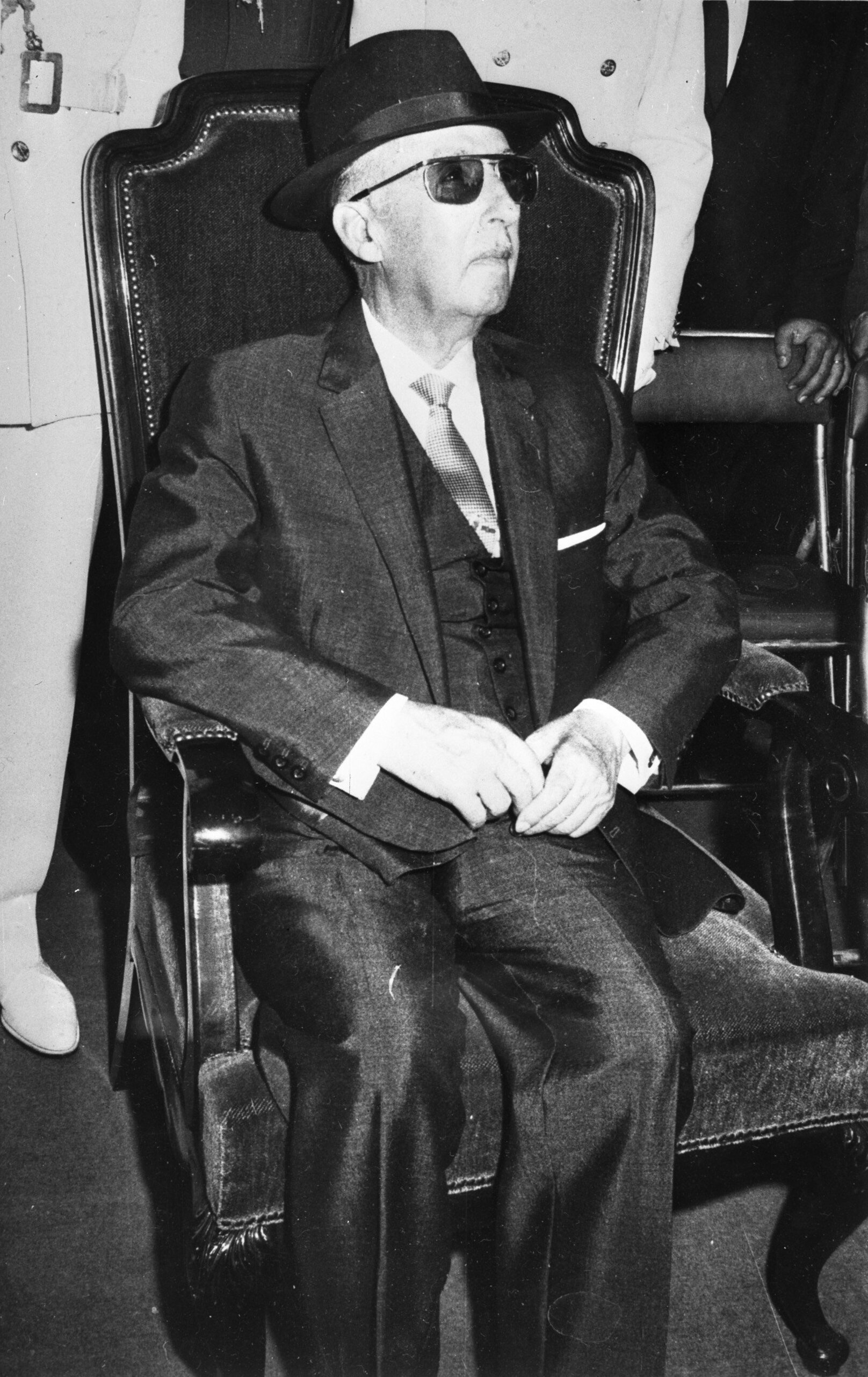
Franco in October 1975, a month before his death

After a prolonged illness in his final years, Franco died on 20 November 1975 at the age of 82, according to a statement from the government, on the 39th anniversary of the death of José Antonio Primo de Rivera, the founder of the Falange. Historian Ricardo de la Cierva said, however, that he had been told around 6 pm on 19 November that Franco had already died.

As soon as news of Franco's death was made public, the government declared thirty days of official national mourning. On 22 November, Juan Carlos was officially proclaimed King of Spain. There was a public viewing of Franco's body at the chapel in the Royal Palace; a requiem mass and a military parade were held on 23 November, the day of his burial. The mass was attended, among others, by Chilean leader Augusto Pinochet, Bolivian leader Hugo Banzer and the First Lady of the Philippines, Imelda Marcos. Major European governments, who condemned Franco's regime, declined to send high-level representatives to his funeral.

Franco's body was interred near the grave of Primo de Rivera at the Valley of the Fallen (Valle de los Caídos), a colossal memorial built using forced labour by political prisoners, ostensibly to honour the casualties of both sides of the Spanish Civil War. He was the only person interred in the Valley who did not die during the civil war. As the cortège with Franco's body arrived, some 75,000 rightists wearing the blue shirts of the Falangists greeted it with rebel songs from the civil war and fascist salutes.

Following Franco's funeral, his widow, Carmen Polo, supervised the moving of crates of jewellery, antiques, artworks, and Franco's papers to the family's various estates in Spain or to safe havens in foreign countries. The family remained extremely rich after his death. Polo had a room in her apartment in which the walls were lined from floor to ceiling with forty columns of twenty drawers, some containing tiaras, necklaces, earrings, garlands, brooches and cameos. Others contained gold, silver, diamonds, emeralds, rubies, topazes, and pearls, but the most valuable jewels were kept in bank vaults.

=== Exhumation and reburial ===
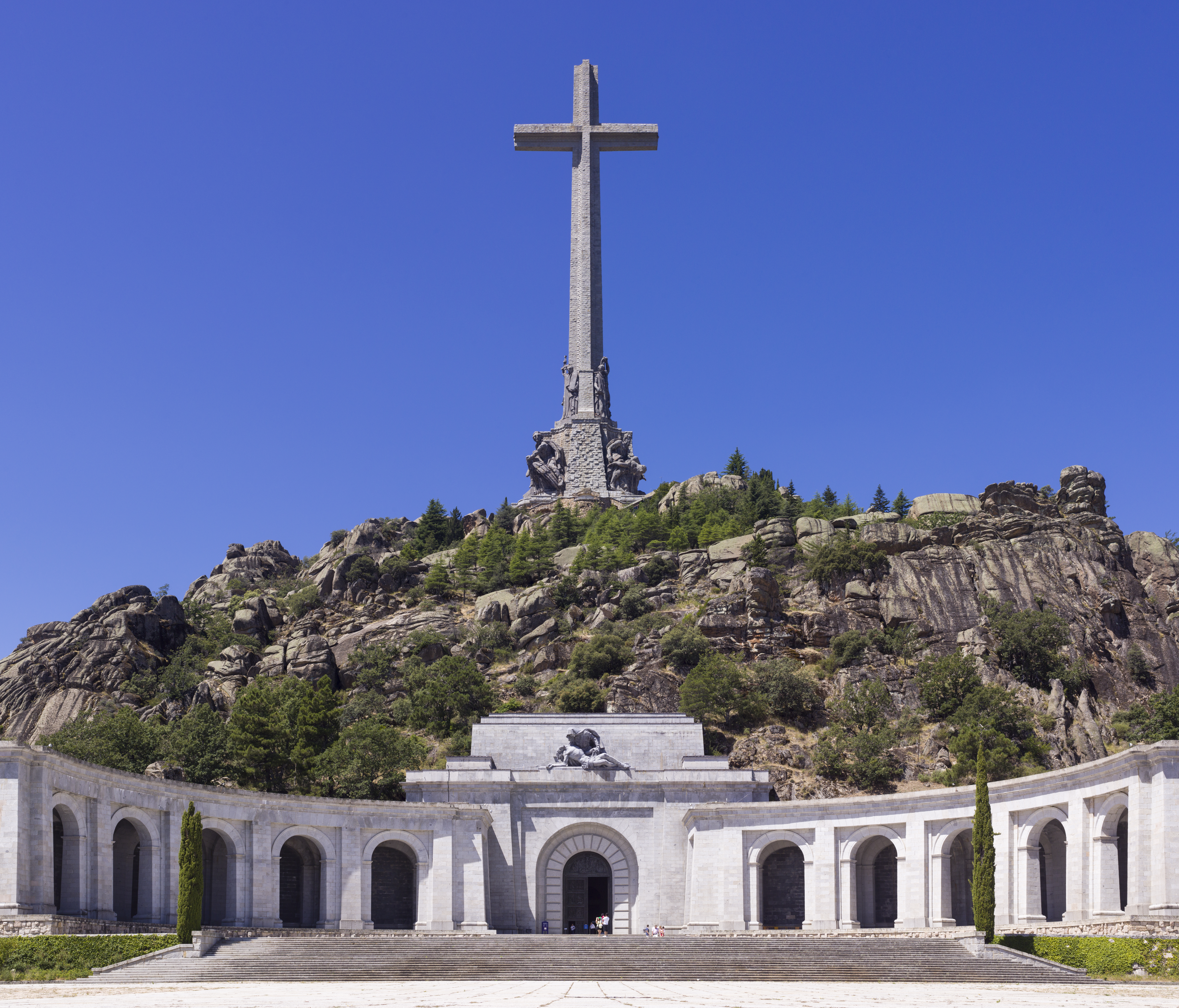
In 2019, Franco's body was removed from the monument of Santa Cruz del Valley of the Fallen, where it had lain since his funeral in 1975.

On 11 May 2017, the Congress of Deputies approved, by 198–1 with 140 abstentions, a motion driven by the Socialist Workers' Party ordering the Government to exhume Franco's remains.

On 24 August 2018, the Government of Prime Minister Pedro Sánchez approved legal amendments to the Historical Memory Law stating that only those who died during the Civil War would be buried at the Valle de los Caídos, resulting in plans to exhume Franco's remains for reburial elsewhere. Deputy Prime Minister Carmen Calvo Poyato stated that having Franco buried at the monument "shows a lack of respect ... for the victims buried there". The government gave Franco's family a 15-day deadline to decide Franco's final resting place, or else a "dignified place" would be chosen by the government.

On 13 September 2018, the Congress of Deputies voted 176–2, with 165 abstentions, to approve the government's plan to remove Franco's body from the monument.

Franco's family opposed the exhumation and attempted to prevent it by making appeals to the Ombudsman's Office. The family expressed its wish that Franco's remains be reinterred with full military honours at the Almudena Cathedral in the centre of Madrid, the burial place he had requested before his death. The demand was rejected by the Spanish Government, which issued another 15-day deadline to choose another site. Because the family refused to choose another location, the Spanish Government ultimately chose to rebury Franco at the Mingorrubio Cemetery in El Pardo, where his wife Carmen Polo and a number of Francoist officials, most notably prime ministers Luis Carrero Blanco and Carlos Arias Navarro, are buried. His body was to be exhumed from the Valle de los Caídos on 10 June 2019, but the Supreme Court of Spain ruled that the exhumation would be delayed until the family had exhausted all possible appeals.

On 24 September 2019, the Supreme Court ruled that the exhumation could proceed, and the Sánchez government announced that it would move Franco's remains to the Mingorrubio cemetery as soon as possible. On 24 October 2019 his remains were moved to his wife's mausoleum which is located in the Mingorrubio Cemetery, and buried in a private ceremony. Though barred by the Spanish government from being draped in the Spanish flag, Francisco Franco's grandson, also named Francisco Franco, draped his coffin in the Nationalist flag. According to a poll by the Spanish newspaper, El Mundo, 43% of Spanish people approved of the exhumation while 32.5% opposed it. Opinions on the exhumation were divided by party line, with the Socialist party strongly in favour of the exhumation as well as the removal of his statue there. There seems to be no consensus on whether the statue should simply be moved or completely destroyed.

== Legacy ==
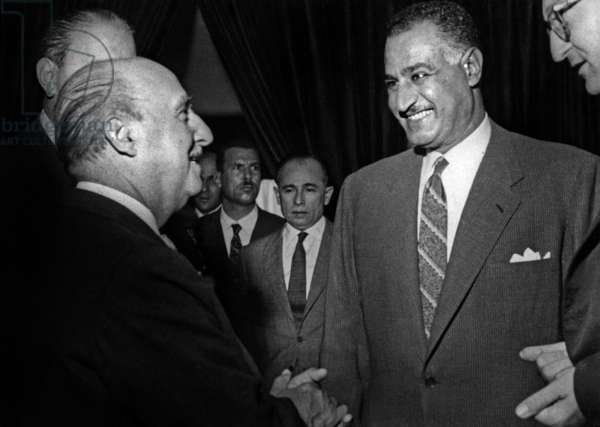
Franco greeting Egypt's President Gamal Abdel Nasser at Madrid airport, 24 September 1960

In Spain and abroad, the legacy of Franco remains controversial. The longevity of Franco's rule (39 years in the Nationalist Zone and 36 years in all of Spain), his suppression of political opposition, and his government's effective propaganda sustained through the years have made a detached evaluation difficult. For almost 40 years, Spaniards, and particularly children at school, were told that Divine Providence had sent Franco to save Spain from chaos, atheism, and poverty. Historian Stanley Payne described Franco as being the most significant figure to dominate Spain since King Felipe II, while Michael Seidman argued that Franco was the most successful counter-revolutionary leader of the 20th century.

A highly controversial figure within Spain, Franco is seen as a divisive leader. Supporters credit him for keeping Spain neutral and uninvaded during the Second World War. They emphasise his strong anti-communist and nationalist views, economic policies, and opposition to socialism as major factors in Spain's post-war economic success and later international integration. For Spain's neutrality during the war he was praised by Winston Churchill, Charles de Gaulle and Franklin D. Roosevelt. He was also supported by Konrad Adenauer and many American Catholics, but was later strongly opposed by the Harry S. Truman administration. The Palmarian church canonised Franco.

The American conservative commentator William F. Buckley, Jr was an admirer of Franco, and praised him effusively in his magazine, National Review, where the staff were also ardent admirers of the leader. In 1957, Buckley called him "an authentic national hero", who "above others", had the qualities needed to wrest Spain from "the hands of the visionaries, ideologues, Marxists and nihilists".

Conversely, critics on the left have denounced him as a tyrant responsible for thousands of deaths in years-long political repression and have called him complicit in atrocities committed by Axis forces during the Second World War due to his support of the Axis governments.

When he died in November 1975, the major parties of the left and the right in Spain agreed to follow the Pact of Forgetting. To secure the transition to democracy, they agreed not to have investigations or prosecutions dealing with the civil war or Franco. The agreement effectively lapsed after 2000, the year the Association for the Recovery of Historical Memory (Asociación para la Recuperación de la Memoria Histórica (ARMH)) was founded and the public debate started. In 2006, a poll indicated that almost two-thirds of Spaniards favoured a "fresh investigation into the war".

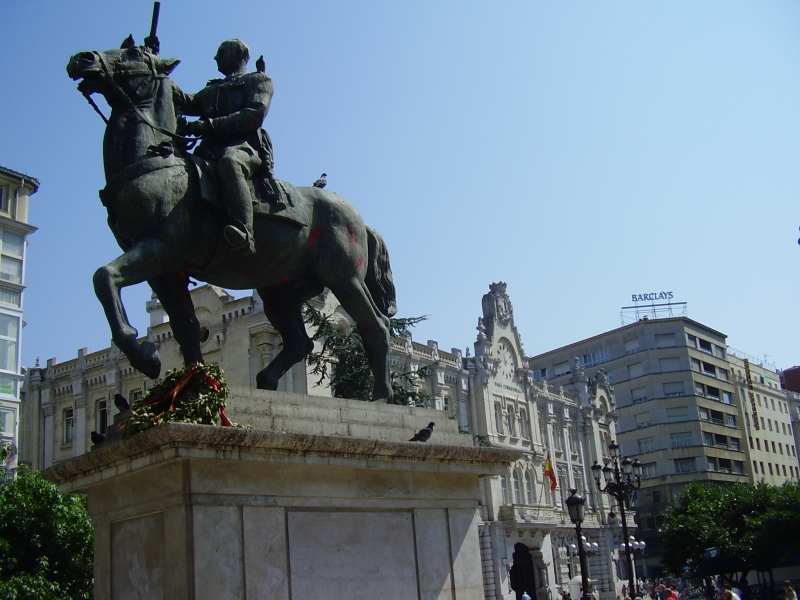
A statue of Franco in Santander was removed in 2008.

Franco served as a role model for several anti-communist leaders in South America. Augusto Pinochet is known to have admired Franco. Similarly, as recently as 2006, Franco supporters in Spain have honoured Pinochet. Even in 2024, the American book Unhumans by Jack Posobiec lauded Franco as a hero.

In 2006, the BBC reported that Maciej Giertych, an MEP of the clerical-nationalist League of Polish Families, had expressed admiration for Franco, stating that the Spanish leader "guaranteed the maintenance of traditional values in Europe".

Spaniards who suffered under Franco's rule have sought to remove memorials of his regime. Most government buildings and streets that were named after Franco during his rule have been reverted to their original names. Owing to Franco's human-rights record, the Spanish government in 2007 banned all official public references to the Franco regime and began the removal of all statues, street names and memorials associated with the regime, with the last statue reportedly being removed in 2008 in the city of Santander. Churches that retain plaques commemorating Franco and the victims of his Republican opponents may lose state aid. Since 1978, the national anthem of Spain, the Marcha Real, does not include lyrics introduced by Franco. Attempts to give the national anthem new lyrics have failed due to lack of consensus.

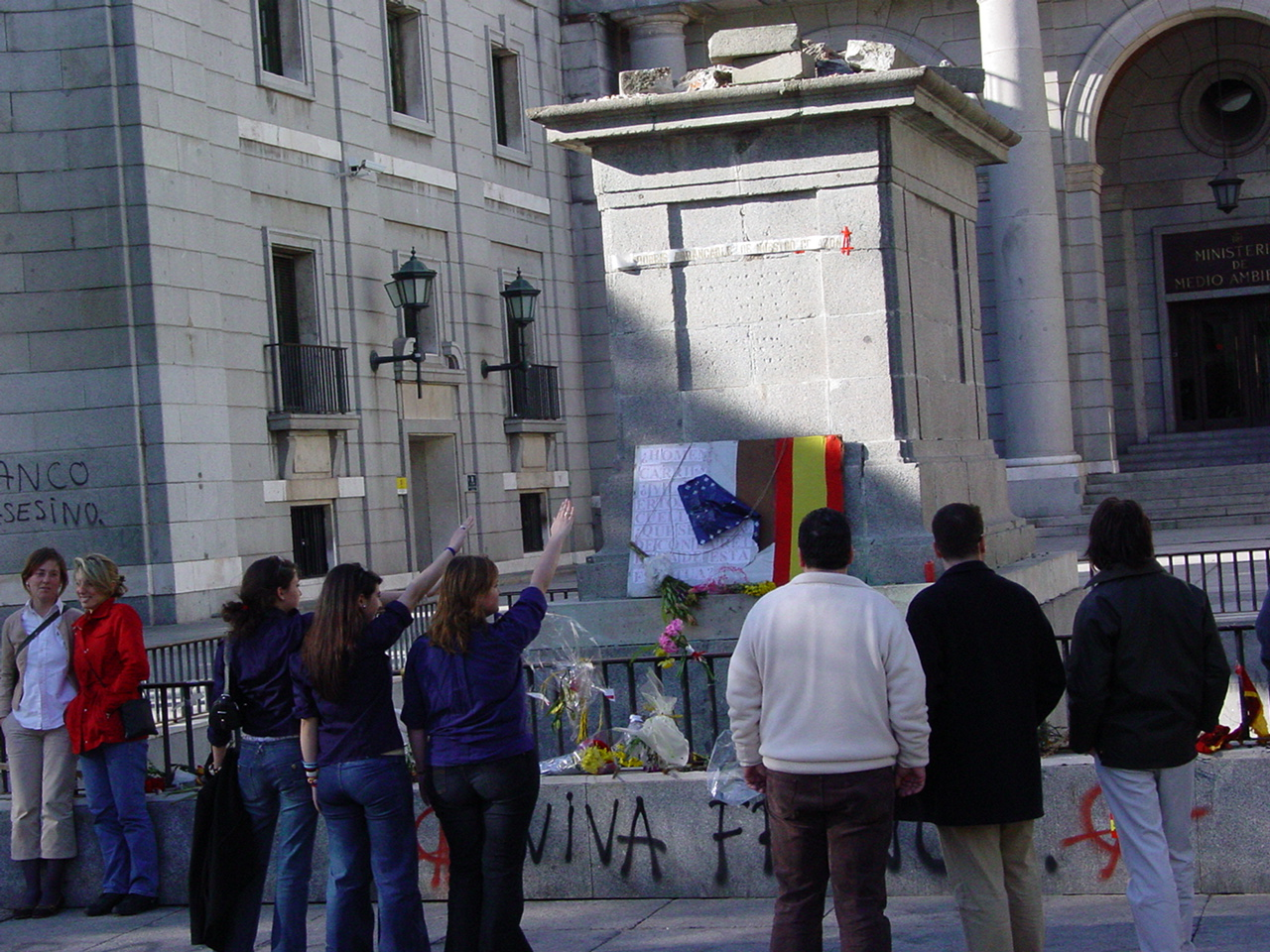
People saluting in front of the empty plinth from which the equestrian statue of Franco in Madrid had been removed

On 11 February 2004, Luis Yáñez-Barnuevo and others presented a motion for the "Need for international condemnation of the Franco regime" to the Parliamentary Assembly of the Council of Europe. In March 2006, the Permanent Commission of the Parliamentary Assembly unanimously adopted a resolution "firmly" condemning the "multiple and serious violations" of human rights committed in Spain under the Francoist regime from 1939 to 1975. The resolution was at the initiative of Leo Brincat and of the historian Luis María de Puig and was the first international official condemnation of the repression enacted by Franco's regime. The resolution also urged that historians (professional and amateur) be given access to the various archives of the Francoist regime, including those of the private Francisco Franco National Foundation (FNFF) which, along with other Francoist archives, remain inaccessible to the public as of 2006. The FNFF received various archives from El Pardo Palace and is alleged to have sold some of them to private individuals. Furthermore, the resolution urged the Spanish authorities to set up an underground exhibit in the Valle de los Caidos monument to explain the "terrible" conditions in which it was built. Finally, it proposed the construction of monuments to commemorate Franco's victims in Madrid and other important cities.

In Spain, a commission to "repair the dignity" and "restore the memory" of the "victims of Francoism" (Comisión para reparar la dignidad y restituir la memoria de las víctimas del franquismo) was approved in 2004 and is directed by the social-democratic deputy Prime Minister María Teresa Fernández de la Vega.

Recently, the Association for the Recovery of Historical Memory (ARHM) initiated a systematic search for mass graves of people executed during Franco's regime, which has been supported since the Spanish Socialist Workers' Party's (PSOE) victory during the 2004 elections by José Luis Rodríguez Zapatero's government. A Ley de la memoria histórica de España (Law on the Historical Memory of Spain) was approved on 28 July 2006, by the Council of Ministers, but it took until 31 October 2007 for the Congress of Deputies to approve an amended version as: "The Bill to recognise and extend rights and to establish measures in favour of those who suffered persecution or violence during the Civil War and the Dictatorship" (in common parlance still known as Law of Historical Memory). The Senate approved the bill on 10 December 2007.

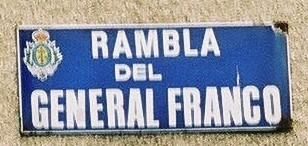
Sign in Santa Cruz de Tenerife for a street bearing Franco's name which was renamed in 2008 Rambla de Santa Cruz

Official endeavours to preserve the historical memory of Spanish life under the Franco regime include exhibitions like the one held at the Museu d'Història de Catalunya (Museum of Catalan History) in 2003–2004, titled "Les presons de Franco". This exposition depicted the experiences of prisoners in Franco's prison system and described other aspects of the penal system such as women's prisons, trials, the jailers, and prisoners' families. The Museum no longer maintains its online version of the exhibition.

The accumulated wealth of Franco's family (including much real estate inherited from Franco, such as the Pazo de Meirás, the Canto del Pico in Torrelodones and the Casa Cornide in A Coruña) and its provenance have also become matters of public discussion. Estimates of the family's wealth have ranged from 350 million to 600 million euros. While Franco was dying, the Francoist Cortes voted a large public pension for his wife Carmen Polo, which the later democratic governments kept paying. At the time of her death in 1988, Carmen Polo was receiving a pension of over 12.5 million pesetas (four million more than the salary of Felipe González, then head of the government).

== In popular media ==
=== Cinema and television ===
- Raza or Espíritu de una Raza (Spirit of a Race) (1941), based on a script by Jaime de Andrade (Franco himself), is the semi-autobiographical story of a military officer played by Alfredo Mayo.
- Franco, ese hombre (That man, Franco) (1964) is a pro-Franco documentary film directed by José Luis Sáenz de Heredia
- The movie Dragon Rapide (1986) deals with the events previous to the Spanish Civil War, with the actor Juan Diego playing Franco
- Argentine actor José "Pepe" Soriano played both Franco and his double in Espérame en el cielo (Wait for Me in Heaven) (1988).
- Ramon Fontserè played him in ¡Buen Viaje, Excelencia! (Bon Voyage, Your Excellency!) (2003).
- Manuel Alexandre played Franco in the TV movie 20-N: Los ultimos dias de Franco (20-N: The Last Days of Franco) (2008)
- Juan Viadas played Franco in Álex de la Iglesia's movie Balada triste de trompeta (The Last Circus) (2010)
- The first-season episode Cómo se reescribe el tiempo of the Spanish television series El Ministerio del Tiempo (2015) sets events around Franco's October 1940 meeting with Adolf Hitler at Hendaye. Franco is portrayed by actor Pep Mirás.
- At the end of the movie La reina de España (The Queen of Spain), Franco, played by Carlos Areces, is spat on in the face by the fictional Macarena Granada (Penélope Cruz), a Spanish Hollywood star who has returned to Spain to film a movie during Franco's reign.

=== Music ===
- French singer-songwriter and anarchist Léo Ferré wrote "Franco la muerte", a song he recorded for his 1964 album Ferré 64. In this highly confrontational song, he directly shouts at the Franco and lavishes him with contempt. Ferré refused to sing in Spain until Franco was dead.

=== Literature ===
- Franco is a character in CJ Sansom's book Winter in Madrid
- ...Y al tercer año resucitó (...And On the Third Year He Rose Again) (1980) describes what would happen if Franco rose from the dead.
- Franco is featured in the novel Triage (1998) by Scott Anderson.
- Franco is the centrepiece of the satirical work El general Franquisimo o La muerte civil de un militar moribundo (The Great General Franco, or the Civil Death of a Dying Soldier) by Andalucian political cartoonist and journalist Andrés Vázquez de Sola.
- Franco features in several novels by Caroline Angus Baker, including Vengeance in the Valencian Water, visiting the aftermath of the 1957 Valencia floods, and Death in the Valencian Dust, about the final executions handed down before his death in 1975.

== Honours and arms ==
Arms and guidon
Personal arms (1940–1975)	Guidon as Head of State

== See also ==
- General Secretariat of the Head of State
- "Generalissimo Francisco Franco is still dead"
- Language politics in Francoist Spain
- Symbols of Francoism

== Notes ==
Political offices
Preceded by Manuel Azaña as President of Spain	Head of the Spanish State; 1 October 1936 – 20 November 1975	Succeeded by Alejandro Rodríguez de Valcárcel as President of the Regency Council
Preceded by Juan Negrín	Prime Minister of Spain; 30 January 1938 – 8 June 1973	Succeeded by Luis Carrero Blanco
