= Ricardo de la Puente =

Spanish military personnel (1895–1936)

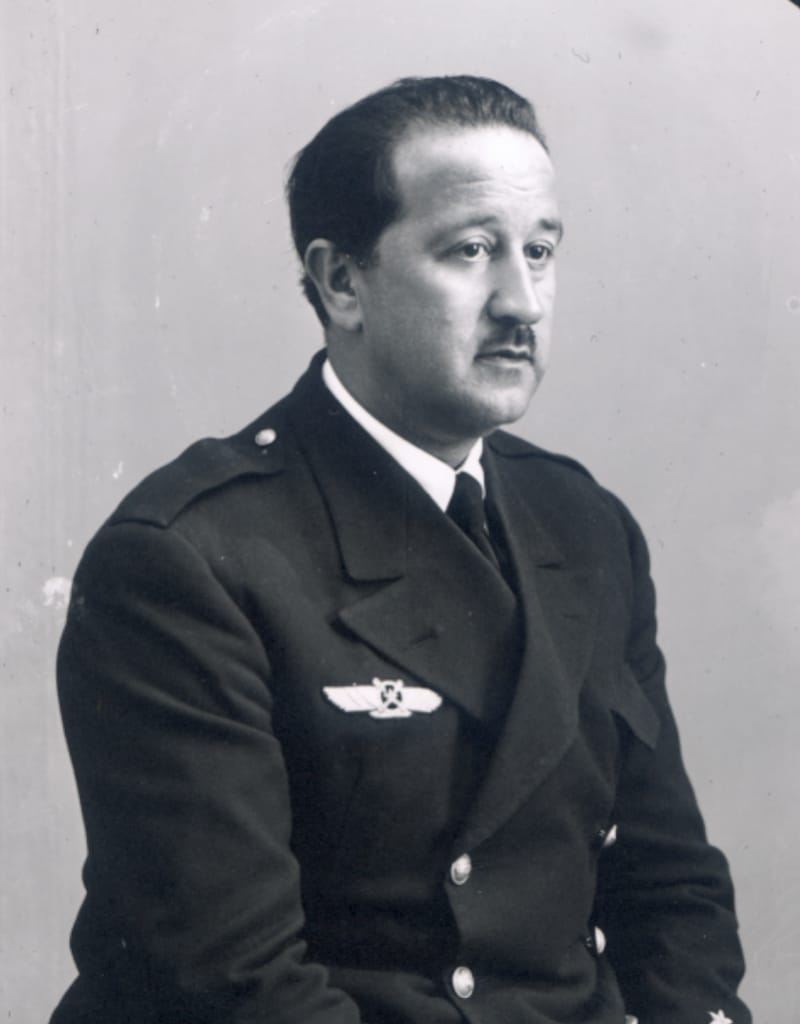
- Puente In 1935
- Born: Ricardo de la Puente Bahamonde; 5 June 1895; Ferrol, Kingdom of Spain
- Died: 4 October 1936 (aged 41); Ceuta, Spain

Ricardo de la Puente Bahamonde (Ferrol, June 5, 1895 – Ceuta, August 4, 1936) was an aviator and military Spanish, first cousin of the dictator Francisco Franco. He was Franco's maternal first cousin. He participated in the Rif War with distinction, earning him two medals. During the Asturias Revolution of 1934, he refused to bomb Asturian miners, which led to his dismissal by his cousin Francisco, then Chief of Staff. The Melilla military uprising on July 17, 1936 found him as commander of the Tetouan-Sania Ramel airfield, in the Protectorate of Morocco. De la Puente called the High Commissioner of Morocco, Arturo Álvarez-Buylla Godino, to inform him that he and his squadron would remain loyal to the Republic. But it was all in vain. Moroccan colonial forces under Colonel Eduardo Sáenz de Buruaga soon surrounded the airbase, and by dawn on 18 July, the government loyalists' resistance had ended. De la Puente surrendered, but not before ordering his men to disable the Breguet XIXs deployed at the base.

When his cousin Francisco arrived at the Tetouan airfield to assume command of the rebel army, the rebel officers informed him of what had happened. Franco consented to his execution, although he delegated to General Luis Orgaz Yoldi the task of signing the death warrant. Tried by military court for the crime of treason, he was shot on August 4, 1936, at Monte Hacho (Ceuta).
