= Picayune Creek =

Stream in Johnson County, Iowa, U.S.

Coordinates: 41.557240°N 91.578778°W

Picayune Creek is a stream in Johnson County, Iowa, in the United States. It is a tributary to Dirty Face Creek.

Picayune was so named because a pioneer who settled on the creek charged one picayune for salting a calf.

== See also ==
- List of rivers of Iowa
