= Currency of Spain =

This is a list of currency of Spain. The official currency of Spain since 2002 is the Euro. The basic and most prevalent unit of Spanish currency before the Euro was the Peseta. The first Peseta coins were minted in 1869, and the last were minted in 2011. Peseta banknotes were first printed in 1874 and were phased out with the introduction of the Euro. Prior to this was the Silver escudo (1865–1869), Gold escudo (1535/1537–1849), Spanish real (mid-14th century–1865), Maravedí (11th–14th century), and Spanish dinero (10th century).

== List ==
Image	Currency	Date established	Date abolished	Initial exchange rate
	Euro	2002	—	1 euro = 166.386 pesetas
	Peseta	1869	2002	1 peseta = 0.4 escudos
	Silver escudo	1865	1869	1 silver escudo = 0.1 reales
	Gold escudo	1535/1537	1849	1 gold escudo = 16 reales
	Spanish real	Mid-14th century	1865	1 real = 3 maravedíes
	Maravedí	11th century	14th century	
	Spanish dinero	10th century	10th century	

== See also ==
- Currency of Spanish America
- Céntimo
- Other coins

- Dobla
- Doubloon
- Columnarios
- Picayune
- Spanish dollar
- Spanish euro coins
