= Picayune =

Spanish coin type

Silver half-real (picayune) of Philip V, dated 1742.

A picayune was a Spanish coin, worth half a real or one sixteenth of a dollar. Its name derives from the French picaillon, which is itself from the Provençal picaioun, the name of an unrelated small copper coin from Savoy. By extension, picayune can mean "trivial" or "of little value".

Aside from being used in Spanish territories, the picayune and other Spanish currency was used throughout the colonial United States. Spanish dollars were made legal tender in the U.S. by an act on February 9, 1793. They remained so until demonetization on February 21, 1857 as a result of the Coinage Act of 1857. The coin's name first appeared in Florida and Louisiana, where its value was nominally one sixteenth of a dollar, i.e. 6 1/4 cents, and whose name was sometimes used in place of the U.S. nickel.

A newspaper published in New Orleans since the 1830s, the Times-Picayune (originally The Picayune), was named after the coin.

A city in southern Mississippi has the name Picayune.
