= General Secretariat of the Head of State =

Political-administrative body of early Francoist Spain (1936–1938)

- Secretaría General del Jefe del Estado

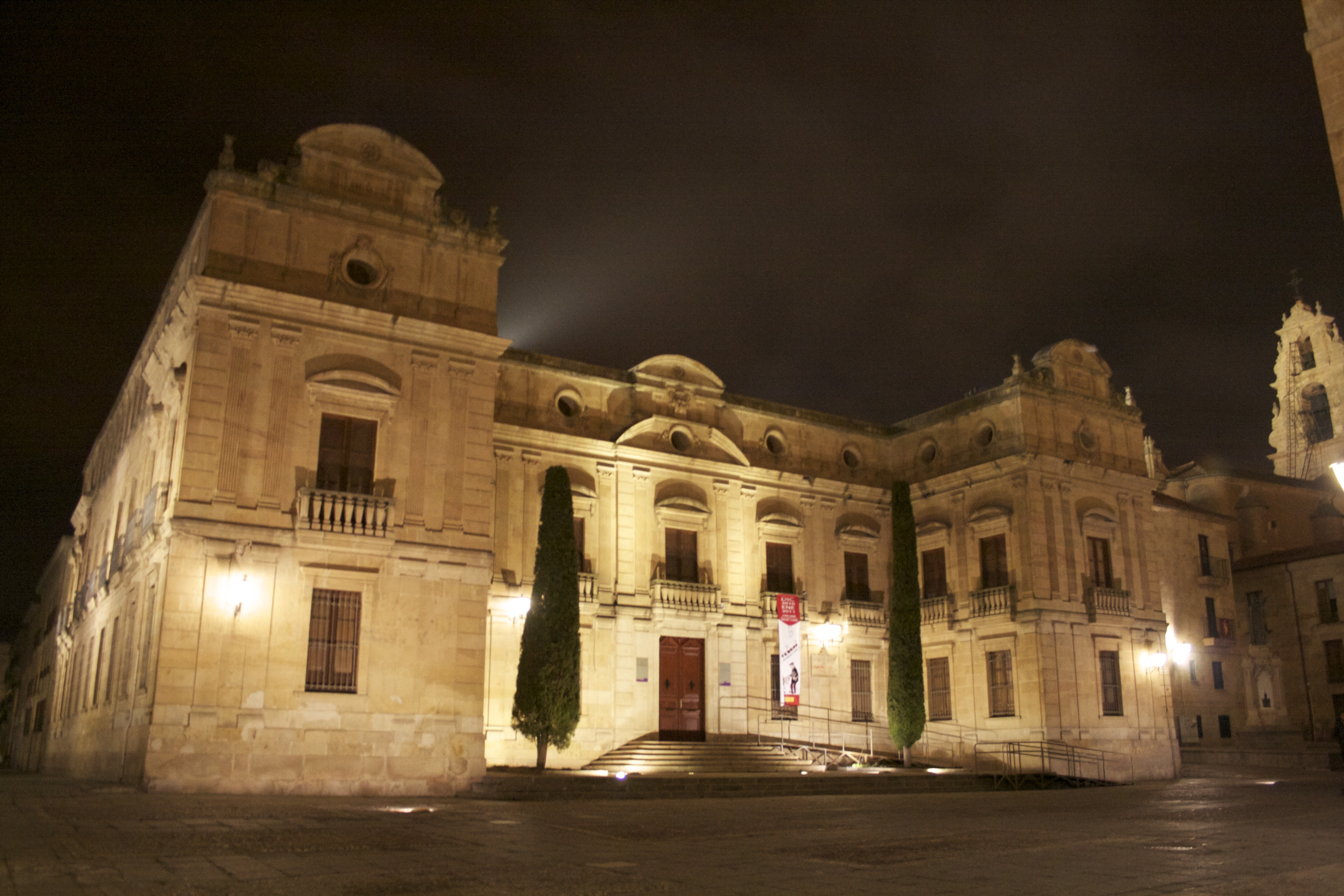
- Episcopal Palace of Salamanca, first headquarters of the Secretariat

Agency overview
- Formed: October 2, 1936
- Preceding agency: National Defense Junta
- Dissolved: January 30, 1938
- Superseding agency: First government of Francisco Franco
- Jurisdiction: Rebel zone
- Headquarters: Salamanca
- Agency executive: Nicolás Franco (politician), General Secretary
- Parent agency: Head of State

The General Secretariat of the Head of State (Spanish: Secretaría General del Jefe del Estado) was one of the various political-administrative bodies created by General Francisco Franco on 2 October 1936 following his appointment as Head of Government. It was one of the main institutions that shaped the initial governmental organization established by Franco, characterized by its provisional nature and dispersion. Its existence spanned the Spanish Civil War, and it was throughout directed by the Generalísimo's brother, Nicolás Franco, who thus wielded considerable power until Ramón Serrano Suñer gradually displaced him as the Caudillo's chief collaborator. The Secretariat disappeared with the formation of Franco's first government on 30 January 1938.

== Context ==
On 30 September 1936, amid the Spanish Civil War, the Boletín Oficial de la Junta de Defensa Nacional de España published Franco's appointment as Generalísimo of the armies and as Head of Government. The dual appointment implied the establishment of a dictatorship in the expanding territory controlled by the rebels. On 1 October, Francisco Franco officially took office, and although he had only been named Head of Government of the State, all official media from the outset referred to him as "Head of State". His power was unlimited, but he knew that the generals who had elected him viewed the mandate as provisional until a swift military victory, expected with the capture of Madrid. At that time, various sectors believed the new Generalísimo should focus exclusively on military matters, leaving political issues to them. Since his authority was not yet consolidated, Franco trusted only a small circle of people, prominently including his brother Nicolás.

Franco was in no hurry to form a proper government and contented himself with creating a more technical than political body, relying on his brother Nicolás. On 2 October, the renamed Boletín Oficial del Estado published the law establishing a Technical State Junta (Junta Técnica del Estado), a General Government, a Secretariat of Foreign Relations, and a General Secretariat of the Head of State. The provisional nature of the new organization was evident in the addition: "without taking as definitive the one currently established, although it be a harbinger of the permanent one to be set up once the entire national territory is under control".

== The Junta ==
The Technical State Junta consisted of a presidency and seven commissions. Its headquarters were in Burgos, a city that had previously hosted the National Defense Junta. Although its commission structure resembled an embryonic Council of Ministers, it comprised second-tier figures handling routine administrative functions.

It was headed by a president—General Dávila—responsible not only for directing the institution but also for serving as a communication channel with the Head of State. The latter held the final decision on all matters. According to the Junta's operating rules, published on 6 October 1936, the president was to meet at least weekly with the commission presidents. He would communicate with Francisco Franco through direct dispatches, though he could delegate this function to others.

== Nicolás Franco ==
Nicolás Franco was the eldest of the Franco brothers. He was extroverted, fond of pleasures, generous with money, and a womanizer. He was always his father's favorite. Unlike Francisco, he gained entry into the Spanish Navy to continue the family tradition and studied at the Naval Engineering School. During the Second Spanish Republic, he pursued a political career within the Agrarian Party, serving as director general of the Merchant Navy in 1935. According to Portela Valladares, he even became the party's secretary general, which held republican and conservative ideology.

At the outbreak of the war, he placed himself at his brother's service. He coordinated efforts among supportive bankers to secure economic resources and acted as the rebels' representative to the Portuguese government. He then joined the "campaign team" that secured Francisco's appointments first as Generalísimo and then as Head of Government. At that moment, he was one of the few people the new ruler trusted.

== Franco's headquarters in Salamanca ==
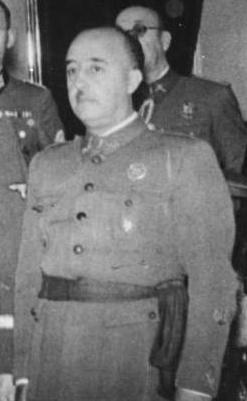
Francisco Franco in 1940. The General Secretariat was at his service, and the general acted as Head of State.

General Francisco Franco established his headquarters in Salamanca, which became the center of Nationalist power. Bishop Plá y Deniel lent him the episcopal palace for this purpose. Nicolás Franco served as political secretary on the ground floor, alongside other collaborators. He had two undersecretaries: José Carrión and Manuel Saco. Initially, the two Franco brothers attempted to create a "Francoist" political party from conservative sectors, but growing opposition from the increasingly numerous Falange deterred them.

Although there was a Secretariat of Foreign Relations headed by diplomat Francisco Serrat y Bonastre, it was José Antonio Sangróniz who acted as shadow foreign minister alongside Nicolás Franco. It was also established on the ground floor, though later moved to San Sebastián. However, despite Franco's ability to use various collaborators for negotiations, he always reserved the predominant role in diplomacy for himself.

The Press and Propaganda department was also set up on the palace's ground floor, first directed by Juan Pujol Martínez, then by Millán Astray, and finally by Vicente Gay y Forner.

== Operation ==
The General Secretariat was configured as a kind of parallel body to the commissions of the Technical State Junta, as it required specialized personnel in each of their areas, implying clear duplication of functions. Since Francisco Franco was the supreme authority on all issues, all bodies had to send the Secretariat the background on matters requiring the Caudillo's approval to "facilitate the Head of State's dispatch and knowledge". It was a key body for exercising power, as all legal norms of any rank had to be approved by the Head of State and thus pass through his Secretariat. In reality, although Dávila presided over the Junta, real power lay with the general secretary, to the extent that the Secretariat has been described as an "omnipotent ministry" and its holder as a true prime minister. The system strikingly resembles the political organization of the former absolute monarchy, as the dictator's most important and immediate collaborators were genuine secretaries rather than ministers. However, it has been noted that Franco may have replicated the military general headquarters he knew rather than imitating Ferdinand VII.

Like most other leaders of the new political bodies, Nicolás Franco was a career military officer, holding the rank of lieutenant colonel in the Naval Engineer Corps of the Spanish Navy. Thanks to his position and family ties to the Generalísimo, he accumulated great power. Though he had proven an excellent conspirator, Nicolás was not an effective chancellor. His playboy lifestyle tormented his collaborators. He rose at 13:00 and received visitors until 15:00, then dined until 19:00. His peak activity came after midnight. These habits, and the long waits for those meeting him, frustrated many. Moreover, he made no effort to build state infrastructure. He also proceeded cautiously to avoid alarming the generals who had elevated his brother.

Nicolás Franco was aware of the precariousness of the existing political-administrative organization but did nothing to remedy it for two reasons. First, he lacked the knowledge and energy to build a state. Second, his primary concern was preserving his brother's power, based solely on the appointment by a small group of generals. He saw no rush to create anything limiting the Head of State's mandate, believing time and military victory would consolidate the government. Initially, victory seemed imminent with Madrid's capture, but as it receded, Nicolás's administrative chaos became evident.

== Serrano and the unification ==
=== Serrano Suñer ===
On 20 February 1937, Ramón Serrano Suñer arrived in Salamanca. He was a brilliant jurist, leader, and parliamentarian of the CEDA; he was also married to Carmen Polo's sister, wife of Francisco Franco. The dictator housed his brother-in-law and family in an attic-like space in the episcopal palace. Serrano's arrival drew attention from those near power. Nicolás Franco fined the Valladolid newspaper El Norte de Castilla for publishing that his arrival might lead to "a new political orientation".

Franco's wife disliked Nicolás for his dissolute life and eccentric work habits but admired her other brother-in-law Ramón for his culture and parliamentary experience. Serrano's political weight from his family ties was bolstered by his intellect. He labeled the precarious administration a "campamental state". According to Serrano, provincialism and dispersion characterized the system. Unlike the efficient military apparatus, the civil one lacked direction and goals. Serrano became key in transforming this weak framework into the New State's base, providing political orientation and content. The general secretary's power remained undisputed until March or April 1937, but Serrano's superior intelligence, decisiveness, and charm gradually diminished his influence. The "cuñadísimo"'s sharp speech and action contrasted with the general's brother's amiability. Gradually, he displaced Nicolás Franco as the Head of State's main political advisor, though without holding any office.

Francisco Franco unified Falange Española de las JONS and the Traditionalist Communion into a Single Party

=== Creation of the single party ===
Francisco Franco recognized the need for a unitary political party. Though his brother Nicolás's efforts failed, the Head of State persisted. Serrano's arrival propelled and coherentized the project. On 11 April 1937, Franco officially tasked him with forming a new single party under his authority. They exploited internal Falange conflicts to impose by decree on 19 April its merger with the Traditionalist Communion. Other parties were dissolved, with members able to apply individually. Franco was named national chief of the new FET y de las JONS.

On 2 December, the 48 members of FET's National Council appointed by Franco took office. Though supposedly legislative, it remained advisory. The party saw little development in this period, lacked distinct ideology, served as Serrano Suñer's instrument, and was an army appendage. Notably, Nicolás Franco was not among the council members.

== Some diplomatic actions ==
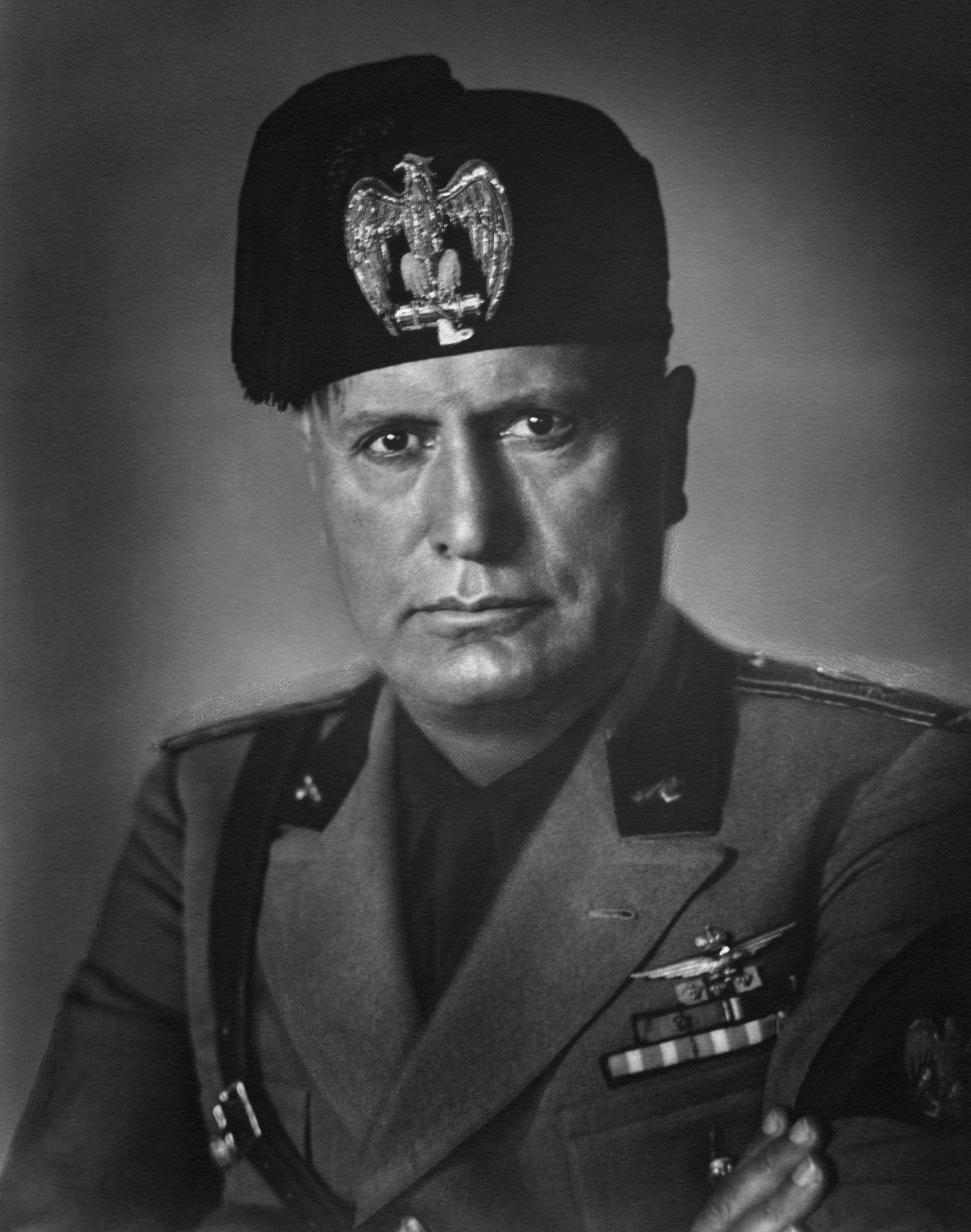
Nicolás Franco's meeting with Benito Mussolini led the latter to order his submarines to torpedo ships carrying supplies to the Republican side.

In early August 1937, Nicolás Franco traveled to Fascist Italy to meet Benito Mussolini. Though Italians had sold various warships to the rebels, they were insufficient to halt Soviet supply ships to the government side. The General Secretary's mission was to secure more combat vessels. Italians viewed the debt as substantial and unwilling to increase it, so the Duce ordered his submarines to attack Republican supply ships in the phantom submarine crisis. Though unclear how many attacks were directly Italian, several undoubtedly were.

Nicolás Franco also intervened in relations with Nazi Germany when German demands for 73 mining concessions via the Montana consortium were hindered by an October decree-law. Germans sought parity with Spaniards under the law. Francoist authorities refused, citing the Mining Law allowing only minority foreign capital and requiring Spanish directors. They recommended waiting for the new government. Suspecting the decree targeted Germany, Ambassador Eberhard von Stohrer spoke with Nicolás Franco, who said the Montana project raised suspicions and even his brother dared not violate the law. Germans wanted all northern iron production directed to them.

Von Stohrer met Sangróniz and Nicolás Franco on 15 and 16 December 1937, demanding the 73 concessions where HISMA had purchase options. Both refused blanket authorization. On 20 December, the Third Reich's ambassador met General Franco himself, who in a heated conversation repeated his brother's refusal. Around 25 January 1938, the ambassador met Jordana, then president of the Technical Junta. He again rejected blanket approval but promised individual case review.

== Change in the Junta Técnica presidency ==
Following the plane crash killing General Mola on 3 June 1937, Francisco Franco named his replacement for the Army of the North as Dávila. To replace him at the Junta, he appointed General Francisco Gómez-Jordana.

Jordana seemed reluctant and quickly recognized the difficulties, noting in his diary he was "truly disheartened by the impossibility of sorting this mess". Moreover, General Franco himself was not focused on political matters. Jordana viewed the Junta's operation as highly defective; it lacked press control; foreign affairs were with Sangróniz; and Nicolás Franco was "genial and extraordinary, but disorganized" and acted without coordination with the Junta. Consequently, in early October 1937 he advised the dictator to either deeply renew the Junta or form a proper government. This aligned with Serrano Suñer's view, by then Franco's main political advisor. Though slow to act, from October Franco announced an impending proper executive.

== Creation of the first government ==
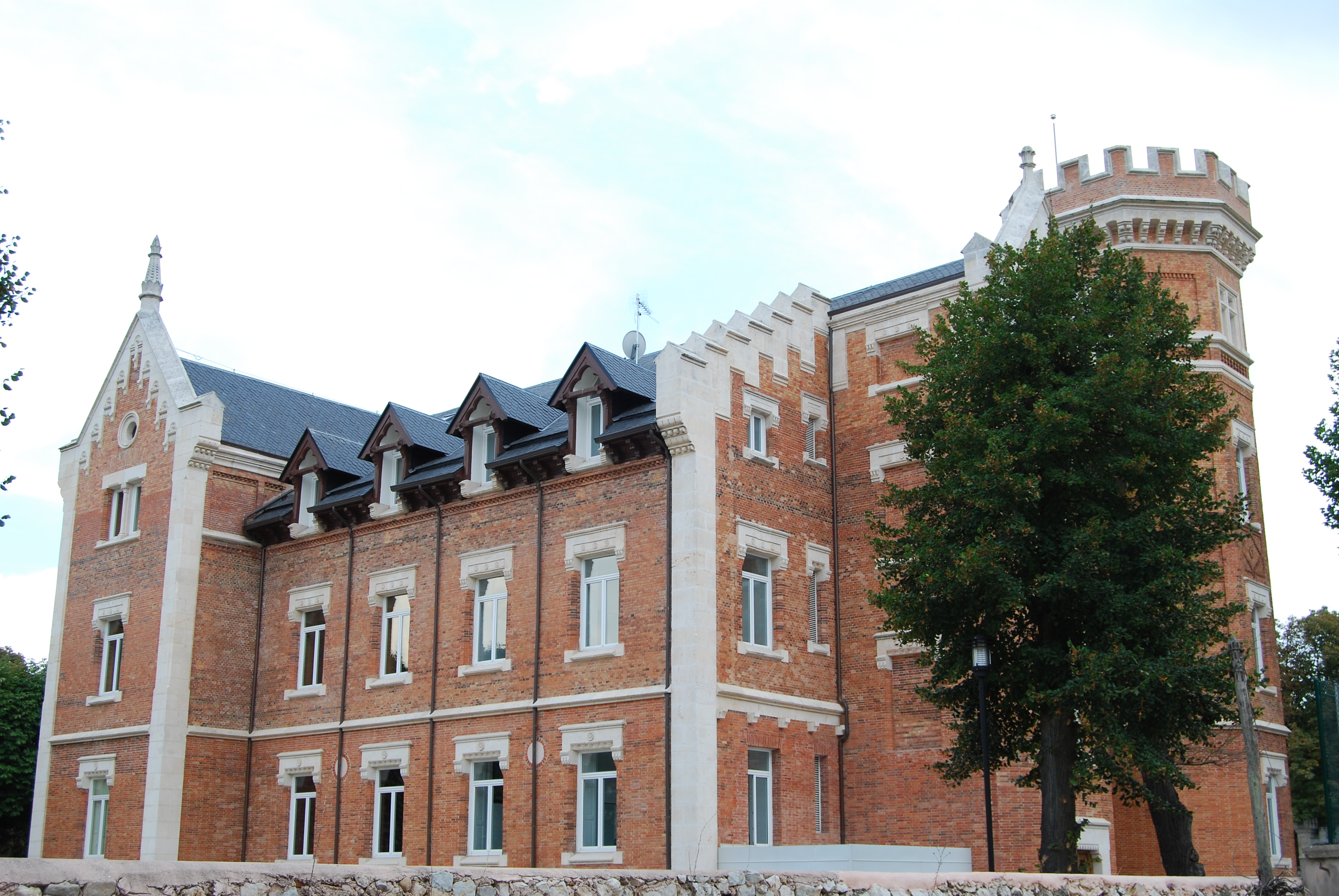
The palace of the counts of Muguiro housed the Secretariat during its stay in Burgos.

After conquering the North, Francisco Franco moved his headquarters to Burgos, installing in the more spacious residence of the counts of Muguiro compared to Salamanca's episcopal palace. There, Serrano Suñer continued institutionalizing the regime and drafted the Law on Central Administration of the State, the government's true "institutional charter" approved on 30 January 1938. This led to an executive with eleven ministerial portfolios replacing the dispersed and ineffective prior administration. This government's composition was Franco's first political exercise, balancing tendencies without dominance. The Technical Junta president, Jordana, became Foreign Minister and government vice president. Serrano finally gained office as Interior Minister.

Franco wanted his brother Nicolás as Industry and Commerce Minister, but Serrano said it would be "too much family". On Franco's insistence, the "cuñadísimo" offered to exclude himself, prompting the general to relent. Thus, the new government marked Serrano's definitive triumph over Nicolás Franco, who was sidelined. The same befell Sangróniz, perceived by Germans and Italians as pro-British in his de facto foreign affairs role, relegated to ambassador to Venezuela.

== See also ==
- Junta Técnica del Estado

== Bibliography ==
- Casanova, Julián (2007). Historia de España. 8. República y guerra civil. Barcelona: Crítica / Marcial Pons. pp. 339–357. ISBN 978-84-8432-878-0.
- Crozier, Brian (1969). Franco, historia y biografía. I. Madrid: Magisterio Español S.A. pp. 179–384. ISBN 84-265-7048-8.
- García Lahiguera, Fernando (1983). Ramón Serrano Súñer. Un documento para la Historia. Barcelona: Argos Vergara. pp. 88–124. ISBN 84-7178-679-6.
- Gil Cuadrado, Luis Teófilo (2006). El Partido Agrario Español (1934–1936): Una alternativa conservadora y republicana (PDF). Madrid: Complutense University of Madrid. pp. 460–595. ISBN 978-84-669-2932-5.
- Jackson, Gabriel (2010). La República española y la guerra civil. Barcelona: Crítica. pp. 269–443. ISBN 978-84-08-05500-6.
- Payne, Stanley G. (1987). El régimen de Franco. Madrid: Alianza Editorial. pp. 179–317. ISBN 84-206-9553-X.
- Preston, Paul (1994). Franco, «Caudillo de España». Barcelona: Grijalbo. pp. 20–370. ISBN 84-253-2498-X.
- Ranzato, Gabriele (2006). El eclipse de la democracia. Madrid: Siglo XXI. pp. 502–525. ISBN 978-84-323-1248-9.
- Suárez, Luis (1999). Franco, crónica de un tiempo. I. El general de la Monarquía, la República y la Guerra Civil. Madrid: Actas. pp. 383–593. ISBN 84-87863-78-7.
- Thomas, Hugh (1976). La Guerra Civil Española. Barcelona: Grijalbo Mondadori. pp. 550–697. ISBN 84-253-2767-9.
- Tusell, Javier (1997). "La Junta Técnica del Estado". La Guerra Civil Española: El avance rebelde. Barcelona: Ediciones Folio S.A. pp. 70–82. ISBN 84-413-0437-8.
