= State Technical Junta =

Francoist governmental organization (1936–1938)

- Junta Técnica del Estado
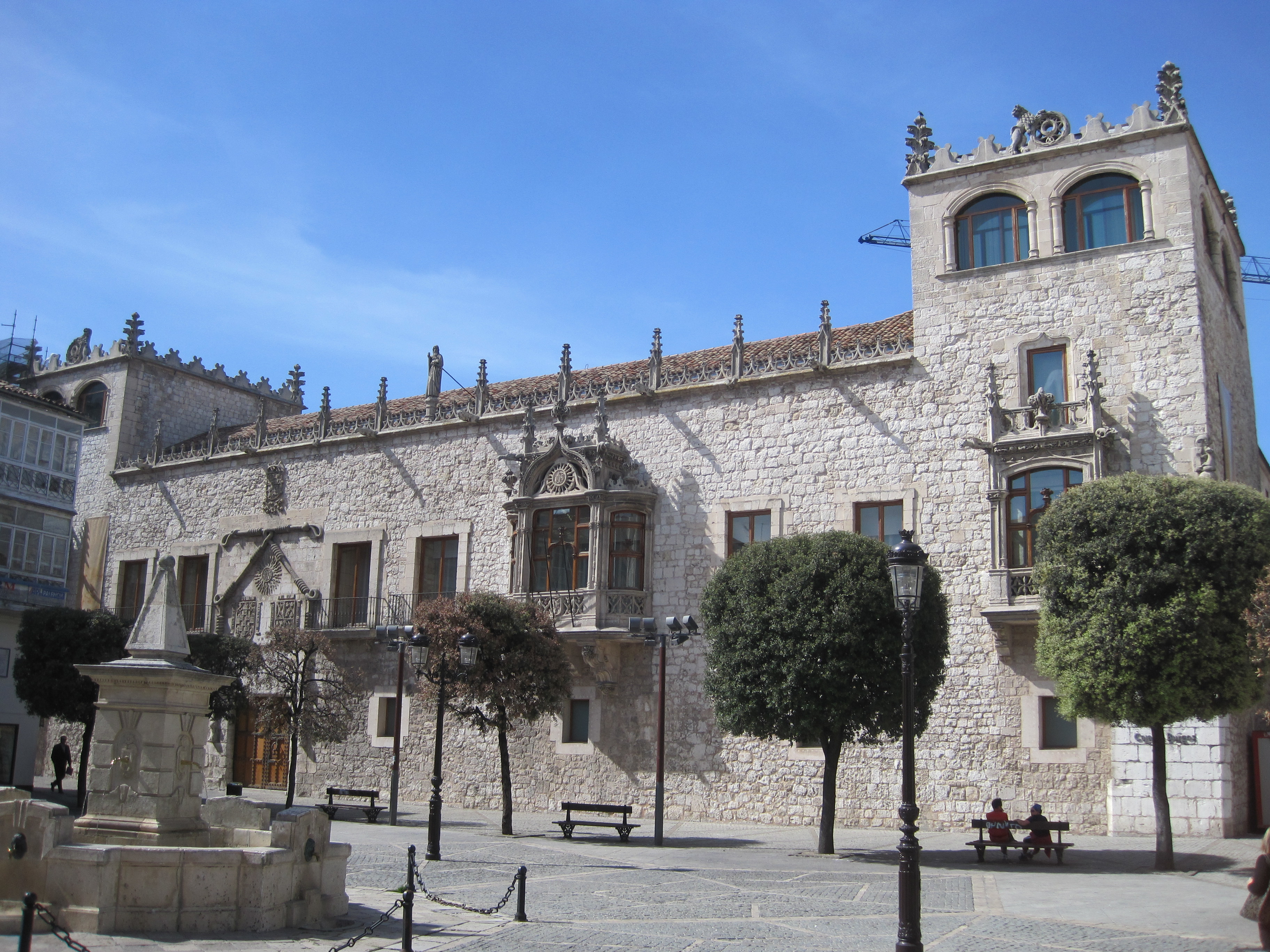
- The Casa del Cordón in Burgos, headquarters of the Junta.

Agency overview
- Formed: October 2, 1936
- Preceding agency: National Defense Junta
- Dissolved: January 30, 1938
- Superseding agency: First government of Francisco Franco
- Jurisdiction: Nationalist faction (Spanish Civil War)
- Headquarters: Casa del Cordón (Burgos)
- Agency executives: Fidel Dávila Arrondo; Francisco Gómez-Jordana Sousa

The State Technical Junta (Spanish: Junta Técnica del Estado) was one of several political-administrative bodies created by General Francisco Franco in October 1936 after his appointment as head of government of rebel Spain during the Spanish Civil War. It was one of the main institutions that made up the first governmental organization created by Franco. Although it was divided into sectorial commissions, it was not a real government and was composed of personalities with little political relevance. It was successively presided over by Generals Fidel Dávila Arrondo and Francisco Gómez-Jordana Sousa. It disappeared with the creation of Franco's first proper government in February 1938.

== Context ==
After the death of the leader of the military uprising in a plane crash, General José Sanjurjo, General Emilio Mola and General Miguel Cabanellas created a National Defense Junta on July 25, 1936, headed by the latter, which would be in charge of both directing military operations and politically leading the rebel movement. Major General Miguel Cabanellas Ferrer was appointed president because he was the most senior major general among the military rebels.

The Junta assumed for a period of time and in a collegiate manner "all the powers of the State" in the territory controlled by the coup plotters, and self-styled as the national zone.

However, movements soon arose in favor of centralizing the command.

== The Generalissimo ==
As a result, on September 30, 1936, Decree 138 was published in the Official Bulletin of the Spanish National Defense Junta, naming General Franco generalissimo of the armies and head of the State government.

On October 1 Franco officially took office. Although he had only been named head of government, all the official media spoke from the beginning of "head of state", thus increasing his power. His main priority was to achieve military victory and he was in no hurry to form a real government. He was therefore content to create a more technical than political body —the Junta Técnica del Estado— and to rely on his brother Nicolas, whom he appointed general secretary to the head of state.

On October 2, the law creating this and other agencies was published in the renamed Boletín Oficial del Estado. The preamble of the law reveals its nature:

The structuring of the new Spanish State, within the nationalist principles, calls for the establishment of those administrative bodies which, dispensing with unnecessary bureaucratic development, respond to the characteristics of authority, unity, speed and austerity.

The temporality of the new organization was evident from the addition:

without taking as definitive the one currently in place, even if it is an announcement of the permanent one to be established once the entire national territory has been dominated.

Both the terminology and the provisional nature of the institution are typical of military language, which seeks the creation of a kind of rearguard quartermaster to solve the most immediate problems, but subordinated to the fundamental objective of obtaining military victory. The new Junta was not a real government. It was probably considered that it would be an instrument of civilian support for the military until the end of the war, which was then foreseen to be near.

== Structure ==
The Junta was organized as follows:

Charge	Name	Beginning	End
President	Fidel Dávila Arrondo; Francisco Gómez-Jordana Sousa	October 2, 1936; June 3, 1937	June 3, 1937; January 30, 1938
Justice Commission	José Cortés López	October 2, 1936	January 30, 1938
Finance Commission	Andrés Amado y Reygondaud de Villebardet	October 2, 1936	January 30, 1938
Industry, Commerce and Supply Commission	Joaquín Bau Nolla	October 2, 1936	January 30, 1938
Agriculture and Farm Labor Commission	Eufemio Olmedo Ortega	October 2, 1936	January 30, 1938
Work Commission	Alejandro Gallo Artacho	October 2, 1936	January 30, 1938
Culture and Education Commission	José María Pemán y Pemartín	October 2, 1936	January 30, 1938
Public Works and Communications Commission	Mauro Serret y Mirete	October 2, 1936	January 30, 1938

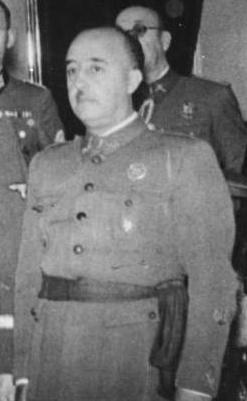
Franco was the supreme authority and all proposals had to be submitted to his Secretaría General.

The structure of the Junta was reminiscent of Primo de Rivera's Military Directory, with the creation of seven commissions in place of the ministries and similar to the latter's committees. It was also reminiscent of the Dictatorship in the desire for these bodies to be non-political and "arbitrista". The main headquarters of the Junta was in Burgos. Although its composition in commissions was reminiscent of an incipient cabinet, it was made up of second-rate personalities who were mainly in charge of routine administrative functions.

Since Franco was the supreme instance for all matters, all the agencies had to send to the Secretaría General del Jefe del Estado the background of the matters that had to be approved by the Caudillo to "facilitate the dispatch and knowledge of the Head of State". Thus, the Secretariat was a key body for the exercise of power through which all legal norms had to pass and, although Dávila presided over the Junta, the real power was in the hands of Nicolás Franco.

Consequently, three months after the coup d'état, rebel Spain showed the appearance of being a new State in which all parties collaborated in a process of centralization, unity and efficiency, as opposed to the division and waste of resources present on the Republican side. The following year 1937 would be a difficult one in military terms, but one of great consolidation of the political power of the neophyte dictator.

== Presidency ==
The Junta was headed by a president in charge not only of directing the institution, but also of serving as a channel of communication with the head of state. The latter was the ultimate decision-maker in all matters. According to the operating rules of the Junta, published on October 6, he was to confer at least once a week with the presidents of the commissions. The president of the Junta would communicate with the Caudillo through direct dispatches, although he could also delegate this function to others.

The president was at all times a military man, a decision that marked a clear tendency of Franco to rely politically on his subordinates. The initial choice was Fidel Dávila, a brigadier general who, at the same time, was appointed chief of the General Staff. He was the only member of the dismissed National Defense Junta who continued to hold a position in the new administration. Dávila has the image of a bureaucrat among some historians, but the truth is that he had fought in the wars of Cuba and Morocco, where he had demonstrated his ability. (Note: In fact, Javier Tusell considers that if General Fernandez Silvestre had paid more attention to Dávila's advice, the Annual disaster could have been avoided. Tusell (1997, p. 81)) He had a certain monarchical significance but he was, above all, a professional military man. Even smaller in stature than Franco, he was, according to Admiral Cervera, "pure, austere and Spanish" and maintained a monarchist Catholicism similar to that of Mola.

== Commissions ==
- Finance Commission

It was mainly composed of members of the military, although it was chaired by Andrés Amado, an Alfonsist monarchist whose experience gave the body a somewhat more political character. He was a financial expert who had collaborated with Calvo Sotelo during the dictatorship. According to the writings left by Franco, Amado opposed the maintenance of the exchange rate of the peseta. However, the caudillo insisted on the need to keep its value high. Although his doctrine was heterodox from the economic point of view, Franco's decision was politically opportune, as it contributed to keep prices stable during the whole period. Amado's technical competence helped the economic situation to improve in the second half of 1937.

- Justice Commission

It was presided over by the then president of the Audiencia Provincial of Las Palmas, José Cortés, and had an exclusively technical composition. Its headquarters was in Burgos. Its main task was to review the legislation then in force in order to eliminate that which was deemed incompatible with the "New State". It was also to facilitate a transition from the absolute empire of the military jurisdiction to an ordinary one.

- Industry, Commerce and Supply Commission

Its presidency was entrusted to Joaquín Bau, a traditionalist monarchist who had also been a collaborator of Calvo Sotelo when the latter had headed the Ministry of Finance during the dictatorship of Primo de Rivera. One of the functions of the commission was to contribute to the provisioning of the Army. Bau was the Catalan who held the highest political office in this period. In economic matters he had liberal ideas and was opposed to state interventionism. As in the case of Amado, his expertise contributed to the improvement of the economic situation in the second half of 1937. He played an important role in the promulgation of the Decree of October 9, 1937, which abolished the mining concessions made earlier and imposed a maximum of 25% foreign capital in the owning companies. This regulation was seen by the Germans as a challenge to their interests.

- Agriculture and Farm Labor Commission

According to the Act creating the Junta, its function was:

to establish the indispensable norms for the continuation of agricultural activities and to prepare the revaluation of land products, the establishment of family estates, agricultural cooperatives and the improvement of peasant life.

It was composed exclusively of agricultural engineers, which also gave it an eminently technical profile. Its president was Eufemio Olmedo. In the fall of 1936 it established a ban on slaughtering animals outside municipal slaughterhouses.

- Work Commission

The Act stated that it was:

responsible for all matters related to the current bases and labor agreements and the study of new guidelines for the welfare of the workers and their collaboration with the other elements of production.

Its headquarters were in Burgos.

- Public Works and Communications Commission

According to the Act:

its mission shall be to ensure the continuation of public works in progress, to undertake new projects where indispensable, to re-establish transportation lines of all kinds, to organize a perfect postal and telegraphic communications service throughout the occupied region, as well as the necessary personnel for these services.

Chaired by Mauro Serret, it was composed of civil servant engineers, so it did not have a political profile either.

- Culture and Education Commission

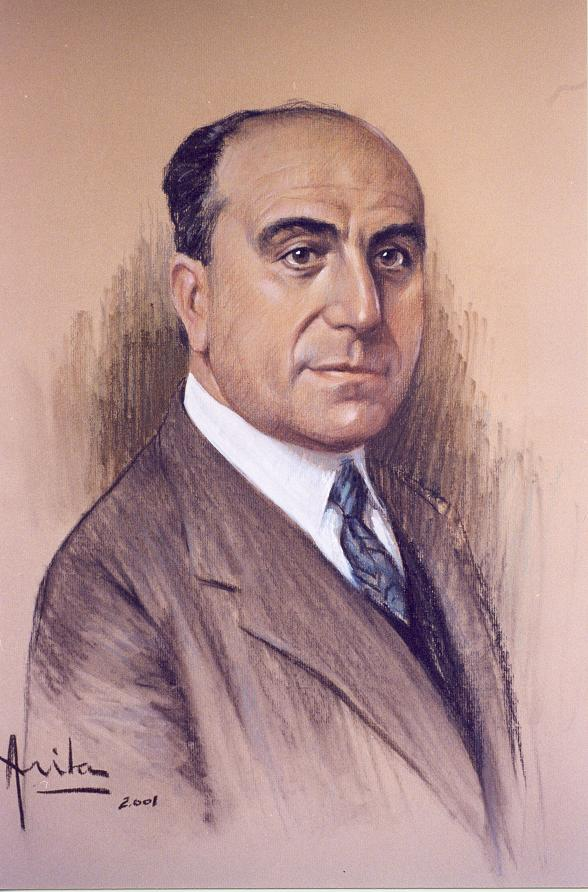
Enrique Suñer, vice-president and strong man of the Committee on Culture and Education.

It was, undoubtedly, the one with the most purely political composition. It was presided over by José María Pemán, but his lack of interest in bureaucratic work meant that the weight of management was carried by the vice-president Enrique Suñer. Eugenio Montes, Vegas Latapié, Mariano Puigdollers and Alfonso García Valdecasas were members. There was a predominance of former collaborators of Acción Española, and their relations with the Falangists were not good.

Strong censorship was implemented, pornography was persecuted and public book burnings were carried out. But the most outstanding activity of the commission was the purge of the teaching staff. In order to carry it out, political ideas and behavior were evaluated, but also religious ideas, the professional methodology used and the teachers' own private lives. To do so, they relied on reports from parish priests, mayors, the Civil Guard, solvent parents, military organizations and, after the Unification, from the Falange Española Tradicionalista y de las JONS. The commission made the final decision, without the possibility of appeal.

- Others

On November 19, 1936, a regulation of the Junta was published in the Boletín Oficial del Estado, which created a secretariat for the president and a major officer's bureau.

== Characteristics ==
The predominance of military men in the main positions was very marked. Dávila and later Jordana were career military officers. In contrast, the members of the commissions were mostly civilians. This was very much reminiscent of Primo de Rivera's Military Directory. However provisional it was, the regime instituted was essentially military. It was not only Generalissimo Franco who was head of state and the pinnacle of power; the president of the Junta Técnica, the Secretary of War, the governor general and the secretary general of the head of state were also military. Hence this attempt to dispense with the ideological component, as well as the barracks-like tone of the regulatory provisions issued. It is significant that one of the first norms of the Junta consisted in the reestablishment of the courts of honor within the Army, which had been suppressed by Azaña's military reform. (Note: The possibility of extending the courts of honor to all public administrations was even discussed, although such a rule was never approved. Tusell (1997, p. 78)) The early implementation of measures aimed at purging dissidents can also be considered of military origin. A decree-law of December 9, 1936 regulated the purge of the civil service. This predominantly military character would be pointed out years later by Ramón Serrano Súñer with these words:

Throughout the war, the civilian command was auxiliary and subordinate to the military command; at least until the constitution of the first Government (...). Most of the services were militarized (...) Also the different sections of the so-called Junta Técnica —latent ministries constituted in Burgos— were under military control; as were military most of the civil governors, provincial delegates of public order and supplies, managers of companies related to war production and even certain mayoralties.

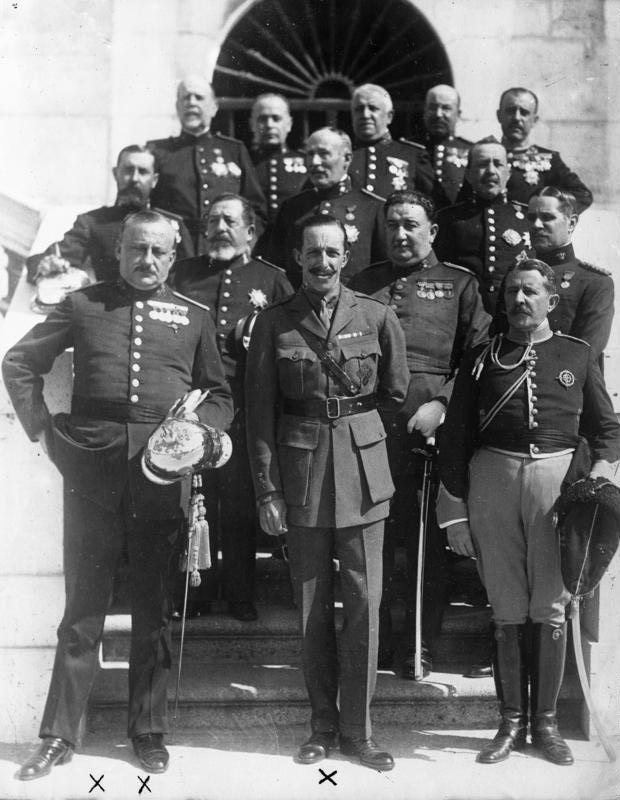
Jordana's presidency further accentuated the similarity with the Military Directory of which he had been a member.

No member of the Falange Española de las JONS held any position in the Junta, while there was a very significant percentage of monarchists, both Alfonsists and traditionalists. Therefore, the Junta Técnica was not at any time a body that helped to create a fascist or parafascist state, but an institution of Catholic or traditional significance. This continued to be so even after the unification, to the point where Pemán commented to the president of the Junta —who by then was already Jordana— that the Culture and Education Commission that he presided over became "refuge and headquarters of all that remains outside the single party".

Although the military rebels had initially avoided attacking republicanism, the revolutionary outbreak in the republican zone provoked a growing political radicalization in the rebel ranks. Already in the autumn of 1936, a cultural counter-revolution unparalleled in 20th century Europe was taking place. There was a public return to religion and a demand for the restoration of traditional values. This moral restoration fostered a spirit of discipline, unity and sacrifice that was very useful for the war. However, the "restorationist" policy was applied in a much more moderate way than it would later be. There are few examples of this attitude of restoration of religious and moral values in the first months of the Junta. On December 23, 1936, the production, trade and dissemination of pornographic material was prohibited, but also of "socialist, communist, libertarian and, in general, dissolving literature". Texts of this type were to be kept in official libraries to be consulted only in exceptional cases.

The personnel of the Junta did not receive remuneration other than the positions they had previously held. The provisional nature of the body was evident at all times and derived from the widespread belief that the seizure of Madrid was imminent. This was noticeable in some specific cases. In spite of the autonomy with which it acted, Queipo de Llano asked in mid-December 1936 if he should return his goods to the Compañía de Jesús, as had been requested by traditionalist sectors in Granada. However, the Junta never reached a decision on the matter. At other times one can perceive in his decisions a barracks-like and arbitrary tone reminiscent of the Dictatorship. A decree-law of early 1937 sought to solve the problem of unemployment, ordering the civil governors to prevent a single Spaniard from being in such a situation or "not receiving in some way relief proportional to his family needs". The determination of those in charge of the Junta to solve pressing problems made them uncomfortable with certain formalities imposed by pre-existing legislative precepts, such as the existence of contentious-administrative appeals or the obligation to request a report from the Council of State. The characteristics of the Junta Técnica reveal that Franco took the dictatorship of Primo de Rivera as a reference point at that time.

All legal norms —Statutes, decree-laws, decrees, orders and even circulars— had to be approved by Franco. The proposals could come from the Junta, but also from the secretariats or from the governor general, which soon produced a backlog. Of the 160 norms approved during 1936, some ninety came from the three secretariats. This reveals the limitations that the Junta's commissions had despite their paraministerial pretensions. In fact, the system of government more closely resembled that of the Ancien Régime with its office secretaries. The few surviving records of the meetings of the presidents of the Junta show that they dealt with matters of little political interest. They did not address reforms of importance, but limited themselves to trying to respond to pressing needs. There is only one intervention by Enrique Suñer on March 27, 1937, in which he expressed his wish that the educational reforms he was studying would be addressed soon. However, Franco was much more concerned with the direction and course of the war than with matters of government.

== Economy ==
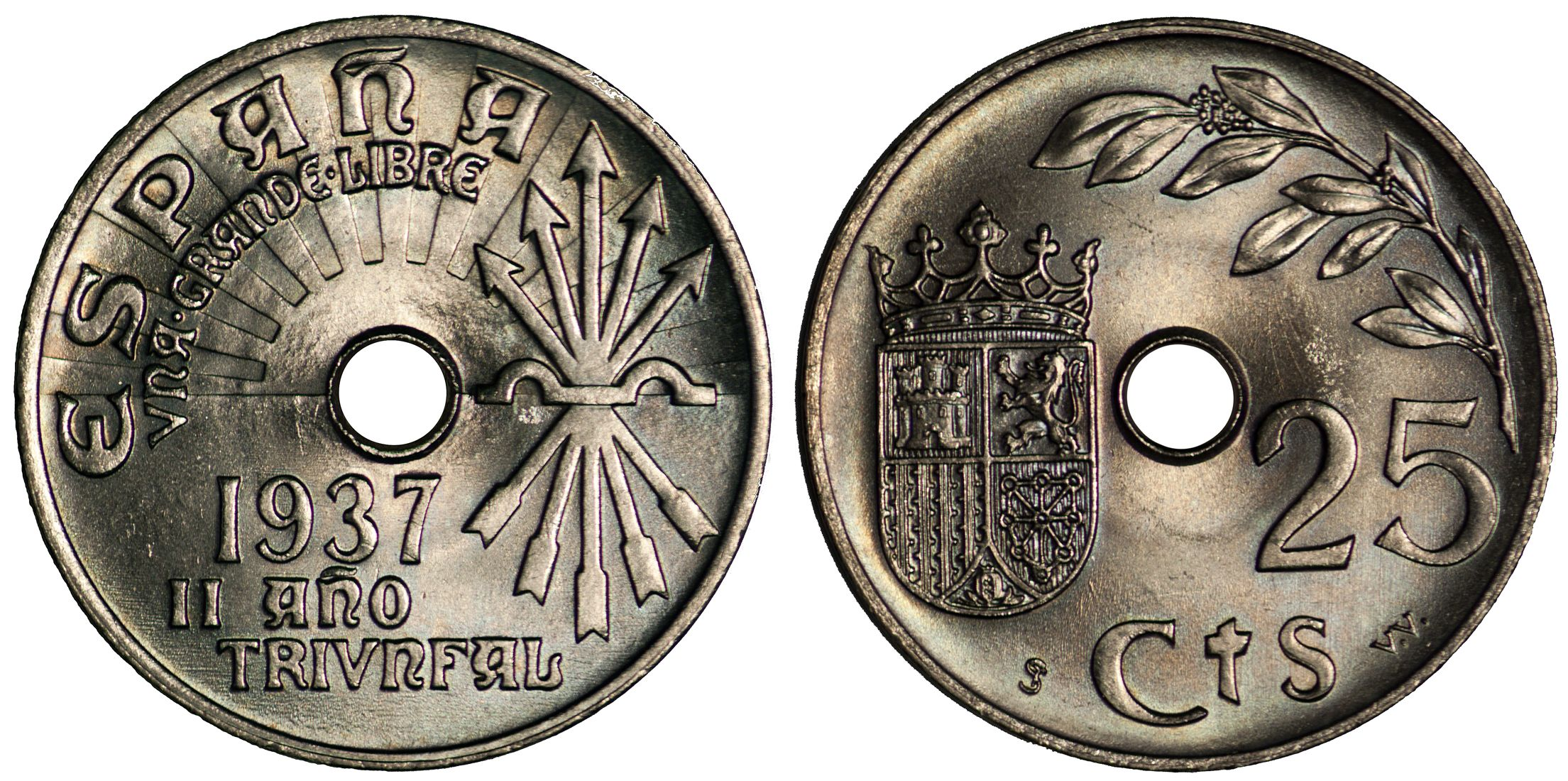
25 cent coin of 1937 with the new slogans and symbols.

The seizures of their goods from revolutionary and pro-government organizations and their sympathizers were a source of income for the rebels. To manage them, the Junta created in January 1937 a Central Administrative Commission of Seized Goods in charge of their management. The provincial authorities also had to deal with this task. (Note: The quantitative importance of the seizures for the rebels is disputed. The Pennsylvanian historian Michael Seidman believes that it has been exaggerated by historiography and that it is far from the revenue obtained from taxes and donations. Seidman (2011, p. 176))

In November 1936, a Foreign Currency Committee was created to control the foreign currencies of other countries. In March 1937, the Committee granted a period of one month for everyone to declare the foreign currencies, shares, bonds and gold in their possession. The new authorities controlled all foreign transactions. All exports were collected in strong foreign currencies, which were deposited within three days at the Military Delegation of the Treasury. The exports helped to pay for the war effort. The Burgos Royal Mint obtained substantial resources from the jewelry and securities donated by the population. Only at the end of 1937 was it totally controlled by the Junta Técnica del Estado.

== Change of presidency ==
As a result of the plane crash that took the life of General Mola on June 3, 1937, Franco decided that his replacement in command of the Army of the North would be Dávila. To relieve him at the head of the Junta, he appointed General Francisco Gómez-Jornada. Like his predecessor, he had fought in Cuba and Morocco, where he became Chief of Staff of the Army of Africa, played a decisive role in the negotiations with France and was High Commissioner. His political significance was greater than Dávila's because he had been a member of Primo de Rivera's Military Directory. Of monarchist ideas, he was considered liberal in that context, mainly because his age and training distanced him notably from fascism. He was loyal, hard-working and honest, and enjoyed Franco's confidence.

It seems that Jordana was reluctant to take up the post, and realized from the outset the difficulties of his performance, acknowledging in his diary that he was "truly disheartened by the impossibility of arranging this tangle". Furthermore, he believed that Franco himself was not in a fit state of mind to deal with political matters; that Nicolás Franco, secretary general of the head of State, was "a brilliant and extraordinary man, but unbalanced" and that he acted without any coordination with the Junta; that the functioning of the Junta was very defective; that it did not have control of the press; that foreign affairs were in the hands of José Antonio Sangróniz; that Queipo de Llano acted with total autonomy and without obeying anyone; and that there was a clear political divergence between a Junta in which the military, Catholics and primorriveristas predominated and a Movement controlled by Serrano Súñer and the Falangists. Consequently, at the beginning of October 1937, Jordana advised Franco either to carry out a profound renovation of the Junta or to form a proper government. In this he coincided with the opinion of Serrano, who by then had become Franco's main political advisor. Although Franco was slow to put the advice into practice, as early as October he announced the forthcoming formation of a government.

== Foreign policy ==
There was a Secretariat of Foreign Relations headed by the diplomat Francisco Serrat, but it was Sangroniz who really acted as minister in the shadow together with Nicolás Franco. However, General Franco could use different collaborators for his negotiations, but he always reserved for himself the predominant role in diplomacy.

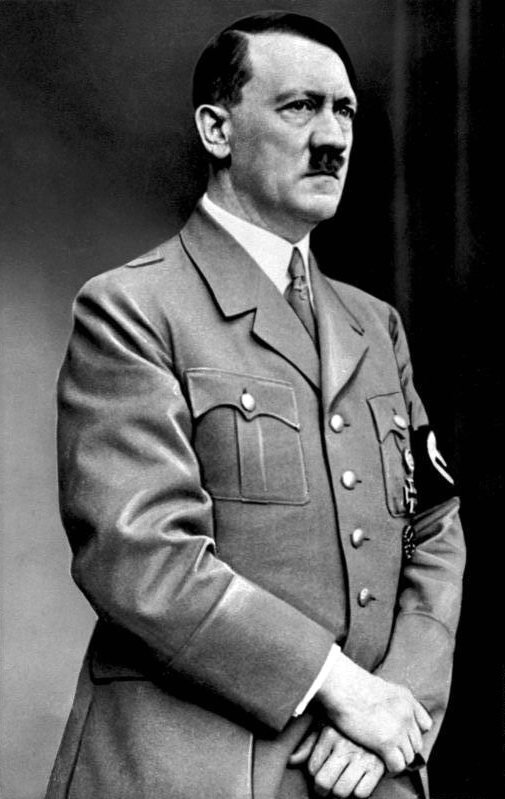
The claim for mining concessions raised tensions with Hitler's Germany despite the close alliance.

In June 1937, the debt to Germany already amounted to 150 million marks and Hitler openly expressed his intention to obtain the Spanish iron ore. The following month, taking advantage of the battle of Brunete, the Germans obtained some economic advantages. Ambassador von Faupel and the new president of the Junta, Jordana, signed a document on June 12 (Note: Luis Suarez indicates the date of July 12 for this first protocol, that is, only three days before the subsequent joint declaration. Suárez (1999, p. 568)) in which the rebels undertook to sign a trade agreement with Germany, to inform it of their economic contacts with other states and to give it most-favored-nation treatment. On July 15 a new joint declaration was signed committing mutual aid in the exchange of raw materials, foodstuffs and manufactured goods.

The next day, Spain undertook to pay the war debt in marks at 4% interest. The HISMA-ROWAK companies dominated trade and the new German ambassador, Eberhard von Stohrer, arrived with the task of controlling all Spanish foreign trade with priority for Germany.

On October 9, 1937, Franco passed a decree-law declaring null and void all concessions made by any authority. The regulation has been the subject of diverse interpretations by historians, but the Germans perceived it as an attack on their interests because it prevented HISMA money from being invested in the purchase of mining interests. The Junta Técnica explained to them that the objective was to stop the concessions made by the Valencia government, but the Germans were suspicious of Spanish-British commercial relations.

Germany was seeking the recognition of property titles in seventy-three mining concessions thanks to the debt money managed by the Montana consortium, something that the October decree-law had prevented. To get around the obstacle, they asked that the Germans be put on an equal footing with the Spaniards for the purposes of the law. The Spaniards refused, saying that the Mining Law in force only allowed the presence of 20 to 25% of foreign capital, and that it imposed that the directors should be Spanish. They recommended waiting for the formation of the new government.

On December 15 and 16, 1937, Von Stohrer met with Sangróniz and Nicolás Franco, from whom he demanded the 73 mining concessions on which HISMA had an option to purchase. Both refused to authorize all the sales en bloc. On the 20th, von Stohrer, accompanied by Johannes Bernhardt, met with General Franco himself. The latter, in a bitter conversation, repeated his brother's refusal. Around January 25, 1938, the ambassador met with Jordana, president of the Junta Técnica. Jordana again refused a block authorization, although he promised to study each case individually. The fall of Teruel at the beginning of January 1938 weakened Franco's position against the demands of his allies.

== The repression ==
The Junta Técnica had no direct involvement in the more violent repression, which was carried out by the Armed Forces and directly supervised by Franco in his capacity as commander-in-chief. General Martínez Anido, famous for his persecution of anarchists in the early 1920s, was appointed director of Internal Security on October 31, 1937, but was in charge of such matters as censorship of spectacles and control of market abuses.

The Junta did participate in the purge of public employees. On December 5, 1936, it decreed the separation from service of public servants of all kinds who were considered contrary to the "Movimiento Nacional". No appeal could be lodged before the courts of justice against the resolution which put an end to the procedure.

== Creation of the first government ==
After the transfer of Franco's headquarters to Burgos, Serrano Suñer drafted the Ley de Administración Central del Estado, a true "institutional charter" of the Government approved on January 30, 1938. This gave way to an executive with eleven ministerial portfolios that replaced the dispersed and inefficient previous administration. The composition of this government was the first political exercise of Franco, who tried to ensure that all the tendencies existing in the rebel side were represented in it and that none was predominant. The then president of the Junta Técnica, Jordana, was appointed Vice President of the Government and Minister of Foreign Affairs.

== See also ==
- Comisión de Cultura y Enseñanza

== Bibliography ==
- Casanova, Julian (2007). Historia de España 8. República y guerra civil (in Spanish). Barcelona: Marcial Pons. p. 357. ISBN 978-84-8432-878-0.
- Crozier, Brian (1969). Franco, historia y biografía. I (in Spanish). Madrid: Magisterio Español S.A. pp. 316–382. ISBN 84-265-7048-8.
- García Lahiguera, Fernando (1983). Ramón Serrano Súñer. Un documento para la Historia (in Spanish). Barcelona: Argos Vergara. pp. 119–124. ISBN 84-7178-679-6.
- Jackson, Gabriel (2010). La República española y la guerra civil (in Spanish). Barcelona: Crítica. p. 443. ISBN 978-84-08-05500-6.
- Morente Valero, Francisco (2001). "La muerte de una ilusión: el Magisterio español en la Guerra Civil y el primer franquismo". Historia y comunicación social (in Spanish) (6). Madrid: Complutense University of Madrid: 187–201. ISSN 1137-0734.
- Navarro Cardoso, Fernando. "José María Pemán y la depuración universitaria". Proyecto de investigación: La evolución de la ciencia penal española durante la Segunda República, la Guerra Civil y el "Nuevo Estado" (in Spanish). Huelva: University of Huelva: 1–12.
- Payne, Stanley G. (1987). El régimen de Franco (in Spanish). Madrid: Alianza Editorial. pp. 179–317. ISBN 84-206-9553-X.
- Preston, Paul (1994). Franco, "Caudillo de España" (in Spanish). Barcelona: Grijalbo. pp. 236–322. ISBN 84-253-2498-X.
- Ranzato, Gabriele (2006). El eclipse de la democracia (in Spanish). Madrid: Siglo XXI. pp. 508–509. ISBN 978-84-323-1248-9.
- Redondo, Gonzalo (1993). Historia de la Iglesia en España 1931-1939. Tomo II. La Guerra Civil (1936-1939) (in Spanish). Madrid: Ediciones Rialp. pp. 132–133. ISBN 84-321-3016-8.
- Seidman, Michael (2011). La victoria nacional (in Spanish). Madrid: Alianza Editorial. pp. 131–231. ISBN 978-84-206-0863-1.
- Suárez, Luis (1999). Franco, crónica de un tiempo. I. El general de la Monarquía, la República y la Guerra Civil (in Spanish). Madrid. pp. 333–593. ISBN 84-87863-78-7.
- Thomas, Hugh (1976). La Guerra Civil Española (in Spanish). Barcelona. pp. 473–795. ISBN 84-253-2767-9.
- Tusell, Javier (1997). "La Junta Técnica del Estado". La Guerra Civil Española: El avance rebelde (in Spanish). Barcelona: Ediciones Folio S.A. pp. 70–82. ISBN 84-413-0437-8.

Preceded by National Defense Junta	Junta Técnica del Estado (State Technical Junta); 1936–1938	Succeeded by Franco I
