= First government of Francisco Franco =

1938–1939 government of Spain

1st government of Francisco Franco
- Government of Spain
- 1938–1939
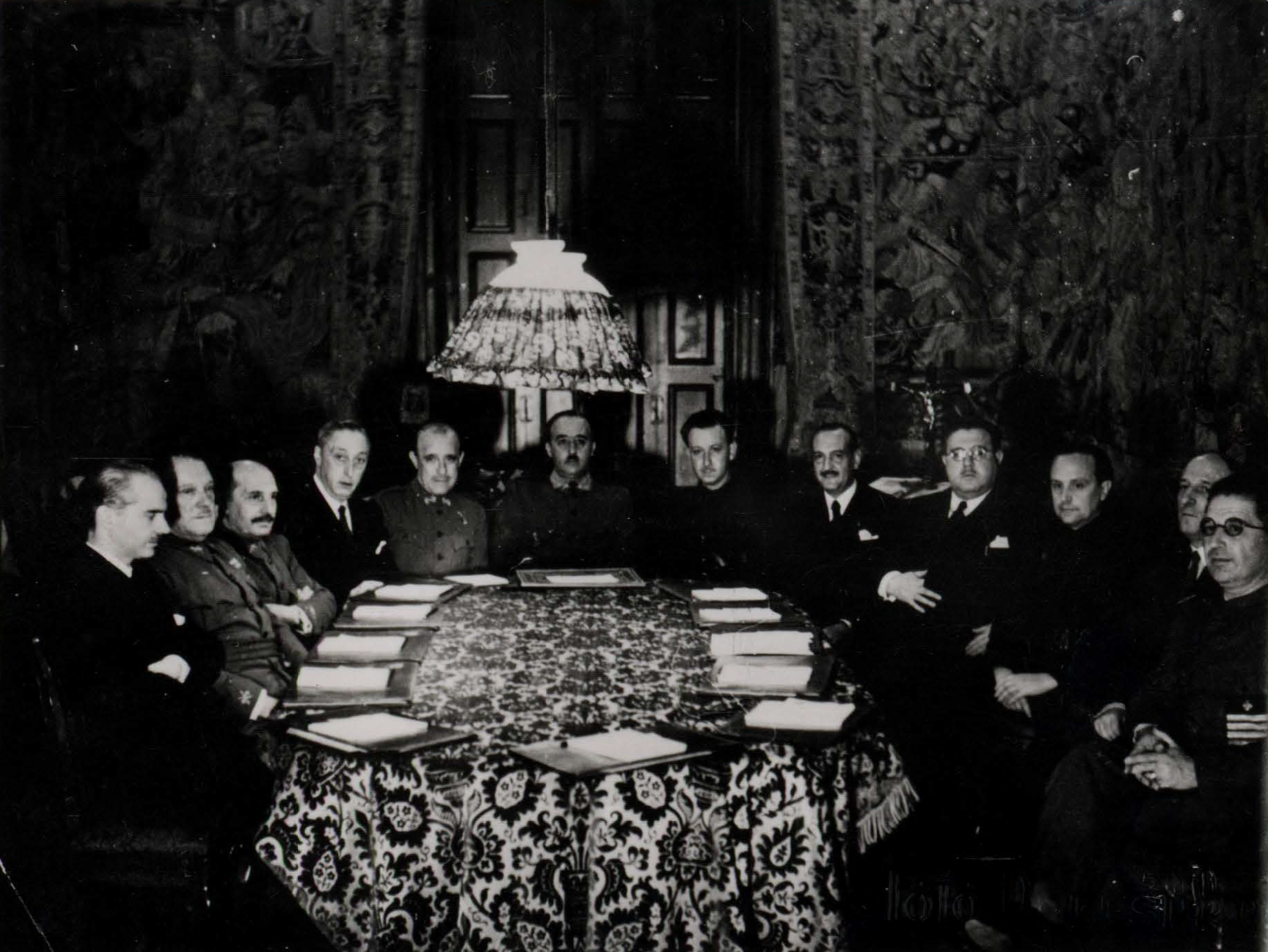
- The government in February 1938
- Date formed: 31 January 1938
- Date dissolved: 9 August 1939

People and organisations
- Head of State: Francisco Franco
- Prime Minister: Francisco Franco
- Deputy Prime Minister: Francisco Gómez-Jordana
- No. of ministers: 11 (Note: Does not include the prime minister.) (1938–1939); 10 (1939)
- Total no. of members: 11
- Member party: FET–JONS
- Status in legislature: One-party state

History
- Budget: 1939
- Predecessor: Technical State Junta (Nationalist); National Defence Council (Republican)
- Successor: Franco II

The first government of Francisco Franco was formed on 31 January 1938 during the Spanish Civil War, shortly after having been proclaimed as Head of State of Spain. It succeeded the Technical State Junta in the Nationalist zone—eventually, it would also take over from the Republican National Defence Council at the end of the war—and was the government of Spain from 31 January 1938 to 9 August 1939, (Note: Disputed with the Second Spanish Republic until 1 April 1939.) a total of 555 days, or 1 year, 6 months and 9 days.

A war cabinet, it was made up of members from various factions that would go on to form the National Movement: the FET y de las JONS party—the only legal political party in the Nationalist zone after the approval of the Unification Decree in April 1937—and the military, as well as a number of aligned-nonpartisan figures.

== Council of Ministers ==
The Council of Ministers was structured into the office for the prime minister and 11 ministries.

← Franco I Government → (31 January 1938 – 9 August 1939)
Portfolio	Name	Party	Took office	Left office	Ref.
Head of State; Prime Minister	Francisco Franco	Military	30 January 1938	9 June 1973	
Deputy Prime Minister; Minister of Foreign Affairs	Francisco Gómez-Jordana	Military	31 January 1938	9 August 1939	
Minister of Justice	Tomás Domínguez Arévalo	FET–JONS^{/Trad.}	31 January 1938	9 August 1939	
Minister of National Defence	Fidel Dávila Arrondo	Military	31 January 1938	9 August 1939	
Minister of Public Order	Severiano Martínez Anido	Military	31 January 1938	24 December 1938†	
Minister of the Interior	Ramón Serrano Suñer	FET–JONS	31 January 1938	2 February 1938	
Minister of Finance	Andrés Amado Reygondaud	FET–JONS^{/NP}	31 January 1938	9 August 1939	
Minister of Industry and Trade	Juan Antonio Suanzes	FET–JONS	31 January 1938	9 August 1939	
Minister of Agriculture	Raimundo Fernández-Cuesta	FET–JONS	31 January 1938	9 August 1939	
Minister of National Education	Pedro Sainz Rodríguez	FET–JONS^{/NP}	31 January 1938	28 April 1939	
Minister of Public Works	Alfonso Peña Boeuf	FET–JONS^{/NP}	31 January 1938	20 July 1945	
Minister of Trade Union Organization and Action	Pedro González Bueno	FET–JONS	31 January 1938	9 August 1939	
=== Changes February 1938 ===
Portfolio	Name	Faction	Took office	Left office	Ref.
Minister of the Interior; Secretary of the Government of the State	Ramón Serrano Suñer	FET–JONS	2 February 1938	1 January 1939	
=== Changes December 1938 ===
Portfolio	Name	Faction	Took office	Left office	Ref.
Minister of Public Order	Francisco Gómez-Jordana served in interim capacity from 23 December 1938 to 1 January 1939.				
=== Changes January 1939 ===
Portfolio	Name	Faction	Took office	Left office	Ref.
Minister of Governance; Secretary of the Government of the State	Ramón Serrano Suñer	FET–JONS	1 January 1939	18 October 1940	
~~Minister of Public Order~~ (Note: On 1 January 1939, the Ministry of Public Order was disestablished and its competences transferred to the Governance department.)	Disestablished on 1 January 1939.				
=== Changes April 1939 ===
Portfolio	Name	Faction	Took office	Left office	Ref.
Minister of National Education	Tomás Domínguez Arévalo served in interim capacity from 28 April to 9 August 1939.				
=== Changes June 1939 ===
Portfolio	Name	Faction	Took office	Left office	Ref.
Minister of Governance	Fidel Dávila Arrondo served in interim capacity from 1 to 14 June 1939.				

== Departmental structure ==
Francisco Franco's first government was organised into several superior and governing units, whose number, powers and hierarchical structure varied depending on the ministerial department.

Unit/body rank

- (■) Undersecretary
- (■) National service
- (◆) Military and intelligence agency

Office (Original name)	Portrait	Name	Took office	Left office	Alliance/party	Ref.
=== Prime Minister's Office ===
Prime Minister (Presidencia del Gobierno)		Francisco Franco	30 January 1938	9 June 1973	FET–JONS (Military)	
Prime Minister (Presidencia del Gobierno)	31 January 1938 – 9 August 1939: (■) National Service for General Policy and Coordination					
Deputy Prime Minister (Vicepresidencia del Gobierno)		Francisco Gómez-Jordana	31 January 1938	9 August 1939	FET–JONS (Military)	
Deputy Prime Minister (Vicepresidencia del Gobierno)	31 January 1938 – 9 August 1939: (■) Undersecretariat of the Deputy Prime Minister's Office; (■) Geographic and Statistical Institute (disest. 3 May 1938); (■) Geographic and Cadastral Institute (est. 3 May 1938); (■) National Service for Morocco and Colonies; (■) National Service for Supplies and Transports (until 22 Mar 1938); See Ministry of Foreign Affairs					
Government Secretariat (Secretaría del Gobierno)		Ramón Serrano Suñer	2 February 1938	21 October 1940	FET–JONS	
Government Secretariat (Secretaría del Gobierno)	See Ministry of the Interior (2 February 1938 – 1 January 1939); See Ministry of Governance (1 January – 9 August 1939)					
=== Ministry of Foreign Affairs ===
Ministry of Foreign Affairs (Ministerio de Asuntos Exteriores)		Francisco Gómez-Jordana	31 January 1938	9 August 1939	FET–JONS (Military)	
Ministry of Foreign Affairs (Ministerio de Asuntos Exteriores)	31 January – 16 February 1938: (■) Undersecretariat of Foreign Affairs; (■) National Service for Foreign Policy; (■) National Service for International Treaties; (■) National Service for Relations with the Holy See; (■) National Service for Protocol; 16 February 1938 – 9 August 1939: (■) Undersecretariat of Foreign Affairs; (■) National Service for Policy and Treaties; (■) National Service for Administrative Affairs					
=== Ministry of Justice ===
Ministry of Justice (Ministerio de Justicia)		Tomás Domínguez Arévalo	31 January 1938	9 August 1939	FET–JONS (Traditionalist)	
Ministry of Justice (Ministerio de Justicia)	31 January 1938 – 9 August 1939: (■) Undersecretariat of Justice; (■) National Service for Justice; (■) National Service for Registries and Notaries; (■) National Service for Prisons; (■) National Service for Ecclesiastical Affairs					
=== Ministry of National Defence ===
Ministry of National Defence (Ministerio de Defensa Nacional)		Fidel Dávila Arrondo	31 January 1938	9 August 1939	FET–JONS (Military)	
Ministry of National Defence (Ministerio de Defensa Nacional)	31 January 1938 – 9 August 1939: (■) Undersecretariat of the Army; (■) Undersecretariat of the Navy; (■) Undersecretariat of the Air Force; (◆) Army Staff–Chief of Staff of the Army; (◆) Navy Staff–Chief of Staff of the Navy; (◆) Air Force Staff–Chief of Staff of the Air Force; (■) Inspectorate of the Civil Guard (from 1 Jan 1939)					
=== Ministry of Public Order ===
Ministry of Public Order (Ministerio de Orden Público) (until 1 January 1939)		Severiano Martínez Anido	31 January 1938	24 December 1938†	FET–JONS (Military)	
Ministry of Public Order (Ministerio de Orden Público) (until 1 January 1939)		Francisco Gómez-Jordana (interim)	23 December 1938	1 January 1939	FET–JONS (Military)	
Ministry of Public Order (Ministerio de Orden Público) (until 1 January 1939)	31 January 1938 – 9 August 1939: (■) Undersecretariat of Public Order; (■) Inspectorate of the Civil Guard; (■) National Service for Security; (■) National Service for Frontiers; (■) National Service for Post and Telecommunication; (■) National Service for Traffic Police					
=== Ministry of Governance ===
Ministry of the Interior (Ministerio del Interior) (until 1 January 1939) Ministry of Governance (Ministerio de la Gobernación) (from 1 January 1939)		Ramón Serrano Suñer	31 January 1938	18 October 1940	FET–JONS	
Ministry of the Interior (Ministerio del Interior) (until 1 January 1939) Ministry of Governance (Ministerio de la Gobernación) (from 1 January 1939)	31 January 1938 – 1 January 1939: (■) Undersecretariat of the Interior; (■) National Service for Internal Policy; (■) National Service for Local Administration; (■) National Service for Press; (■) National Service for Propaganda; (■) National Service for Tourism; (■) National Service for Devastated Regions and Repairs; (■) National Service for Charity; (■) National Service for Health; (■) National Service for Supplies and Transports (from 22 Mar 1938); 1 January – 9 August 1939: (■) Undersecretariat of the Interior; (■) National Service for Internal Policy; (■) National Service for Local Administration; (■) National Service for Devastated Regions and Repairs; (■) National Service for Charity and Social Works; (■) National Service for Health; (■) Undersecretariat of Public Order; (■) National Service for Security; (■) National Service for Frontiers; (■) National Service for Post and Telecommunication; (■) National Service for Traffic Police; (■) Undersecretariat for Press and Propaganda; (■) National Service for Press; (■) National Service for Propaganda; (■) National Service for Tourism					
=== Ministry of Finance ===
Ministry of Finance (Ministerio de Hacienda)		Andrés Amado Reygondaud	31 January 1938	9 August 1939	FET–JONS (Nonpartisan)	
Ministry of Finance (Ministerio de Hacienda)	31 January 1938 – 9 August 1939: (■) Undersecretariat of Finance; (■) National Service for the Comptroller's Office; (■) National Service for the Treasury; (■) National Service for Budgets; (■) National Service for Property and Territorial Contribution; (■) National Service for Public Debt and Passive Classes; (■) National Service for Public Income; (■) National Service for Customs; (■) National Service for Stamp and Monopolies; (■) National Service for State Litigation; (■) National Service for Banking, Currency and Exchange; (■) National Service for Insurance; (■) National Service for the Legal Regime of Public Limited Companies					
=== Ministry of Industry and Trade ===
Ministry of Industry and Trade (Ministerio de Industria y Comercio)		Juan Antonio Suanzes	31 January 1938	9 August 1939	FET–JONS	
Ministry of Industry and Trade (Ministerio de Industria y Comercio)	31 January 1938 – 9 August 1939: (■) Undersecretariat of Industry and Trade; (■) General Commissariat for Supplies and Transports (est. 10 Mar 1939); (■) National Service for Industry; (■) National Service for Trade and Tariff Policy; (■) National Service for Mines and Fuels; (■) National Service for Transport Tariffs; (■) National Service for Maritime Communications; (■) National Service for Maritime Fisheries; (■) National Service for Supplies and Transports (from 1 Jan 1939; disest. 10 Mar 1939)					
=== Ministry of Agriculture ===
Ministry of Agriculture (Ministerio de Agricultura)		Raimundo Fernández-Cuesta	31 January 1938	9 August 1939	FET–JONS	
Ministry of Agriculture (Ministerio de Agricultura)	31 January – 6 April 1938: (■) Undersecretariat of Agriculture; (■) National Service for Agriculture; (■) National Service for Forestry; (■) National Service for River Fisheries; (■) National Service for Livestock; (■) National Service for the Economic and Social Reform of the Land; 6 April 1938 – 9 August 1939: (■) Undersecretariat of Agriculture; (■) National Service for Wheat; (■) National Service for Agriculture; (■) National Service for Livestock; (■) National Service for Forestry, Hunting and River Fisheries; (■) National Service for the Economic and Social Reform of the Land; (■) Technical General Secretariat (est. 16 Jul 1938)					
=== Ministry of National Education ===
Ministry of National Education (Ministerio de Educación Nacional)		Pedro Sainz Rodríguez	31 January 1938	28 April 1939	FET–JONS (Nonpartisan)	
Ministry of National Education (Ministerio de Educación Nacional)		Tomás Domínguez Arévalo (interim)	28 April 1939	9 August 1939	FET–JONS	
Ministry of National Education (Ministerio de Educación Nacional)	31 January 1938 – 9 August 1939: (■) Undersecretariat of National Education; (■) National Service for Higher and Secondary Education; (■) National Service for Basic Education; (■) National Service for Professional and Technical Education; (■) National Service for Fine Arts					
=== Ministry of Public Works ===
Ministry of Public Works (Ministerio de Obras Públicas)		Alfonso Peña Boeuf	31 January 1938	20 July 1945	FET–JONS (Nonpartisan)	
Ministry of Public Works (Ministerio de Obras Públicas)	31 January 1938 – 13 May 1939: (■) Undersecretariat of Public Works; (■) National Service for Ports and Maritime Signals; (■) National Service for Hydraulic Works; (■) National Service for Roads and Railways (disest. 16 Feb 1938); (■) National Service for Roads (est. 16 Feb 1938); (■) National Service for Railways (est. 16 Feb 1938); 13 May – 9 August 1939: (■) Undersecretariat of Public Works; (■) National Service for Roads; (■) National Service for Railways and Road Transport; (■) National Service for Hydraulic Works; (■) National Service for Ports					
=== Ministry of Trade Union Organization and Action ===
Ministry of Trade Union Organization and Action (Ministerio de Organización y Acción; Sindical)		Pedro González Bueno	31 January 1938	9 August 1939	FET–JONS	
Ministry of Trade Union Organization and Action (Ministerio de Organización y Acción; Sindical)	31 January 1938 – 9 August 1939: (■) Undersecretariat of Trade Union Organization and Action; (■) National Service for Trade Unions; (■) National Service for Labour Jurisdiction and Harmony; (■) National Service for Social Forecast (disest. 13 May 1938); (■) National Service for Forecast (est. 13 May 1938); (■) National Service for Emigration; (■) National Service for Statistics					

== Bibliography ==
- Sánchez Recio, Glicerio (2013). "Familias políticas, estructuras de poder, instituciones del régimen". In Ruiz Carnicer, Miguel Ángel (ed.). Falange, las culturas políticas del fascismo en la España de Franco (1936-1975) (in Spanish). Vol. 1. Clarendon Press, University of Oxford. pp. 217–229. ISBN 978-84-9911-216-9.

Preceded by Technical; State Junta	Government of Spain; 1938–1939	Succeeded by Franco II
