= Resupply of German submarines in Spain, 1940–1944 =

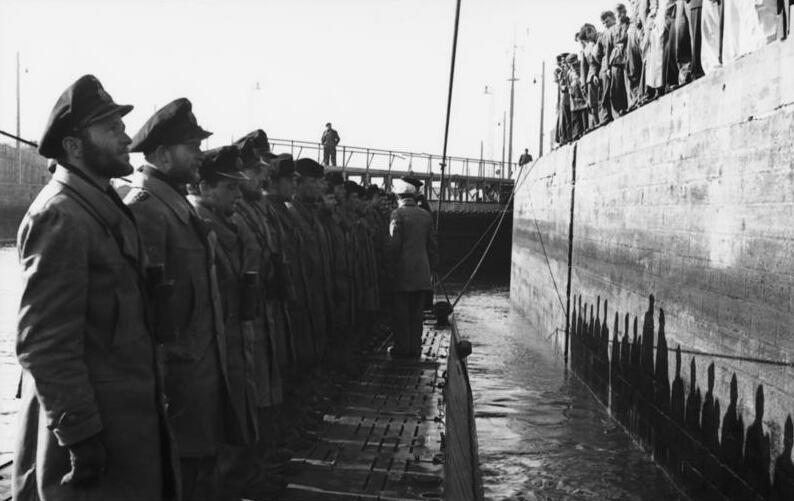
U-96, one of submarines resupplied in Spain

Between 1940 and 1944 there were some 25 cases of the resupply of German submarines in Spain. The practice was pre-agreed between both governments in 1939, but faced with British protests related to breach of neutrality commitments, Spain began to restrict the practice from late 1942.

== Background ==
The German supply system intended to serve the navy overseas, named Etappendienst, was set up in 1911. Its key section, designed to supply warships active in the Atlantic Ocean, was based in Spain, and operated during World War I, especially during 1914 and 1915. Dissolved after the First World War, the Etappendienst was re-established in the mid-1930s, initially part of the Abwehr. In mid-1938 it was moved to the Foreign Section of Oberkommando der Wehrmacht (OKW).

Although technically one of four global Etappendienst centres, Spain became the focus of the plan. In 1934 and 1935, by means of various front companies, the Germans constructed a network supposed to ensure supplies of fuel, sourced mostly in Latin American countries. Following disruption caused by the Spanish Civil War, the works were resumed in 1938. They were paired with official diplomatic efforts directed at the Franco government, and included plans for German investment and co-ownership of the CEPSA refinery in the Canary Islands. The Spanish Nationalist government remained cautious, and in early 1939 OKW issued a directive which envisioned nothing more than the "benevolent neutrality" of Spain should a major European conflict begin. This marked a German reversal in the idea of supplies through cover organizations.

== Negotiations ==
In 1939 the German and Spanish governments discussed various options for implementing resupply. Plans varied between using Spanish or German merchant ships, servicing only submarines or also surface vessels including cruisers, replenishment taking place in ports or in some isolated bays, and purchases of fuel and supplies being made in Spain or abroad. At one point, discouraged by Spanish reluctance, delays, and ambiguity, the Germans considered reverting to entirely clandestine operations, but given tightly controlled markets and heavy policing in post-war Spain, this option was abandoned as entirely unfeasible.

Given the dominant force of the British Royal Navy, the Spaniards were principally concerned with a would-be British counter-action, whilst the Germans worked under instructions not to compromise Spanish neutrality. A final agreement was reached by Juan Luis Beigbeder and Eberhard von Stohrer in November 1939. It covered submarines only: they were to draw at night alongside a German tanker anchored in port, take on supplies and leave port before dawn. Spanish authorities agreed to ignore the process and enable provisions from land depots.

== Replenishment operations ==
Sources differ and list 25 or 26 cases of German submarines resupplying in Spanish ports, taking place between January 1940 and February 1944: five in 1940; 16 in 1941; two or three in 1942; none in 1943; and either one or none in 1944. Most were scheduled operations and 3 were emergency cases. The ports used were Vigo, Las Palmas, Cádiz, and Ferrol. Overall, there were 1,508 tons of gasoil and 37 tons of heavy oil pumped. In most cases lubricants, water and foodstuffs were also delivered; in some cases navigation charts and first-aid kits were also provided. In three documented cases torpedoes were loaded.

In few cases injured or sick German sailors were taken off U-boats. Almost all cases were overnight operations, although two emergency repairs took a few days. There were four German supply ships, Thalia, Bessel, Max Albrecht and Corrientes, involved. In one case the replenishment operation was abandoned, as it turned out that the U-boat in question was damaged and unfit for the process. On the navy side the operations were co-ordinated by Oberkommando der Marine. In Spain the process was managed by the German navy attaché in Madrid, Kurt Meyer-Döhner.

== Phasing out ==
Though usually performed in total secrecy, in few cases replenishment operations lasted until daylight and even attracted some crowds watching from the shores. This alerted the British to the process, although they lacked the necessary evidence to put pressure on the Franco government. In July 1940 Franco, disappointed with Hitler's refusal to discuss Spanish territorial claims in Africa, suspended supply operations. They were resumed in March 1941. In July 1941 the British embassy in Madrid lodged a formal protest, pointing to breach of Spanish neutrality obligations.

By mid-1941 British intelligence had irrefutable proof of the operation, and in late-1941 they captured sailors from U-434, shortly after she had re-fuelled at Vigo. Following a series of protests, the Spanish terminated the operation in the Canary Islands in late-1941 and restricted the replenishment process on the mainland, in principle reducing it to emergency operations. In May 1942 the Spanish for the first time interned a German U-boat which sought refuge following combat damage. The boat was eventually sold to the Spanish Navy.
