= Marquess of Dávila =

Hereditary title of Spanish nobility

Marquessate of Dávila
- Creation date: 18 July 1949
- Created by: Francisco Franco
- First holder: Fidel Dávila Arrondo
- Last holder: Ramón Ignacio Dávila
- Remainder to: Heirs of the body of the grantee
- Status: Deprived under the Democratic Memory Law on 21 October 2022

Marquess of Dávila (Spanish: Marqués de Dávila) was a hereditary title of Spanish nobility. It was created on 18 July 1949 by Francisco Franco in favor of Fidel Dávila Arrondo, a Spanish Army general and Minister of National Defense during the Spanish Civil War.

The title was abolished on October 21, 2022, after the approval of the Democratic Memory Law.

== List of Marquesses ==
- Fidel Dávila Arrondo, 1st Marquess of Dávila (1949–1962)
- Valentín Dávila y Jalón, 2nd Marquess of Dávila (1962–2011)
- Ramón Ignacio Dávila Casas, 3rd Marquess of Dávila (2012–2022)
