= Andrés Amado Reygondaud =

Spanish politician & lawyer (1886–1960)

Andrés Amado Reygondaud de Villebardet (1886 - 1960) was a Spanish politician and lawyer.

With José Calvo Sotelo he was active in the Ministry of Finance during the dictatorship of Miguel Primo de Rivera, and took the overall leadership of the Ministry. It was Amado Reygondaud who was part of the negotiating committee which made an agreement with the Basque provinces.

During the Spanish Civil War, Amado Reygondaud chaired the Finance Committee of the Technical Board of the State under Francisco Franco and would continue later in his first government, formed on February 1, 1938. He was, in fact, the only survivor of the Technical Board to retain his position or survive the Civil War. Amado worked with Ramón Serrano Súñer in drafting the decree that established the new administrative state in February 1938. However, Amado and Serrano Suñer grew increasingly discontented with Franco's government and showed a clear dislike of the Caudillo. Serrano claimed the services at the Technical Board of the State were not regarded highly enough and that they were considered "people without merit".

== Bibliography ==
- Javier Tusell (1992): Franco en la guerra civil, Barcelona, Tusquets.
- Francisco Franco Salgado-Araujo (1976): Mis conversaciones privadas con Franco, Barcelona, Planeta.
- Ramón Serrano Suñer (1977): Memorias. Entre el Silencio y la Propaganda, la Historia como fue, Barcelona, Planeta.
