= José Cortés López =

Spanish jurist and former minister of justice (1883–1958)

Minister of Justice
- In office 3 October 1936 – 31 October 1938

Personal details
- Born: 13 September 1883 Baeza, Jaén
- Died: 1958 (aged 74–75)
- Education: University of Seville

José Cortés López (1883–1958) was a Spanish magistrate. He was the justice minister at the initial phase of Francoist Spain, which he held between 1936 and 1938.

== Early life and education ==
Cortés was born in Baeza, Jaén, on 13 September 1883. He received a law degree from the University of Seville and graduated in 1913.

== Career ==
Following graduation, Cortés held various legal posts. He was appointed president of the Chamber of Las Palmas in September 1934 and then appointed civil governor of Las Palmas. On 3 October 1936, he was named as president of the Justice Commission, which was equivalent to minister of justice. He was in office until 31 October 1938. After working at different courts, he was promoted to magistrate of the Supreme Court.

== Personal life and death ==
On 24 September 1958 Cortés was awarded the Grand Cross of Saint Raymond of Peñafort. He died the same year.
