= Luis Suárez Fernández =

Spanish historian (1924–2024)

Luis Fernandez
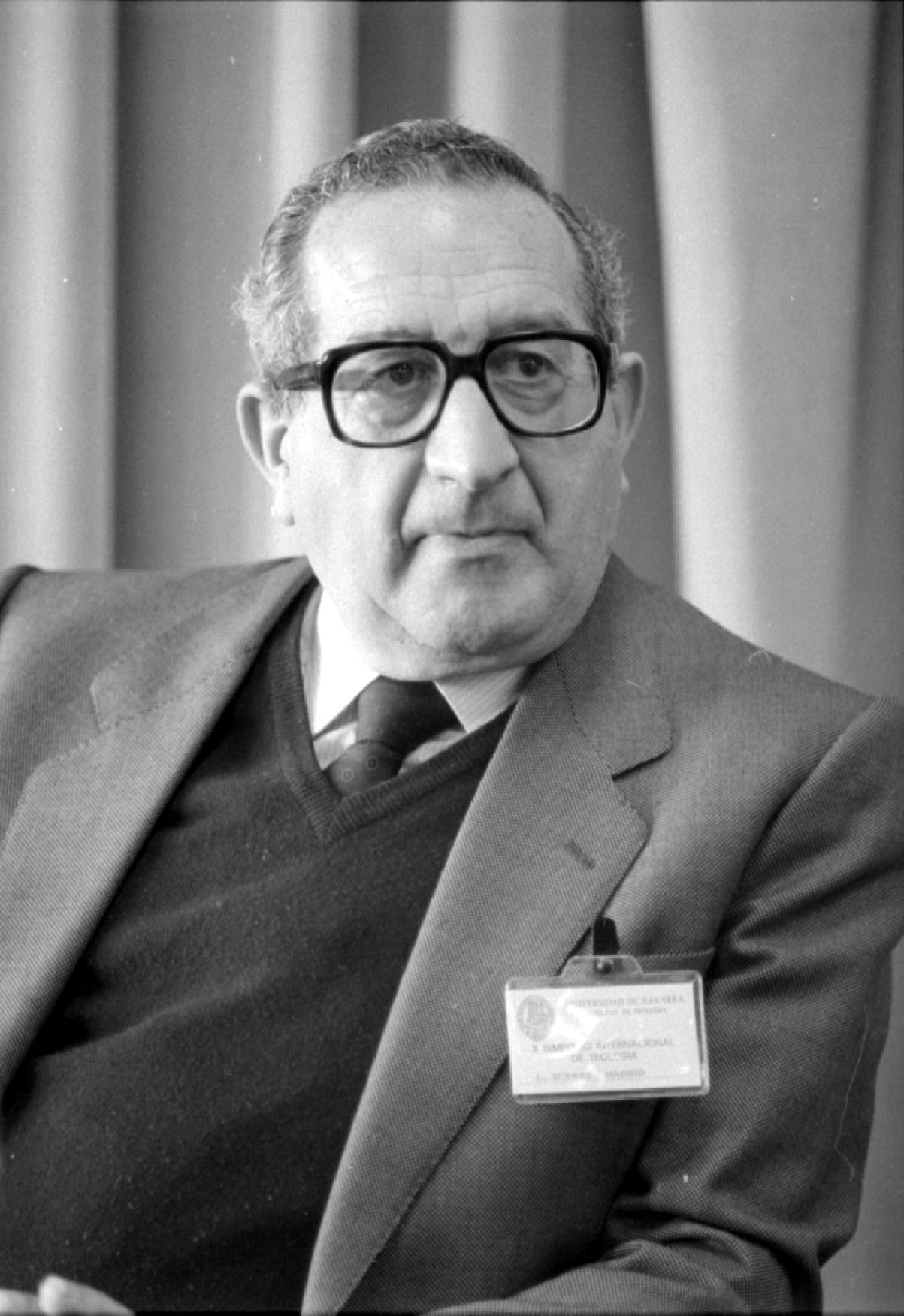
- Suárez Fernández in 1989
- Born: 25 June 1924; Gijón, Spain
- Died: 15 December 2024 (aged 100)
- Education: Complutense University of Madrid (PhD)

Luis Suárez Fernández (25 June 1924 – 15 December 2024) was a Spanish historian, originally a medievalist, who has extended his studies to include modern and recent history. He belonged to a line of Spanish historians that are in full agreement with Francoism and by some is named a revisionist.

== Life and work ==
Suárez was born in Gijón. He studied philosophy and literature at the universities of Oviedo and Valladolid, receiving his doctorate in history on 16 June 1947 from the University of Madrid. In 1955 he obtained a professorship of Pre- and Universal History of Antiquity and the Middle Ages and General Cultural History (Prehistoria e Historia Universal de las Edades Antigua y Media y de Historia General de la Cultura) at Valladolid, where he rose to the posts of dean (1963) and rector (1965). As rector he founded the first chair in theatre at the university. In 1972 the government made him Director General of Universities and Investigation (Universidades e Investigación).

In 1975, Suárez took up the chair of medieval history at the recently inaugurated Autonomous University of Madrid. That same year he became director of the Escuela Española en Roma de Arqueología e Historia of CSIC, a Spanish cultural society in Rome. He had been chief of the medieval studies section since 1956; he was overall director until 1978. Suárez was a professor emeritus of medieval history in the department of Ancient and Medieval History, Paleography, and Diplomatics (Historia Antigua, Medieval, Paleografía y Diplomática) at the Autonomous University.

Politically right-wing in orientation, Suárez had connections with the Francisco Franco National Foundation (FNFF), who are alleged to have funded the publication of Francisco Franco y su tiempo (1984). Suárez was also the president of the Hermandad del Valle de los Caídos. These ties to Francoism have garnered the denunciation of fellow historian Javier Tusell, among others. He authored the entry for Francisco Franco in the 2011 Diccionario Biográfico Español, published by the Real Academia de la Historia, which has been denounced by historians as being Francoist propaganda.

Fernández was also an active Catholic and a member of Opus Dei.

He was elected to medalla nº 4 of the Real Academia de la Historia on 7 May 1993; he took up his seat on 23 January 1994.

Fernández turned 100 on 25 June 2024, and died on 15 December 2024.

== Recognition ==
- Premio Nacional de Historia de España (2001)
- Correspondent of the Real Academia de las Buenas Letras de Barcelona
- Emeritus member of the Real Academia de Portugal
- Member of the Real Academia de la Historia (1994)
- Member of the Permanent Commission of the Historical Congresses of the Crown of Aragon (Comisión Permanente de los Congresos de Historia de la Corona de Aragón)
- Member of the Spanish Committee of Historical Sciences (Comité Español de Ciencias Históricas)
- Gran Cruz del Mérito Civil
- Gran Cruz de Isabel La Católica
- Gran Cruz de Alfonso X el Sabio
- Gran Cruz del Mérito Militar with distinction (con distintivo blanco)
- Commendation of the Orden de Enrique o Navigador

== Bibliography ==
- Documentos acerca de la expulsión de los judíos (1964)
- Europa: una conciencia historica en la encrucijada (1972)
- Manual de historia universal (1973)
- Grandes interpretaciones de la historia (1976)
- Historia de España antigua y media (1976)
- Relaciones entre Portugal y Castilla en la época del Infante don Enrique, 1393–1460 (1977)
- Judíos españoles en la edad media (1980)
- Francisco Franco y su tiempo (1984)
- Fernando el católico y Navarra (1985)
- Los Reyes Católicos (1989)
- La Época de Franco (1992), with José Andrés Gallego
- Las Instituciones castellano-leonesas y portuguesas antes del Tratado de Tordesillas (1995), with José Ignacio Gutiérrez Nieto
- Franco, Crónica de Un Tiempo (2003)
- Principado de Asturias: Un proceso de señorialización regional (2003)
- Lo que el mundo le debe a España (2009)
