= Johannes Bernhardt =

Spanish-German businessman and SS member

- Born: January 1, 1897; Ostroda
- Died: November 13, 1980 (aged 83); Munich
- Burial place: Madrid's Cementerio Civil
- Occupation: Businessman
- Organization: Nazi Party

Johannes Eberhard Franz Bernhardt (1 January 1897 – 13 November 1980) was a Spanish-German businessman and SS member. He played an important role during the Spanish Civil War and was chief link between Germany and Spain. He reached the rank of SS general.

After the outbreak of the Spanish Civil War, he played an important role in sending German weapons and supplies to the rebel forces. He was one of the architects of German military and economic aid to Franco's Spain. During the war he also organized a small business empire that he put at the service of the Third Reich. He would also receive the honorary rank of Oberführer.

== Biography ==
He was born on January 1, 1897, in Ostroda (then East Prussia). His father, a merchant, died when Bernhardt was a few years old. Between 1906 and 1914, he studied at Ratibor where his family had moved.

After the outbreak of the World War I, Bernhardt was recruited and fought on the Eastern Front. He would be given Iron Cross in recognition of his actions. After the war he became a prosperous businessman in Hamburg, where he owned a shipping company. His company collapsed due to crash of 1929, so he emigrated to Spanish Morocco. In Spanish Morocco, he was employed by H&O Wilmer. He became well-known person in colonial garrison circles and managed to create good relations with some Spanish army officers.

In April 1933, shortly after the Nazi takeover, Bernhardt joined the NSDAP/AO. He became a collaborator of the Sicherheitsdienst a year later.

During the Spanish Civil War, he offered his services to Franco. On July 25, 1936, he with the Spanish captain Francisco Arranz Monasterio and the local Nazi leader Adolf P. Langenheim met with Adolf Hitler in Bayreuth, during which the decision was made to support the rebellious side. This constituted the first step for German involvement in the Spanish Civil War. On the way back to Spain, he also reached an agreement with the Portuguese dictator Antonio de Oliveira Salazar so that German war materials and fuel could pass to the rebellious area through the port of Lisbon, thus avoiding the blockade of the republican army.

After returning to Spain, he would be one of the founders of the Sociedad Hispano-Marroquí de Transportes (HISMA), a "ghost" company in charge of the trade and supply of German war material to the rebel forces. HISMA would later be included within the 'Sofindus' conglomerate, which continued to have great activity during the World War II. On one occasion Bernhardt intervened in the acquisition of a medical shipment of penicillin that the Allies had sent to Spain, and diverted it to Germany. Due to his economic activities, he would end up becoming one of the main Nazi agents in Spain. This led him to have a role that went beyond the merely economic.

After World War II, he managed to establish links with the Allied authorities and became an informant for Operation Safehaven. Due to this, Allies granted him freedom of movement within Spain, and gave control over a number of companies whose resources amounted to 8 million pesetas. In April 1945, Bernhardt called a meeting at his house which resulted in the creation of Bernhardt's ratline which distributed aid to the Germans fleeing Allied prosecution. He funded the structures which secured the wellbeing of the right-wing extremists.

Bernhardt also maintained close relations with Francisco Franco, who gave him a personal gift of 1.4 million pesetas once the civil war ended. In 1946, he was granted Spanish nationality. After the war, he lived unnoticed in Denia. In 1947, he founded the production company Sagitario Films, in order to launder the millions of pesetas accumulated by his activities.

In 1953, he settled in Argentina, where he continued to operate various businesses. He died in 1980. Scholars argue on the place of his death. Some say he died in Munich, while others assert that he died in Argentina. His gravestone was found in Madrid.

== See also ==
- Otto Skorzeny
