= Nicolás Franco (politician) =

Spanish politician (1891–1977)

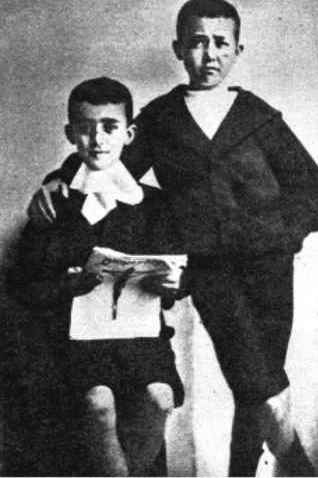
Francisco Franco and his brother Nicolás, as boys at a college

Nicolás Franco Bahamonde (1 July 1891 – 15 April 1977) was a Spanish naval officer and politician and the elder brother of the later Spanish caudillo Francisco Franco and of Ramón Franco, a pioneer of aviation.

== Biography ==
Officer in the Naval Engineer Corps of the Spanish Navy, in 1935 he was director of the Merchant Navy.

He was head of the General Secretariat of the Head of State in the government of his brother, the general Francisco Franco, from 1936 to 1938.

Nicolás Franco served as ambassador to Portugal and was the chief Spanish architect and negotiator of the Iberian Pact. In 1942 he was promoted to general of the Naval Engineering Corps.

He was married to María Isabel Pascual del Pobil y Ravello, with whom he had a son, Nicolás Franco y Pascual de Pobil.
