= Francisco Gómez-Jordana Sousa =

Spanish soldier and politician

The Most Excellent The Count of Jordana
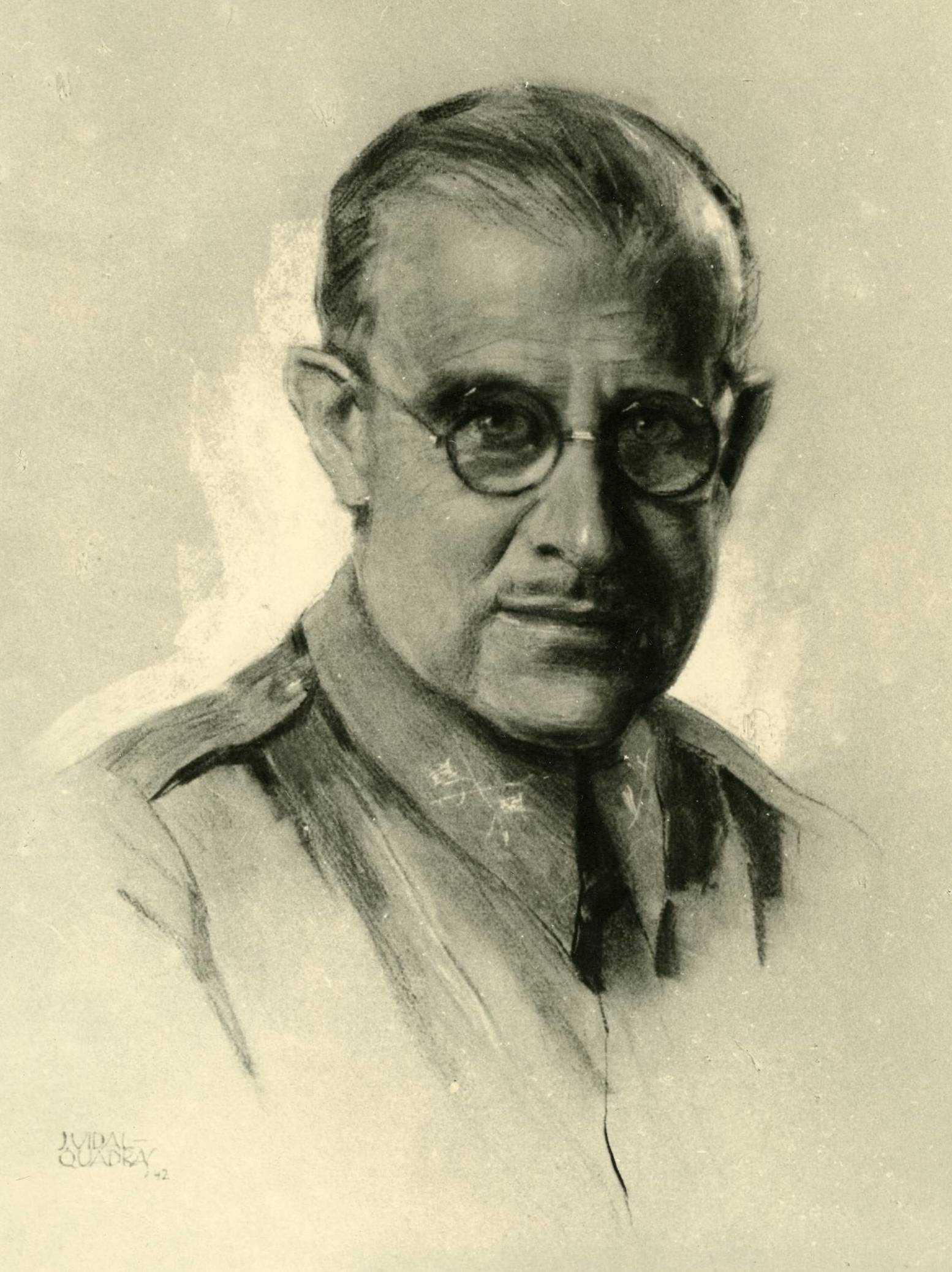
- The Count of Jordana in 1940

Minister of Foreign Affairs
- In office 3 September 1942 – 2 August 1944
- Preceded by: Ramón Serrano Súñer
- Succeeded by: José Félix de Lequerica
- In office 30 January 1938 – 9 August 1939
- Preceded by: Julio Álvarez del Vayo
- Succeeded by: Juan Luis Beigbeder y Atienza

Deputy Prime Minister
- In office 30 January 1938 – 9 August 1939
- Preceded by: Diego Martínez Barrio (1933–34)
- Succeeded by: Agustín Muñoz Grandes (1962–67)

President of the Technical State Junta
- In office 3 June 1937 – 30 January 1938
- Preceded by: Fidel Dávila Arrondo
- Succeeded by: Francisco Franco (as Prime Minister)

Personal details
- Born: Francisco Gómez-Jordana y Sousa; 1 February 1876 Madrid, Kingdom of Spain
- Died: 3 August 1944 (aged 68) San Sebastián, Spain

Francisco Gómez-Jordana y Sousa, 1st Count de Jordana (1 February 1876 – 3 August 1944), was a Spanish soldier and politician who served as Minister of Foreign Affairs during the rule of Francisco Franco.

== Early life ==
Born in Madrid, the son of an officer who went on to become a General and the High Military Commissioner of Spain in Morocco, Gómez-Jordana enrolled as a student at Spain's "Academia General Militar" (Military General Academy) in Zaragoza in 1892.

== Early career ==
During the Cuban War of Independence, he went to Cuba as a second lieutenant, where he was wounded on 23 November 1896. After returning to Spain, he became a captain at the Escuela Superior de Guerra ("Higher School for the Conduct of War") in Madrid. In 1911, he went to Melilla, a historical Spanish stronghold in North Africa since 1497, and he joined his father, Colonel Francisco Gómez Jordana. The younger Gómez-Jordana became a lieutenant colonel in 1912 and a colonel in 1915.

From 9 July 1915 to 27 January 1919, he served his first of two terms as High Commissioner of Spain in Morocco, the third being registered in April 1913. He became General of Brigade in 1922.

After 13 September 1923 coup d'état, led by General Miguel Primo de Rivera, Gómez-Jordana became a member of the Military Directory. Primo de Rivera conferred upon him wide powers to deal with colonial initiatives in Africa, including the "peacemaking resorts" within the Spanish protectorate in Morocco.

== Action in Morocco ==
On 8 September 1925, General Leopoldo Saro Marín, along with Colonel Billot and Colonel Freydenberg, both of France enacted a joint naval landing attack at Al Hoceima, Rif. In what is now referred to as the Al Hoceima landings, the attack was directed against rebel Kabilas in northern Morocco. The operation featured the first amphibious landing of tanks. The naval forces employed massive air and gunfire support, directed by spotting personnel with communication devices.

After the success of the attack, the King awarded Marín the title of 1st Count of La Playa de Ixdain and General Gómez-Jordana the title of 1st Count of Jordana. The titles were awarded on 19 July 1926 at the town of Úbeda, province of Jaén. Alfonso later honoured the Africanist General José Sanjurjo y Sacanell for the "peacemaking actions" in the Rif and invested him as 1st Marqués del Rif in 1927.

The military actions led to the exile of the Rif independence leader Muhammad Ibn 'Abd al-Karim al-Khattabi, commonly known as Abd el-Krim, from Ajdir in the Berber area of Morocco, a locus of the resistance movement. Abd el-Krim had been known as the creator of the Confederal Republic of the tribes of the Rif (Amazigh: Tagduda n Arif) since 1921.

Between November 1928 and 19 April 1931, Gómez-Jordana served another term as High Commissioner.

Among other Africanist military men was Spanish General Dámaso Berenguer y Fusté. In 1927, he had been awarded the title of Count of Xauen for his military actions in the conquest of Xauen, in northern Morocco, in 1920. Dámaso acted as the second "soft" dictator, a term then used by Spanish civilians in comparison to Primo de Rivera, from 30 January 1930 to 18 January 1931. His term as Minister for War coincided with the term of Jacobo Fitz-James Stuart, 17th Duke of Alba as Minister of State and Public Instruction.

== Struggle in the army ==
Broadly speaking, the XVIII and XIX Military Academies in Spain had been located traditionally at Toledo, Infantry, 1850, Segovia, Artillery, 1764, Alcalá de Henares, Engineers, 1803, Valladolid, Cavalry, 1852. One joint, basic General Military Academy, the Academia General Militar, was created during the times of King Alfonso XII on 20 February 1882 at Zaragoza.

On 17 August 1930, the so-called Pact of San Sebastián, was led on one side by the rightist leaders Miguel Maura, the son of the Majorcan conservative prime minister of Spain, and Duke Antonio Maura and Niceto Alcalá-Zamora.

They banded together with members of other rather small liberal and regionalist republican parties and called for action to support modern civil liberties and progress in education.

On 14 April 1931, the Second Spanish Republic was approved by the masses after the earlier municipal elections and the dissolution of the royally+approved Military Directorate (1923–1931).

A civil law notary, Manuel Azaña, and a professor of chemistry at the University of Salamanca, José Giral, were founders of the Republican Action Spain from the Pact of San Sebastián.

Infantry officers won quick promotions to general through the Morocco actions, and aristocratic cavalry officers also progressed fairly rapidly, but engineering and artillery officers did not flourish. Strong tensions emerged between the groups.

Minister of War Manuel Azaña closed access to the General Military Academy at Zaragoza on 30 June 1931. The director of the institution was an Africanist, General Francisco Franco. The ruling military was critical of that decision.

== Career in Francoist Spain ==
Jordana was appointed by Francisco Franco as foreign minister on the 30th of January 1938, a post he held until the 9th of August the next year. He remained influential in the regime, and he would later return to the foreign ministry in the wake of the Begoña Bombing in 1942, remaining foreign minister until his unexpected death on the 2nd of August 1944.

He was foreign minister during a critical period of the Second World War, steering Spanish foreign policy through Operation Torch and the Wolfram Crisis. Jordana, unlike his rival Serrano Suñer, worked towards "constructive neutrality" during the war, and as a result he was viewed unfavorably by the pro-German Falangists. After his passing, Jordana had a reputation of having "worked patiently to improve Spanish relations with a world at war."

== Honours ==
Awarded the National Order of the Legion of Honour, in the grade of Grand Cross.

== Sources ==
- B. H. Liddell Hart, The Other Side of the Hill. Germany's Generals. Their Rise and Fall, with their own Account of Military Events 1939–1945, London: Cassel, 1948; enlarged and revised edition, Delhi: Army Publishers, 1965. ISBN 978-81-8158-096-2.
- Milicia y Diplomacia: Diarios Del Conde de Jordana, 1936–1944 by Francisco Gómez-Jordana Souza, Carlos Seco Serrano, Rafael Gómez-Jordana Prats, ISBN 978-84-87528-45-3, 312 pages, Hardcover, Dossoles, Editorial, Burgos, (2002).
- ^ Beevor, Antony (2006). The Battle for Spain: the Spanish Civil War, 1936–1939. New York: Penguin Books, 144 pages. ISBN 0-14-303765-X.
- "Principales protagonistas de la Guerra Civil Española, 1936–39". Generalisimofranco.com.
- Javier Tusell, Genoveva G. Queipo de Llano, El enfrentamiento Serrano Súñer-Eugenio Espinosa de los Monteros: el ministro de Exteriores, los militares y la entrada en la guerra mundial, Historia 16, Nº 128, 1986, pags. 29–38. In Spanish.

Military offices
Preceded by Fidel Dávila Arrondo	Prime Minister of Francoist Spain (Technical Board of State); 1937–1938	Succeeded by Francisco Franco (Caudillo of Spain)
