= Sociedad Hispano-Marroquí de Transportes =

Carranza y Berndhart, S.L.
- Trade name: Sociedad Hispano-Marroquí de Transportes, S.L.
- Company type: Sociedad Limitada
- Industry: Logistics
- Founded: Tétouan, Spanish Morocco (July 31, 1936)
- Founder: Fernando Carranza; Johannes Bernhardt
- Defunct: 1945
- Headquarters: Tétouan, Spanish Morocco
- Total equity: 200,000 pts

Carranza y Berndhart, S.L., better known by its trading name Sociedad Hispano-Marroquí de Transportes (HISMA) ("Spanish-Moroccan Transport Company"), was a Spanish-German dummy company set up by the Nazi Party, through the German businessman Johannes Franz Bernhardt, to supply the National faction with arms during the course of the Spanish Civil War.

The company was constituted on 31 July 1936 in the city of Tétouan, capital of the Spanish protectorate of Morocco, with an initial investment of 200,000 pesetas.

== See also ==
- German involvement in the Spanish Civil War
- Condor Legion
