= Fidel Dávila Arrondo =

Spanish Army officer (1878–1962)

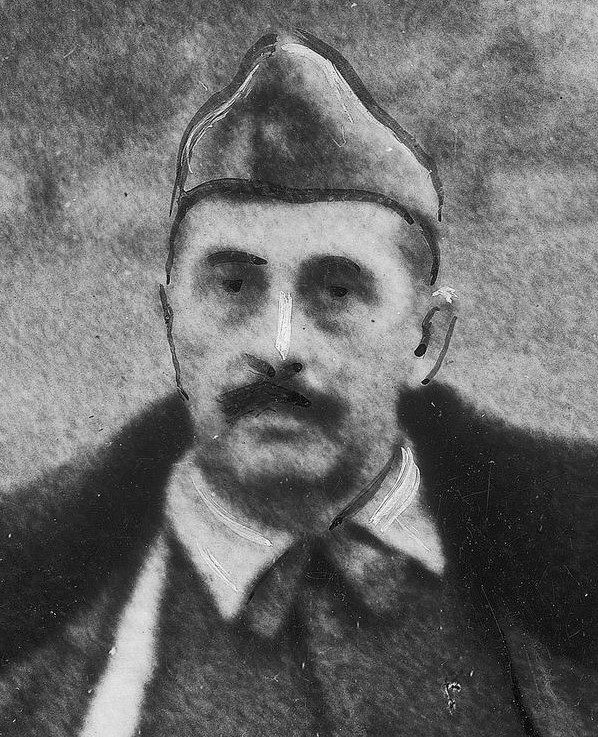

President of the Technical State Junta
- In office 3 October 1936 – 3 June 1937
- Caudillo: Francisco Franco
- Preceded by: Miguel Cabanellas
- Succeeded by: Francisco Gómez-Jordana

Minister of National Defense of Francoist Spain
- In office 31 January 1938 – 9 August 1939
- Caudillo: Francisco Franco
- Prime Minister: Francisco Franco
- Preceded by: Indalecio Prieto (as Minister of National Defense of the Spanish Republic)
- Succeeded by: Position abolished (spilt on Army, Navy and Air Force)

Minister of the Army of Spain
- In office 20 July 1945 – 19 July 1951
- Caudillo: Francisco Franco
- Prime Minister: Francisco Franco
- Preceded by: Carlos Asensio Cabanillas
- Succeeded by: Agustín Muñoz Grandes

Chief of Staff of the Army of Francoist Spain
- In office 2 October 1936 – 30 September 1939
- Caudillo: Francisco Franco
- Prime Minister: Francisco Franco
- Minister of National Defense: Himself
- Preceded by: Toribio Martínez Cabrera (as Chief of Staff of the Army of Spanish Republic)
- Succeeded by: Carlos Martínez de Campos y Serrano

Chief of the Defence High Command of Spain
- In office 5 May 1941 – 20 July 1945
- Generalísimo: Francisco Franco
- Prime Minister: Francisco Franco
- Preceded by: Francisco Martín-Moreno
- Succeeded by: Luis Orgaz Yoldi

Personal details
- Born: Fidel Dávila Arrondo Gil y Arija; 24 April 1878 Barcelona, Kingdom of Spain
- Died: 22 March 1962 (aged 83) Madrid, Francoist Spain (now Spain)
- Party: Falange
- Profession: Military

Fidel Dávila Arrondo, 1st Marquess of Dávila (24 April 1878 – 22 March 1962) was a Spanish Army officer during the Spanish Civil War.

Born in Barcelona, as an infantry officer, he fought in Cuba during the Spanish–American War and received the Cruz del Mérito Militar. He later entered the General Staff of the Army. He was then promoted to lieutenant colonel and assigned to Spanish Morocco. In 1929 he was promoted to brigadier general and was assigned to the VII Military district.

During the military reforms of Prime Minister Manuel Azaña, he solicited permission to go into the reserves and settled down in Burgos, from where he participated in the military conspiracy to overthrow the Popular Front government. On the night of the July 18–19, 1936 he seized the civil government of Burgos. He was a member of the Junta de Defensa Nacional and president of the Junta Técnica del Estado, the core of the future national government, as well as chief of staff of the Army. He participated in the War in the North resulting in the conquest of Biscay, Cantabria, and Asturias.

He was named minister of National Defense in the first government of Francisco Franco (February 1938), at the same time he was promoted to lieutenant general. He organized the Aragon Offensive campaign to isolate Catalonia and participated in the campaign of the Maestrazgo, the Battle of the Ebro and the Catalonia Offensive resulting in the final conquest of that region. In August 1939 he received the post of captain-general of the II Military district and the headquarters of the general staff. In July 1945 he was designated minister of the Army and in 1949 he was named head of the government. In 1951 he was part of the Council of the Kingdom and president of the Geographic Superior Council. He died in Madrid in 1962.

== Notes ==
Government offices
Preceded by Miguel Cabanellas	Prime Minister of Francoist Spain (Technical Board of State); 3 October 1936 – 3 June 1937	Succeeded by Francisco Gómez Jordana
Preceded by Carlos Asensio Cabanillas	Minister of the Army; 20 July 1945 – 19 July 1951	Succeeded by Agustín Muñoz Grandes
Military offices
Preceded by Toribio Martínez Cabrera; Disputed	Chief of Staff of the Army; Disputed; 2 October 1936 – 30 September 1939	Succeeded by Carlos Martínez de Campos y Serrano
Preceded by Francisco Martín-Moreno	Chief of the Defence High Command; 5 May 1941 – 20 July 1945	Succeeded by Luis Orgaz Yoldi
Spanish nobility
New creation	Marquess of Dávila; 1949–1962	Succeeded by Valentín Dávila
