= Ramón Serrano Suñer =

Spanish politician (1901–2003)

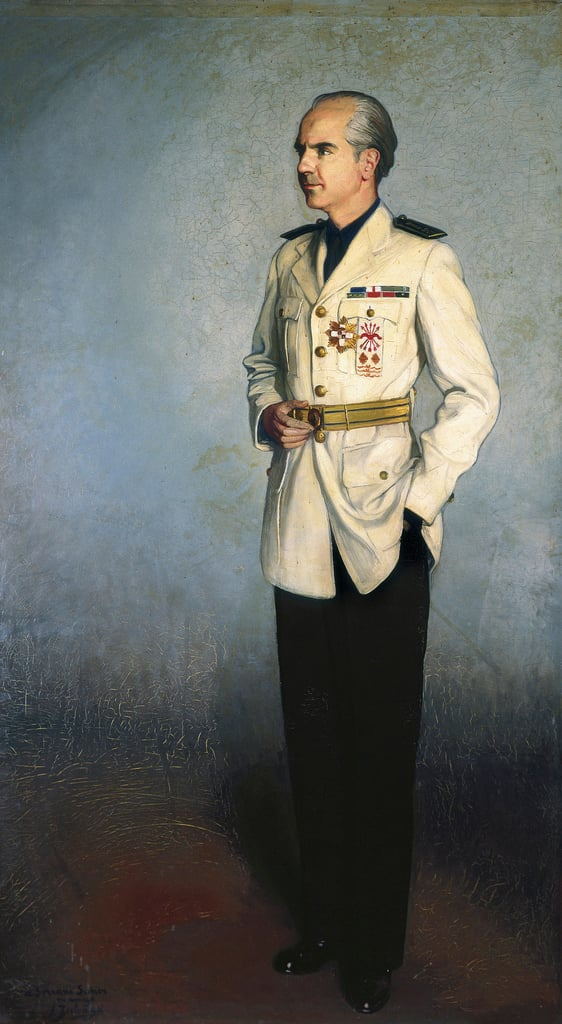
- Portrait by Ignacio Zuloaga

Minister of the Interior
- In office 30 January 1938 – 16 October 1940
- Succeeded by: Valentín Galarza Morante

Minister of Foreign Affairs
- In office 16 October 1940 – 3 September 1942
- Succeeded by: Francisco Gómez

Personal details
- Born: 12 September 1901 Cartagena, Spain
- Died: 1 September 2003 (aged 101) Madrid, Spain
- Party: FET y de las JONS
- Spouse: Ramona (Zita) Polo y Martínez-Valdés
- Relations: Francisco Franco (co-brother-in-law)
- Education: Universidad Central
- Nickname: Cuñadísimo

Ramón Serrano Suñer (12 September 1901 – 1 September 2003) was a Spanish politician during the first stages of Francoist Spain, between 1938 and 1942, when he held the posts of President of the FET y de las JONS caucus (1936), and then Interior Minister and Foreign Affairs Minister. A neofalangist originally from the CEDA, Serrano Suñer came to embody the most totalitarian impetus within the regime. Serrano Suñer was known for his pro-Nazi stance during World War II, when he and Franco unsuccessfully pushed for Spain to join the Axis powers and subsequently supported the sending of the Blue Division to fight along with the Wehrmacht on the Eastern Front. He was also the brother-in-law of Francisco Franco's wife Carmen Polo, for which he was informally nicknamed Cuñadísimo or the "most brother-in-law" (in comparison, the dictator himself was styled as generalísimo).

Serrano Suñer was the founder of the 67,000-strong Spanish blind people's organization ONCE on 13 December 1938, as well as of the EFE press-agency, in 1939. Serrano Suñer also founded the Radio Intercontinental radio network in 1950.

== Early life ==
He was born Ramón Serrano Suñer in Cartagena, the fifth of seven children born to an engineer working in the Valencian port of Castelló de la Plana. Although he was an excellent student, his father disapproved of his plans to become a lawyer. He enrolled at Madrid's Central University to study law, just the same. A fellow student of José Antonio Primo de Rivera (son of Spanish dictator Miguel Primo de Rivera and founder of the Falange), he developed a taste for falangism while spending a year in Bologna.

He joined the State Lawyers Corps in 1924.

Ramón Serrano Suñer and Francisco Franco were co-brothers-in-law, since the two married two sisters: Serrano Suñer married Ramona (Zita) Polo y Martínez-Valdés, in Oviedo on 6 February 1932, whom he had met shortly after moving to Zaragoza in 1931. Franco married Carmen Polo y Martínez-Valdés in October 1923. Ramón Serrano Suñer and Zita Polo had six children: Fernando, Francisco, Jaime Javier, José, María del Pilar and Ramón Serrano-Suñer y Polo.

Carmen Díez de Rivera e Icaza was Ramón Serrano Suñer's illegitimate daughter by the Marquis of Llanzol's wife but he never recognized her. Not knowing they were half-siblings, Carmen and Ramón Serrano Suñer y Polo fell in love and were only prevented from marrying at the last minute. She later became the Chief of Cabinet, ranking as Secretary of State, under Adolfo Suarez's right wing coalition and later as a socialist member of the European Parliament.

== Early political career ==
Suñer was a member of the Cortes Generales within the right-wing CEDA although he did not formally join the latter. Prior to the Spanish Civil War, he distanced himself from the CEDA and approached the Falange Española de las JONS but did not join it either. He had called the members of the youth wing Juventudes de Acción Popular to flee to the Falange in the spring of 1936. After the military coup of July 1936 and the outbreak of the civil war, he was locked in a Republican prison. He escaped in October 1936, dressed as a woman, and was then helped by the Argentine navy in getting to France, from where he was able to reach Salamanca on 20 February 1937, when Franco was in office at the time. It was there that he could work with Franco to participate for the rebels in the civil war.

In 1938, Serrano Suñer went to Nuremberg with Nicolás Franco, Franco's brother, probably to attend the 10th Nuremberg rally ("Rally of Greater Germany" or Reichsparteitag Großdeutschland) and celebrate the Anschluss.

Serrano Suñer served as Nationalist Minister of the Interior (1 February 1938 – 9 August 1939). When Franco amalgamated that ministry with the Ministry of Public Order ("Ministerio de Orden Público" in Spanish), a new name was created, the "Ministerio de la Gobernación", but the new name is now usually translated as "Ministry of the Interior". The merger was made by Franco on 9 August 1939, when Serrano Suñer became "Ministro de la Gobernación".

Suñer also managed to re-elaborate the statutes of the Falange Española Tradicionalista y de las JONS, decreasing the political power of the Secretary General in favour of a newly created office, the President of the Political Council, to which he was appointed on 9 August 1936. He left the office of Gobernación on 16 October 1940. Just the day before, 15 October 1940, the former president of the Generalitat of Catalonia, Lluis Companys, had been executed by firing squad in Barcelona. On 13 August, Companys had been handed over by the Gestapo authorities of occupied Paris to the Spanish policeman and spy Pedro Urraca Rendueles, along with the extradition of Basque Minister of the Interior Julián Zugazagoitia, who had served under Republican Prime Minister Juan Negrín.

While Serrano Suñer had been Minister of the Interior, the Minister of Foreign Affairs was General Juan Luis Beigbeder y Atienza, formerly a Military Attaché at the Spanish Embassy Berlin as an Army Commandant in 1926. Already as a colonel, he was the predecessor of Serrano Suñer as a Spanish Minister of Foreign Affairs.

In September 1940, the strongly pro-Axis Serrano Suñer visited Berlin to meet the German Foreign Minister Joachim von Ribbentrop to discuss how Spain might best enter the war on the Axis side. During the meeting, Serrano Suñer presented a "shopping list" to Ribbentrop, saying Spain wanted Gibraltar from the British and all of French Morocco "which belonged to Spain's Lebensraum"; and about Portugal, he said: "Geographically speaking, Portugal has no right to exist". Additionally, Serrano Suñer wanted generous promises of German military and economic support before Spain entered the war. Serrano Suñer and Ribbentrop did not get along and they soon developed an intense mutual hatred of one another. Although Ribbentrop told Serrano Suñer that Germany accepted military and economic aid and the return of Gibraltar and annexation of French Morocco, Ribbentrop told Suñer that Germany in return wanted to take at least one of the Canary Islands (Ribbentrop stated that he preferred Germany to have all of the Canaries but was prepared to be magnanimous by taking only one); that Germany be allowed air and naval bases in Spanish Morocco with extraterritorial rights; German companies to be given control of the mines in Spanish Morocco; and finally Ribbentrop wanted an economic treaty that would have turned Spain into an economic colony of Germany. For the pro-Axis Serrano Suñer, who had been expecting the Germans to treat Spain as an ally and an equal, to learn that the Germans viewed Spain as little more than a satellite state was a great shock. During his visits to Berlin, Serrano Suñer, who had started to rethink the wisdom of Spain entering the war, was overruled by Franco, who was keen to enter the war as soon as possible on the Axis side before Britain was defeated. Franco, in his letters to Serrano Suñer, praised Hitler as a wise statesman and dismissed Ribbentrop's demands as the product of a man who failed to appreciate properly what Spain had to offer the Axis.

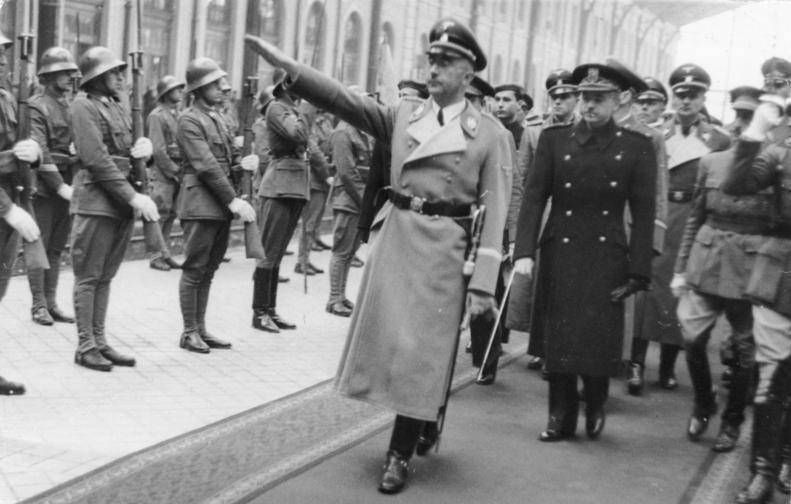
Heinrich Himmler at Madrid Northern Railway Station, October 1940, being honoured by Spanish soldiers. Ramón Serrano Suñer is in a dark uniform then worn by the Spanish Falange Party leaders.

Meanwhile, even on becoming Minister of Foreign Affairs, Serrano Suñer had to accept Jacobo Fitz-James Stuart, 17th Duke of Alba, as ambassador to London, who, since November 1937 represented the rebellious Franco and, from March 1939, represented Francisco Franco until March 1945. He had been formerly a Minister of Public Instruction, later Minister of State, 1930–1931, under the dictatorship of General Dámaso Berenguer.

In June 1939, Serrano Suñer had been back to Italy to present Benito Mussolini with the thousands of repatriated Italian soldiers who had fought by the side of Franco in Spain against the Republicans. He was appointed the 263rd Minister of Foreign Affairs (18 October 1940 – 3 September 1942) because of his skill at building a relationship with Mussolini.

Even though he was working with Franco, he objected to the increasing role of the Catholic Church in Falangist politics. The two brothers-in-law had some intraparty conflicts of their own, as Serrano Suñer accused Franco of riding on a "cult of personality", and Franco viewed Serrano Suñer as increasingly becoming a thorn in the side of his party who criticised too many of its policies.

== Involvement in World War II ==
Just one week after Serrano Suñer was promoted to Minister of Foreign Affairs, on 23 October 1940, Franco and Adolf Hitler met at the Hendaye railway station in France, near the Spanish border. There, Serrano Suñer met with Ribbentrop. Paul Schmidt, head interpreter of the German Chancellor, reported that Franco sat between Ribbentrop and Walther von Brauchitsch, while Adolf Hitler sat between the Spanish Foreign Affairs Minister Ramón Serrano Suñer and the Spanish Ambassador at Berlin, Eugenio Espinosa de los Monteros. However, neither the Spanish Ambassador at Berlin nor the German Ambassador at Madrid, Eberhard von Stohrer, were allowed at the exhaustive and inconclusive political meetings. By morning the meeting ended in failure. Serrano Suñer was later to say of the Hendaye summit that because of General Franco's obsession with Morocco, that if only Hitler had offered him French Morocco, then Spain would have entered the war in October 1940.

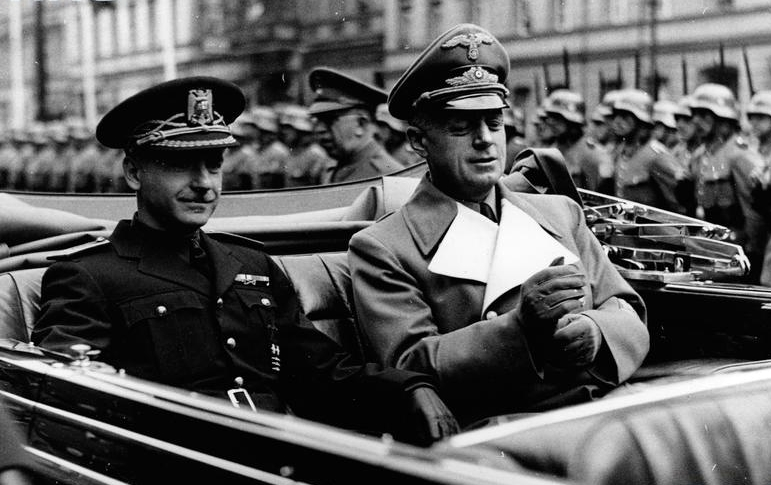
Serrano Suñer (left) and Joachim von Ribbentrop (right) in Berlin, 1940

Although Serrano Suñer had played a major role in establishing the Spanish State under Franco, being so influential as to be nicknamed the Cuñadísimo, which translates as supreme brother-in-law (a joke on "Generalísimo"), and despite Serrano Suñer's advocating Spain's joining the Axis powers, Franco opted for Spain to remain a nonbelligerent during World War II. Serrano Suñer's protégé, Pedro Gamero del Castillo, consulted in January 1941 with Hans Lazar, the press secretary of the German embassy, and told him that a Serrano Suñer government would commit to the Axis powers and thus asked for him to arrange for the Nazis to back his mentor publicly. However, it is unclear whether Gamero was working on his own initiative and Hitler was disappointed that Serrano Suñer had not tried harder to help Germany and called him the "gravedigger of the new Spain".

To make up for that failure, Serrano Suñer proposed the Blue Division of Spanish volunteers to fight with the Germans against the Soviet Union after Operation Barbarossa, which started on 22 June 1941. On 23 June, upon receiving the news, he met with Franco in El Pardo, and the Council of Ministers passed a resolution thereafter concerning the sending of a division of Spanish volunteers to the front. A day after, on 24 June, he declaimed his famous invective ¡Rusia es culpable! (transl. Russia is guilty!) rallying a revanchist mood during a speech delivered from the balcony of the FET-JONS headquarters.

On 25 November 1941 he signed in Berlin the revision of the pact of 25 November 1936 Germany–Japan Anti-Comintern Pact, an anticommunist pact concluded between Nazi Germany and the Empire of Japan (later to be joined by other countries) directed against the Communist International (Comintern) or Komintern.

In September 1942, following the Basilica of Begoña incident of August 1942, Serrano Suñer was forced to resign as foreign minister and president of the political council of the Falange Española Tradicionalista y de las JONS.

== Later life ==
After World War II, he wrote a persuasive letter to Franco, calling for a transitional government that would have room for intellectuals in exile. When Franco received the letter, he wrote a derisive "Ho-ho." in its margin. Serrano Suñer ultimately retired from public life in 1947.

In 1949, Serrano Suñer sponsored the visit to Spain of British Fascist leader Oswald Mosley, taking him to the tomb of José Antonio Primo de Rivera. In 1961, in the context of the Algiers putsch against French president Charles de Gaulle, Serrano Suñer was the main Spanish support to Raoul Salan during the latter's spell in Spain, and provided for Salan's transfer to Algeria so he could carry out the attempted generals' coup in April. Also by that time, Serrano operated too as a link between Salan and Portuguese dictator António de Oliveira Salazar, an enthusiastic supporter of Salan's putschist intentions.

Serrano Suñer died on 1 September 2003 in Madrid, eleven days before his 102nd birthday.

== Bibliography ==
- Ellwood, Sheelagh (1987). "Las fuentes orales y la historiografía del fascismo español" (PDF). Revista de Historia Jerónimo Zurita. 56: 65–79. ISSN 0044-5517.
- Gil Pecharromán, Julio (2013). El Movimiento Nacional (1937–1977). Barcelona: Grupo Planeta. ISBN 978-84-08-12138-1.
- Gil Pecharromán, Julio (2019). La estirpe del camaleón. Taurus. ISBN 978-84-306-2301-3.
- Lowe, Sid (2010). Catholicism, War and the Foundation of Francoism: The Juventud de Acción Popular in Spain, 1931–1939. Sussex Academic Press. ISBN 978-1-84519-373-7.
- Marquina Barrio, Antonio (1989). "La Etapa de Ramón Serrano Súñer en el Ministerio de Asuntos Exteriores" (PDF). Espacio, Tiempo y Forma, Serie V, Historia Contemporánea (2). Universidad Nacional de Educación a Distancia: 145–167.
- Redondo, Gonzalo (1993). Historia de la Iglesia en España, 1931–1939: La Guerra Civil, 1936-1939. Ediciones Rialp. ISBN 84-321-3016-8.
