= Eberhard von Stohrer =

German diplomat

Eberhard von Stohrer (5 February, 1883 – 7 March 1953) was a career German diplomat who served during World War I and World War II. The son of an Army General from Württemberg, he studied at Leipzig University, receiving a Doctor of Law degree. He also studied at the University of Strasbourg and the School of Political Sciences in Paris.

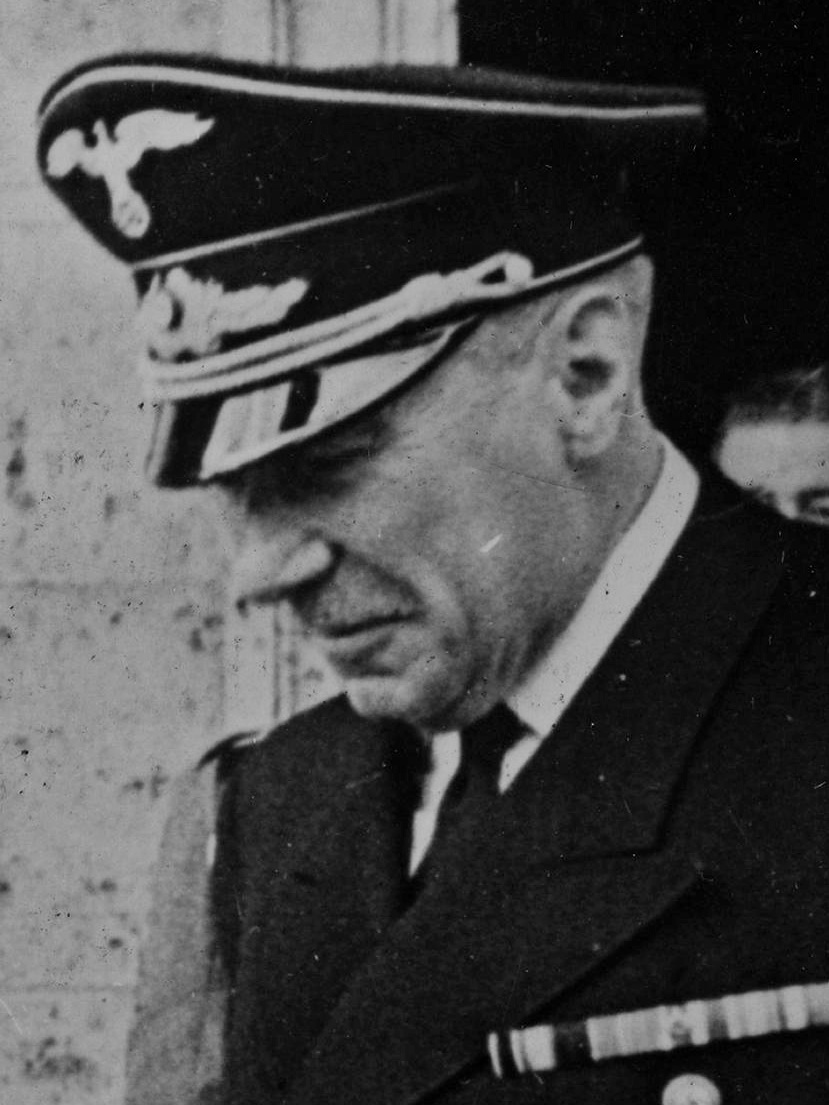
Eberhard von Stohrer, was a German diplomat.

== Beginnings as a diplomat ==
In 1909, he joined the German diplomatic corps, becoming attaché of the embassy in Sofia, Bulgaria. In 1910, he was transferred to London, and in 1912 to Brussels. After a short period of time in Berlin with the central office of the Imperial Ministry of Foreign Affairs, he moved to Madrid, where he learned to speak fluent Spanish and organized an intelligence network closely associated, apparently, to German Ambassador Leopold von Hoesch. In 1925, he married Maria Ursula von Stohrer, née von Gunther. She was the daughter of cavalry officer Franz von Günther and Ilse von Koch, born in Wannsee, Berlin, who spent her childhood between Berlin and the countryside.

After World War I, he moved to Berlin, and rose through the ranks of the diplomatic corps. In 1927, he was named Germany's envoy to Egypt, and he negotiated a treaty of friendship between Germany and the Kingdom of Hijaz in 1929. He was an avid automobile racer and became lost during an April 1936 race between Cairo and the Bahariya Oasis.

== Diplomatic missions in Spain ==
During the Spanish Civil War from July 1936 to April 1939, he stayed in Madrid, acting as an observer and spy of the Second Spanish Republic and reporting news to the Nazi government in Berlin. Artillery General Wilhelm Faupel was the Nazi envoy to General Francisco Franco's Salamanca headquarters from February to October 1937. There is evidence however that von Stohrer presented his credentials as Ambassador of Germany at Salamanca on 27 August 1937 as ordered from Berlin.

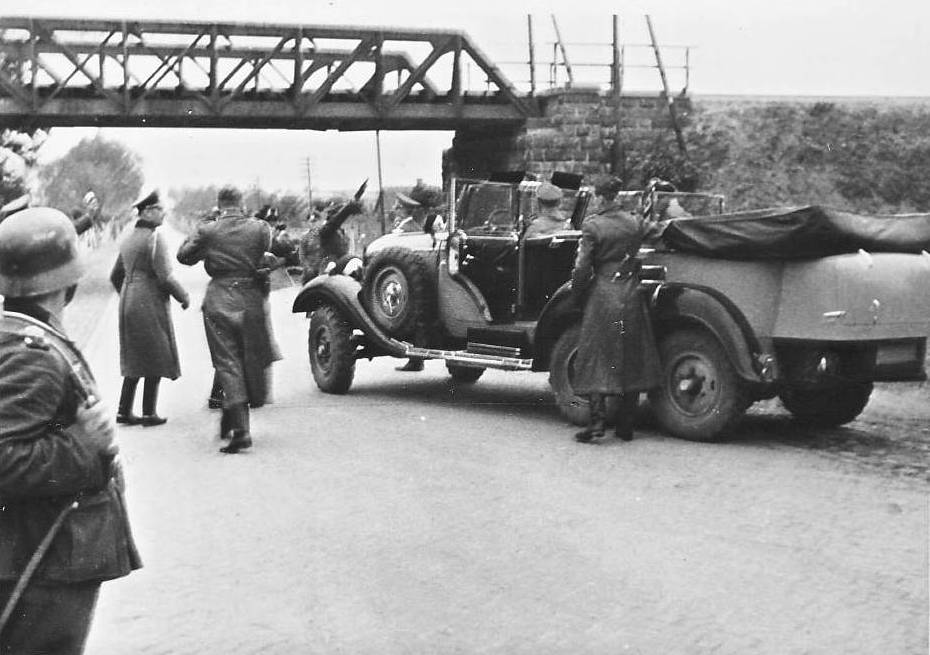
Vehicle Mercedes-Benz w31 540. The only one existing today out of four manufactured world wide after 1938 was given by German Ambassador to Spain Eberhard von Stohrer to Spanish General Franco – the other three were used by Adolf Hitler, Joseph Goebbels and Benito Mussolini. It was restored during 2001–2005 by the German firm Mercedes-Benz Cars on behalf of its actual proprietor, the Spanish State National Patrimony

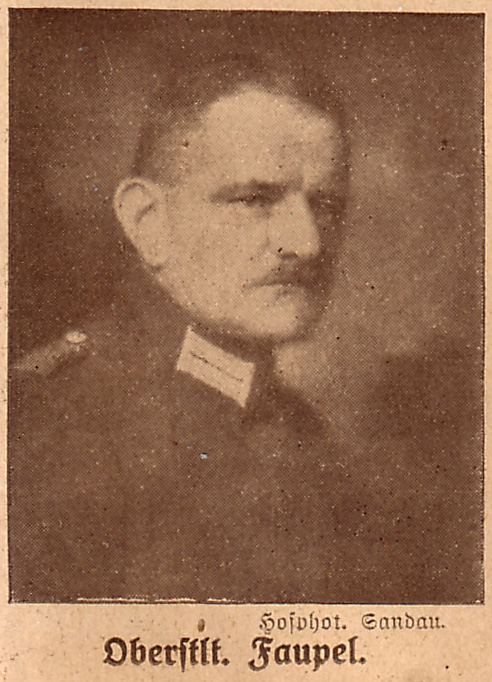
A 1916 photograph of the then Lieutenant Colonel of the German Artillery Wilhelm Faupel

He was then appointed German ambassador to Romania, where he served until 1939, when he returned to Berlin. He participated in Operation Willi, the German plot to kidnap the Duke of Windsor. He participated in the role during negotiations between the two countries, earlier than 8 July 1940, about Operation Felix, the proposed German seizure of Gibraltar.

He was replaced with Hans-Adolf von Moltke in January 1943 and worked in Berlin until the end of the war. He died on 7 March 1953 in Konstanz.

== Franco-Hitler meeting at Hendaye ==
He was one of the organizers of the Meeting at Hendaye on the Spanish-French border, 23 October 1940, of Adolf Hitler and Joachim von Ribbentrop, with General Francisco Franco and Franco's brother in law Ramón Serrano Suñer).

He was not present in the personal encounter between Hitler and Franco.

== Connections with the Grand Mufti of Jerusalem ==
Panarabist German connections with Near East politicians were specially cultivated by von Stohrer in the 1920s and 1930s.
