= Javier Tusell =

Spanish historian

Javier Tusell Gómez (26 August 1945, Barcelona - 8 February 2005, Barcelona) was a Spanish historian, writer and politician who served as a professor of modern history at the National University of Distance Education (UNED).

== Biography ==
His family moved to Madrid while he was still very young, and he obtained his degree in history and political science at Complutense University, where he studied with José María Jover. While there, he was a member of the "Union of Democratic Students" and the "Union of Young Christian Democrats"; groups which opposed the Francoist "Union of University Students".

He has been a teacher since receiving his doctorate in 1966; beginning as an assistant professor at his alma mater. In 1975, over some opposition, he was named an aggregate professor of modern history at the Autonomous University of Barcelona. Two years later, he obtained a professorship at the University of Valencia. In 1981, he became a professor at UNED; a position he held, with a brief interregnum, for the rest of his life.

Attracted to politics, he joined the new Democratic People's Federation, led by José María Gil-Robles, in 1975. After the party's dissolution in 1977, he switched to the Christian Democratic Party (UCD). In the first Post-Franco municipal elections (1979), he was elected a councilor (alderman) in Madrid on the UCD ticket. From then until 1982, he was also director general of the "Patrimonio Artístico, Archivos y Museos" at the Ministry of Culture.

At this time, he oversaw negotiations between the family of Pablo Picasso and the Museum of Modern Art to return Picasso's iconic painting, Guernica, to Spain. Its installation at the Museo Nacional Centro de Arte Reina Sofía would become a major symbol of the restoration of democracy. Despite this success, Tusell was dismissed by the Minister of Culture, Soledad Becerril, ostensibly over disagreements involving libraries and restoration procedures, but possibly because she felt that he had overstepped his authority. The dismissal, delivered by telephone, was protested by Joan Miró, Pablo Serrano, Antoni Tàpies and Eduardo Chillida.

After briefly being a member of the People's Democratic Party, he left politics and returned to his professorship duties at UNED. In 1999, the Council of Ministers appointed him as their representative to the "Fundación Colección Thyssen-Bornemisza".

Apart from his activities as a teacher and writer, he was also a major contributor to periodicals such as El Mundo, El País, La Vanguardia and the now defunct Diario 16, as well as to the radio network SER.

At the beginning of 2002, he was diagnosed with leukemia, which led to his death three years later. He was married to the historian, Genoveva García Queipo de Llano (born 1945) and had two children.

== Selected writings ==
=== English ===
- Spain: From Dictatorship to Democracy (translated by Rosemary Clark), John Wiley & Sons, 2011 ISBN 978-1-4443-4272-7

=== Spanish ===
- Franco y los católicos: la política interior española entre 1945 y 1957, Alianza, 1984 ISBN 978-84-206-2413-6
- Franco y Mussolini. La política española durante la segunda guerra mundial (co-authored with his wife), Peninsula, 2006 ISBN 978-84-83077-24-5
- La dictadura de Franco, Alianza, 1989 ISBN 978-84-206-0310-0
- Carrero. La eminencia gris del régimen de Franco, Temas de Hoy, 1993 ISBN 978-84-7880-347-7
- Juan Carlos I. La restauración de la monarquía, Temas de Hoy, 1995 ISBN 978-84-7880-589-1
- Alfonso XIII. El rey polémico, (co-authored with his wife), Penguin-Random House Español, 2012 ISBN 978-84-306-0879-9
- Tiempo de incertidumbre: Carlos Arias Navarro entre el franquismo y la transición (1973-1976), Critica, 2003 ISBN 978-84-8432-476-8
- El aznarato: el gobierno del Partido Popular 1996–2003, Penguin-Random House Español, 2012 ISBN 978-84-03-01269-1
