= Nationalist zone (Spanish Civil War) =

Area controlled by the Nationalist faction during the Spanish Civil War (1936–1939)

Spanish State
- 1936–1939
- Flag (1936–1938) Coat of arms (1936–1939)
- Motto: One, Great and Free
- Anthem: Marcha Real; Triple Anthem (informal)
- Spain in October 1937. Nationalist zone. Republican zone.
- Status: Nationalist faction-led quasi state
- Capital: Burgos (administrative); Salamanca (de facto)
- Common languages: Spanish
- Religion: Catholic
- Membership: Anti-Comintern Pact
- Government: Provisional government under a military junta (25 July – 30 September 1936)
- President of the Technical State Junta
  - 1936: Miguel Cabanellas
  - 1936–1937: Fidel Dávila Arrondo
  - 1937–1938: Francisco Gómez-Jordana y Sousa
  - 1938–1939 (Note: From 1938, Franco also assumed the role of head of government as President of the Council of Ministers.): Francisco Franco
- Head of State
  - 1936 (Note: From 25 July to 30 September 1936, Cabanellas collectively assumed "all the Powers of the State" as president of the National Defence Junta.): Miguel Cabanellas
  - 1936–1939: Francisco Franco
- Historical era: Spanish Civil War
  - Coup d'état: 17 July 1936
  - National Defense Junta established: 24 July 1936
  - State Technical Junta established: 2 October 1936
  - Decree of Unification: 19 April 1937
  - First Franco government: 31 January 1938
  - Final offensive: 1 April 1939
Preceded by	Succeeded by
Second Spanish Republic	Francoist Spain

The Nationalist zone, also known as the Francoist zone, is the term used in contemporary historiography to refer to the area of Spain controlled by the Nationalists during the Spanish Civil War. The Nationalists themselves referred to it as the National zone.

From 1936, it was recognized as the legitimate representative of the Spanish State by supporting European countries, such as Nazi Germany and Fascist Italy—in communications with its government, the German ambassador also used the term White Spain to refer to the Nationalist zone. In February 1939, near the war's end, it was also recognized by the governments of France and the United Kingdom.

The extent of the Nationalist zone varied throughout the war as fronts shifted. Its existence ended when General Francisco Franco's forces gained complete control of the country, initiating the Francoist dictatorship.

== Concept and terminology ==
"National zone" or "Nationalist zone" are traditional terms used by Francoist historiography, though much of contemporary historiography rejects the term "national" in favor of terms like "Nationalists," "rebels," or "Francoists." Thus, terms such as "Francoist zone" (Note: The term Francoist is considered the most appropriate by various authors from 1937 onward, following Franco's assumption of absolute leadership after Mola's death.) or "Nationalist zone" are now commonly used. Other authors, such as Hugh Thomas, refer to it as "Nationalist Spain," or Ramón Tamames as "National Spain."

The term "Nationalists" or "nationals" for the faction in the civil war was coined by Joseph Goebbels, the German propaganda minister, following a visit by a clandestine Spanish delegation led by Captain Francisco Arranz to request military aid from Nazi Germany after the Coup in Spain on 24 July 1936. The term aimed to lend legitimacy to German military aid to the Spanish rebel military. (Note: In July 1936, Nazi Propaganda Minister Joseph Goebbels instructed the German press on how to report the Spanish Civil War. They were not to refer to Franco's troops as "rebels," nor describe the insurgent military movement as a "coup" or "rebellion." Republicans were to be called "Bolsheviks." German participation in the war was not to be mentioned.) The Nationalist leaders, labeled "crusaders" by the Bishop of Salamanca Enrique Pla y Deniel (who used the term "crusade" for their campaign), immediately endorsed and adopted the term.

== Political evolution ==
Following the provisional phase represented by the National Defense Junta formed after the death of General Sanjurjo in an aviation accident, who was to lead the military directorate to govern the country after overthrowing the Popular Front government, the rebel generals and leaders decided to appoint a single military and political leader. From 1 October 1936, General Franco became the "Generalissimo" of the rebel forces and the "Head of the Government of the State." After the failure to capture Madrid (between November 1936 and March 1937) and with the prospect of a prolonged war, the "Generalissimo" Franco, with the help of his brother-in-law Ramón Serrano Suñer, began shaping the political organization of the "New State." The first step was the Decree of Unification in April 1937, merging all political forces supporting the "national uprising," particularly the Falangists and Carlists, who had contributed significantly with their militias, into a single party called Falange Española Tradicionalista y de las JONS. The next step was organizing the "New State," a task assigned by the "Generalissimo" to his first government, appointed on 30 January 1938, replacing the Junta Técnica del Estado.

The construction of the "New State" was accompanied by the destruction of everything related to the Republic. In the rebel zone, unlike the Republican zone where the revolution had unfolded, a "counter-revolution" was carried out, involving "systematic repression of individuals, organizations, and institutions that, in any way, real or even imagined, could be linked to that revolutionary Republic, or in the hands of revolutionaries, which they claimed to combat."

"In this path [of building the 'New State' and eliminating everything related to the Republic], Franco had the support and blessing of the Catholic Church. Bishops, priests, and religious figures began treating Franco as a divine envoy to restore order in the earthly city, and Franco came to believe he indeed had a special relationship with divine providence."

=== National defense junta ===
The death of General Sanjurjo, exiled in Estoril, on 20 July due to an accident shortly after the takeoff of the plane piloted by Falangist Juan Antonio Ansaldo, which was to take him from Lisbon to Pamplona to lead the uprising, left the rebel generals without their intended leader. To partially address the lack of a single leader, four days after Sanjurjo's accident, on 24 July, the rebel generals and leaders formed the National Defense Junta in Burgos, chaired by the highest-ranking and most senior general, Miguel Cabanellas, head of the Zaragoza Organic Division, and including General Saliquet, General Mola, General Dávila, Colonel Montaner, and Colonel Moreno Calderón (with General Franco joining later). Its Decree No. 1 stated that it assumed "all the powers of the State" and, through subsequent decrees, extended the state of war declared by the rebels in each location to all of Spain (serving as the basis for subjecting opponents to summary court-martials), outlawed Popular Front parties and unions, and banned all workers' and employers' political and union activities "while the current circumstances persist" (Decree of 25 September).

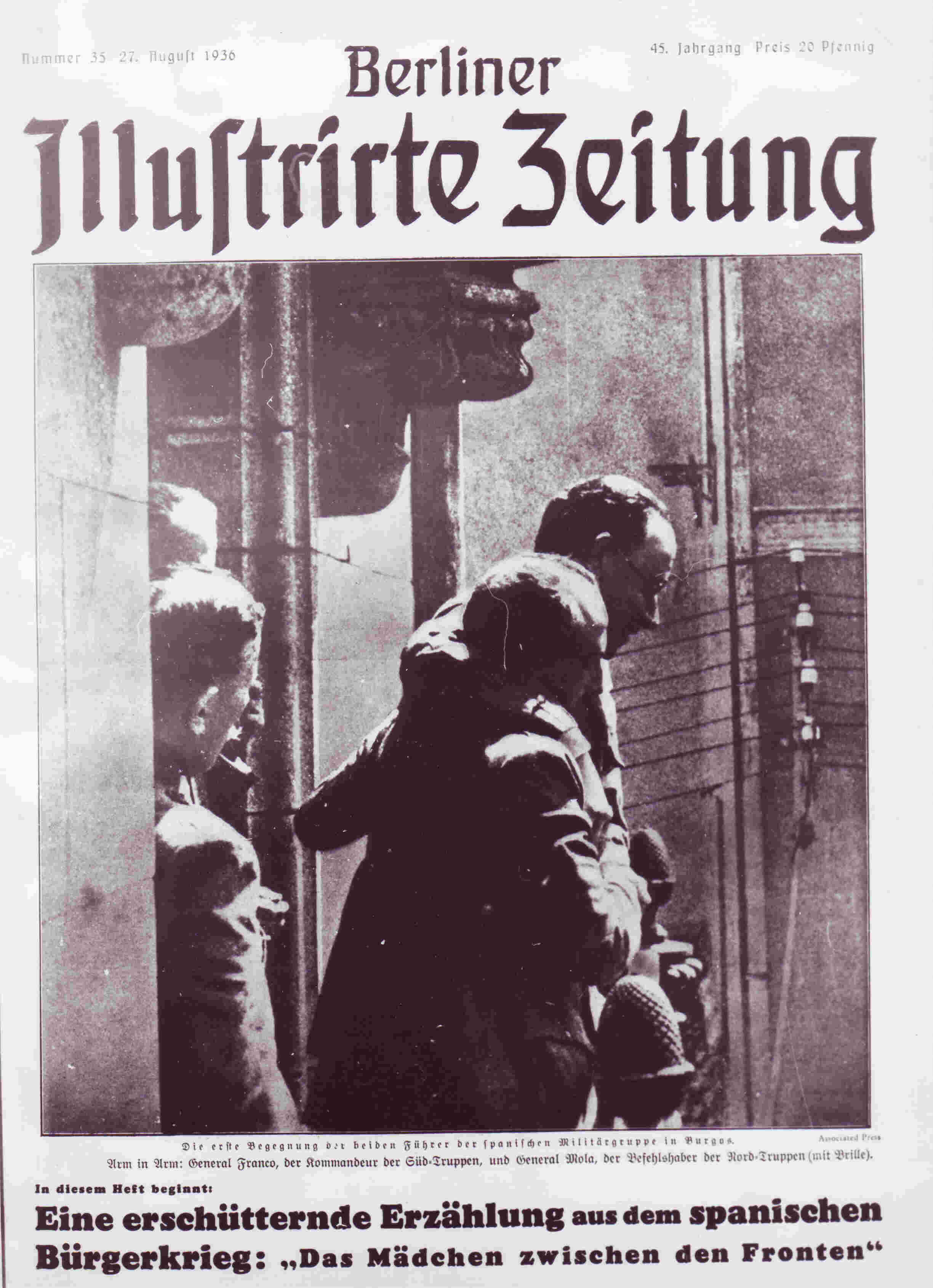
Mola alongside General Franco in an appearance in Burgos on 27 August 1936, as reported by the German newspaper Berliner Illustrirte Zeitung. Mola is on the right.

The most urgent task was achieving military command unity. "With the failure of the swift military coup, Mola’s envisioned establishment of a Directory fell apart, especially with the death of the person who could have led it undisputedly [General Sanjurjo]. This raised the question of a possible monarchical restoration, which the military conspirators had not planned. (...) But any action inevitably required first choosing a single leader." It appears that General Franco (who had established his headquarters on 26 August at the Palacio de los Golfines in Cáceres, where Falangists organized a mass rally acclaiming him as leader and savior of Spain) requested a meeting of the rebel generals to address this issue. According to other historians, the proposal came from General Alfredo Kindelán.

=== General franco, "generalissimo" and "caudillo" ===
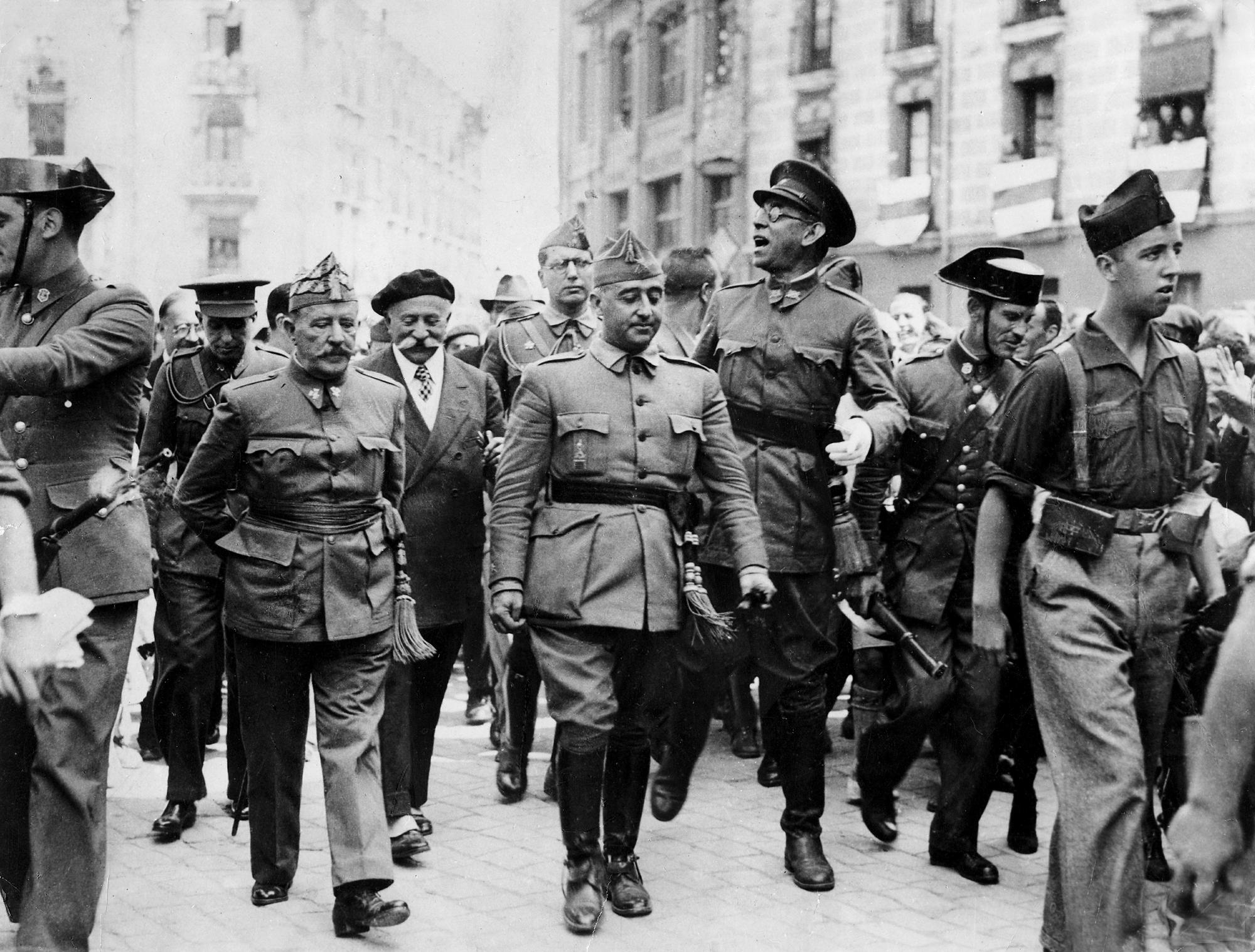
General Franco in Burgos in August 1936. To his left is General Mola, and to his right is General José Cavalcanti.

On 21 September, a meeting took place at a farm near Salamanca attended by the generals of the National Defense Junta, along with Generals Orgaz, Gil Yuste, and Kindelán. They discussed the need for a single command of the rebel forces and appointed General Franco for the role, as he led the army poised to enter Madrid (the Army of Africa was about to capture Maqueda, just 100 kilometers from the capital) and had secured aid from Nazi Germany and Fascist Italy. Other potential candidates were ruled out (Cabanellas for being a Mason; Queipo de Llano for being a republican; Mola for the failure of his columns’ advance on Madrid). Additionally, Franco was "the most cautious, least ideologized, and most neutral in terms of regime," according to historian Santos Juliá. However, while military command was settled, political leadership remained unresolved. All generals voted for Franco except Miguel Cabanellas, who abstained and later remarked:

You do not know what you have done, because you do not know [General Franco] as I do, having had him under my command in the Army of Africa as the head of one of the units in my column; and if, as you wish, Spain is handed to him at this moment, he will believe it is his and will not let anyone replace him during the war or after it, until his death.

Franco then made a "masterstroke": ordering the columns advancing on Madrid to divert to Toledo to relieve the Alcázar, lifting the two-month siege of around a thousand civil guards, Falangists, and infantry academy cadets under Colonel Moscardó, who held "women and children of known leftist militants as hostages." "With their liberation, Franco gained immense political capital: the Alcázar was the symbol of Spain’s salvation, resurrecting like a martyr from the tomb to which its enemies had consigned it." "The capture of the Alcázar amplified Franco's legend. Moscardó’s famous phrase no news at the Alcázar, repeated before Franco and numerous journalists two days after its liberation, was widely propagated. Franco was the savior of the besieged heroes, the symbol of an army determined to win the war at any cost."

On 28 September 1936, the day the Alcázar de Toledo was relieved, a second meeting of the generals in Salamanca decided the political leadership. Franco was chosen, named not only "Generalissimo of the national land, sea, and air forces" but also "Head of the Government of the Spanish State, while the war lasts." Franco accepted both appointments, stating: "You place Spain in my hands... I must take on all powers." However, when Decree No. 138 of the Junta de Defensa Nacional was published the next day, a significant change was made: the phrase "while the war lasts" was removed, and Franco’s appointment as "Head of the Government of the Spanish State" included "who will assume all powers of the new State." By using "Spanish State," the issue of the future regime after capturing Madrid and ending the war (expected in weeks or months) was sidestepped, but the republican apparatus was dismantled, and power passed dictatorially to Franco. The decree of 29 September 1936, became the basis of the "Generalissimo’s" legitimacy for the next 39 years.

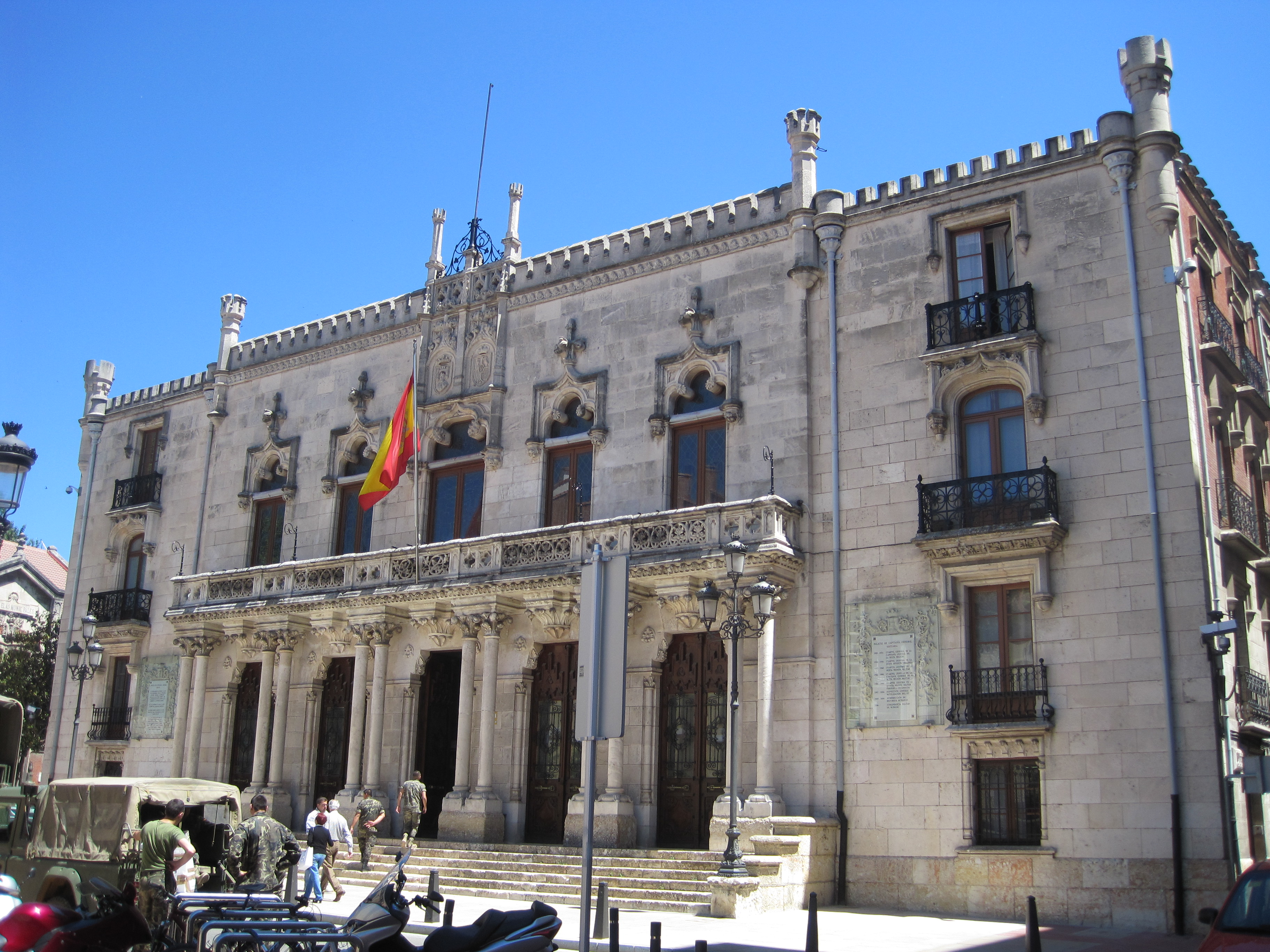
Facade of the General Captaincy Palace (Burgos).

On 1 October 1936, in the throne room of the General Captaincy of Burgos, Francisco Franco took office as Generalissimo of the rebel army and Head of the Government of the State. This confirmed the administrative and military unity of the rebels,

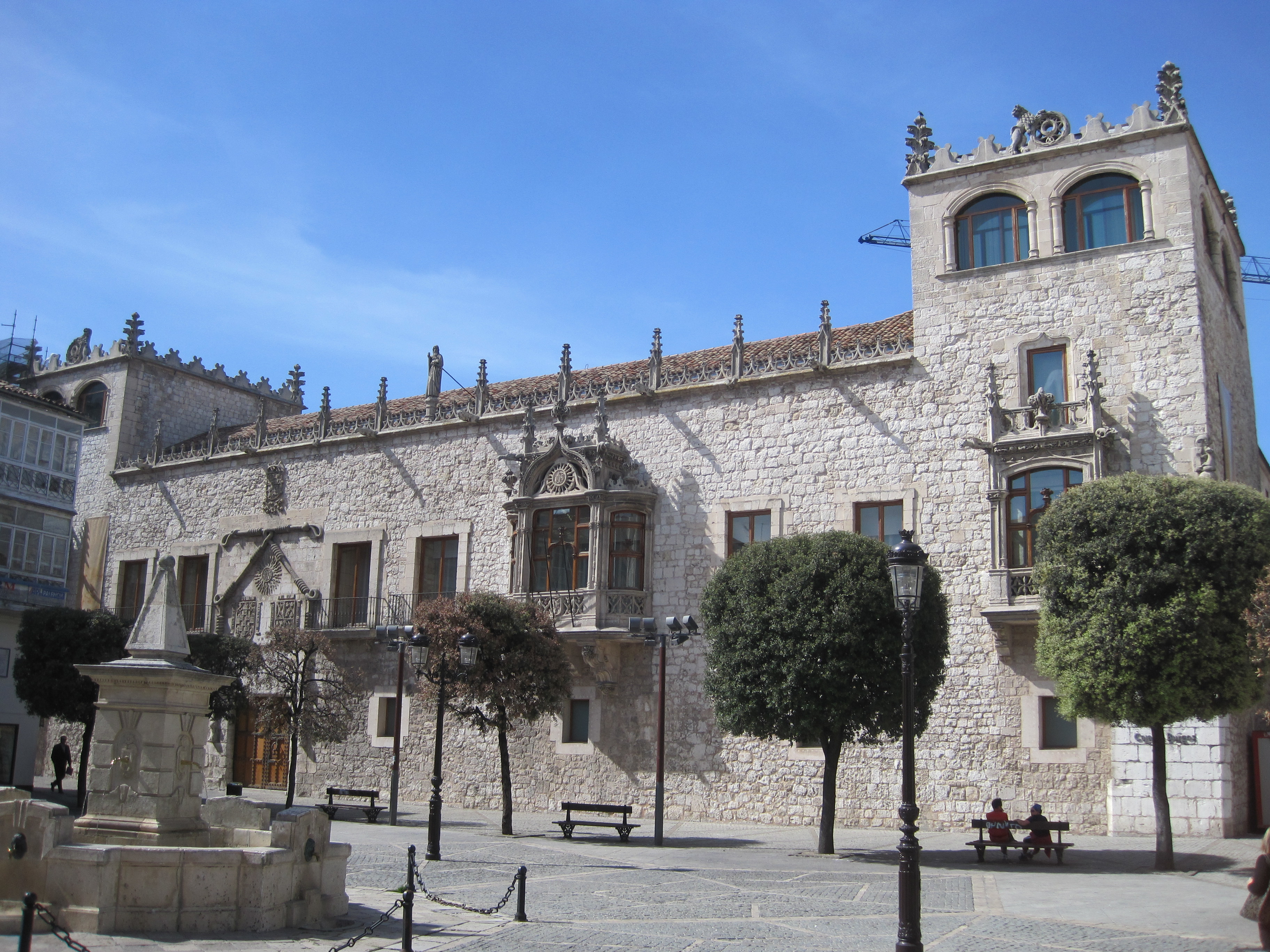
Casa del Cordón, in Burgos, headquarters of the Junta Técnica del Estado.

The day before, the Bishop of Salamanca Enrique Pla y Deniel published a pastoral letter titled "The Two Cities", presenting the war as "a crusade for religion, homeland, and civilization," providing new religious legitimacy to the rebel cause. Thus, the "Generalissimo" was not only the "leader and savior of the Homeland" but also the "Caudillo" of a new "Crusade" defending the Catholic faith and the pre-Second Republic social order. Cardinal Primate Isidro Gomá sent Franco a congratulatory telegram for his appointment as "Head of the Government of the Spanish State," and the "Generalissimo" replied, stating that "he could not receive better aid than Your Eminence’s blessing" and asking for prayers to "enlighten and give me strength for the arduous task of creating a new Spain, whose happy outcome is already guaranteed by the patriotic collaboration so kindly offered by Your Eminence, whose pastoral ring I kiss." Bishop Pla y Deniel lent Franco his episcopal palace in Salamanca for use as his General Headquarters.

The first law promulgated by the "Generalissimo" Franco created the Junta Técnica del Estado (replacing the National Defense Junta), chaired by General Dávila (replaced in summer 1937 by the more efficient monarchist General Francisco Gómez-Jordana). It included a General Secretariat of the Head of State, led by Franco's elder brother Nicolás Franco. This administrative body, with seven Commissions acting as traditional Ministries, continued the social restructuring begun by the Junta de Defensa Nacional, addressing issues "from the counter-agrarian reform, returning estates to their former owners, to the purge of disloyal officials... The clear intention was to reverse all republican legislation, restoring things to their prior state."

The headquarters of the Junta Técnica del Estado was established in Burgos, making it the administrative capital of the new regime (though some departments were in other Castilian cities), but the political capital of "National Spain" was Salamanca, where military power resided, as it housed the General Headquarters of the "Generalissimo" Franco. Salamanca became the power center of rebel Spain as it also hosted German and Italian diplomatic representations and some Junta Técnica del Estado departments.

=== Decree of unification of April 1937 ===
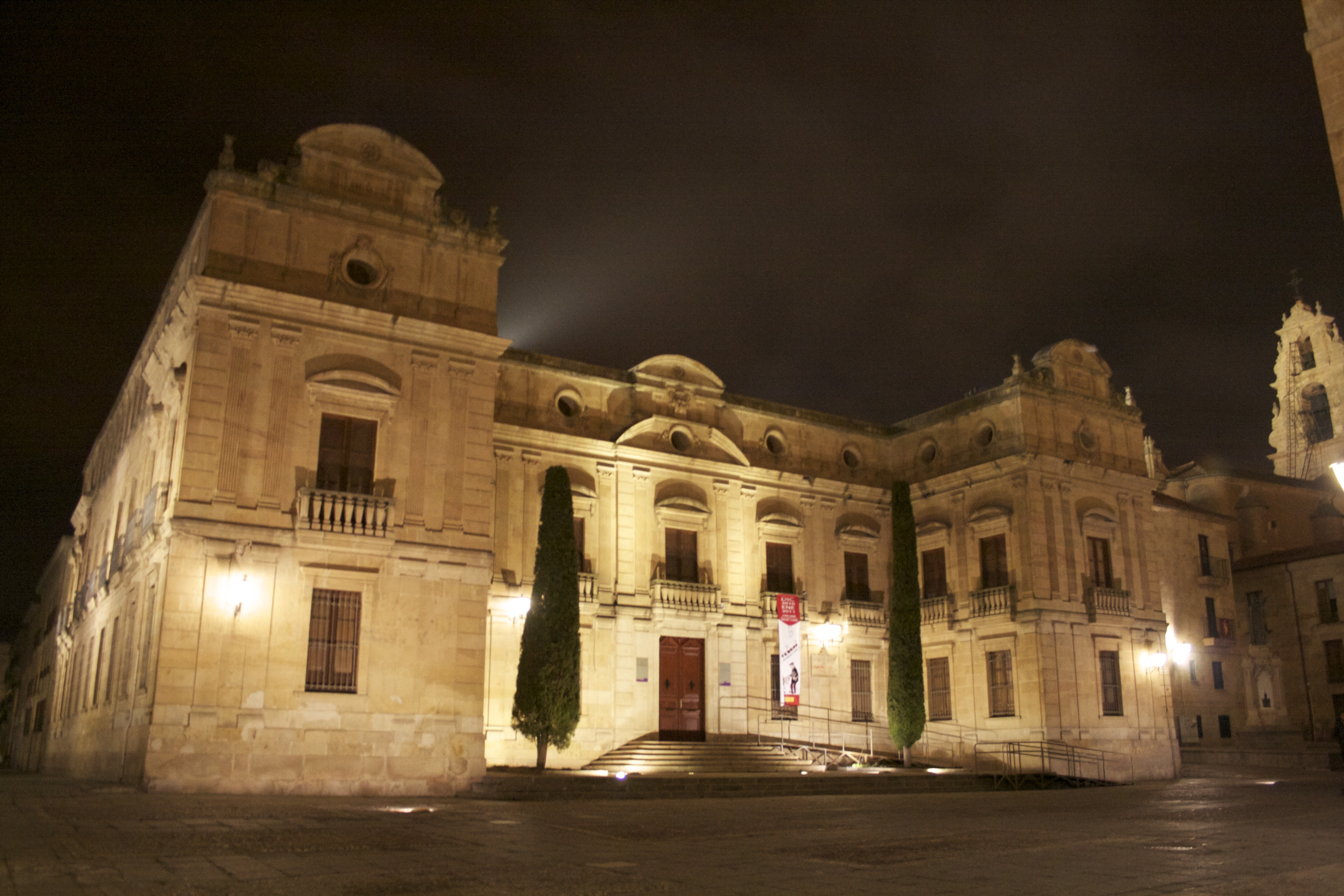
Episcopal Palace of Salamanca, headquarters of the "Generalissimo" Franco's General Headquarters from his proclamation as Head of State on 1 October 1936, until the end of the civil war

The next step in consolidating the new "Caudillo’s" power came after the failure to capture Madrid (November 1936 – March 1937), necessitating a "single party" modeled on the Primo de Rivera dictatorship, merging Carlists and Falangists. Both groups had their own visions for the new State being built in the rebel zone. In the "absence" of José Antonio Primo de Rivera, imprisoned in Madrid's Modelo Prison from 14 March 1936, and later transferred to Alicante's prison on 5 June 1936, a Provisional Command Junta was formed in Valladolid led by Manuel Hedilla, "a politician of limited stature—perhaps chosen for that reason—" who lacked Primo de Rivera's prestige and soon strained relations with Franco's power circle. "The news of José Antonio’s death [executed in Alicante on November 20, 1936], reported by Republican and foreign press, was concealed in rebel Spain. Franco used the cult of the Absent to leave the party leadership vacant and manipulate Falange as a mechanism for mobilizing the civilian population."

Carlist flag with the Cross of Burgundy.

As for the Traditionalist Communion Carlist leader Manuel Fal Conde tried to maintain his organization's and Requetés militias’ independence, but his significant move in December 1936 (attempting to create a Royal Military Academy of Requetés, separate from military academies and thus outside the Army's structure) prompted a swift response from the "Generalissimo" Franco: face a court-martial for "treason" or leave Spain. Fal Conde chose exile in Portugal. On 20 December 1936, Franco decreed the militarization of Carlist and Falangist militias.

From the General Headquarters of the Generalissimo, Franco's new advisor Ramón Serrano Suñer (his brother-in-law and former CEDA deputy who had escaped the "red zone" to Salamanca) facilitated a rapprochement between the Traditionalist Communion and Falange Española y de las JONS for their merger, but their ideological and political differences (separating traditionalism from fascism) were nearly insurmountable, and another non-negotiable obstacle was that the "single party" would be led by Franco himself. Both sides had to accept that the new political formation would be subordinate to the "Generalissimo’s" personal power. To promote this, the slogan "One Homeland, One State, One Caudillo" was spread from Salamanca's Headquarters, copying the Nazi slogan "Ein Volk, ein Reich, ein Führer" (‘one people, one state, one leader’).

Contacts between Falangists and Carlists occurred but failed, creating tensions within both parties, resulting in the Falangist "Salamanca events" of April 1937, where several Falangists died in clashes between merger supporters (led by Sancho Dávila and Agustín Aznar) and opponents (led by Manuel Hedilla).

Franco's Headquarters acted decisively, and on the day Falangist opponents held a National Council electing Manuel Hedilla as "national leader," Sunday, 18 April, Franco announced the Decree of Unification for the next day, merging Falange and the Traditionalist Communion under his direct leadership as "national leader." Franco not only failed to inform Hedilla but had him arrested a week later (along with other dissenting Falangists) when he refused to join the new party's Political Junta as a mere member and instructed his provincial leaders to follow only his orders. Franco kept Fal Conde and other Carlists away from the power center. (Note: Hedilla was accused of conspiring to assassinate Franco, earning a death sentence (later commuted to a long prison term). Fal Conde faced a similar fate, also sentenced to death despite being exiled in Portugal.) Most senior military figures, including Mola and Queipo de Llano, accepted this with varying reluctance, while most political organization members (including prominent Carlist leader Count of Rodezno) also accepted and served the new leader.

Flag of Falange Española y de las JONS.

The decree creating the single party Falange Española Tradicionalista y de las JONS was announced with a speech by the "Generalissimo" Franco from the balcony of the General Headquarters (the Episcopal Palace lent by Bishop Enrique Pla y Deniel) on the night of 19 April. The decree included a long preamble and three articles, creating "a fascist-style single Party, called a movement, placing Franco at its head, and conceiving it as the State’s support, intermediary between society and a State designated as the New Totalitarian State."

"To leave no doubt about the location of power in what was beginning to be called the New State, the national leader of Falange, Manuel Hedilla—along with other comrades reluctant to join the new party’s Political Junta—was tried and sentenced to death for his manifest act of indiscipline and subversion against the sole and indisputable Command and Power of National Spain. It had to be clear to all that military unity of command would, in the future, be political unity of command." Following advice from the "Absent’s" sister Pilar Primo de Rivera (leader of Falange's "pure" sector), Serrano Suñer, and German ambassador Von Faupel, Franco pardoned Hedilla, who spent four years in prison and was sidelined from politics upon release.

The single party's statutes, published on 4 August, established that the "Caudillo" was accountable only "to God and History."

Two months earlier, on 3 June, during the Northern Campaign, General Mola, the "Director" of the military conspiracy that launched the July 1936 coup starting the Civil War, died when his plane crashed on a hill in Alcocero, near Burgos. Mola frequently used planes for travel, and no evidence of sabotage exists, though his death clearly favored Franco by eliminating a rival.

==== Consequences of the decree ====
In October 1937, the "Generalissimo" Franco appointed the 50 members of the National Council of FET y de las JONS, half of whom were Falangists, a quarter Carlists, plus five monarchists and eight military figures, including General Queipo de Llano. The Council remained a merely advisory body. with its newspaper, Arriba, becoming a mere appendage of the Army. In 1974, near the end of the Francoist dictatorship, a gravely ill Franco confessed to his personal doctor: "Falangists, in the end, are just rabble-rousing thugs."

However, Falangist leaders occupied many key administrative and party positions. Besides half the National Council members being Falangists, the new party secretary, appointed by the "Caudillo" in early December 1937, was Raimundo Fernández-Cuesta, the most prominent surviving "old shirt" Falangist, who had just arrived in the rebel zone after being exchanged for Republican Justino de Azcárate. Major national delegations of the new party were also held by Falangists: the Sección Femenina by Pilar Primo de Rivera; the Auxilio Social by Mercedes Sanz-Bachiller.

=== The birth of the "new state" ===
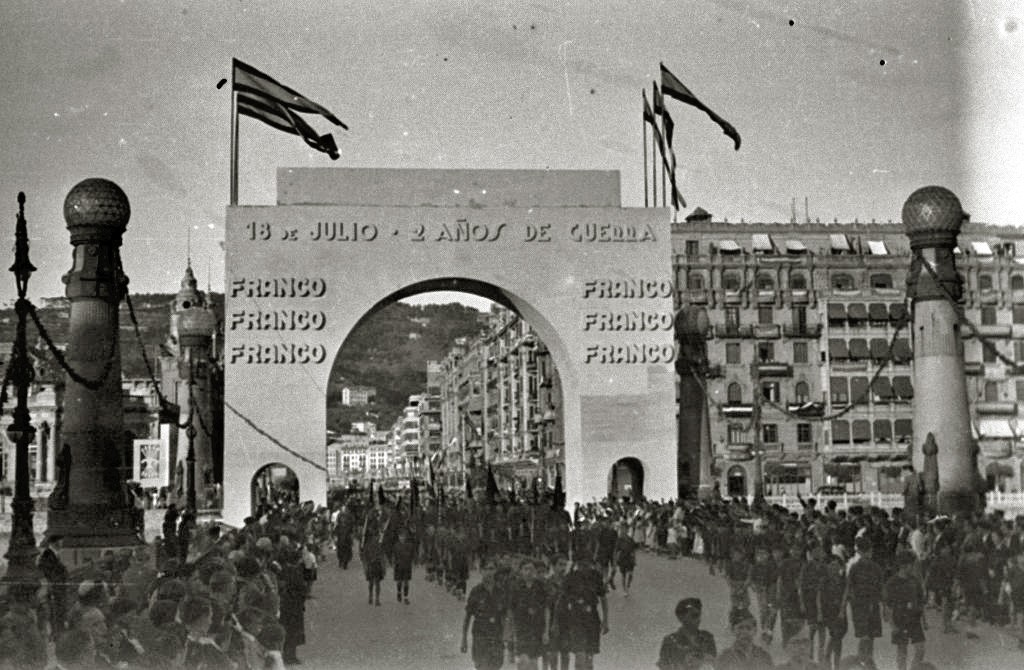
Parade in San Sebastián celebrating the second anniversary of the war's start, with an arch repeating Franco's name multiple times.

In January 1938, during the Battle of Teruel, a significant step toward the "New State’s" definitive configuration, which had been forming in the "National Zone" since Franco's proclamation as "Head of the Government of the State" on 1 October 1936, was taken with the promulgation by the "Generalissimo" of the Law of the Central State Administration, establishing a ministerial administrative structure, "a further step toward political normalization of a situation with no power source other than Franco’s person and the Army’s unanimous support." According to Julio Gil Pecharromán, the law "sanctioned the principles of power unity and function concentration typical of the totalitarian single-party system being built in National Spain," with articles 16 and 17 granting Franco absolute powers, including "the supreme authority to issue general legal norms" and placing ministers under his sole authority. This law, along with another issued by Franco shortly after the war, formed the legal foundation of his long dictatorship. On 30 January, the "Generalissimo" appointed his first government, assuming the Presidency himself, while Francisco Gómez-Jordana (former president of the Junta Técnica del Estado) was vice president and Minister of Foreign Affairs. Fidel Dávila, still commanding the Francoist Northern Army, was Minister of Defense; Severiano Martínez Anido, a veteran military figure and prominent repressor of Barcelona's anarcho-syndicalism in the 1920s, held the Public Order portfolio. However, the most prominent figure was Ramón Serrano Suñer, Minister of the Interior and Franco's cuñadísimo.

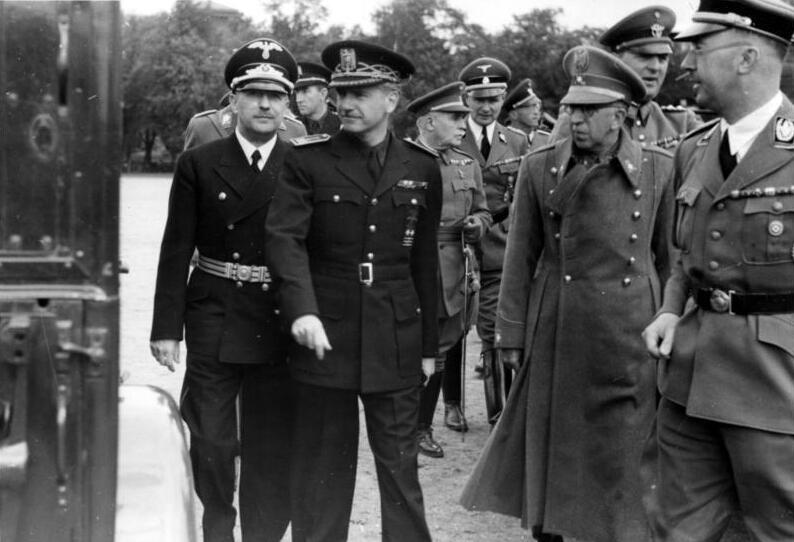
Visit to Berlin by Ramón Serrano Suñer, accompanied by General Sagardía, received by Himmler (September 1940).

The first Franco government featured "a distribution balancing the weight of permanent suppliers of high political and administrative personnel: military [4], Falangists [2], Catholics [1], monarchists of dual Alfonsine [2] or traditionalist [1] loyalty, and some independent technicians [1]." "Each sector controlled areas closest or dearest to them: military and public order ministries for the military; syndicalist movement and ‘social’ ministries for Falangists; economic ones for technical experts, lawyers, or engineers; and education and justice for Catholics, traditionalists, or former Acción Española members." Notably, Falangists and Carlists had minimal weight in this government. However, in lower ministry ranks, there were more members from key parties, especially Falange, prefiguring the ideological blend that would define Francoism. The Unification-created Party had little connection to the State's executive. (...) The only true common ground was their traditional conservatism and reactionary rightism."

Coat of arms of the "New State"

This government initiated the "New State’s" institutionalization:

On 9 March 1938, the National Council of FET y de las JONS, meeting for the first time, drafted the "Fuero del Trabajo" based on the Italian fascist Carta del Lavoro, establishing principles of "vertical syndicalism" (the "Central Nacional-Sindicalista" was created by decree on 21 April but only functioned post-war) and State economic intervention. Approved by Franco, who held not only State and Government leadership but legislative power, the "Fuero del Trabajo" was the first of seven Fundamental Laws of the Francoist Dictatorship that served as the regime's "constitution."

On 5 April 1937, the Statute of Autonomy of Catalonia of 1932 was repealed, and in the following months, a series of orders and decrees banned the use of the Catalan in public documents and private conversations. On 9 April 1938, a Press Law subjected newspapers to prior censorship and granted the government the authority to appoint newspaper directors. On 5 July 1938, the death penalty, which had been abolished by the Republic, was reintroduced. On 20 September 1938, a Secondary Education Law guaranteed the Catholic Church absolute autonomy in secondary education. This law also introduced what the Minister of National Education, Pedro Sainz Rodríguez, called the "classical baccalaureate," which he feared other ministers approving the law might consider "absurd due to the heavy emphasis on Latin and Greek studies."

According to Julián Casanova, fascism and Catholicism were the two ideologies upon which the "New State" was built. The process of fascistization was evident in the exaltation of the leader, the "Caudillo," akin to the Führer or Duce; the raised-arm salute established as the "national salute"; Falangist uniforms and symbolism; and more. Simultaneously, Catholic religious rituals and manifestations proliferated, such as processions, field masses, and politico-religious ceremonies imitating supposed medieval forms.

== Foreign intervention in support of the rebels ==
The two powers that stood out for their support of the Francoist cause were Nazi Germany and Fascist Italy. Their military participation was decisive in securing victory for the rebels, particularly due to their dominance of the airspace.

Support in personnel for the rebel side materialized through the German Condor Legion (approximately 6,000 men) and the Italian Corpo di Truppe Volontarie (up to 40,000 men), plus a contingent of Portuguese fighters known as Viriatos. To demonstrate their commitment to the rebel cause, on 18 November 1936, during the Siege of Madrid, Italy and Germany officially recognized General Franco and his Junta Técnica del Estado as Spain's legitimate government, appointing Roberto Cantalupo and Wilhelm von Faupel as ambassadors, respectively, who presented their credentials to the "Caudillo" in Salamanca. These two countries, along with Portugal, were the only European nations to officially recognize Franco by late 1936, joined by some small South American states.

German, Italian, and Portuguese fighters were regular soldiers paid in their home countries, though rebel propaganda presented them as "volunteers." Genuine volunteers fighting for the rebels numbered around 1,000 to 1,500, notably the Irish Brigade led by General Eoin O'Duffy, with about 500 men who came to Spain to "fight the battle of Christianity against communism" (though they only participated in the Battle of Jarama and returned to Ireland months later), and about 300 French far-right members of the Croix-de-Feu who formed the Jeanne d'Arc Battalion. The Irish Brigade, recruited by the pro-fascist O'Duffy, a general in the Irish Republican Army, arrived in Spain in December 1936 but played a symbolic role. Due to their indiscipline, they were relegated to minor operations and returned to Ireland in April 1937.

Also among the foreigners supporting the rebels were thousands of Moroccans from the Spanish Protectorate of Morocco, intensively recruited into the Regulares of the Army of Africa in exchange for payment.

Regarding armaments, according to Julio Aróstegui, the rebels received from Italy and Germany 1,359 aircraft, 260 tanks, 1,730 cannons, rifles, and ammunition for all. Additionally, American companies sold gasoline to Franco.

=== Immediate international aid ===
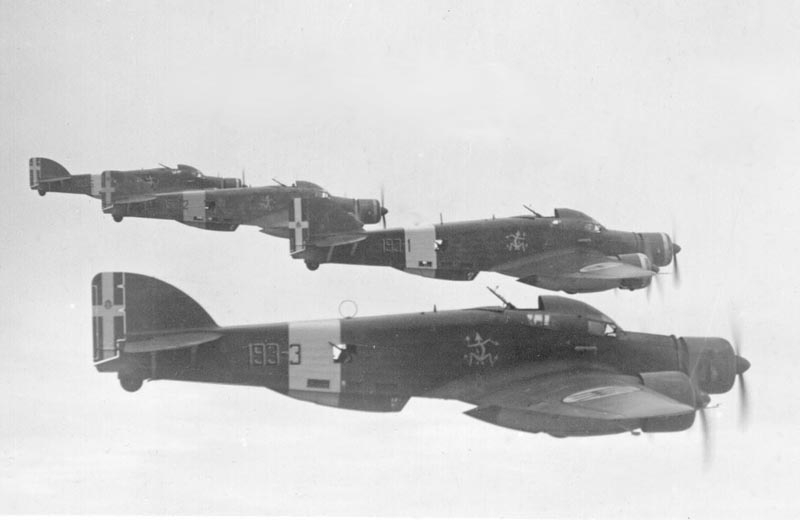
Italian Savoia-Marchetti SM.79 aircraft

Following the failure of the July 1936 coup to immediately seize power, the rebel military promptly requested and received aid from Fascist Italy and Nazi Germany. On 20 July 1936, General Franco, stranded in Africa and aiming to cross the strait with colonial troops, sent Luis Bolín and the Marquess of Luca de Tena to Rome to meet Mussolini for air support (similarly, General Mola sent Antonio Goicoechea, Luis Zunzunegui, and Pedro Sainz Rodríguez). Ten days later, on 30 July, nine of the twelve Savoia-Marchetti aircraft granted to Franco landed in Nador, in the Spanish Protectorate of Morocco (two landed in Algeria by mistake, providing evidence to the French government of fascist powers aiding the rebels). Mussolini decided to support Franco's request "after learning Hitler would back Franco and confirming that France and Britain would not intervene."

On 23 July, Franco's emissaries, led by Johannes Bernhardt, a merchant in Tétouan and head of the Nazi Party among the German colony, met Adolf Hitler in Bayreuth, who immediately approved the requested aircraft aid (conducted through the HISMA company as a front). On 26 July, the first twenty German Junkers Ju 52 transport aircraft, convertible to bombers, arrived in Morocco with escort fighters. These enabled General Franco to organize an airlift to the peninsula for legionaries and Regulares, securing air superiority over the Strait of Gibraltar. The 20 Junkers Ju 52s and 6 Heinkel He 51 fighters transported over 13,000 Army of Africa soldiers and 270 tons of material between late July and mid-October 1936. Thus, the blockade of the Army of Africa, the rebels’ main combat force for capturing Madrid after Mola's columns were halted in the Sierra de Guadarrama, was overcome thanks to rapid aid from Nazi Germany and Fascist Italy.

=== Nazi germany ===
The primary reason for Nazi Germany’s aid to Franco, as shown by historian Ángel Viñas, was that Hitler believed a rebel victory would serve Germany's foreign policy interests. In the "inevitable" European war Hitler anticipated, with France as an enemy, a pro-German, anti-communist military-led government in Spain was preferable to a republican one strengthening ties with France, Britain, and the Soviet Union (Nazi Germany's strategic and ideological foe for its expansionist plans in Eastern Europe). Hitler told Wilhelm von Faupel, the first Reich chargé d’affaires to Franco, in November 1936:

Your mission is solely to ensure that, once the war ends (with Franco's victory), foreign policy is not influenced by Paris, London, or Moscow.

Hitler's decision was also influenced by ideological and military factors. Hermann Göring, the Third Reich's second-in-command and Luftwaffe chief, stated at the Nuremberg trials in 1945 that he supported intervention in Spain:

First, to counter the spread of communism in this place, and second, to test my young air force... fighters, bombers, and anti-aircraft guns, allowing me to verify if the equipment was developed for its purpose.

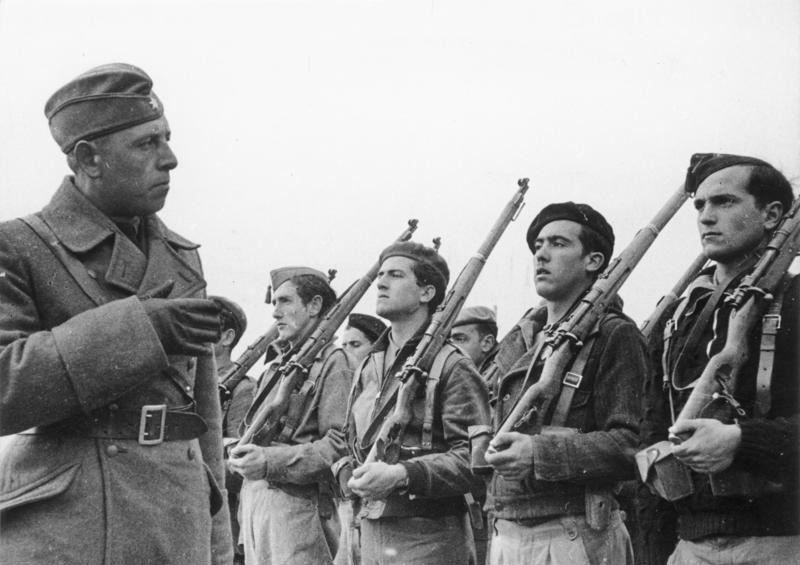
German Condor Legion officer inspecting cadets at the rebel infantry academy in Ávila.

Regarding Göring's first motive, the Nazis launched a propaganda campaign, controlled by Joseph Goebbels, framing the Spanish war as a clash between "fascists" and "Marxists," blaming the Soviet Union and "international communism" for causing it. For the second, the Nazis deployed the Condor Legion in the rebel zone, with well-paid members. In November 1936, alongside recognizing Franco, Hitler ordered the deployment of a complete air unit, the Condor Legion, as an autonomous unit within the rebel army, led by General Hugo Sperrle (later replaced by Wolfram von Richthofen of the Luftwaffe). It initially comprised four squadrons of Heinkel He 51 fighters and four of Junkers Ju 52 bombers, plus a battalion of 48 tanks and another of 60 anti-aircraft guns, with about 5,500 men (frequently rotated after gaining combat experience, totaling around 19,000 personnel in Spain). The Spanish Civil War thus served as a testing ground for the Luftwaffe, trialing weapons and tactics later used in World War II. Tested aircraft included Messerschmitt Bf 109 and Junkers Ju 87 A/B fighters and Junkers Ju 52 and Heinkel He 111 bombers. These units practiced city bombing tactics, culminating in the Bombing of Guernica.

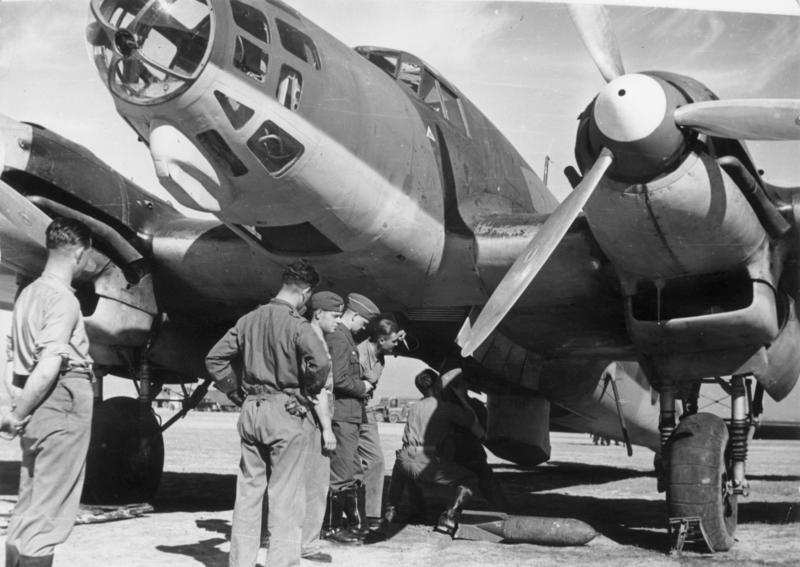
German technicians and military personnel with a Heinkel He 111 bomber of the Condor Legion in 1938. The air superiority provided by the Luftwaffe was only countered by the Republic with the arrival of Soviet aviation.

The Condor Legion remained in Spain throughout the war, participating in all major battles from November 1936, with about 620 aircraft deployed. 371 members died in combat. After participating in the Victory Parade in Madrid on 19 May 1939, under the "Generalissimo" Franco's presidency, the Condor Legion held its final official parade in Spain on 22 May 1939. They were transported to Germany by transatlantic ships and received in Hamburg by Hermann Göring.

In this final convoy, 5,136 German officers and soldiers carried about 700 tons of equipment and most remaining aircraft. They claimed the destruction of 386 enemy aircraft (313 in air combat), losing 232 of their own (72 to enemy action). Condor Legion aircraft dropped around 21,000 tons of bombs, significantly contributing to the "nationals’" final victory.

=== Fascist italy ===
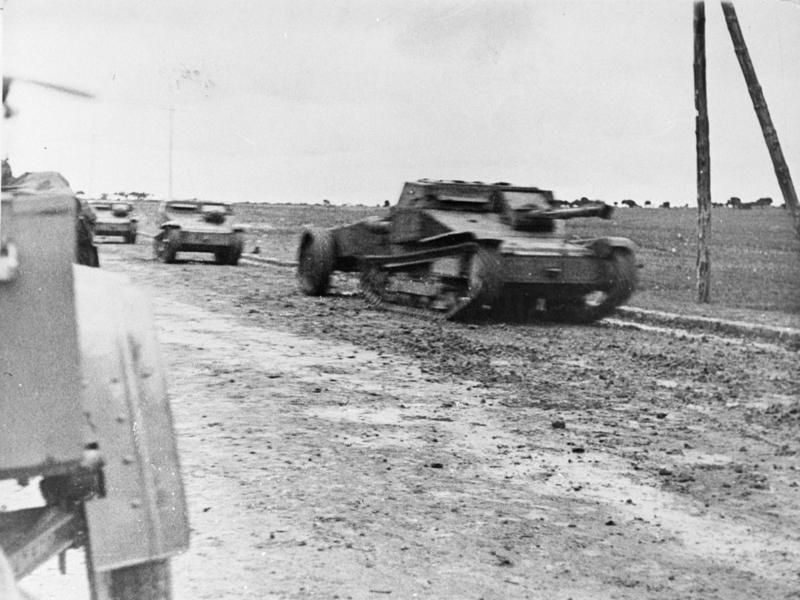
Advance of Italian CTV tanks during the Battle of Guadalajara.

The primary reason for Fascist Italy’s aid to the rebels was also tied to its foreign policy. Mussolini aimed to build a Mediterranean empire, believing an ally in Spain would weaken France and Britain's military positions. Like the Nazis, he used anti-communism in propaganda to justify intervention in the Spanish Civil War.

Italy sent the largest contingent of foreign fighters to the rebel side. From July 1936, Italian officers piloted Savoia-Marchetti SM.81 bombers and Fiat fighters within the Foreign Legion. From December 1936, a complete military unit, the Corpo di Truppe Volontarie (CTV), was deployed under General Mario Roatta until the Battle of Guadalajara disaster in March 1937, then led by Generals Ettore Bastico, Mario Berti, and Gastone Gambara. The CTV comprised 40,000 men (rotated, with 72,775 personnel passing through Spain: 43,129 from the Italian army and 29,646 from the fascist militia). Additionally, 5,699 served in the Aviazione Legionaria, making Italy's contribution far larger than Germany's or the International Brigades. The Aviazione Legionaria conducted 782 air raids on the Republican-controlled Mediterranean coast, dropping 16,558 bombs.

The Italian navy aided Franco’s arms blockade from the USSR with targeted actions and provided four "legionary submarines" to his fleet, selling four destroyers and two submarines. The Italian aid was, in Ramón Serrano Suñer’s words, the "largest, most delicate, and disinterested" assistance.

The CTV and Aviazione Legionaria fought until the war's end, though in late 1938, around the time the International Brigades left Spain, Mussolini withdrew about 10,000 CTV soldiers, a quarter of the force. They were farewelled in Cádiz by General Queipo de Llano and General Millán-Astray and received in Naples by Italy's King Victor Emmanuel III.

The approximate value of Italian aid was about 64 million pounds sterling.

=== Salazarist portugal ===
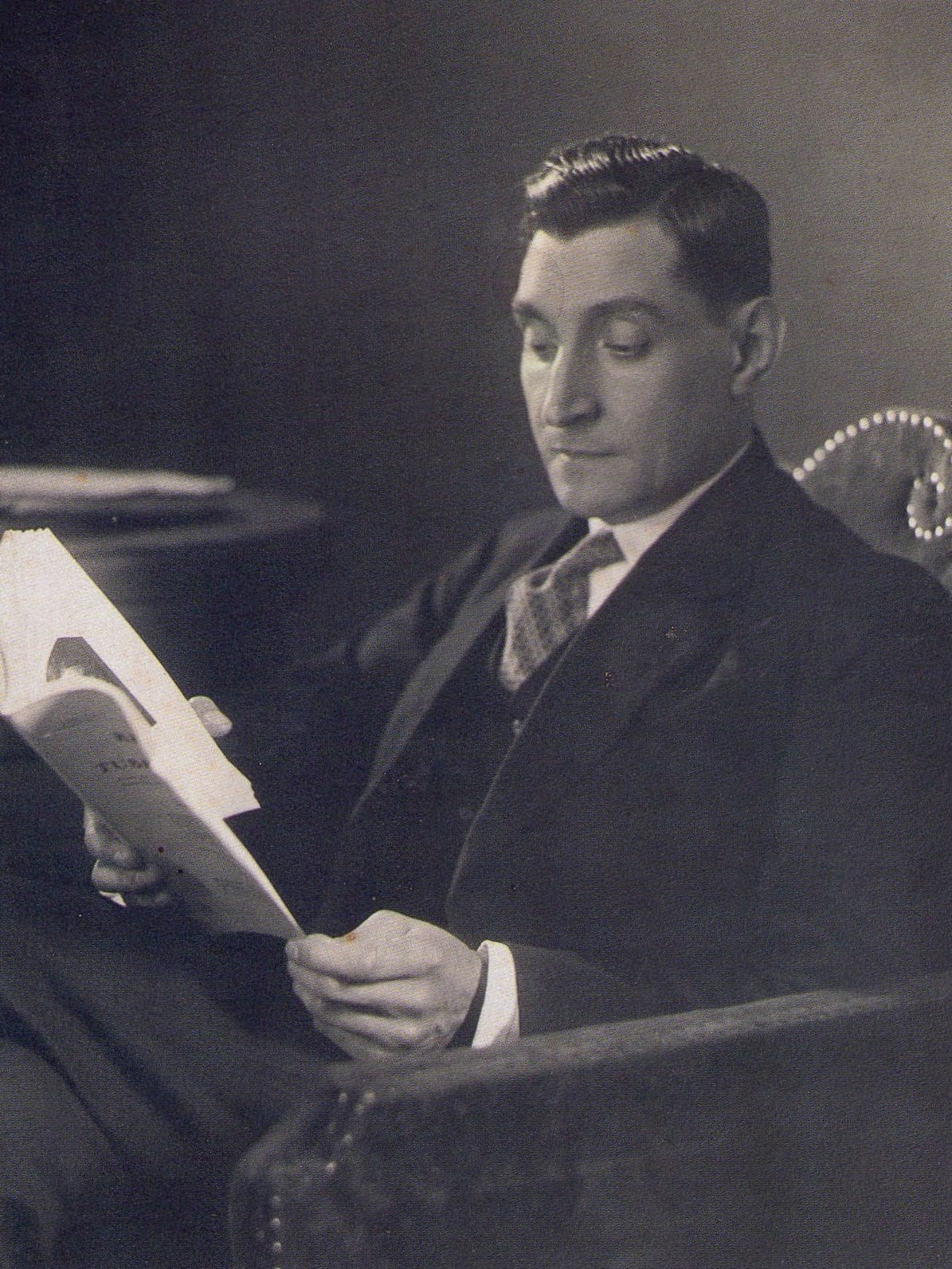
António de Oliveira Salazar around 1940.

Though less publicized, the aid from António de Oliveira Salazar’s Portuguese dictatorship was significant, especially in the war's early months, allowing rebels to use its roads, railways, and ports to connect the northern zone with Andalusia and returning fleeing Republicans to the rebel zone for repression. Portugal later served as a base for arms purchases and a staunch ally in the "non-intervention" farce, consistently defending the rebels in the Non-Intervention Committee and the League of Nations. During a visit to London, Portuguese Foreign Minister Armindo Monteiro told his British counterpart Anthony Eden:

A victory for the [rebel] Army would not necessarily mean a political victory for Italy or Germany, whereas a victory for the reds would inevitably be a victory for anarchy, with serious consequences for France and, consequently, for Europe, where communism's strength is already enormous.

To avoid internal issues for Portugal's Estado Novo, which sympathized with the rebellion from the outset, "volunteers" were recruited under the name Os Viriatos, integrated into "national" units. About 10,000 were enlisted and paid in Portugal.

== Armed forces ==
According to historian Francisco Alía Miranda, after the Spanish coup of July 1936, the distribution of generals, officers, and cadets was 8,929 in the Republican zone and 9,294 in the rebel zone. Troop numbers were 116,501 in the Republican zone and 140,604 in the rebel zone, including the 47,127 soldiers of the Army of Africa, Spain's most prepared and experienced military unit, giving the rebels an advantage. Another favorable factor was that while most generals and senior officers remained loyal to the Republic, many mid-level officers joined the rebellion. During the war, the rebel officer corps grew to 14,104 by 1 April 1939, while the Republican side shrank to 4,771, largely due to defections to the rebels. As Alía Miranda notes, most of Spain's 18,000 officers in July 1936 supported the coup, reflecting their conservative, corporatist, and militarist mindset.

By the war's end, the Francoist Army had 850,000 infantry soldiers, 19,000 artillerymen, and significant cavalry forces.

== Home front ==
=== Life behind the front lines ===
Initially, during the July 1936 coup, only about 30% of Spain's population supported or collaborated with the rebels. Among the rebel bourgeoisie, despite the war's duration, enthusiasm for the "crusade" remained strong. While defeated Republicans faced mistreatment in the rebel zone, such acts were justified as wartime necessities and sacrifices in the "national home front." Republican bombings in the rebel home front were few and generally insignificant due to the National Aviation’s air superiority. Nonetheless, limited attacks occurred on Seville, Burgos, Salamanca, or Valladolid, with the Bombing of Cabra in 1938 causing the most deaths.

From the summer of 1937, fairs and bullfights were regularly held. At 10:00 pm, Queipo de Llano’s voice was heard on café or household radios. At midnight, the daily communiqué reported casualties and prisoners, followed by the Marcha Real, signaling bedtime. Despite this, rebel Spain remained a militarized society. Women's roles were confined to traditional ones, though the Sección Femenina, led by Pilar Primo de Rivera, allowed them to serve as nurses or Auxilio Social volunteers in occupied zones’ home front. Unlike the Republican zone, the rebel zone introduced the "Single Dish Day," where on the 1st and 15th of each month, restaurants, taverns, and hospitality establishments served a single dish but charged full price, with the surplus donated to charity.

The war's progress significantly impacted the home front: beyond triumphalism for victories in the campaigns of Santander, Asturias, or Aragon, events like the Republican offensive on Teruel or the Ebro Offensive were unwelcome surprises. After the Battle of the Ebro, morale in the Francoist zone rose again, fueled by propaganda in the press, radio, and literary campaigns flooding the country. This propaganda was half Catholic and half monarchist, increasingly fascist in tone. The Catalonia Offensive and the fall of Republican Spain in early 1939 were exultant triumphs in the Francoist home front.

However, as Radio Nacional de España emphasized, the war's end did not bring peace:

Spaniards, stay alert! Peace is not a comfortable and cowardly rest before history [...]. Spain remains on a war footing.

=== Repression ===
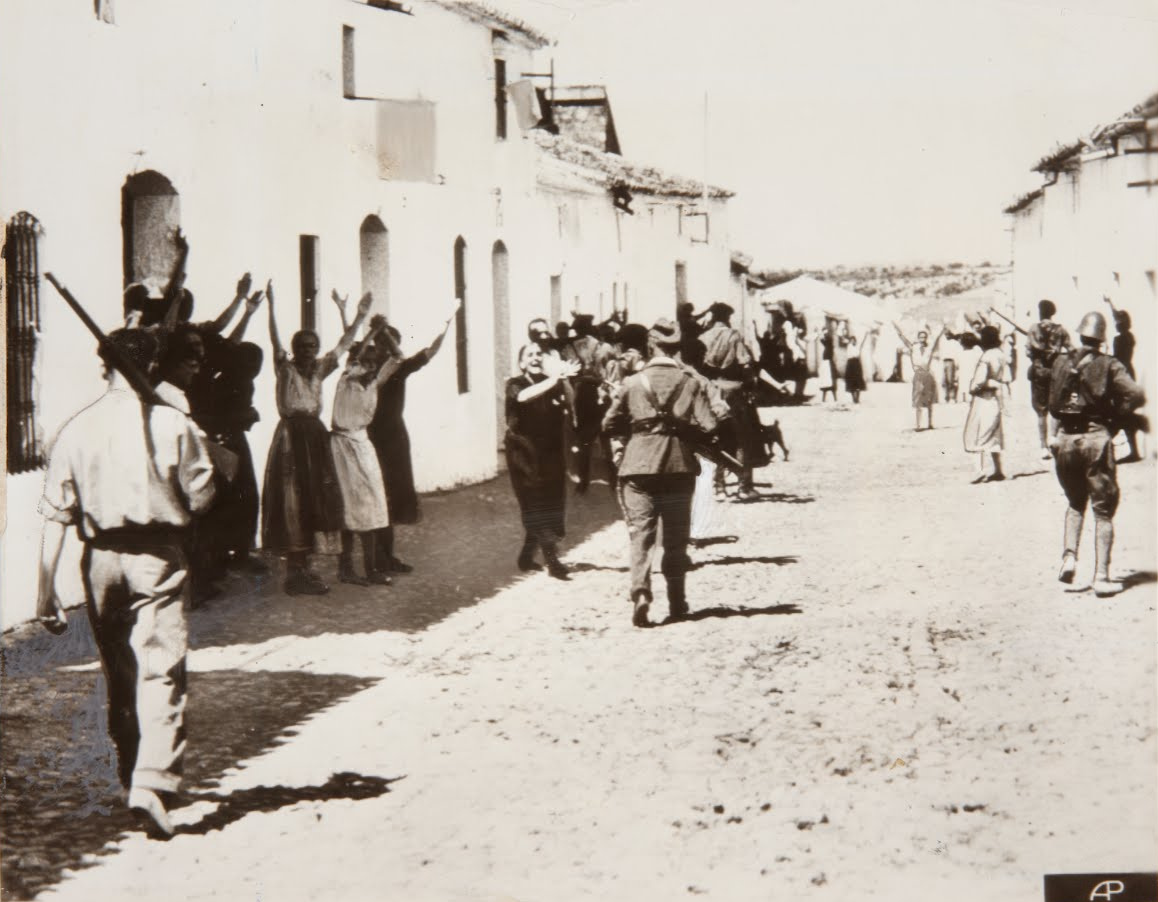
Women pleading with rebel soldiers for the lives of imprisoned relatives in Constantina, Seville, summer 1936.

Franco was fully aware of his subordinates’ excesses in repression and openly tolerated them. Initially, death sentences only required the signature or a simple "noted" from the military commander of each territory. As the supreme military commander, Franco had the final say on death sentences. Repression was not limited to executions; Francoist prisons also saw torture, mistreatment, and starvation. By the war's end, many women and children of Republicans were imprisoned. Any compromise for a negotiated peace was unthinkable in the "Caudillo’s" mindset, as he expressed after the war:

It is necessary to liquidate the hatreds and passions of our past war, but not in the liberal style, with their monstrous and suicidal amnesties, which entail more fraud than forgiveness, but through redemption of the penalty by work, with repentance and penance; anyone who thinks otherwise is either reckless or treacherous.

=== Nationalist faction support ===
The political organizations supporting the Nationalists shared several commonalities, including nationalist, conservative, and anti-communist ideologies, as well as a strong Catholic foundation. Following the military conflict, Franco succeeded in merging all these groups into a single party, the Falange Española Tradicionalista y de las Juntas de Ofensiva Nacional-Sindicalista, conceived as the political arm of the so-called Movimiento Nacional.

- The Confederación Española de Derechas Autónomas (CEDA) was an alliance of right-wing Catholic political parties formed during the progressive biennium of the Second Republic. Led by José María Gil-Robles, it was the largest mass right-wing party in Spain during the Republic, presenting itself from its inception as an alternative not only to the Popular Front but to the Republic itself. Already antagonistic toward the Republic from its founding, the execution of prominent party members such as Federico Salmón, Dimas de Madariaga, Ricardo Cortés Villasana, Juan Bautista Guerra García, Antonio Bermúdez Cañete, and Romualdo Alvargonzález in the early days of the war prompted the party's definitive alignment with the Nationalist faction.

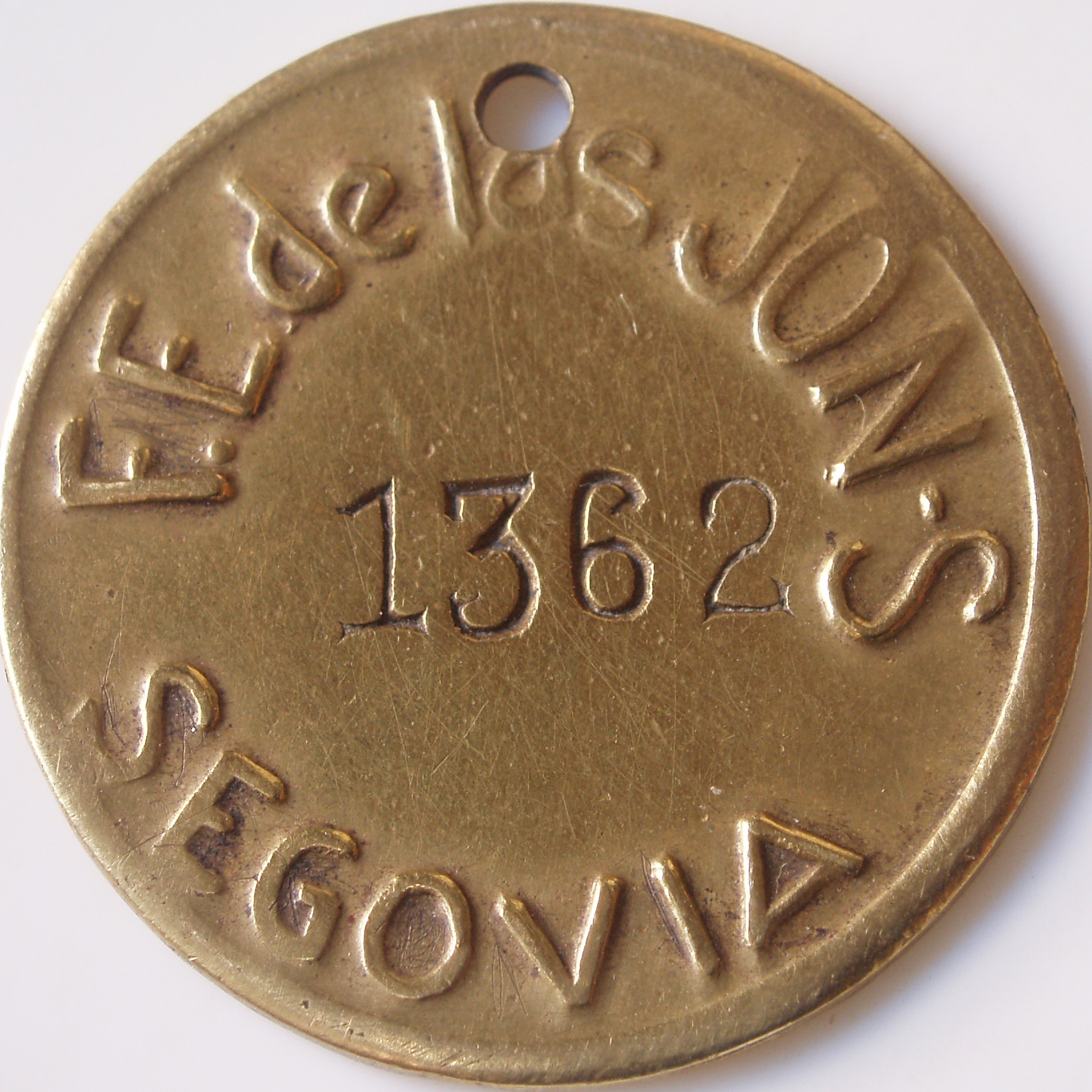
Military identification badge assigned to Falangist volunteers from Segovia.

- Falange Española, a political party with a fascist ideology, was founded by José Antonio Primo de Rivera in 1933. It emerged with support from reactionary forces and right-wing parties, which used it as a shock force. It did not achieve significant popular support, but its frequent raids and clashes with the most radical left-wing groups, along with its violent acts and assassinations, contributed to creating an atmosphere of insecurity and violence conducive to military uprisings. Both Primo de Rivera and Onésimo Redondo, leader of the Juntas de Ofensiva Nacional-Sindicalista, died during the first months of the war. The Falangists played a decisive role in the brutal repression carried out by the Nationalists during the conflict.
- Carlism, a traditionalist and legitimist political movement with an anti-liberal and counterrevolutionary character, emerged in Spain in the 19th century, with the primary goal of establishing an alternative branch of the Bourbon dynasty on the Spanish throne. Since the proclamation of the Second Republic, the Carlists began organizing militarily. In the 1936 general elections, the Traditionalist Communion secured 10 seats in right-wing candidacies. In April 1936, the Carlists planned their own armed uprising against the Republic, led by Manuel Fal Conde and José Luis Zamanillo, who had formed the Carlist Supreme Military Junta. The plan was discovered and thwarted by Republican authorities. Nevertheless, the Carlist paramilitary faction, the Requetés, played a significant role in the war, distinguished by their extreme violence.
- The Alfonsist monarchists were the political faction that, during the Second Republic, advocated for a return to monarchy as the political system and the restoration of the Isabelline branch of the dynasty. Their pretender was Alfonso XIII of Spain, who was forced to abdicate as monarch following the 12 April 1931, municipal elections, the results of which were interpreted as a rejection of his reign. Its members integrated into Renovación Española, a monarchist political party founded by prominent Alfonsists Antonio Goicoechea and the Count of Vallellano. However, the Alfonsists were not particularly active during this period, though they supported various destabilizing movements. Juan de Borbón, son of the exiled King Alfonso XIII, attempted to join the Nationalist ranks in August 1936, but the generals leading the rebellion rejected his participation, (Note: Some authors argue that the decision to prevent Don Juan de Borbón from participating in the war came from Mola, while others point directly to Franco.) fearing a division between the two monarchist groups.

=== War economy ===
Midway through the war, the Nationalist currency remained stable, prices of essential goods had not risen significantly, and cities did not face the specter of hunger that was already evident in Republican Spain. The supply of coal and other materials was also adequate.

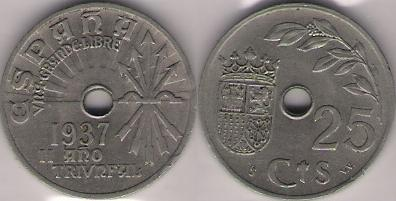
Nationalist coins from 1937, with a value of 25 cents.

The methods employed in the Nationalist zone to finance the war included the following:

- Economic aid and financing received from Germany and Italy;
- Creation of a new national central Bank of Spain in Burgos, which advanced the new state a credit of 9 million pesetas. This new central bank issued new banknotes totaling 9,000 million pesetas of the time.
- Deferral by the state of interest payments on the debt and 60% of the value of war supplies;
- Reduction of non-essential expenditures;
- Creation of new taxes to increase revenue.

In addition, in July 1937, the Junta Técnica del Estado ordered the freezing of bank accounts throughout the zone under its jurisdiction. Subsequently, a monetary reunification was carried out, and the Bank Unlocking Law of 7 December 1939, allowed the conversion of old Republican currency. This law was designed for application to the Republican population, as it was clearly retroactive and repressive with regard to bank accounts in the Republican zone during the conflict. (Note: Among other things, it proceeded to discriminate between debts and deposits made in the Republican zone, leaving the investigation of political records and their possible consequences for a second period.)

By the end of 1938, the economic situation in the Franco-controlled zone had worsened compared to a year earlier, with some prices inflating dramatically, although industrial and mining production exceeded peacetime levels. However, this industrial growth was directed toward war needs and the trade of raw materials with Germany and Italy. The new Francoist state had opted for economic autarky that year, which in reality led to economic and social disaster. The disastrous state interventionism in the economy, coupled with increasing corruption among many state officials, foreshadowed the situation that would unfold in the post-war period.

On the other hand, the Republican offensive on the Ebro had caused pessimism among Spanish nationalists. The successes in Aragon during the previous spring had given way to pessimism in the face of the failure of the offensive to take Valencia and now the new failure to stop the attack launched by the Republican troops from Catalonia, who were considered practically useless since the defeats in March and April. There was talk of defeatism even in Burgos, and the ever-exalted Falangists murmured against Franco and Martínez Anido, the septuagenarian minister in charge of repression in Franco's Spain as Minister of Public Order. Franco was particularly alarmed by the Czechoslovak crisis, as he was aware of his future in the event of a widespread European war. Aware of this danger and that he could end up fighting against France, he sent 20,000 prisoners to work on the border fortifications in the Pyrenees and Spanish Morocco. Franco was unaware of Hitler's intentions and feared that the Germans, whom he had always distrusted, might stop supplying him with the precious military aid on which he so depended.

== See also ==
- First Francoism

== Bibliography ==
- Abella, Rafael (2004). La vida cotidiana durante la Guerra Civil: La España nacional [Everyday Life During the Civil War: Nationalist Spain] (in Spanish). Editorial Planeta. ISBN 9788408051589.
- Alía Miranda, Francisco (2018). Historia del Ejército español y de su intervención política [History of the Spanish Army and Its Political Intervention] (in Spanish). Madrid: Los Libros de la Catarata. ISBN 978-84-9097-459-9.
- Aróstegui, Julio (1997). La Guerra Civil. La ruptura democrática [The Civil War: The Democratic Rupture] (in Spanish). Madrid: Historia 16. ISBN 84-7679-320-0.
- Beevor, Antony (2005). La Guerra Civil Española [The Spanish Civil War] (in Spanish). Barcelona: Crítica. ISBN 9788484326656.
- Casanova, Julio (2007). República y Guerra Civil. Vol. 8 de la Historia de España, dirigida por Josep Fontana y Ramón Villares [Republic and Civil War. Vol. 8 of the History of Spain, directed by Josep Fontana and Ramón Villares] (in Spanish). Barcelona: Crítica/Marcial Pons. ISBN 978-84-8432-878-0.
- Castro Berrojo, Luis (2006). Capital de la Cruzada: Burgos durante la Guerra Civil [Capital of the Crusade: Burgos During the Civil War] (in Spanish). Editorial Crítica. ISBN 978-84-8432-722-6.
- Gil Pecharromán, Julio (2008). Con permiso de la autoridad. La España de Franco (1939-1935) [With the Authority's Permission: Franco's Spain (1939-1935)] (in Spanish). Madrid: Temas de Hoy. ISBN 978-84-8460-693-2.
- Jackson, Gabriel (1976). La República Española y la Guerra Civil, 1931-1939 [The Spanish Republic and the Civil War, 1931-1939] (in Spanish). (The Spanish Republic and the Civil War, 1931-1939. Princeton, 1965) (2nd ed.). Barcelona: Crítica. ISBN 84-7423-006-3.
- Juliá, Santos (1999). Un siglo de España. Política y sociedad [A Century of Spain: Politics and Society] (in Spanish). Madrid: Marcial Pons. ISBN 84-9537903-1.
- Preston, Paul (1994). Franco "Caudillo de España" [Franco "Caudillo of Spain"] (Third ed.). Barcelona: Grijalbo. ISBN 84-253-2498-X.
- Preston, Paul (2008). El Gran manipulador. La Mentira cotidiana de Franco [The Great Manipulator: Franco's Everyday Lie] (in Spanish). Ediciones B S.A. ISBN 9788466638296.
- Tamames, Ramón (1974). Historia de España Alfaguara VII. La República. La Era de Franco [History of Spain Alfaguara VII: The Republic. The Franco Era] (in Spanish). Madrid: Alianza Editorial.
- Thomas, Hugh (1976). La Guerra Civil Española [The Spanish Civil War] (in Spanish). Barcelona: Ed. Grijalbo. ISBN 84-253-2767-9.
