= Comisión de Cultura y Enseñanza =

Spanish Civil War commission

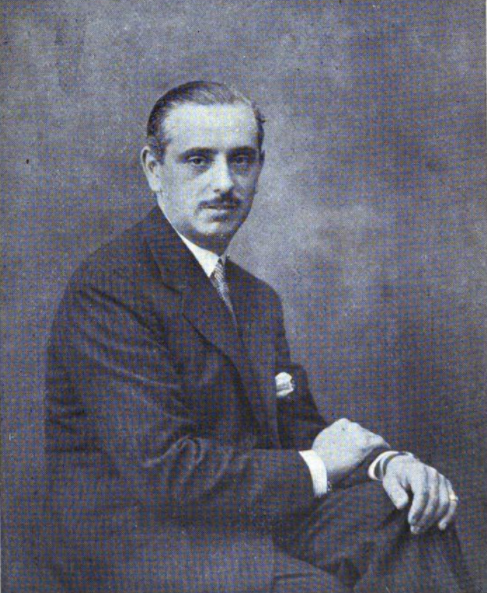
- José María Pemán, President of the Commission

Agency overview
- Formed: 2 October 1936
- Preceding agency: National Defense Junta
- Dissolved: 30 January 1938
- Superseding agency: Ministry of National Education
- Type: Government agency
- Jurisdiction: Nationalist zone
- Headquarters: (Spain) Burgos
- Agency executive: President José María Pemán; Vice President Enrique Suñer; Members Eugenio Vegas Latapie Mariano Puigdollers Alfonso García Valdecasas Romualdo de Toledo
- Parent department: Junta Técnica del Estado
- Parent agency: President of the Junta
- Child agency: Comisiones depuradoras del personal docente Juntas de Cultura histórica y del Tesoro Artístico Centros de enseñanza (Teaching personnel purge commissions Historical Culture and Artistic Treasure Juntas Teaching centers)

The Comisión de Cultura y Enseñanza (English: Commission for Culture and Teaching) was one of seven sectoral departments that formed the Junta Técnica del Estado, which was, in turn, one of the various political-administrative bodies created by General Francisco Franco in October 1936 following his appointment as head of government of rebel Spain during the Spanish Civil War. Presided over by José María Pemán, the Culture and Teaching Commission was arguably the Junta with the highest political profile within a body made up of individuals with little political relevance. Its most significant achievement was the continuation and institutionalization of the purge of teaching staff, which had already been initiated by the National Defense Junta. It was dissolved with the creation of Franco's first government in January 1938.

== Context ==
On 1 October 1936, General Francisco Franco officially took office as head of government, although all official media referred to him from the outset as "Head of State," thereby increasing his power. His primary priority was achieving military victory, and he was in no hurry to form a genuine government. Therefore, he contented himself with creating a General Secretariat of the Head of State headed by his brother Nicolás and a Junta Técnica del Estado, which was a more technical than political body. On 2 October, the newly renamed Official State Gazette published the Law establishing these and other bodies. Both the terminology used in the legal text and the provisional nature of the institution are characteristic of military language, which sought to create a kind of rear-guard administration to solve the most immediate problems, but subordinated to the fundamental objective of achieving military victory.

== The Junta ==
The Junta Técnica del Estado consisted of a presidency and seven commissions. Its main headquarters were in Burgos. Although its composition into commissions resembled an incipient Council of Ministers, it was made up of second-rank figures who handled routine administrative functions. The Board was headed by a president responsible not only for directing the institution but also for serving as a channel of communication with the Head of State, who held final decision-making power on all matters. The President was required to meet with the commission presidents at least once a week and communicated with Franco through direct reports. The initial appointee was Fidel Dávila, a brigadier general who was also appointed chief of the general staff.

== Composition and ideology ==
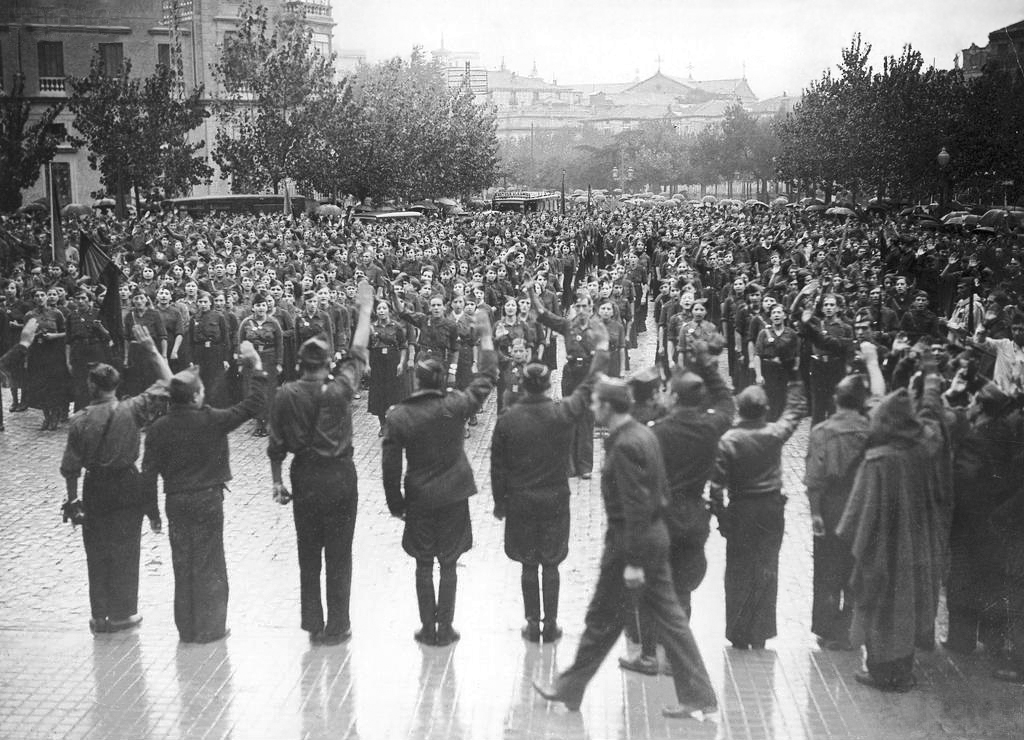
The Commission did not resonate with the Falangists. Pictured: Falangist rally in the Plaza del Pilar on 12 October 1936.

One of the Junta's commissions was to be dedicated to culture. The initial idea for its creation came from Eugenio Vegas Latapie, who had proposed establishing a commission responsible for culture and propaganda that would include figures such as José María Pemán, the Count of Rodezno, José Pemartín, Pedro Sainz Rodríguez, Juan José López Ibor, and Eugenio Montes. However, the authorities decided to separate culture from propaganda and rejected some of the names, particularly that of Sainz Rodríguez.

The Commission for Culture and Teaching was undoubtedly the one with the most distinctly political composition. It was dominated by monarchists linked to the Acción Española group, such as its president, José María Pemán, and the members Eugenio Montes and Vegas Latapie. Additionally, José Ignacio Escobar served as a non-permanent advisor. Outside this group were the other members, Mariano Puigdollers —a Traditionalist— and Alfonso García Valdecasas, who had participated in the inaugural rally of Falange Española in 1933 but had not played a significant role in that party subsequently. Another influential member was Romualdo de Toledo.

Pemán, a native of Cádiz, belonged to a conservative high-society family. He held a doctorate in Law and had achieved literary success with his poems and plays. Politically, he positioned himself in favour of the Dictatorship and served as local leader of the Patriotic Union, the party sponsored by Primo de Rivera. With the arrival of the Republic, he quickly distinguished himself against the regime with calls for military insurrection, becoming a reference point for the reactionary right. He supported the Sanjurjada, which forced him into exile for a time. When the uprising broke out, he placed himself at the service of the rebel military. In the words of Pedro Sainz Rodríguez, he was "a good name for propaganda."

Pemán attempted to avoid the presidency, arguing that his role was that of an orator who harangues the masses, not the head of an administrative body. According to his later account, he was pressured —particularly by General Emilio Mola— and had to accept, but he stipulated that a vice-president be appointed to the commission who could replace him and complement him in bureaucratic functions. The chosen candidate was the Integrist-minded paediatrician Enrique Suñer, who joined somewhat belatedly after managing to flee the enemy zone. In fact, Suñer replaced Pemán in almost all meetings with the other commission presidents.

The president's relations with the Falangists were not good. The magazine Jerarquía labelled him an "old thing, rhetoric," and he himself held no better opinion of the Falangists, whom he considered a "deliquescent, vague, and narcissistic group." This continued even after the unification, to the extent that Pemán commented to the president of the Junta —by then Jordana— that the Commission was becoming a "refuge and headquarters for everything left out of the single party."

Pemán himself shared the anti-Semitic atmosphere prevalent in Nationalist Spain, which identified Judaism with liberalism and Marxism. He proclaimed that "bad intellectuals must die" and in his Poema de la bestia y el ángel (Poem of the Beast and the Angel), he blamed the synagogue and the Masonic lodge for Spain's ills. In this context, "the synagogue" encompassed the entire left.

== Objectives ==
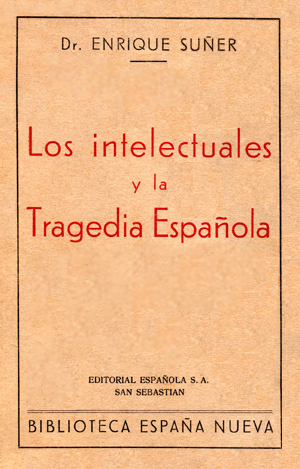
In this book, Enrique Suñer explained the purpose of the purge.

Beginning in 1931, the republican authorities had implemented certain reforms that were contested from the outset by Catholic and conservative sectors. The Government prohibited religious orders from continuing their educational work, affecting nearly five thousand primary schools and 295 secondary schools. Although the Catholic Church was able to maintain its influence in these centres through intermediaries, the measure was highly controversial. The use of Catalan as a vehicular language in education was also disputed. Other contentious measures included replacing the 1914 Study Plan with a new Professional Teaching Plan in 1931 and changing the access system to the teaching profession, replacing the traditional system of competitive examinations with short courses to substantially increase the number of primary school teachers. A professional sector felt disadvantaged by these reforms and repeatedly demonstrated its hostility long before the outbreak of the war. Although the idea that teachers were predominantly in favour of the republican reforms later became widespread, the reality is that progressive unions were a minority, and there was a large group of educators trained in traditional methodological principles who were highly critical of the changes.

The Commission for Culture and Teaching continued the work already initiated by the National Defense Junta aimed at dismantling all the educational reforms carried out by the republican governments. Aside from the actions of the Junta Técnica del Estado —and as happened with other groups— during the first months of the war, the physical elimination of hundreds of educators took place. An undetermined number of teachers were murdered in paseos and prison massacres, or executed after summary courts-martial. Leftist teachers were particularly accused by the rebels of being the cause of Spain's grave situation. A well-known circular signed by José María Pemán although drafted by Vegas, defined them as "poisoners of the popular soul." But the Commission went further and regulated the purge of teaching staff, which was applied uniformly throughout the national territory with the exception of Navarre, where the rebels had created a Superior Board of Education that carried out the same task autonomously.

However, the suppressive work reached back beyond the republican reforms. The aforementioned circular from President Pemán stated that:

The individuals who make up those revolutionary hordes, whose outrages cause such terror, are simply the spiritual children of university professors and teachers who, through institutions such as the so-called 'Free Institution of Education,' forged unbelieving and anarchic generations.

And Vice President Suñer published his book Los intelectuales y la Tragedia Española (The Intellectuals and the Spanish Tragedy) on 28 February 1937, in which he expounded his theses. Among other things, he stated:

And all this appalling death toll, is it to remain without just punishment?... Our spirit rebels against a possible impunity for the ruthless perpetrators of our tragedy. (...) For us, there is no doubt: the main culprits of this endless series of horrifying dramas are those who, for years, have pedantically called themselves 'intellectuals'.

And as the concept of "intellectual" was too broad, he made explicit the objective of eradicating from the University the presence...

... of the Junta para Ampliación de Estudios e Investigaciones Científicas (...) a breeding ground for a teaching staff, with rare exceptions, quite adherent to the cause that had chosen it for the achievement of catechetical ends, the primary of all: the de-Catholicisation of Spain.

And he added:

One of the most serious failings of [the Dictatorship of Primo de Rivera], in my opinion, was not having known how to act (...) with 'dictatorial' methods, in which just repression reached the necessary degree. (...) With a few dozen capital punishments imposed on those at the top, and the necessary deportations and expulsions from the national territory, many of the maniacs, agitators, and cowardly revolutionaries causing our present misfortunes would have fallen into absolute silence.

All of this reveals the desire of the new rulers to completely end not only the republican reforms but also the work of the Free Institution of Education.

== Purge of the teaching staff ==
=== Regulations ===
Scholars have highlighted the special influence of Enrique Suñer —a person held in very low regard by intellectuals not closely identified with the regime, such as José Ortega y Gasset— as the main driving force behind the process of purging the teaching staff. According to Vegas Latapie's later account, he himself raised initial opposition to Suñer, who was consistently supported by Puigdollers. The vice-president emerged triumphant from the showdown due to Pemán's passivity, and Vegas eventually left the Commission. Decree No. 66, which regulated the purging of teachers, was published in the BOE on 11 November 1936, but a draft of broader scope for all teaching staff, which was even more severe, had already been prepared beforehand. The preamble of the regulation stated:

The attention that teaching problems merit, so vital for the progress of peoples, would be sterilised if a purifying effort were not previously carried out among the personnel entrusted with such an important mission as the pedagogical one.
The fact that for several decades the teaching profession at all levels, and with increasingly rare exceptions, has been influenced and almost monopolised by dissolving ideologies and institutions, in open opposition to the national genius and tradition, makes it necessary that, in the solemn moments we are going through, a total and profound revision be carried out among the personnel of Public Instruction, a preliminary step to a radical and definitive reorganisation of education, thus tearing out by the roots those false doctrines which, with their apostles, have been the main factors of the tragic situation to which our Fatherland was led.

Decree 66 created various commissions responsible for evaluating the behaviour of teachers at each educational level: Commission A, tasked with purging University staff; Commission B for teaching staff at special schools for engineers and architects; Commission C for personnel at secondary schools, normal schools, commercial schools, arts and crafts schools, labour schools, primary education inspection, and all those not assigned to the other commissions; and Commission D for primary school teaching staff. The Order of 10 November 1936 regulated where the commissions would be established and their internal functioning. Although severe and almost inquisitorial, the regulations approved by the Junta Técnica represented a certain progress compared to those previously applied by the National Defense Junta, as they allowed for the defence of the accused and the decision was no longer based on a single, subjective opinion. (Note: The purge was not exclusive to the rebel zone. In the governmental zone, a similar purge was also carried out, although ideologically inverted. After an initial phase carried out by multiple revolutionary committees without any guarantees, the republican authorities opened files that also investigated the political ideas, professional performance, and private lives of teachers. The topic has been studied less than the Francoist purge by modern historiography.)

=== Procedure ===
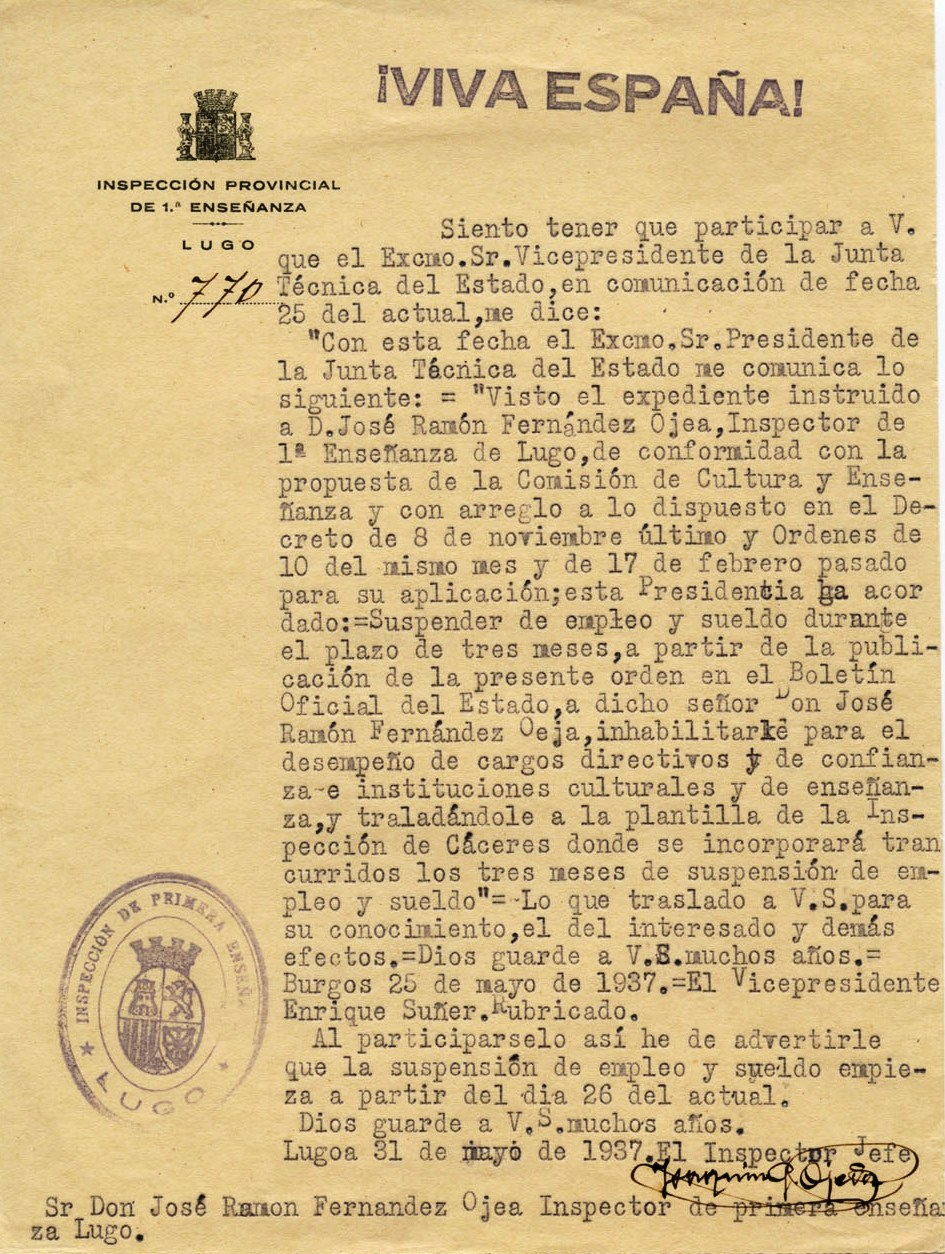
Suspension from employment and salary, disqualification, and transfer.

The purge affected not only suspects but all teaching staff, as indicated in Decree 66 and specified in the implementing Order of 10 November 1936. Civil servants, interim staff, substitutes, and employees of charitable teaching foundations had to request clearance. Teachers at private companies were purged by them. The process extended as new territories were conquered by the Francoist faction and the 'New State' had to be implanted there. Since the territories conquered after the July 1936 coup had offered greater resistance, the harshness of the 'cleansing' applied was also greater. Thus, an Order of 3 July 1937 extended the purge to the recently occupied province of Biscay. All teaching civil servants were provisionally suspended from their posts and given a period of twenty days to apply for reinstatement by means of an application to be submitted to the Rectorate of the University of Valladolid. Those who did not do so would be automatically separated from service. Conversely, those who had been purged by the republican authorities could recover their jobs. A similar order was issued on 1 September following the occupation of the province of Santander and another on 19 November after the definitive fall of Asturias. Thus, although some authors have noted possible peculiarities in the Basque case, the procedure was, in fact, very similar throughout Spanish territory.

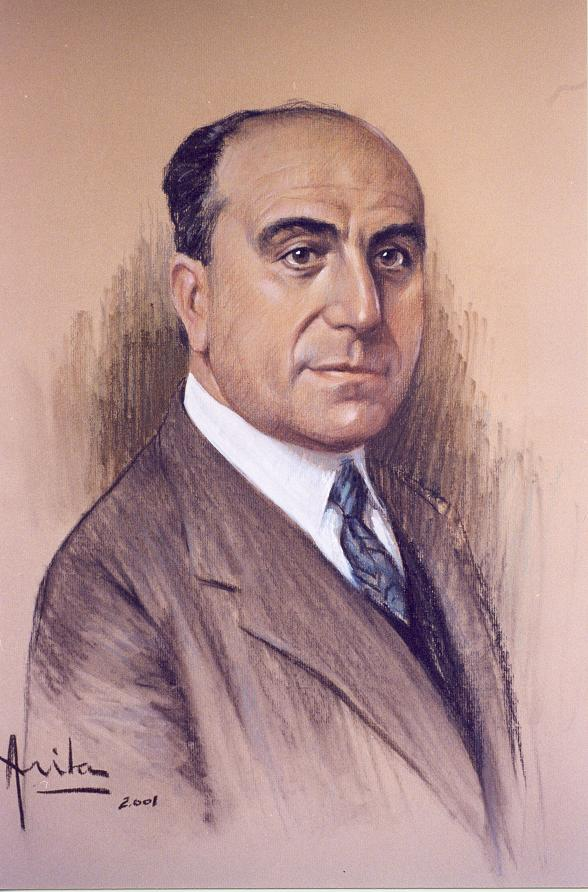
Vice President Enrique Suñer was the strongman of the Commission and applied the purge regulations with extreme rigour.

Membership in leftist parties or trade unions, holding public office, and participation in political acts were grounds for indictment. However, the scrutiny went beyond ideologies, also examining religious beliefs and adherence to Catholic precepts, the use of advanced pedagogical methodologies in the professional field, and aspects of private life such as sexual relations. Events occurring between the October 1934 insurrection and the July 1936 coup were considered particularly serious, as for behaviours after the coup, at least the mitigating or extenuating circumstance of state of necessity could be alleged. The possible sanctions were initially only definitive separation from service and forced transfer.

On 28 January 1937, Vice President Suñer addressed a circular to the various purge commissions providing "clarifying and complementary rules" to existing legislation. He indicated that priority should be given to processing the files of persons suspended from employment and salary so as not to cause them greater harm if they were finally acquitted; in such cases, he also requested that it be indicated whether or not they were recognised as entitled to payment of wages corresponding to the suspension period. It was also noted that the processing of proceedings must be secret. But the most striking aspect is the specification that commissions and their members could recommend imposing a sanction even if the file did not contain sufficient written evidence. It was sufficient that they deemed it appropriate "in conscience".

A subsequent Order of 17 February 1937 added lighter sanctions than the first: disqualification from holding management positions, compulsory retirement for civil servants with twenty years of service, and suspension from employment and salary for a period between one month and two years. The latter could also be applied as a precautionary measure while the file was being processed. The war itself and the purge process led to a shortage of teaching staff, which resulted in broader application of sanctions that allowed continuing to count on the teacher's services. Forced transfer seemed very appropriate for people with nationalist ideas and for cases not considered serious.

An Order of 29 April 1937 regulated the purge of students at normal schools for primary teacher training. This was mandatory for all students, including those in their final year of teaching practice. In addition to the generally required reports, a report from each of the professors was also required.

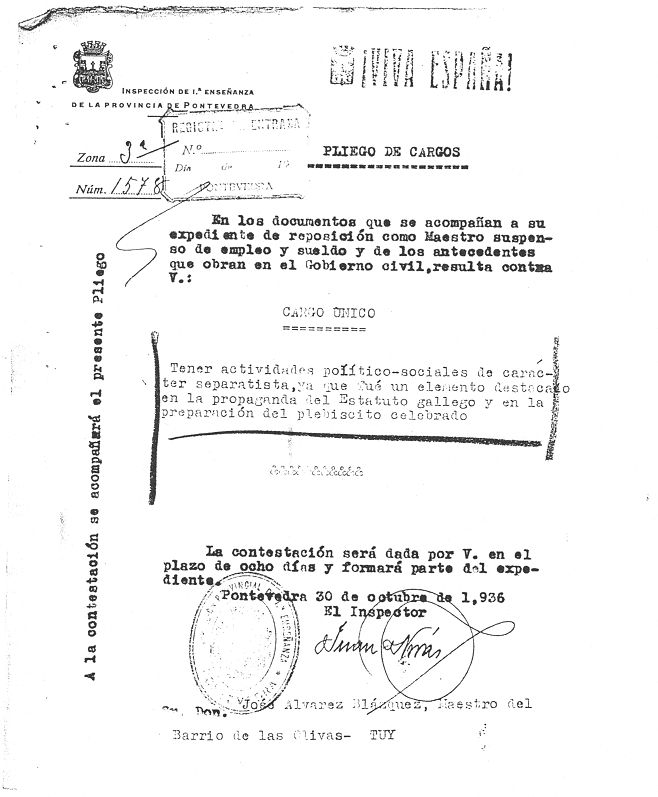
Statement of charges against José Álvarez Blázquez.

Initially, all personnel were declared dismissed and had to apply for reinstatement along with a sworn statement reporting on their own beliefs and those of their colleagues. Typically, the defences of those under investigation included fervent adherence to the Movement and attempted to minimise the significance of the reported behaviours by presenting them either as a result of pressure so that the defence of necessity could be applicable, or as tending to favour 'people of order'. The request to denounce colleagues received various responses, ranging from non-cooperation to naming individuals with whom they had personal rivalry or conflicts, and including the innocuous mention of names of notorious professors who had taken refuge in the enemy zone or were in exile. Subsequently, the commission requested reports, with those from the mayor, the parish priest, the commander of the Guardia Civil post, and a parent of proven financial solvency being mandatory. They could also request others, with reports from various military bodies and —after the Unification— from FET y de las JONS being common. As in other areas, private denunciations were common. If the purge commission considered that grounds existed, it formulated a statement of charges which the interested party had to answer within ten days, providing the relevant documentation. Typically, the accused dismissed the accusations as the product of personal quarrels and hidden interests, although this type of argument had little effect on the instructors. Non-appearance or silence of the accused was interpreted as agreement with the accusations. In light of the defence statement, the commission could order further investigations. Cases where the personal knowledge of the instructor themselves decided the issue were not lacking. Then, a proposed resolution was formulated and submitted to the Commission for Culture and Teaching. This body made the final decision, which was published in an official gazette, although it could also consider it necessary to request further reports. During this period, there was no possibility of appeal or review procedure against the final resolution. A Decree-Law of 5 December 1936 regarding the general purge of public officials had made it clear that there was no right to administrative litigation appeal against these types of resolutions. (Note: The possibility of review was established in 1938, when Pedro Sáinz Rodríguez was already Minister of National Education, who later stated that he disagreed with the intransigent actions of Enrique Suñer. Partial studies on its application show that there were many more cases where review softened sanctions than those where it aggravated them. Reasons cited include the aforementioned need for personnel, the weakness of evidence in many of the files, and the change in the course of World War II. However, regarding this latter cause, it is evident that the implementation of the possibility of reviewing the files preceded not only the turning point in the course of the world war but even its very beginning.)

It was stipulated that action should be taken as quickly as possible, and deadlines of one month were set for Commissions A, B, and C; and three months for Commission D for primary school teaching staff. However, the large volume of work and communication problems meant these deadlines were not respected at all. Evidence of the heavy workload of the commissions was the Order of 27 November 1937, which agreed that purge resolutions would henceforth be published in the provincial official bulletins due to the excessive space they occupied in the Official State Gazette.

The superior commission that made the final decision consisted of Vice President Suñer, Puigdollers, and Vegas, and it examined the various files very meticulously. Thus, the process was not only regulated but ultimately decided by a central body, so its results were not entirely arbitrary. However, the negative reports contained in the files were often not very rigorous and were based on mere rumours or prejudices, making defence difficult. When favourable and unfavourable reports conflicted, the purge commission typically heeded the latter, so the person under investigation had to seek endorsements from 'solvent' individuals as their main line of defence. The Superior Commission often mitigated the proposals of the lower commissions, if only out of the need to have sufficient teaching staff to meet service requirements. Additionally, there were notable differences in treatment due to regional disparities. The most punished provinces were the most urbanised and secularised ones that offered the greatest resistance to the Francoist advance, such as Asturias and Biscay. The former was hit harder, while in the latter there were many sanctioned individuals, but fewer were separated from service because most of those repressed were Basque nationalists who were punished with suspensions from employment and salary and/or forced transfers outside the Basque Country and Navarre.

=== Outcome ===
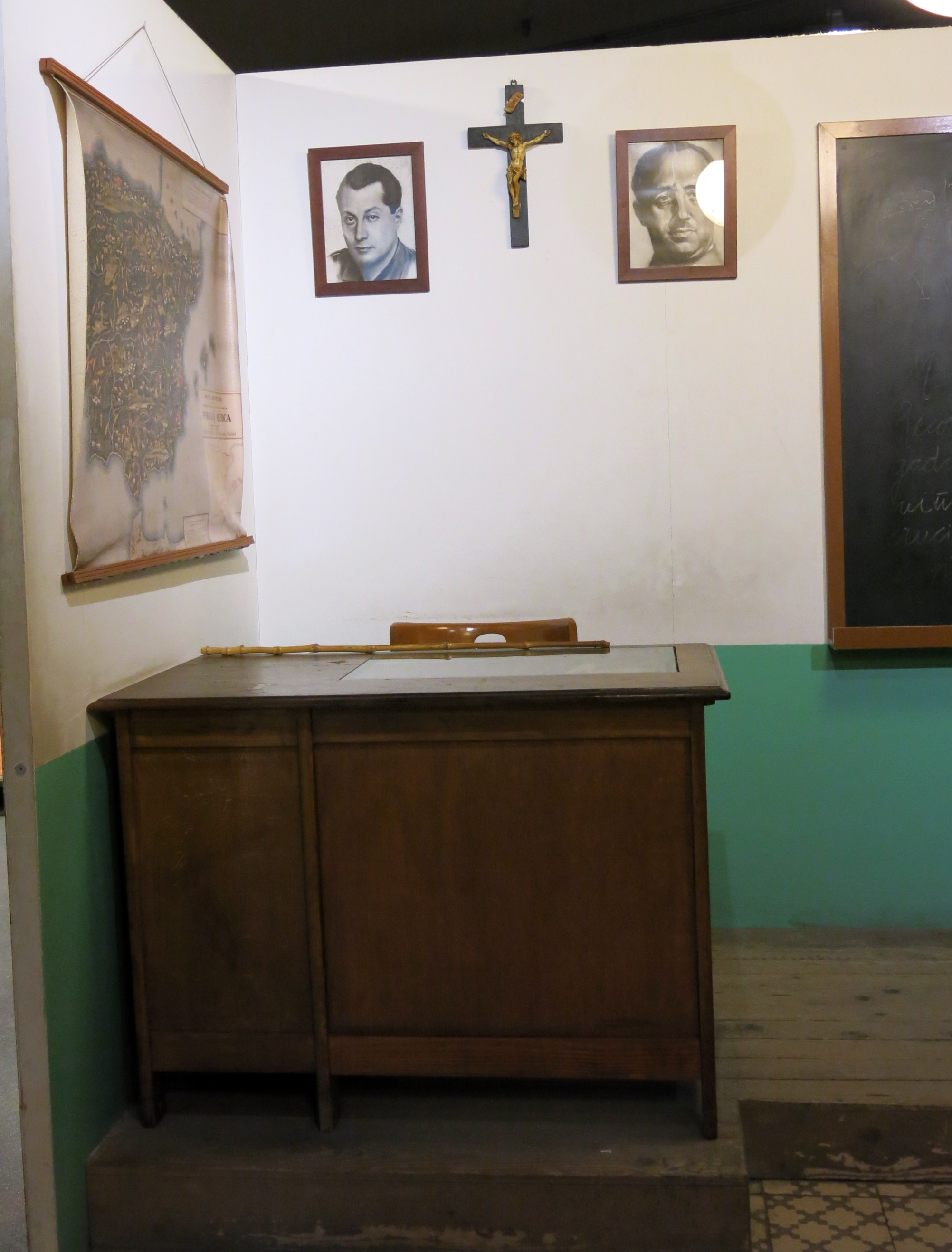
The Commission transformed educational centres, which would feature iconic presence of the Single Party and Franco himself, although always under the presidency of Catholic symbols.

It is almost impossible to know the real scope of the process due to the destruction of documents. In general terms, women were treated with less severity than men. After the disappearance of the Junta Técnica del Estado, from 1938 onwards, it became possible to review files, which somewhat softened the situation —mainly because the passage of time led to greater permissiveness— but even so, the result was a profound ideological cleansing and the replacement of purged personnel with others loyal to the new regime. (Note: In the largest sector, that of teachers and normal school students, Francisco Morente estimates from available partial data that throughout the entire process —which continued intensively after the disappearance of the Commission for Culture and Teaching at least until 1942, but continued to be applied to a lesser extent throughout the dictatorship— about 60,000 people were investigated, of whom between 15,000 and 16,000 would have been sanctioned. Of these, about 6,000 would have been permanently removed from service.)

Secondary education teachers were not a group particularly committed to the Republic, but their influence on future ruling classes was feared, so the preventive function outlined in the Order of 7 December 1936 took precedence. A total of 2,445 files have been studied, of which 672 ended in sanction. This represents 27.48% of the total, a somewhat higher percentage than that of primary school teachers. The main accusation was belonging to a leftist political party (52.49%), although the percentage of those who did not appear for the purge process (19.06%), who were automatically separated from service for "abandonment of post" under the 1857 Public Instruction Act, is also noteworthy. However, those separated from service at least had the opportunity to work in private education, an option not available to interim teachers who were disqualified from teaching (4.48%). Regarding forced transfer, it was applied preferentially to right-wing nationalists, considered 'recoverable' if removed from their original territorial sphere.

Although the purges were processed for years, the period managed by the State Technical Board saw a considerable number of punishments; 1937 was the year with the most sanctions for secondary school teaching staff. This may have been because the process was in its early stages and teachers who did not appear were dismissed relatively quickly.

In higher education, the repression was led by the university community itself. There is evidence of one hundred and sixty sanctions resulting from the purge. In this area, there were no provincial commissions, but a single Purging Commission for University Staff. This commission deprived university rectors of the significant decision-making power that had been granted to them by the National Defense Junta. Located in Zaragoza, it was presided over by the Chemistry professor Antonio de Gregorio Rocasolano, with the historian Ángel González Palencia acting as secretary. (Note: Furthermore, at least sixteen university professors were murdered or executed outside the purge process and the Commission's actions.)

The consequences of the purge went beyond the loss of employment or stigmatisation. A sanctioning resolution could negatively influence other repressive procedures initiated by the Francoist authorities. Sometimes, the same act could lead to multiple convictions. It should also not be forgotten that the creation of numerous vacancies benefited other teachers loyal to the regime who occupied the positions left vacant by the sanctioned individuals, so the repressive action was not exclusive to Franco and his political subordinates, but had the active and essential collaboration of a significant sector of the citizenry. Despite this replacement of teaching staff, the purge at certain times caused a shortage of qualified personnel that endangered the development of the academic year.

== Other actions ==
Aside from the purge, in educational matters, the Commission for Culture and Teaching continued the work already begun by the National Defense Junta of eliminating the reforms that had been implemented during the republican period. Modern pedagogy was rejected for being considered 'foreignising' and alien to Spanish practices, and there was a return to more traditional methodologies and content; the Professional Teaching Plan was repealed; both the restrictions applied to the Catholic Church and secularism were eliminated, and religious instruction was reintroduced; and bilingualism and coeducation were suppressed. Outside the purge process, reports were issued on the moral and professional conduct of teachers, and textbooks and reading books were reviewed. Certain schools and secondary schools were also closed while new centres were enabled elsewhere. In this regard, private schools were obliged to include a certain number of students with limited resources. However, little was done to develop new teaching programmes, except for appointing a commission to study the issue. Unlike primary and secondary education, where attempts were made to normalise teaching life, the universities had been closed by the National Defense Junta and remained closed for the rest of the war.

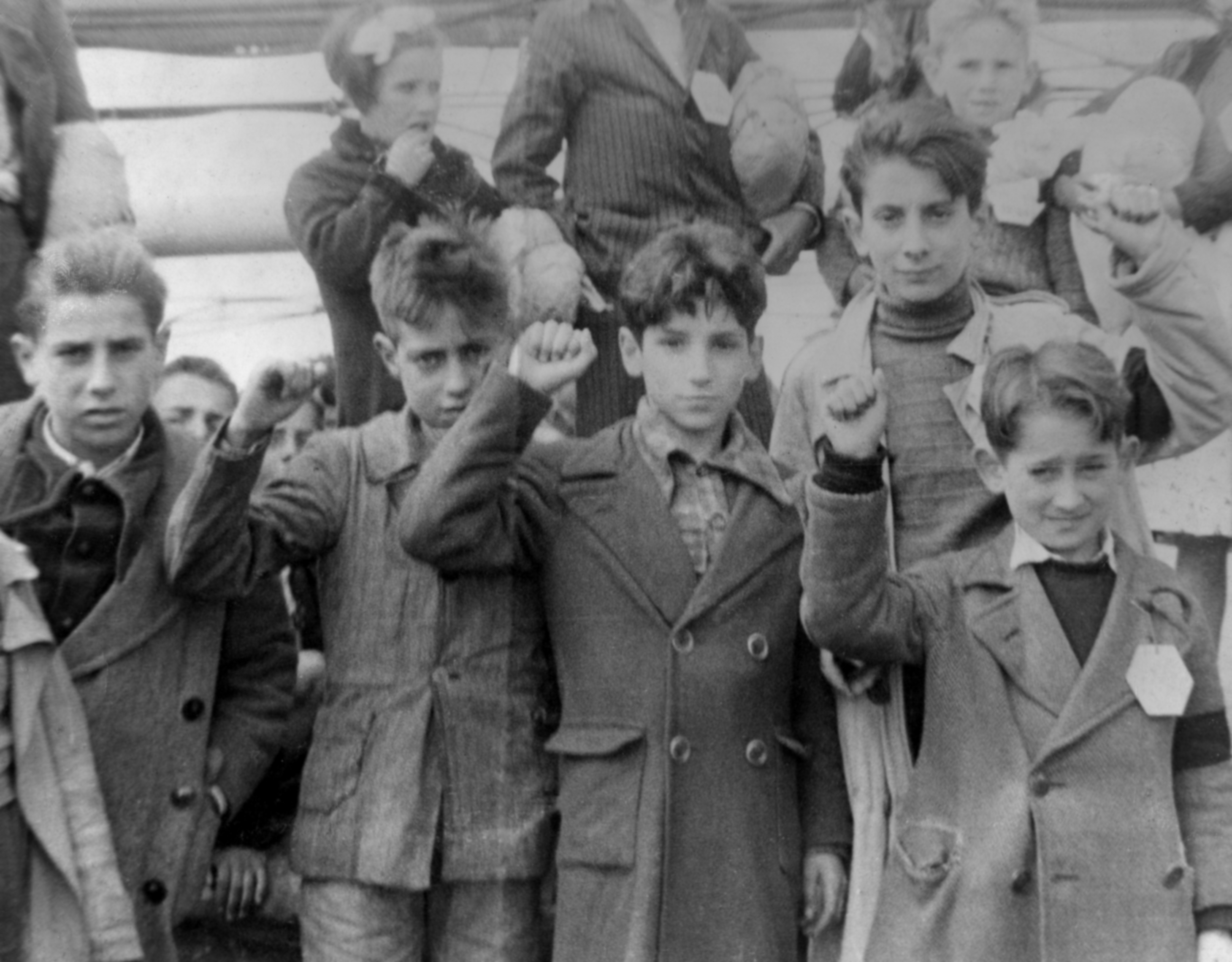
Children leaving the republican zone bound for abroad. The Commission attempted to profoundly modify education.

By decree of 1 January 1938, the Institute of Spain was created. Modelled on the Institut de France, its function was to bring together the various academies. The idea came from Eugenio d'Ors, who was appointed secretary. Manuel de Falla was designated president with the clear intention of using his prestige in service of the Francoist cause. The musician was reluctant to perform the duties of the office and managed to be excused from some of them. The new body was tasked with the development of the 'single' texts intended for teaching. It partly served to replace the defunct Junta para Ampliación de Estudios e Investigaciones Científicas (Junta for the Expansion of Studies and Scientific Research).

In the ideological sphere, an exalted and exclusionary Spanish nationalism was defended, and the History was reinterpreted with a sublimation of the period of the Catholic Monarchs and the early Habsburgs and a parallel condemnation of the Enlightenment, liberalism, and the Republic. The combative role of schools in a time of war was also promoted. In early 1937, it was ordered that all primary school classrooms have an image of the Virgin, and that those in secondary and university centres display a crucifix.

Measures were also taken for the training of teachers. In addition to them having to demonstrate their good political and religious conduct through reports from the mayor, the parish priest, and the commander of the Guardia Civil post, a regulation of 17 July 1937 approved the programme of courses for teacher training. These were two-week short courses aimed at implanting the ideology of the new regime in schools. Attendance at these was considered a merit on their service record.

In another vein, on 23 December 1936, the production, trade, and dissemination of pornographic material was prohibited, but also of "socialist, communist, libertarian and, in general, subversive literature". Texts of this type were to be kept in official libraries to be consulted only exceptionally. Strict censorship was implemented, which scrupulously followed the Index of Rome and prohibited all works politically opposed to the Movement. In many cities, there were public book burnings.

Measures aimed at the protection of the artistic heritage were taken, such as the approval of Decree 95. Provincial boards dedicated to this purpose were created, and trading in cultural goods was radically prohibited. Franco's Spain was present at the 1937 Paris International Exposition within the Vatican pavilion. There, a chapel was erected housing the altarpiece by José María Sert, Intercesión de Santa Teresa de Jesús en la guerra civil española (Intercession of Saint Teresa of Jesus in the Spanish Civil War).

The few minutes preserved from the meetings of the presidents of the Junta Técnica del Estado show that matters of little political interest were discussed. They did not address major reforms, but rather limited themselves to trying to respond to pressing needs. An exception is an intervention by Enrique Suñer on 27 March 1937, in which he expressed his desire that the study of the educational reforms he was designing be addressed soon.

== See also ==
- National Defense Junta
- José María Pemán

== Bibliography ==
- Alted Vigil, Alicia (1997). "La enseñanza en la zona franquista" [Education in the Francoist zone]. La Guerra Civil Española. 20. El nuevo Estado [The Spanish Civil War. 20. The New State]. Barcelona: Ediciones Folio. pp. 98–109. ISBN 84-413-0450-5.
- Barona Vilar, Josep Lluís (2010). El exilio científico republicano [The Republican Scientific Exile]. Valencia: Publicaciones de la University of Valencia. p. 364. ISBN 978-84-370-8479-4.
- Blasco Gil, Yolanda; Mancebo Alonso, María Fernanda (2010). Oposiciones y concursos a cátedra de historia en la universidad de Franco (1939-1950) [Competitive Examinations and Contests for History Chairs in Franco's University (1939-1950)]. Valencia: Publicaciones de la Universidad de Valencia. p. 77. ISBN 978-84-370-8684-2.
- Claret Miranda, Jaume (2006). "Cuando las cátedras eran trincheras. La depuración política e ideológica de la Universidad española durante el primer franquismo" [When the Chairs Were Trenches. The Political and Ideological Purge of the Spanish University during the Early Francoism]. Hispania Nova (6). Getafe: Carlos III University: 20. ISSN 1138-7319.
- Crozier, Brian (1969). Franco, historia y biografía I [Franco, History and Biography I]. Madrid: Magisterio Español. pp. 316–317. ISBN 84-265-7048-8.
- Jackson, Gabriel (2010). La República española y la guerra civil [The Spanish Republic and the Civil War]. Barcelona: Crítica. pp. 448–449. ISBN 978-84-08-05500-6.
- Martí Ferrándiz, José J. (2002). Poder político y educación [Political Power and Education]. Valencia: Universidad de Valencia. ISBN 84-370-5507-5.
- Morente Valero, Francisco (2001). "La muerte de una ilusión: el Magisterio español en la Guerra Civil y el primer franquismo" [The Death of an Illusion: The Spanish Teaching Profession in the Civil War and Early Francoism]. Historia y comunicación social (6). Madrid: Complutense University: 187–201. ISSN 1137-0734.
- Morente, Francisco (2001). "La depuración franquista del magisterio público. Un estado de la cuestión" [The Francoist Purge of the Public Teaching Profession. A State of the Question]. Hispania. 61 (208). Spanish National Research Council: 661–688. ISSN 0018-2141. Archived from the original on 18 November 2015.
- Navarro Cardoso, Fernando. "José María Pemán y la depuración universitaria" [José María Pemán and the University Purge]. Proyecto de investigación: La evolución de la ciencia penal española durante la Segunda República, la Guerra Civil y el "Nuevo Estado". Huelva: University of Huelva: 1–12.
- Pablo Lobo, Carlos de (2007). "La depuración de la educación española durante el franquismo (1936-1975). Institucionalización de una represión" [The Purge of Spanish Education during Francoism (1936-1975). Institutionalisation of a Repression]. Foro de Educación (9). FahrenHouse Ediciones: 203–228. ISSN 1698-7799.
- Preston, Paul (1994). Franco, «Caudillo de España» [Franco: A Biography]. Barcelona: Grijalbo. pp. 236–237. ISBN 84-253-2498-X.
- Ranzato, Gabriele (2006). El eclipse de la democracia [The Eclipse of Democracy]. Madrid: Siglo XXI. p. 508. ISBN 978-84-323-1248-9.
- Redondo, Gonzalo (1993). Historia de la Iglesia en España 1931-1939. Tomo II. La Guerra Civil (1936-1939) [History of the Church in Spain 1931-1939. Volume II. The Civil War (1936-1939)]. Madrid: Ediciones Rialp. pp. 144–151. ISBN 84-321-3016-8.
- Sanchidrián, Carmen; Grana, Isabel; Martín, Francisco (2009). "Análisis y valoración de los expedientes de depuración del profesorado de Instituto de Segunda Enseñanza en el franquismo (1936-1942). Resultados generales" [Analysis and Assessment of the Purge Files of Secondary School Teachers during Francoism (1936-1942). General Results]. Revista de Educación (356). Madrid: Ministry of Education, Culture and Sport: 377–399. ISSN 0034-8082.
- Seidman, Michael (2011). La victoria nacional [The National Victory]. Madrid: Alianza Editorial. pp. 227–241. ISBN 978-84-206-0863-1.
- Tusell, Javier (1997). "La Junta Técnica del Estado" [The State Technical Board]. La Guerra Civil Española. El avance rebelde [The Spanish Civil War. The Rebel Advance]. Barcelona: Ediciones Folio S.A. pp. 70–82. ISBN 84-413-0437-8.
- Zambrana, Patricia; Peláez, Manuel J. (2008). "Más noticias sobre la depuración política universitaria de catedráticos de Derecho en España (1936-1943) (2ª parte)" [Further News on the University Political Purge of Law Professors in Spain (1936-1943) (Part 2)]. Revista de Estudios Histórico Jurídicos (30). Valparaíso: Pontifical Catholic University of Valparaíso: 539–560. ISSN 0716-5455.
