= José María Pemán =

Spanish writer (1897–1981)

The Most Excellent José María Pemán
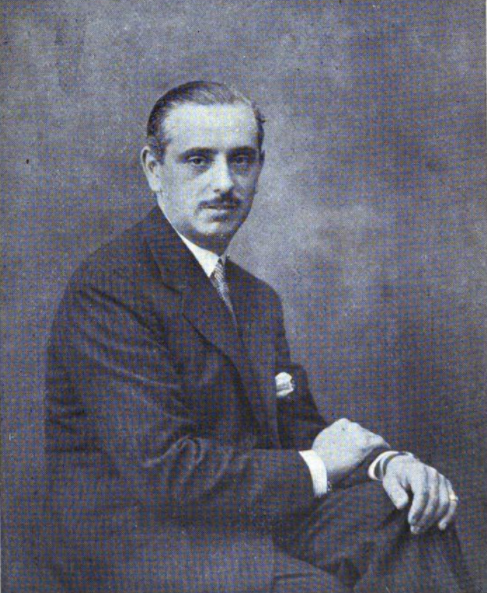
- Born: José María Pemán y Pemartín; 8 May 1897; Cádiz, Spain
- Died: 19 July 1981 (aged 84); Cádiz, Spain

Seat i of the Real Academia Española
- In office 20 December 1939 (Note: Elected on 7 December 1939) – 19 July 1981
- Preceded by: Emilio Cotarelo
- Succeeded by: José García Nieto

Director of the Real Academia Española
- In office 1 January 1938 – July 1940
- Preceded by: Ramón Menéndez Pidal
- Succeeded by: Francisco Rodríguez Marín
- In office 7 December 1944 – December 1947
- Preceded by: Miguel Asín Palacios
- Succeeded by: Ramón Menéndez Pidal

José María Pemán y Pemartín (8 May 1897 – 19 July 1981) was a Spanish journalist, poet, playwright, novelist, essayist and monarchist intellectual. He was a member of Francisco Franco's Falange movement.

== Biography ==
José María Pemán y Pemartín was born on 8 May 1897 in Cádiz. His father, Juan Gualberto Pemán was an important deputy of the Conservative Party for El Puerto de Santa María, and his mother, María Pemartín, came from a wealthy family from Jerez. Originally a student of law, he received his doctorate on Plato from Madrid University. He had a brief spell as a criminal lawyer which he discontinued in 1924 following accusations of "a serious irregularity". He entered the literary world with a series of poetic works inspired by his native Andalusia (De la vida sencilla, A la rueda, rueda, El barrio de Santa Cruz, and Las flores del bien). In August 1927, Pemán was made a knight of the Orden de Montesa by King Alfonso XIII. In the 1930s he became a journalist. He was elected to seat i of the Real Academia Española on 7 December 1939, taking it on 20 December. He was the director of the royal academy from 1939 to 1940 and 1944 to 1947.

Pemán often blurred literary genres, and developed a unique style that may be described as equidistant between classicism and modernism, not unfamiliar to readers of ABC and El Alcázar.

As a dramatist, he wrote historical-religious verse (El divino impaciente and Cuando las Cortes de Cádiz y Cisneros), plays based on Andalusian themes (Noche de levante en calma), and comical costume dramas (Julieta y Romeo and El viento sobre la tierra).

Pemán adapted many classical works (including Antigone, Hamlet, and Oedipus). He displayed his narrative skill in a series of novels and short stories (including Historia del fantasma y doña Juanita, Cuentos sin importancia, and La novela de San Martín). He was also a noted essayist.

In 1955 he received the Mariano de Cavia prize for journalism. In 1957, he won the March de Literatura prize. He was the personal advisor to the Count of Barcelona from 1969 until the title's dissolution. In 1981, two months before his death, he was named Knight of the Order of the Golden Fleece by King Juan Carlos.

Pemán was one of the few prominent intellectuals to support Francisco Franco and the Falangist movement. Franco named Pemán as head of commission on education, during which time Pemán purged 16,000 teachers, many of whom were sent to prison and hundreds of whom were ordered to be executed. This ensured his professional success during and after the Civil War, and also damaged his international reputation.

Pemán wrote a set of unofficial, popular lyrics for the Marcha Real, which Franco had reinstated as Spain's national anthem in 1939 in its original form as a purely instrumental piece, despite some popular misapprehensions concerning the official status of Eduardo Marquina's lyrics. Despite never being published in the BOE (Official State Bulletin), Pemán's lyrics continued in use after Franco's death by a few who remained nostalgic for the Franco era during the period of the transition to a democracy.

Across his life, Pemán wrote over 65 plays, 15 poetry books, 30 novels and political works, many press columns, and delivered hundreds of public speeches and lectures.

== Pemán and antisemitism under Franco ==
Pemán was a supporter of the Jewish-Masonic-Bolshevist Conspiracy (Spanish: contubernio judeo-masonico-bolchevique), a conspiracy theory based on the antisemitic Protocols of the Elders of Zion. Writing about Pemán's influence on the political culture and climate of Spain in the lead-up to the Civil War, historian Paul Preston said "His writings and speeches between the mid-1920s and the mid-1930s contributed massively to the breakdown of political coexistence that was the prelude to civil war. His virulent propaganda campaigns during the war encouraged and justified the savage repression unleashed by Francoist forces."

In a 1937 radio address, Pemán evoked the purity of the blood, statutes of blood purity that were the legal discrimination mechanism used against Jews, Muslims and other non-Christians by the Spanish Inquisition, in which Pemán called the Spanish civil war a "magnificent struggle to bleed Spain."

Pemán's Poema de la bestia y el angel (1938), considered his most influential work, drew on the antisemitic Protocol of the Elders of Zion. In it, according to Isabella Rohr, Pemán vilified Margarita Nelken, an art critic and Socialist deputy whose parents were Jewish immigrants, writing:

Oh, cursed, cursed
You, the Hebrew
You, unmarried mother: Margarita!
Name of a flower and spirit of a hyena.

== Selected filmography ==
- Romeo and Juliet (1940)
- Lola Montes (1944)
- Madness for Love (1948)
- The Duchess of Benameji (1949)
- The Captain from Loyola (1949)
- Congress in Seville (1955)

== See also ==
- Comisión de Cultura y Enseñanza
