= Enrique Suñer Ordóñez =

Spanish pediatrician (1878–1941)

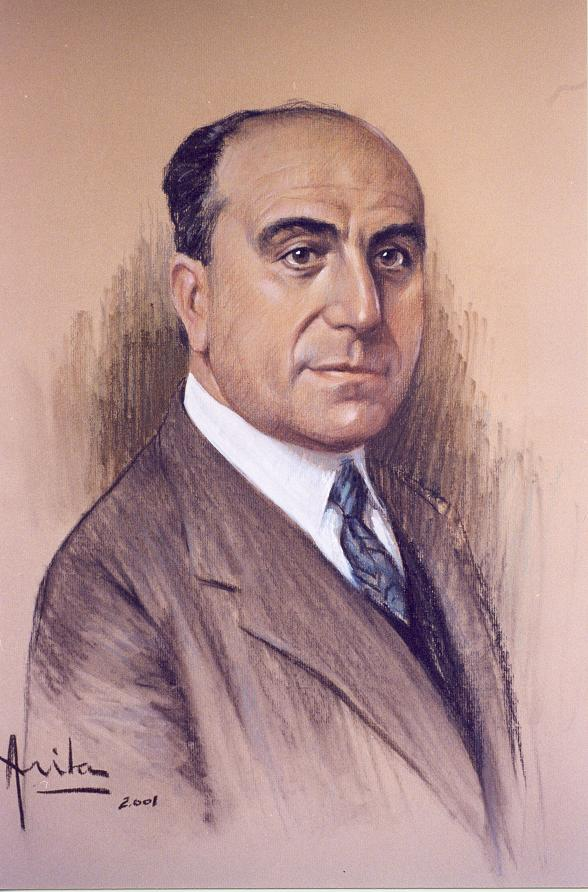

Enrique Suñer Ordóñez (1878–1941) was a Spanish professor of pediatric medicine at the University of Madrid and administrator in the Franco government.

He was vice president of the Education and culture committee of Franco's first government. He was subsequently appointed president of the Comisión Liquidadora de Responsabilidades Políticas where he oversaw an anti-intellectual purging of schoolteachers and denouncing of leading intellectuals such as Ramón Menéndez Pidal, María Goyri, and many others. The enormous backlog of cases he sent to the Commission led to dysfunction, and his eventual replacement in 1940 by Wenceslao Gonzalez Oliveros.

== Publications ==
- Los intectuales y la tragedia española, Editorial Española, 1938

== See also ==
- Comisión de Cultura y Enseñanza
