= Roberto Cantalupo =

Italian politician (1891–1975)

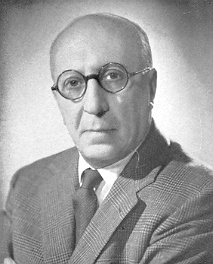
- Roberto Cantalupo on the IV legislature

Personal details
- Born: January 17, 1891 Naples, Italy
- Died: November 13, 1975 (aged 84) Rome, Italy
- Education: Degree in Law
- Occupation: Politician, diplomat, essayist

Roberto Cantalupo (17 January 1891 – 13 November 1975) was an Italian politician, diplomat and essayist.

He was a leading figure during the Fascist era and later in the post-war Republic, he served as undersecretary of State at the Ministry of the Colonies between 1924 and 1926, ambassador to Egypt, Brazil and Spain of Franco, and later as a member of the Italian Chamber of Deputies for four legislatures.

== Biography ==
Cantalupo graduated in law and in 1922 became editor-in-chief of the newspaper of the Italian Nationalist Association, L’Idea Nazionale.

=== Under fascism ===
He joined the National Fascist Party in 1923, and in the 1924 elections he was elected to the Parliament of the Kingdom of Italy on the Fascist list (Lista Nazionale). He was confirmed again in the 1929 Italian general election and kept his seat until 1934.

From July 1924 to November 1926 he served as Undersecretary at the Ministry of the Colonies.

In 1927 he founded Oltremare, a periodical he directed himself.

Entering the diplomatic career, he became plenipotentiary minister in Egypt in 1930, and in 1932 he was appointed Italian ambassador to Brazil.

After the outbreak of the Spanish Civil War in 1936, he was sent to Spain, and in early 1937 he was appointed ambassador to Francoist Spain, although Mussolini initially considered Roberto Farinacci for the post.

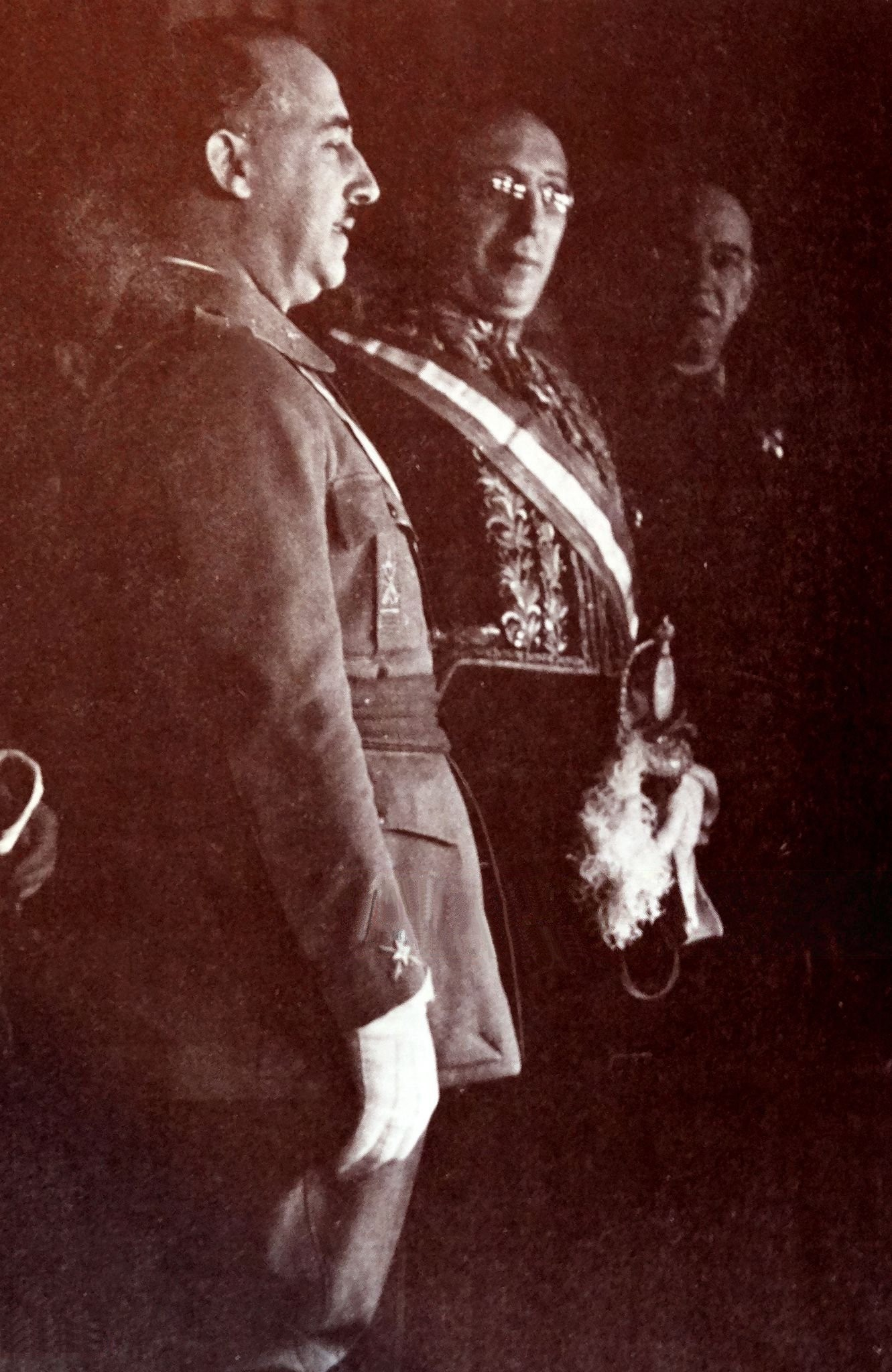
Franco and Roberto Cantalupo in Salamanca, 1937

Cantalupo had a low opinion of Franco, whom he considered “glacial, feminine and elusive”.

He was removed from the position shortly after the Battle of Guadalajara in April 1937, and left the diplomatic service in July of the same year. According to historian Stanley Payne, Cantalupo was not a radical fascist. He was recalled when he denied the Francoist insurgents' short-term prospects of victory in the Spanish Civil War. Payne judges that Cantalupo, as a fascist in the sense of the nationalist program of Italian fascism, saw himself as modern and progressive and therefore looked down with disdain on the "reactionary" and "clerical" Francoists, the Falange, Franco himself, and the Ejército Nacional commanded by him.

In 1941 he was appointed commissioner of the Italian Overseas Labour Credit Institute.

=== Post-war period ===
After the war, Cantalupo published several memoirs and collaborated with the weekly magazine Candido.

Returning to politics, he was elected to the Italian Chamber of Deputies for four consecutive legislatures, for the National Monarchist Party (1953–1961), and later for the Italian Liberal Party (1961–1972)

== Works ==
- Fatti europei e politica italiana, 1922-1924, Imperia, 1924
- L'Italia musulmana, Casa Editrice Italia d'Oltremare, 1929
- Racconti politici dell'altra pace, Istituto per gli Studi di Politica internazionale, 1940
- Fuad: primo re d'Egitto, Garzanti, 1940
- Gli americani in Africa e l'interesse degli europei, Le Monnier, 1943
- Fu la Spagna: ambasciata presso Franco, febbraio-aprile 1937, A. Mondadori, 1948
- Liberali, cattolici, socialisti, E. Roberto Cantalupo, 1964
- La "belle époque" diplomatica italiana, Editrice Can, 1965
- Liberale a destra, a destra da liberale, G. Volpe editore, 1975.
