= National Defense Junta =

1936 nationalist government in Spain

National Defense Junta Junta de Defensa Nacional
- Military junta
- Flag of the National Defense Junta
- Formation: 24 July 1936
- Extinction: 30 September 1936
- Country: Nationalist Spain

Executive branch
- President: Miguel Cabanellas
- Head of state: Francisco Franco
- Headquarters: Burgos

The Junta de Defensa Nacional (English: National Defense Junta) was a military junta which governed the territories held by the Nationalist faction of the Spanish Civil War from July to September 1936. The junta's president was Miguel Cabanellas and its head of state was Francisco Franco. The junta was dissolved when Franco was proclaimed caudillo of Spain.

== History ==
On 18 July 1936, right-wing military officers staged a coup against the Second Spanish Republic, however, the coup failed and began the Spanish Civil War. On 25 July, the leaders of the Nationalist faction, which instigated the attempted coup, declared the establishment of the National Defense Junta.

The junta held a meeting on 21 November to resolve disputed within the Nationalist faction on who their ultimate leader will be. Several of the junta's leaders, including President Miguel Cabanellas, Head of State Francisco Franco, Emilio Mola, Gonzalo Queipo de Llano, attended the meeting and were all candidates to become the faction's sole leader. Additionally, Nicolás Franco, José Millán-Astray, Luis Bolín, and José Antonio Sangróniz were in attendance to support Franco's bid to become the sole leader of the Nationalists. Eventually, Franco was proclaimed as the supreme caudillo of Spain by Decree Number 138 on 30 September 1936 and the National Defense Junta was dissolved. Cabanellas opposed Franco's rise as the Nationalists' sole leader, telling his fellow generals, "if you give him [Franco] Spain, he is going to believe that it is his and he will not allow anyone to replace him in the war or after it, until his death." The National Defense Junta was replaced by the Technical Junta of the State.

== See also ==
- National Defense Council
- Junta Técnica del Estado
- Comisión de Cultura y Enseñanza
