= List of deputy prime ministers of Spain =

The Deputy Prime Minister of Spain, Vice President of the Government or First Deputy Prime Minister (when there is more than one deputy prime minister) is the second highest position in the Government of Spain. Between 1840 and 1934 the title was Vice President of the Council of Ministers. Since its creation, there have been twenty-one deputy prime ministers.

== List of officeholders ==
Office name:

- Vice Presidency of the Council of Ministers (1840–1841; 1925–1931; 1933–1934)
- Vice Presidency of the Government (1938–1939; 1962–1973; 1982–1995; 2011–2020)
- First Vice Presidency of the Government (1974–1975; 1976; 1977–1979; 1981–1982; 1996–2011; 2020–present)
- Vice Presidency of the Government for Defence Affairs (1975–1976)
- First Vice Presidency of the Government for Defence Affairs (1976–1977)
- First Vice Presidency of the Government, in charge of the Coordination of the Security and National Defence Affairs (1979–1981)
- Vice Presidency of the Government for Economic Affairs (1982; 2011)

Portrait	Name (Birth–Death)	Term of office			Party	Government	Prime Minister (Tenure)	Ref.
Portrait	Name (Birth–Death)	Took office	Left office	Duration	Party	Government	Prime Minister (Tenure)	Ref.
	Joaquín María Ferrer (1777–1861)	3 October 1840	10 May 1841	219 days	Progressive (Esparterist)	Espartero II	Baldomero Espartero (1840–1841)	
Office disestablished during this interval.
	Severiano Martínez Anido (1862–1938)	3 December 1925	30 January 1930	4 years and 58 days	Military	Civil Directory	Miguel Primo de Rivera (1923–1930)	
Office disestablished during this interval.
	Diego Martínez Barrio (1883–1962)	22 December 1933	3 March 1934	71 days	PRR	Lerroux II	Alejandro Lerroux (1933–1934)	
Office disestablished during this interval.
	Francisco Gómez-Jordana (1876–1944)	31 January 1938	9 August 1939	1 year and 190 days	National; Movement (Military)	Franco I	Francisco Franco (1938–1973)	
Office disestablished during this interval.
	Agustín Muñoz Grandes (1896–1970)	11 July 1962	28 July 1967	5 years and 17 days	National; Movement (Military)	Franco VI	Francisco Franco (1938–1973)	
	Agustín Muñoz Grandes (1896–1970)	11 July 1962	28 July 1967	5 years and 17 days	National; Movement (Military)	Franco VII	Francisco Franco (1938–1973)	
	Luis Carrero Blanco (1904–1973)	22 September 1967	9 June 1973	5 years and 260 days	National; Movement (Military)	Franco VII	Francisco Franco (1938–1973)	
	Luis Carrero Blanco (1904–1973)	22 September 1967	9 June 1973	5 years and 260 days	National; Movement (Military)	Franco VIII	Francisco Franco (1938–1973)	
	Torcuato Fernández-Miranda (1915–1980)	12 June 1973	31 December 1973	202 days	National; Movement (Nonpartisan)	Carrero Blanco	Luis Carrero Blanco (1973)	
	José García Hernández (1915–2000)	4 January 1974	12 December 1975	1 year and 342 days	National; Movement (Nonpartisan)	Arias Navarro I	Carlos Arias Navarro (1973–1976)	
	Fernando de Santiago (1910–1994)	12 December 1975	5 July 1976	286 days	National; Movement (Military)	Arias Navarro II	Carlos Arias Navarro (1973–1976)	
	Fernando de Santiago (1910–1994)	8 July 1975	23 September 1976	286 days	National; Movement (Military)	Suárez I	Adolfo Suárez (1976–1981)	
	Manuel Gutiérrez Mellado (1912–1995)	23 September 1976	5 July 1977	4 years and 157 days	National; Movement (Military)	Suárez I	Adolfo Suárez (1976–1981)	
	Manuel Gutiérrez Mellado (1912–1995)	5 July 1977	6 April 1979	4 years and 157 days	Military	Suárez II	Adolfo Suárez (1976–1981)	
	Manuel Gutiérrez Mellado (1912–1995)	6 April 1979	27 February 1981	4 years and 157 days	Military	Suárez III	Adolfo Suárez (1976–1981)	
	Rodolfo Martín Villa (born 1934)	2 December 1981	30 July 1982	240 days	UCD	Calvo-Sotelo	Leopoldo Calvo-Sotelo (1981–1982)	
	Juan Antonio García Díez (1940–1998)	30 July 1982	3 December 1982	126 days	UCD	Calvo-Sotelo	Leopoldo Calvo-Sotelo (1981–1982)	
	Alfonso Guerra (born 1940)	3 December 1982	26 July 1986	8 years and 42 days	PSOE	González I	Felipe González (1982–1996)	
	Alfonso Guerra (born 1940)	26 July 1986	7 December 1989	8 years and 42 days	PSOE	González II	Felipe González (1982–1996)	
	Alfonso Guerra (born 1940)	7 December 1989	14 January 1991	8 years and 42 days	PSOE	González III	Felipe González (1982–1996)	
	Narcís Serra (born 1943)	13 March 1991	14 July 1993	4 years and 111 days	PSC–PSOE	González III	Felipe González (1982–1996)	
	Narcís Serra (born 1943)	14 July 1993	2 July 1995	4 years and 111 days	PSC–PSOE	González IV	Felipe González (1982–1996)	
Office disestablished during this interval.
	Francisco Álvarez-Cascos (born 1947)	6 May 1996	28 April 2000	3 years and 358 days	PP	Aznar I	José María Aznar (1996–2004)	
	Mariano Rajoy (born 1955)	28 April 2000	4 September 2003	3 years and 129 days	PP	Aznar II	José María Aznar (1996–2004)	
	Rodrigo Rato (born 1949)	4 September 2003	18 April 2004	227 days	PP	Aznar II	José María Aznar (1996–2004)	
	María Teresa Fernández de la Vega (born 1949)	18 April 2004	14 April 2008	6 years and 186 days	Independent	Zapatero I	José Luis; Rodríguez Zapatero (2004–2011)	
	María Teresa Fernández de la Vega (born 1949)	14 April 2008	21 October 2010	6 years and 186 days	Independent	Zapatero II	José Luis; Rodríguez Zapatero (2004–2011)	
	Alfredo Pérez Rubalcaba (1951–2019)	21 October 2010	12 July 2011	264 days	PSOE	Zapatero II	José Luis; Rodríguez Zapatero (2004–2011)	
	Elena Salgado (born 1949)	12 July 2011	22 December 2011	163 days	Independent	Zapatero II	José Luis; Rodríguez Zapatero (2004–2011)	
	Soraya Sáenz de Santamaría (born 1971)	22 December 2011	4 November 2016	6 years and 167 days	PP	Rajoy I	Mariano Rajoy (2011–2018)	
	Soraya Sáenz de Santamaría (born 1971)	4 November 2016	7 June 2018	6 years and 167 days	PP	Rajoy II	Mariano Rajoy (2011–2018)	
	Carmen Calvo (born 1957)	7 June 2018	13 January 2020	3 years and 35 days	PSOE	Sánchez I	Pedro Sánchez (2018–present)	
	Carmen Calvo (born 1957)	13 January 2020	12 July 2021	3 years and 35 days	PSOE	Sánchez II	Pedro Sánchez (2018–present)	
	Nadia Calviño (born 1968)	12 July 2021	21 November 2023	2 years and 170 days	Independent	Sánchez II	Pedro Sánchez (2018–present)	
	Nadia Calviño (born 1968)	21 November 2023	29 December 2023	2 years and 170 days	Independent	Sánchez III	Pedro Sánchez (2018–present)	
	María Jesús Montero (born 1966)	29 December 2023	27 March 2026	2 years and 88 days	PSOE	Sánchez III	Pedro Sánchez (2018–present)	
	Carlos Cuerpo (born 1980)	27 March 2026	Incumbent	208 days	Independent	Sánchez III	Pedro Sánchez (2018–present)	

== See also ==
- Deputy Prime Minister of Spain
- Prime Minister of Spain
- List of Spanish monarchs
- List of heads of state of Spain
- President of the Republic (Spain)
- List of Spanish regents
