= First government of Adolfo Suárez =

Spanish government led by Adolfo Suárez from 1976 to 1977

1st government of Adolfo Suárez
- Government of Spain
- 1976–1977
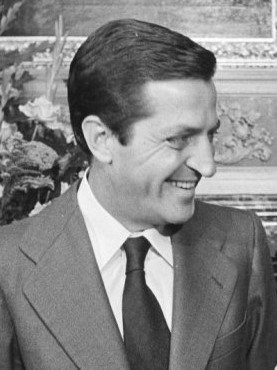
- Suárez in August 1977
- Date formed: 8 July 1976
- Date dissolved: 5 July 1977

People and organisations
- Head of state: Juan Carlos I
- Prime Minister: Adolfo Suárez
- Deputy Prime Ministers: First: Fernando de Santiago (1976); Manuel Gutiérrez Mellado (1976–1977); Second: Alfonso Osorio
- No. of ministers: 19 (Note: Does not include the prime minister.)
- Total no. of members: 22
- Member party: FET–JONS (1976–1977); UCD (1977)
- Status in legislature: One-party state (1976–1977); Dominant-party (1977)

History
- Legislature term: 10th Cortes Españolas
- Budget: 1977
- Predecessor: Arias Navarro II
- Successor: Suárez II

The first government of Adolfo Suárez was formed on 8 July 1976, following the latter's appointment as prime minister of Spain by King Juan Carlos I on 3 July and his swearing-in on 5 July, as a result of Carlos Arias Navarro's resignation from the post on 1 July 1976. It succeeded the second Arias Navarro government and was the government of Spain from 8 July 1976 to 5 July 1977, a total of 362 days, or 11 months and 27 days.

Suárez's first cabinet comprised members from the National Movement (with the notable absences of FET y de las JONS and the Opus Dei), but also by members of the reformist 'Tácito' group, a number of political associations that could not yet be legalized as parties—such as the Spanish People's Union (UDPE) and the Spanish Democratic Union (UDE)—and the Federation of Independent Studies (FEDISA) political society. Following the death of dictator Francisco Franco, the regulations of the Cortes Españolas had been amended to allow legislators to group into parliamentary factions, one of whom—the Independent Parliamentary Group (GPI), which would later become the Independent Social Federation (FSI) party—being represented in the Council of Ministers through Rodolfo Martín Villa.

On 7 April 1977, the National Movement and the FET y de las JONS party were officially disbanded, and many cabinet members—who had gone their own separate ways to a number of political parties ahead of the 1977 general election—joined into the nascent Union of the Democratic Centre (UCD) electoral alliance under Suárez's leadership upon its formation in May 1977.

== Cabinet changes ==
Suárez's first government saw a number of cabinet changes during its tenure:

- On 23 September 1976, Fernando de Santiago was replaced as First Deputy Prime Minister by Manuel Gutiérrez Mellado.
- Minister of the Navy Gabriel Pita da Veiga announced his resignation on 12 April 1977 over personal disagreements with the government's decision to legalize the Communist Party of Spain (PCE) on 9 April; he was replaced by Admiral Pascual Pery on 15 April.
- On 23 April 1977, Leopoldo Calvo-Sotelo resigned as Minister of Public Works in order to organize the newly-formed Union of the Democratic Centre (UCD) ahead of the 1977 Spanish general election. Carlos Pérez de Bricio took on the ordinary duties of the affairs of the ministry until Calvo-Sotelo's successor, Luis Ortiz González, could take office on 11 May 1977.

== Council of Ministers ==
The Council of Ministers was structured into the offices for the prime minister, the two deputy prime ministers and 19 ministries, including one minister without portfolio.

← Suárez I Government → (8 July 1976 – 5 July 1977)
Portfolio	Name	Party	Took office	Left office	Ref.
Prime Minister	Adolfo Suárez	FET–JONS^{/UDPE} (Note: Remained in the cabinet as an unaligned independent after UDPE merged into AP in October 1976.)	5 July 1976	17 June 1977	
First Deputy Prime Minister; Minister without portfolio	Fernando de Santiago	Military	8 July 1976	23 September 1976	
Second Deputy Prime Minister; Minister of the Presidency	Alfonso Osorio	FET–JONS^{/UDE}	8 July 1976	5 July 1977	
Minister of Foreign Affairs	Marcelino Oreja	FET–JONS^{/Tácito}	8 July 1976	5 July 1977	
Minister of Justice	Landelino Lavilla	FET–JONS^{/Tácito}	8 July 1976	5 July 1977	
Minister of the Army	Félix Álvarez-Arenas	Military	8 July 1976	5 July 1977	
Minister of the Navy	Gabriel Pita da Veiga	Military	8 July 1976	15 April 1977	
Minister of Finance	Eduardo Carriles	FET–JONS^{/UDE}	8 July 1976	5 July 1977	
Minister of Governance	Rodolfo Martín Villa	FET–JONS^{/GPI}	8 July 1976	5 July 1977	
Minister of Public Works	Leopoldo Calvo-Sotelo	FET–JONS^{/FEDISA}	8 July 1976	23 April 1977	
Minister of Education and Science	Aurelio Menéndez	FET–JONS^{/NP}	8 July 1976	5 July 1977	
Minister of Labour	Álvaro Rengifo	FET–JONS^{/NP}	8 July 1976	5 July 1977	
Minister of Industry	Carlos Pérez de Bricio	FET–JONS^{/FEDISA}	8 July 1976	5 July 1977	
Minister of the Air	Carlos Franco Iribarnegaray	Military	8 July 1976	5 July 1977	
Minister of Agriculture	Fernando Abril Martorell	FET–JONS^{/UDPE}	8 July 1976	5 July 1977	
Minister Secretary-General of the Movement	Ignacio García López	FET–JONS^{/UDPE}	8 July 1976	7 April 1977	
Minister of Trade	José Lladó	FET–JONS^{/UDPE}	8 July 1976	5 July 1977	
Minister of Information and Tourism	Andrés Reguera	FET–JONS^{/UDE}	8 July 1976	5 July 1977	
Minister of Housing	Francisco Lozano Vicente	FET–JONS^{/NP}	8 July 1976	5 July 1977	
Minister for Trade Union Relations	Enrique de la Mata	FET–JONS^{/UDE}	8 July 1976	5 July 1977	
=== Changes September 1976 ===
Portfolio	Name	Faction	Took office	Left office	Ref.
First Deputy Prime Minister for Defence Affairs (Note: Following Fernando de Santiago's dismissal as First Deputy Prime Minister on 23 September 1976, the post was rebranded as the post of the First Deputy Prime Minister for Defence Affairs.); Minister without portfolio	Manuel Gutiérrez Mellado	Military	23 September 1976	5 July 1977	
=== Changes April 1977 ===
Portfolio	Name	Faction	Took office	Left office	Ref.
Minister of the Navy	Pascual Pery	Military	15 April 1977	5 July 1977	
Minister of Public Works	Carlos Pérez de Bricio took on the ordinary discharge of duties from 23 April to 11 May 1977.				
Minister of Public Works	Luis Ortiz González	Independent	11 May 1977	5 July 1977	
Minister Secretary of the Government (Note: On 7 April 1977, the Minister Secretary-General of the Movement was reorganized as the Minister Secretary of the Government.)	Ignacio García López	Independent	7 April 1977	5 July 1977	

== Bibliography ==
- T. Powell, Charles (1990). "The 'Tácito' group and Spain's transition to democracy, 1973-1977" (PDF). In Lannon, Frances; Preston, Paul (eds.). Élites and Power in Twentieth-Century Spain: Essays in Honour of Sir Raymond Carr. Clarendon Press, University of Oxford. pp. 249–268. ISBN 978-0198228806.
- Fernández-Miranda Lozana, Pilar (1994). La Reforma Política (Contribución a la historia de la Transición) (PDF) (Thesis) (in Spanish). Complutense University of Madrid.
- T. Powell, Charles (1997). "Crisis del franquismo, reformismo y transición a la democracia" (PDF). In Tusell Gómez, Javier; Montero García, Feliciano; Marín Arce, José María (eds.). Las derechas en la España contemporánea (in Spanish). Anthropos. pp. 247–270. ISBN 84-7658-524-1.
- Rodríguez Teruel, Juan (2004–2005). Los Ministros de la España democrática. Perfil, trayectorias y carrera ministerial de los miembros de Suárez a Zapatero (1976-2005) (PDF) (Thesis) (in Spanish). Autonomous University of Barcelona.
- Ruiz Carnicer, Miguel Ángel (2013). "La Unión del Pueblo Español (UDPE): los orígenes de la macro-asociación azul de Alianza Popular (AP)" (PDF). Falange, las culturas políticas del fascismo en la España de Franco (1936-1975) (in Spanish). Autonomous University of Barcelona. pp. 499–514. ISBN 978-84-9911-216-9.

Preceded by Arias Navarro II	Government of Spain; 1976–1977	Succeeded by Suárez II
