= Second government of Carlos Arias Navarro =

2nd government of Carlos Arias Navarro
- Government of Spain
- 1975–1976
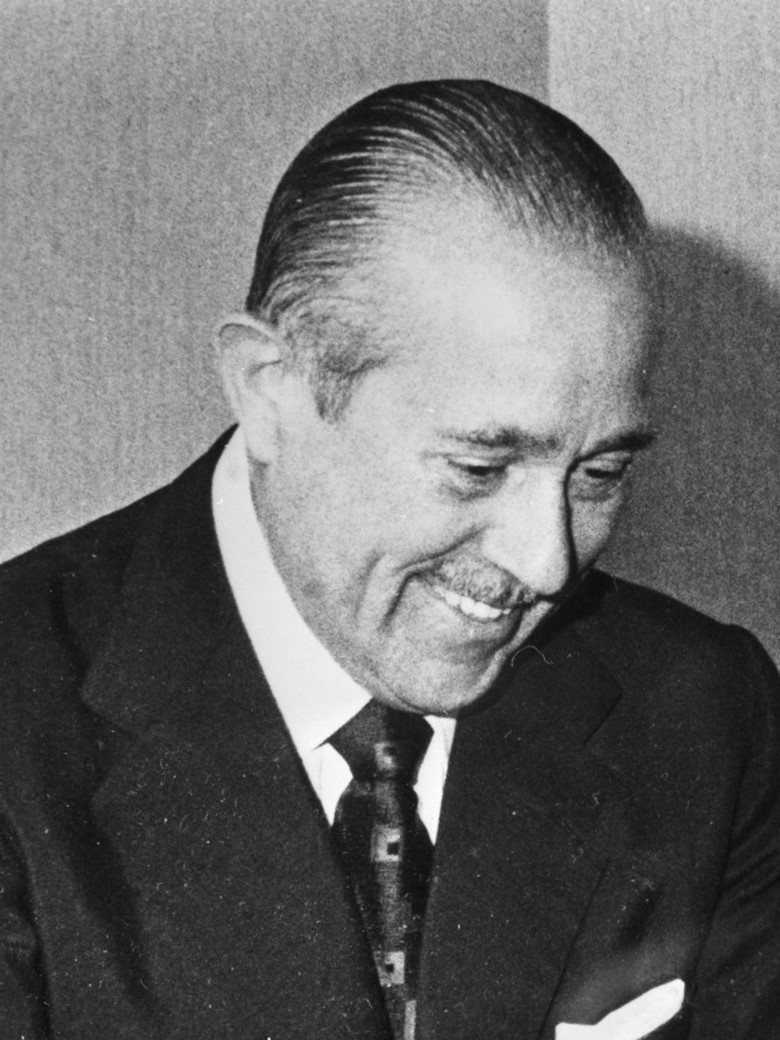
- Arias Navarro in October 1975
- Date formed: 12 December 1975
- Date dissolved: 5 July 1976

People and organisations
- Monarch: Juan Carlos I
- Prime Minister: Carlos Arias Navarro (1975–1976); Fernando de Santiago (1976; acting)
- Deputy Prime Ministers: First: Fernando de Santiago; Second: Manuel Fraga; Third: Juan Miguel Villar Mir
- No. of ministers: 20 (Note: Does not include the prime minister.) (1975–1976); 19 (1976)
- Total no. of members: 20
- Member party: FET–JONS
- Status in legislature: One-party state

History
- Legislature term: 10th Cortes Españolas
- Budget: 1976
- Predecessor: Arias Navarro I
- Successor: Suárez I

The second government of Carlos Arias Navarro was formed on 12 December 1975, following the latter's confirmation as prime minister of Spain by King Juan Carlos I on 5 December, as a result of his enthronement as the new head of state of Spain following dictator Francisco Franco's death on 20 November 1975. It succeeded the first Arias Navarro government and was the government of Spain from 12 December 1975 to 5 July 1976, a total of 206 days, or 6 months and 23 days.

Arias Navarro's second cabinet was the first to serve under the restored monarchy of Spain, and was made up of members from the National Movement (which comprised the FET y de las JONS—the only legal political party during the Francoist regime—the military and aligned-nonpartisan figures from the civil service), but would also see the incorporation of members from legal associations, societies and groups—not yet political parties—such as Manuel Fraga's Federation of Independent Studies (FEDISA), the Spanish People's Union (UDPE) and the Spanish Democratic Union (UDE). Further, the death of Franco would see amendments in the regulations of the Cortes Españolas that would allow legislators to group into parliamentary factions, with one such faction, the Independent Parliamentary Group (GPI), being also present in the government through the figure of Rodolfo Martín Villa.

Proving incapable of adapting to the coming changes and reluctant to democratize the regime, Arias Navarro would submit his resignation as prime minister on 1 July 1976. In accordance with the legal provisions within the Organic Law of the State, the cabinet remained in place with Deputy Prime Minister Fernando de Santiago as acting prime minister until the appointment of Adolfo Suárez a few days later, with all ministers being automatically dismissed upon the election of the new prime minister.

== Council of Ministers ==
The Council of Ministers was structured into the offices for the prime minister, the three deputy prime ministers and 20 ministries, including one minister without portfolio.

← Arias Navarro II Government → (12 December 1975 – 5 July 1976)
Portfolio	Name	Party	Took office	Left office	Ref.
Prime Minister	Carlos Arias Navarro	FET–JONS^{/NP}	5 December 1975	1 July 1976	
Deputy Prime Minister for Defence Affairs; Minister without portfolio	Fernando de Santiago	Military	12 December 1975	5 July 1976	
Deputy Prime Minister for Interior Affairs; Minister of Governance	Manuel Fraga	FET–JONS^{/FEDISA}	12 December 1975	5 July 1976	
Deputy Prime Minister for Economic Affairs; Minister of Finance	Juan Miguel Villar Mir	FET–JONS^{/NP}	12 December 1975	5 July 1976	
Minister of Foreign Affairs	José María de Areilza	FET–JONS^{/FEDISA}	12 December 1975	5 July 1976	
Minister of Justice	Antonio Garrigues Díaz-Cañabate	FET–JONS^{/NP}	12 December 1975	5 July 1976	
Minister of the Army	Félix Álvarez-Arenas	Military	12 December 1975	5 July 1976	
Minister of the Navy	Gabriel Pita da Veiga	Military	12 December 1975	5 July 1976	
Minister of Public Works	Antonio Valdés González-Roldán	FET–JONS^{/NP}	12 December 1975	5 July 1976	
Minister of Education and Science	Carlos Robles Piquer	FET–JONS^{/NP}	12 December 1975	5 July 1976	
Minister of Labour	José Solís Ruiz	FET–JONS	12 December 1975	5 July 1976	
Minister of Industry	Carlos Pérez de Bricio	FET–JONS^{/FEDISA}	12 December 1975	5 July 1976	
Minister of Agriculture	Virgilio Oñate Gil	FET–JONS^{/UDE}	12 December 1975	5 July 1976	
Minister of the Air	Carlos Franco Iribarnegaray	Military	12 December 1975	5 July 1976	
Minister of Trade	Leopoldo Calvo-Sotelo	FET–JONS^{/FEDISA}	12 December 1975	5 July 1976	
Minister of Information and Tourism	Adolfo Martín-Gamero	FET–JONS^{/NP}	12 December 1975	5 July 1976	
Minister of Housing	Francisco Lozano Vicente	FET–JONS^{/NP}	12 December 1975	5 July 1976	
Minister of the Presidency	Alfonso Osorio	FET–JONS^{/UDE}	12 December 1975	5 July 1976	
Minister for Trade Union Relations	Rodolfo Martín Villa	FET–JONS^{/GPI}	12 December 1975	5 July 1976	
Minister Secretary-General of the Movement	Adolfo Suárez	FET–JONS^{/UDPE}	12 December 1975	5 July 1976	
Minister of Development Planning	Alfonso Osorio took on the ordinary discharge of duties from 12 December 1975 to 9 January 1976.				
=== Changes January 1976 ===
Portfolio	Name	Faction	Took office	Left office	Ref.
~~Minister of Development Planning~~	Disestablished on 9 January 1976.				
=== Changes July 1976 ===
Portfolio	Name	Party	Took office	Left office	Ref.
Prime Minister	Fernando de Santiago served in acting capacity from 1 to 5 July 1976.				

== Bibliography ==
- T. Powell, Charles (1990). "The 'Tácito' group and Spain's transition to democracy, 1973-1977" (PDF). In Lannon, Frances; Preston, Paul (eds.). Élites and Power in Twentieth-Century Spain: Essays in Honour of Sir Raymond Carr. Clarendon Press, University of Oxford. pp. 249–268. ISBN 978-0198228806.
- T. Powell, Charles (1997). "Crisis del franquismo, reformismo y transición a la democracia" (PDF). In Tusell Gómez, Javier; Montero García, Feliciano; Marín Arce, José María (eds.). Las derechas en la España contemporánea (in Spanish). Anthropos. pp. 247–270. ISBN 84-7658-524-1.
- Ruiz Carnicer, Miguel Ángel (2013). "La Unión del Pueblo Español (UDPE): los orígenes de la macro-asociación azul de Alianza Popular (AP)" (PDF). Falange, las culturas políticas del fascismo en la España de Franco (1936-1975) (in Spanish). Autonomous University of Barcelona. pp. 499–514. ISBN 978-84-9911-216-9.

Preceded by Arias Navarro I	Government of Spain; 1975–1976	Succeeded by Suárez I
