= Government of Luis Carrero Blanco =

- Government of Spain
- 1973–1974
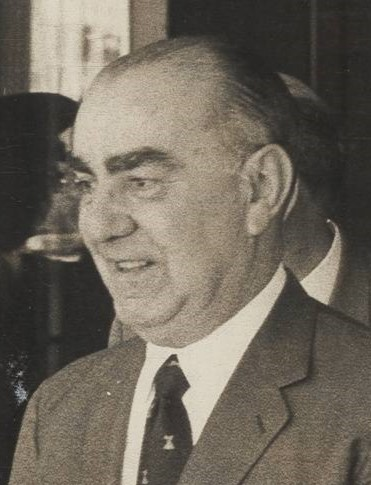
- Carrero Blanco in 1973
- Date formed: 12 June 1973
- Date dissolved: 4 January 1974

People and organisations
- Head of State: Francisco Franco
- Prime Minister: Luis Carrero Blanco (Jun–Dec 1973); Torcuato Fernández-Miranda (Dec 1973; acting)
- Deputy Prime Minister: Torcuato Fernández-Miranda
- No. of ministers: 19 (Note: Does not include the prime minister.)
- Total no. of members: 19
- Member party: FET–JONS
- Status in legislature: One-party state

History
- Legislature term: 10th Cortes Españolas
- Budget: 1974
- Predecessor: Franco VIII
- Successor: Arias Navarro I

The government of Luis Carrero Blanco was formed on 12 June 1973, following his appointment and swearing-in as prime minister of Spain on 9 June by Head of State Francisco Franco, who for the first time since 1938 had chosen to detach the figure of the head of government from that he held of head of state. It succeeded the eighth Franco government and was the government of Spain from 12 June 1973 to 4 January 1974, a total of 206 days, or 6 months and 23 days.

Carrero Blanco's cabinet was made up of members from the different factions or "families" within the National Movement: mainly the FET y de las JONS party—the only legal political party during the Francoist regime—the military and the Opus Dei, as well as a number of aligned-nonpartisan technocrats or figures from the civil service. The government would be disestablished following the assassination of Luis Carrero Blanco in Madrid by the Basque separatist group ETA on 20 December 1973, only six months into his term, being temporarily replaced in acting capacity by his deputy Torcuato Fernández-Miranda until a Carlos Arias Navarro was chosen as new prime minister. Under the regulations of the Organic Law of the State of 1967, all government ministers were automatically dismissed on 31 December upon the appointment of the new prime minister, but remained in acting capacity until the next government was sworn in.

== Council of Ministers ==
The Council of Ministers was structured into the offices for the prime minister, the deputy prime minister and 19 ministries.

← Carrero Blanco Government → (12 June 1973 – 4 January 1974)
| Portfolio | Name | Party | Took office | Left office | Ref. |
| Prime Minister | Luis Carrero Blanco | Military | 9 June 1973 | 20 December 1973† | |
| Deputy Prime Minister; Minister Secretary-General of the Movement | Torcuato Fernández-Miranda | FET–JONS | 12 June 1973 | 4 January 1974 | |
| Minister of Foreign Affairs | Laureano López Rodó | Opus Dei | 12 June 1973 | 4 January 1974 | |
| Minister of Justice | Francisco Ruiz-Jarabo | FET–JONS | 12 June 1973 | 4 January 1974 | |
| Minister of the Army | Francisco Coloma Gallegos | Military | 12 June 1973 | 4 January 1974 | |
| Minister of the Navy | Gabriel Pita da Veiga | Military | 12 June 1973 | 4 January 1974 | |
| Minister of Finance | Antonio Barrera de Irimo | Nonpartisan | 12 June 1973 | 4 January 1974 | |
| Minister of Governance | Carlos Arias Navarro | FET–JONS | 12 June 1973 | 31 December 1973 | |
| Minister of Public Works | Gonzalo Fernández de la Mora | Nonpartisan | 12 June 1973 | 4 January 1974 | |
| Minister of Education and Science | Julio Rodríguez Martínez | Nonpartisan | 12 June 1973 | 4 January 1974 | |
| Minister of Labour | Licinio de la Fuente | FET–JONS | 12 June 1973 | 4 January 1974 | |
| Minister of Industry | José María López de Letona | Nonpartisan | 12 June 1973 | 4 January 1974 | |
| Minister of Agriculture | Tomás Allende y García-Baxter | FET–JONS | 12 June 1973 | 4 January 1974 | |
| Minister of the Air | Julio Salvador y Díaz-Benjumea | Military | 12 June 1973 | 4 January 1974 | |
| Minister of Trade | Agustín Cotorruelo | Nonpartisan | 12 June 1973 | 4 January 1974 | |
| Minister of Information and Tourism | Fernando de Liñán | FET–JONS | 12 June 1973 | 4 January 1974 | |
| Minister of Housing | José Utrera Molina | FET–JONS | 12 June 1973 | 4 January 1974 | |
| Minister Undersecretary of the Presidency | José María Gamazo | Nonpartisan | 12 June 1973 | 4 January 1974 | |
| Minister of Trade Union Relations | Enrique García-Ramal | FET–JONS | 12 June 1973 | 4 January 1974 | |
| Ministry of Development Planning | Cruz Martínez Esteruelas | FET–JONS | 12 June 1973 | 4 January 1974 | |
=== Changes December 1973 ===
| Portfolio | Name | Party | Took office | Left office | Ref. |
| Prime Minister | Torcuato Fernández-Miranda served in acting capacity from 20 to 31 December 1973. | | | | |

== Bibliography ==
- Ynfante, Jesús (1970). "Capítulo II: Las bases de reclutamiento. 3. El Opus Dei en la enseñanza superior". La prodigiosa aventura del Opus Dei. Génesis y desarrollo de la Santa Mafia (in Spanish). Anthropos.

| Preceded by Franco VIII | Government of Spain; 1973–1974 | Succeeded by Arias Navarro I |
