= Eighth government of Francisco Franco =

8th government of Francisco Franco
- Government of Spain
- 1969–1973
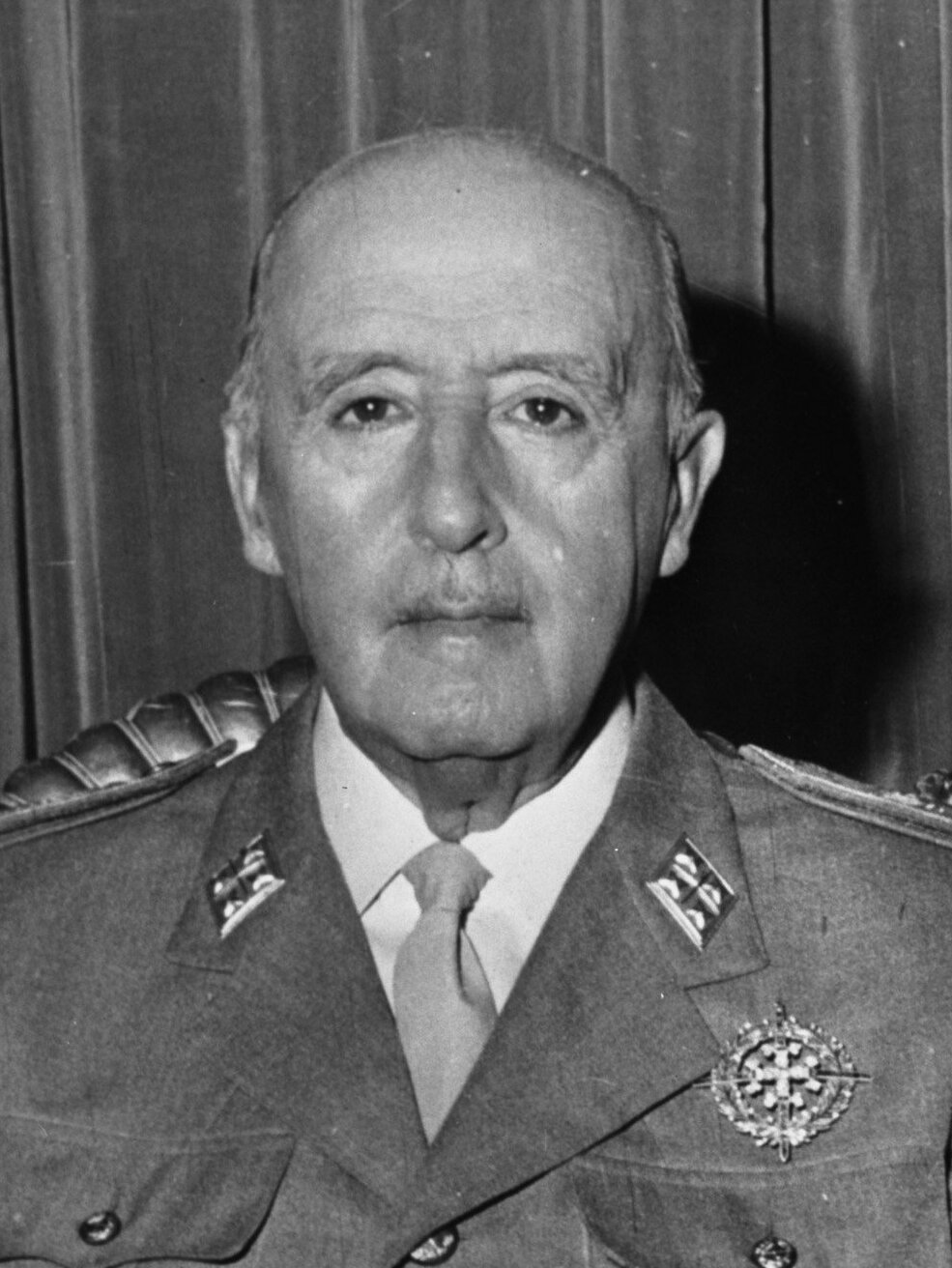
- Franco in 1969
- Date formed: 30 October 1969
- Date dissolved: 12 June 1973

People and organisations
- Head of State: Francisco Franco
- Prime Minister: Francisco Franco
- Deputy Prime Minister: Luis Carrero Blanco
- No. of ministers: 19 (Note: Does not include the prime minister.)
- Total no. of members: 20
- Member party: FET–JONS
- Status in legislature: One-party state

History
- Legislature terms: 9th Cortes Españolas; 10th Cortes Españolas
- Budget: 1970–71, 1972, 1973
- Predecessor: Franco VII
- Successor: Carrero Blanco

The eighth (Note: Sources differ on the numbering, depending on whether they consider every cabinet change or just major reshuffles as giving way to a different government. In this sense, some consider the 1969–1973 period as a single government under Franco (the eighth), whereas others split it into two separate ones: 1969–1970 (14th) and 1970–1973 (15th).) government of Francisco Franco was formed on 30 October 1969, after the latter had sacked 13 out of 18 of his ministers—in what was to become the largest cabinet reshuffle in the whole Francoist period—as a result of internal divisions between the various factions within the National Movement and the unveiling of the Matesa scandal earlier that year. It succeeded the seventh Franco government and was the government of Spain from 30 October 1969 to 12 June 1973, a total of 1,321 days, or 3 years, 7 months and 13 days.

Franco's eighth cabinet was made up of members from the different factions or "families" within the National Movement: mainly the FET y de las JONS party—the only legal political party during the Francoist regime—the military, the Opus Dei and the National Catholic Association of Propagandists (ACNP), as well as a number of aligned-nonpartisan technocrats or figures from the civil service. It would be the last government under the direct control of Franco, as he would give up the post of prime minister to his deputy Luis Carrero Blanco on 9 June 1973.

== Council of Ministers ==
The Council of Ministers was structured into the offices for the prime minister, the deputy prime minister and 19 ministries, including two ministers without portfolio.

← Franco VIII Government → (30 October 1969 – 12 June 1973)
Portfolio	Name	Party	Took office	Left office	Ref.
Head of State; Prime Minister	Francisco Franco	Military	30 January 1938	9 June 1973	
Deputy Prime Minister; Minister Undersecretary of the Presidency	Luis Carrero Blanco	Military	22 September 1967	12 June 1973	
Minister of Foreign Affairs	Gregorio López-Bravo	Opus Dei	30 October 1969	12 June 1973	
Minister of Justice	Antonio María de Oriol	FET–JONS^{/Trad.}	8 July 1965	12 June 1973	
Minister of the Army	Juan Castañón de Mena	Military	30 October 1969	12 June 1973	
Minister of the Navy	Adolfo Baturone Colombo	Military	30 October 1969	12 June 1973	
Minister of Finance	Alberto Monreal Luque	Nonpartisan	30 October 1969	12 June 1973	
Minister of Governance	Tomás Garicano	FET–JONS^{/ACNP}	30 October 1969	12 June 1973	
Minister of Public Works	Federico Silva Muñoz	ACNP	8 July 1965	14 April 1970	
Minister of Education and Science	José Luis Villar Palasí	Nonpartisan	17 April 1968	12 June 1973	
Minister of Labour	Licinio de la Fuente	FET–JONS	30 October 1969	12 June 1973	
Minister of Industry	José María López de Letona	Nonpartisan	30 October 1969	12 June 1973	
Minister of Agriculture	Tomás Allende y García-Baxter	FET–JONS	30 October 1969	12 June 1973	
Minister of the Air	Julio Salvador y Díaz-Benjumea	Military	30 October 1969	12 June 1973	
Minister of Trade	Enrique Fontana Codina	FET–JONS	30 October 1969	12 June 1973	
Minister of Information and Tourism	Alfredo Sánchez Bella	ACNP	30 October 1969	12 June 1973	
Minister of Housing	Vicente Mortes	FET–JONS^{/Opus}	30 October 1969	12 June 1973	
Minister Secretary-General of the Movement	Torcuato Fernández-Miranda	FET–JONS	30 October 1969	12 June 1973	
Minister without portfolio Commissioner for the Economic and Social Development Plan	Laureano López Rodó	Opus Dei	8 July 1965	12 June 1973	
Minister without portfolio National Delegate for Trade Unions	Enrique García-Ramal	FET–JONS	30 October 1969	12 June 1973	
=== Changes April 1970 ===
Portfolio	Name	Faction	Took office	Left office	Ref.
Minister of Public Works	Gonzalo Fernández de la Mora	Nonpartisan	14 April 1970	12 June 1973	

== Departmental structure ==
Francisco Franco's eighth government was organised into several superior and governing units, whose number, powers and hierarchical structure varied depending on the ministerial department.

Unit/body rank

- (■) Undersecretary
- (■) Director-general
- (◆) Military & intelligence agency

Office (Original name)	Portrait	Name	Took office	Left office	Alliance/party	Ref.
=== Prime Minister's Office ===
Prime Minister (Presidencia del Gobierno)		Francisco Franco	30 January 1938	9 June 1973	FET–JONS (Military)	
Deputy Prime Minister (Vicepresidencia del Gobierno)		Luis Carrero Blanco	28 July 1967	9 June 1973	FET–JONS (Military)	
Minister Undersecretary of the Presidency (Ministro Subsecretario de la Presidencia)		Luis Carrero Blanco	19 July 1951	12 June 1973	FET–JONS (Military)	
=== Ministry of Foreign Affairs ===
Ministry of Foreign Affairs (Ministerio de Asuntos Exteriores)		Gregorio López-Bravo	30 October 1969	12 June 1973	FET–JONS (Opus Dei)	
=== Ministry of Justice ===
Ministry of Justice (Ministerio de Justicia)		Antonio María de Oriol	8 July 1965	12 June 1973	FET–JONS (Traditionalist)	
=== Ministry of the Army ===
Ministry of the Army (Ministerio del Ejército)		Juan Castañón de Mena	30 October 1969	12 June 1973	FET–JONS (Military)	
=== Ministry of the Navy ===
Ministry of the Navy (Ministerio de Marina)		Adolfo Baturone Colombo	30 October 1969	12 June 1973	FET–JONS (Military)	
=== Ministry of Finance ===
Ministry of Finance (Ministerio de Hacienda)		Alberto Monreal Luque	30 October 1969	12 June 1973	FET–JONS (Nonpartisan)	
=== Ministry of Governance ===
Ministry of Governance (Ministerio de la Gobernación)		Tomás Garicano	30 October 1969	12 June 1973	FET–JONS (also a member of ACNP)	
=== Ministry of Public Works ===
Ministry of Public Works (Ministerio de Obras Públicas)		Federico Silva Muñoz	8 July 1965	14 April 1970	FET–JONS (ACNP)	
Ministry of Public Works (Ministerio de Obras Públicas)		Gonzalo Fernández de la Mora	14 April 1970	12 June 1973	FET–JONS (Nonpartisan)	
=== Ministry of Education and Science ===
Ministry of Education and Science (Ministerio de Educación y Ciencia)		José Luis Villar Palasí	17 April 1968	12 June 1973	FET–JONS (Nonpartisan)	
=== Ministry of Labour ===
Ministry of Labour (Ministerio de Trabajo)		Licinio de la Fuente	30 October 1969	12 June 1973	FET–JONS	
=== Ministry of Industry ===
Ministry of Industry (Ministerio de Industria)		José María López de Letona	30 October 1969	12 June 1973	FET–JONS (Nonpartisan)	
=== Ministry of Agriculture ===
Ministry of Agriculture (Ministerio de Agricultura)		Tomás Allende y García-Baxter	30 October 1969	12 June 1973	FET–JONS	
=== Ministry of the Air ===
Ministry of the Air (Ministerio del Aire)		Julio Salvador y Díaz-Benjumea	30 October 1969	12 June 1973	FET–JONS (Military)	
=== Ministry of Trade ===
Ministry of Trade (Ministerio de Comercio)		Enrique Fontana Codina	30 October 1969	12 June 1973	FET–JONS	
=== Ministry of Information and Tourism ===
Ministry of Information and Tourism (Ministerio de Información y Turismo)		Alfredo Sánchez Bella	30 October 1969	12 June 1973	FET–JONS (ACNP)	
=== Ministry of Housing ===
Ministry of Housing (Ministerio de la Vivienda)		Vicente Mortes	30 October 1969	12 June 1973	FET–JONS (also a member of Opus Dei)	
=== Ministers without portfolio ===
Minister Secretary-General of FET–JONS (Ministro Secretario General de FET y de las JONS)		Torcuato Fernández-Miranda	30 October 1969	12 June 1973	FET–JONS	
Minister without portfolio; Commissioner for the Economic and Social Development Plan (Ministro sin cartera; Comisario del Consejo de Economía Nacional)		Laureano López Rodó	8 July 1965	12 June 1973	FET–JONS (Opus Dei)	
Minister without portfolio; National Delegate for Trade Unions (Ministro sin cartera; Delegado Nacional de Sindicatos)		Enrique García-Ramal	30 October 1969	12 June 1973	FET–JONS	

== Bibliography ==
- Ynfante, Jesús (1970). "Capítulo II: Las bases de reclutamiento. 3. El Opus Dei en la enseñanza superior". La prodigiosa aventura del Opus Dei. Génesis y desarrollo de la Santa Mafia (in Spanish). Ruedo ibérico.
- Sánchez Recio, Glicerio (2013). "Familias políticas, estructuras de poder, instituciones del régimen". In Ruiz Carnicer, Miguel Ángel (ed.). Falange, las culturas políticas del fascismo en la España de Franco (1936-1975) (in Spanish). Vol. 1. Clarendon Press, University of Oxford. pp. 217–229. ISBN 978-84-9911-216-9.

Preceded by Franco VII	Government of Spain; 1969–1973	Succeeded by Carrero Blanco
