= First government of Carlos Arias Navarro =

1st government of Carlos Arias Navarro
- Government of Spain
- 1974–1975
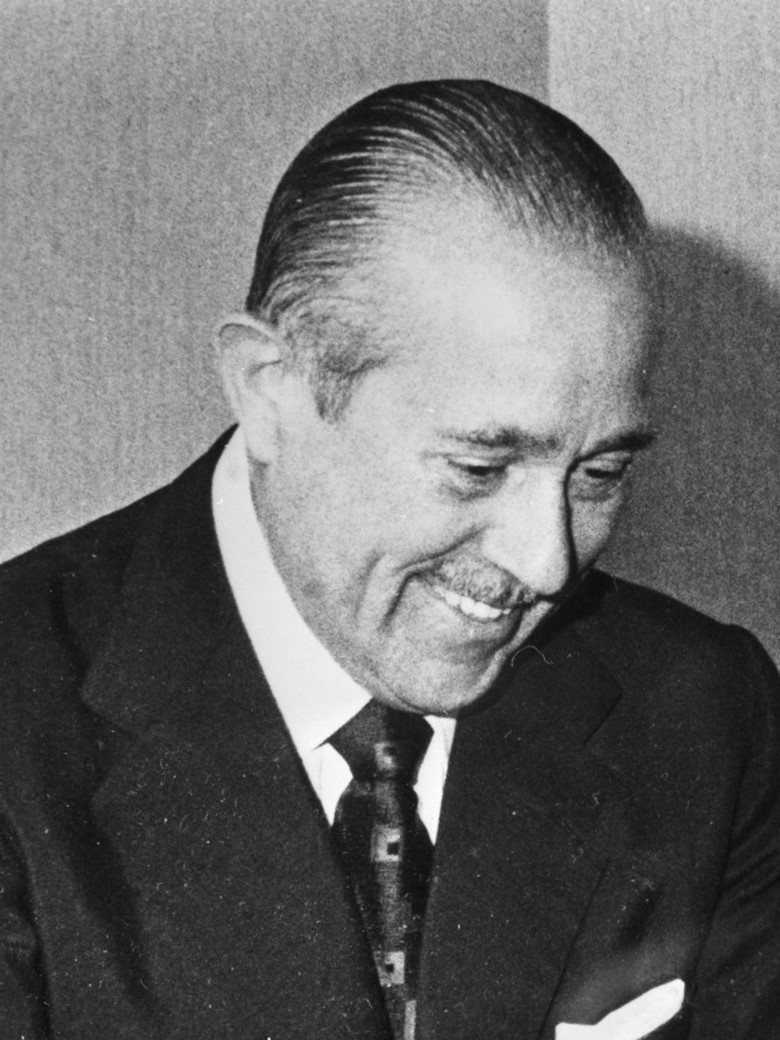
- Arias Navarro in October 1975
- Date formed: 4 January 1974
- Date dissolved: 12 December 1975

People and organisations
- Head of State/Monarch: Francisco Franco (1974–1975); Council of the Realm (1975); Juan Carlos I (1975)
- Prime Minister: Carlos Arias Navarro
- Deputy Prime Ministers: First: José García Hernández; Second: Antonio Barrera de Irimo (1974); Rafael Cabello de Alba (1974–1975); Third: Licinio de la Fuente
- No. of ministers: 19 (Note: Does not include the prime minister.)
- Total no. of members: 27
- Member party: FET–JONS
- Status in legislature: One-party state

History
- Legislature term: 10th Cortes Españolas
- Budget: 1975
- Predecessor: Carrero Blanco
- Successor: Arias Navarro II

The first government of Carlos Arias Navarro was formed on 4 January 1974, following the latter's appointment as prime minister of Spain by Head of State Francisco Franco on 29 December and his swearing-in on 2 January, as a result of Luis Carrero Blanco's assassination on 20 December 1973. It succeeded the Carrero Blanco government and was the government of Spain from 4 January 1974 to 12 December 1975, a total of 707 days, or 1 year, 11 months and 8 days.

Arias Navarro's first cabinet was the last to serve under Franco, was made up of members from the different factions or "families" within the National Movement: mainly the FET y de las JONS party—the only legal political party during the Francoist regime—the military and a number of aligned-nonpartisan figures from the civil service, to be joined later on by the legally-recognized Spanish People's Union (UDPE).

== Council of Ministers ==
The Council of Ministers was structured into the offices for the prime minister, the three deputy prime ministers and 19 ministries.

← Arias Navarro I Government → (4 January 1974 – 12 December 1975)
Portfolio	Name	Party	Took office	Left office	Ref.
Prime Minister	Carlos Arias Navarro	FET–JONS	31 December 1973	5 December 1975	
First Deputy Prime Minister; Minister of Governance	José García Hernández	FET–JONS^{/NP}	4 January 1974	12 December 1975	
Second Deputy Prime Minister; Minister of Finance	Antonio Barrera de Irimo	Nonpartisan	4 January 1974	30 October 1974	
Third Deputy Prime Minister; Minister of Labour	Licinio de la Fuente	FET–JONS	4 January 1974	5 March 1975	
Minister of Foreign Affairs	Pedro Cortina Mauri	FET–JONS^{/NP}	4 January 1974	12 December 1975	
Minister of Justice	Francisco Ruiz-Jarabo	FET–JONS	4 January 1974	5 March 1975	
Minister of the Army	Francisco Coloma Gallegos	Military	4 January 1974	12 December 1975	
Minister of the Navy	Gabriel Pita da Veiga	Military	4 January 1974	12 December 1975	
Minister of Public Works	Antonio Valdés González-Roldán	FET–JONS^{/NP}	4 January 1974	12 December 1975	
Minister of Education and Science	Cruz Martínez Esteruelas	FET–JONS (Note: Joined the UDPE in July 1975.)	4 January 1974	12 December 1975	
Minister of Industry	Alfredo Santos Blanco	FET–JONS^{/NP}	4 January 1974	5 March 1975	
Minister of Agriculture	Tomás Allende y García-Baxter	FET–JONS	4 January 1974	12 December 1975	
Minister of the Air	Mariano Cuadra Medina	Military	4 January 1974	12 December 1975	
Minister of Trade	Nemesio Fernández-Cuesta	FET–JONS^{/NP}	4 January 1974	5 March 1975	
Minister of Information and Tourism	Pío Cabanillas Gallas	FET–JONS^{/NP}	4 January 1974	30 October 1974	
Minister of Housing	Luis Rodríguez de Miguel	FET–JONS^{/NP}	4 January 1974	12 December 1975	
Minister of the Presidency	Antonio Carro Martínez	FET–JONS	4 January 1974	12 December 1975	
Minister for Trade Union Relations	Alejandro Fernández Sordo	FET–JONS	4 January 1974	12 December 1975	
Minister Secretary-General of the Movement	José Utrera Molina	FET–JONS	4 January 1974	5 March 1975	
Minister of Development Planning	Joaquín Gutiérrez Cano	FET–JONS	4 January 1974	12 December 1975	
=== Changes October 1974 ===
Portfolio	Name	Faction	Took office	Left office	Ref.
Second Deputy Prime Minister; Minister of Finance	Rafael Cabello de Alba	FET–JONS^{/NP}	30 October 1974	12 December 1975	
Minister of Information and Tourism	León Herrera Esteban	FET–JONS^{/NP}	30 October 1974	12 December 1975	
=== Changes March 1975 ===
Portfolio	Name	Faction	Took office	Left office	Ref.
Third Deputy Prime Minister; Minister of Labour	Fernando Suárez González	FET–JONS^{/NP}	5 March 1975	12 December 1975	
Minister of Justice	José María Sánchez-Ventura	FET–JONS^{/NP}	5 March 1975	12 December 1975	
Minister of Industry	Alfonso Álvarez Miranda	FET–JONS^{/NP}	5 March 1975	12 December 1975	
Minister of Trade	José Luis Cerón Ayuso	FET–JONS^{/NP}	5 March 1975	12 December 1975	
Minister Secretary-General of the Movement	Fernando Herrero Tejedor	FET–JONS^{/Opus}	5 March 1975	12 June 1975†	
=== Changes June 1975 ===
Portfolio	Name	Faction	Took office	Left office	Ref.
Minister Secretary-General of the Movement	José Solís Ruiz	FET–JONS	18 June 1975	12 December 1975	

== Bibliography ==
- T. Powell, Charles (1997). "Crisis del franquismo, reformismo y transición a la democracia" (PDF). In Tusell Gómez, Javier; Montero García, Feliciano; Marín Arce, José María (eds.). Las derechas en la España contemporánea (in Spanish). Anthropos. pp. 247–270. ISBN 84-7658-524-1.
- Ruiz Carnicer, Miguel Ángel (2013). "La Unión del Pueblo Español (UDPE): los orígenes de la macro-asociación azul de Alianza Popular (AP)" (PDF). Falange, las culturas políticas del fascismo en la España de Franco (1936-1975) (in Spanish). Autonomous University of Barcelona. pp. 499–514. ISBN 978-84-9911-216-9.

Preceded by Carrero Blanco	Government of Spain; 1974–1975	Succeeded by Arias Navarro II
