= Government of Carlos Arias Navarro =

Government of Carlos Arias Navarro may refer to:

- First government of Carlos Arias Navarro
- Second government of Carlos Arias Navarro
