= Garicano =

Garicano is a Basque surname. Notable people with the surname include:

- Tomás Garicano Goñi (1919–1988), Spanish lawyer and politician
- Luis Garicano (born 1967), Spanish economist

== See also ==
- Garitano
