= Joaquín Gutiérrez Cano =

Spanish diplomat and politician (1920–2009)

Minister of Development Planning
- In office 3 January 1974 – 11 December 1975
- Prime Minister: Carlos Arias Navarro

Personal details
- Born: 29 November 1920 Madrid
- Died: 2 March 2009 (aged 88) Madrid
- Party: FET y de las JONS
- Children: 4

Joaquín Gutiérrez Cano (1920–2009) was a Spanish diplomat and politician who was a member of the FET y de las JONS. He was one of the diplomats and civil servants served in the Franco regime. Between January 1974 to December 1975 he was the minister of development planning. El Mundo regards him as one of ten closest persons to Francisco Franco. Following the transition to democracy he worked at the World Bank as a representative of Spain.

== Biography ==
Gutiérrez was born in Madrid on 29 November 1920. He received a law degree. Following graduation he joined the Ministry of Foreign Affairs and served in different diplomatic posts. In 1957 he was appointed president of the National Union of Fruits and Horticultural Products and in February 1961 he simultaneously served as deputy secretary for Economic Planning and secretary general of the National Union Economic Council. In 1968 he was named as the executive director of the International Bank for Reconstruction and Development. He also served as the president of the Bank of Spain and the Industrial Credit Bank. In the period July 1973–January 1974 he was the ambassador of Spain to Japan. On 3 January 1974 he was appointed minister of development planning to the cabinet led by Prime Minister Carlos Arias Navarro. Gutiérrez was in office until 11 December 1975. In the post-Franco period he involved in business and was named the representative of Spain at the World Bank. He was also vice president of the Francisco Franco National Foundation.

Gutiérrez was married and had four daughters. He died in Madrid on 2 March 2009.
