= Virgilio Oñate Gil =

Spanish politician

Minister of Agriculture of Spain
- In office 12 December 1975 – 5 July 1976
- Prime Minister: Carlos Arias Navarro
- Preceded by: Tomás Allende y García-Baxter
- Succeeded by: Fernando Abril Martorell

Personal details
- Born: Virgilio Oñate Gil; 18 December 1924 Madrid, Spain
- Died: 1 June 1987 (aged 62) Aravaca, Spain
- Party: Spanish Democratic Union (National Movement)

Virgilio Oñate Gil (18 December 1924 – 1 June 1987) was a Spanish politician who served as Minister of Agriculture of Spain between 1975 and 1976, during the Francoist dictatorship.
