= Manuel Gutiérrez Mellado =

Spanish Army officer and politician

The Most Excellent Captain General Manuel Gutiérrez Mellado LM
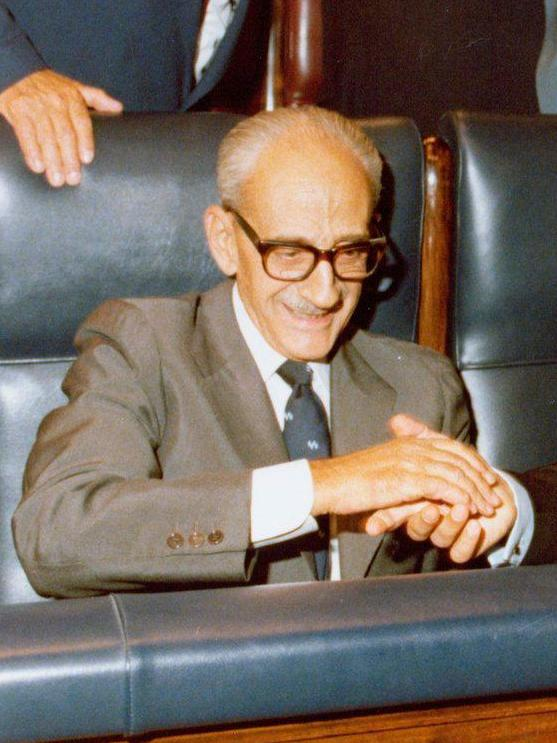
- Manuel Gutiérrez Mellado in 1980

Deputy Prime Minister of Spain
- In office 23 September 1976 – 26 February 1981
- Prime Minister: Adolfo Suárez
- Preceded by: Fernando de Santiago
- Succeeded by: Rodolfo Martín Villa

Minister of Defence
- In office 5 July 1977 – 6 April 1979
- Prime Minister: Adolfo Suárez
- Preceded by: Félix Álvarez-Arenas (Minister of the Army); Pascual Pery (Minister of the Navy); Carlos Franco Iribarnegaray (Minister of the Air)
- Succeeded by: Agustín Rodríguez Sahagún

Chief of Staff of the Army
- In office 7 July 1976 – 23 September 1976
- Preceded by: Emilio Villaescusa Quilis
- Succeeded by: Ramón Cuadra Medina

Personal details
- Born: Manuel Gutiérrez Mellado; 30 April 1912 Madrid, Spain
- Died: 15 December 1995 (aged 83) Torremocha del Campo, Spain
- Resting place: Villaviciosa de Odón cemetery
- Party: Independent
- Other political affiliations: FE de las JONS (1935–1937); FET y de las JONS (1937–1977)
- Spouse: Carmen Blasco Sancho
- Children: 4
- Profession: Military

Military service
- Allegiance: Spain
- Branch/service: Army
- Rank: Captain General
- Battles/wars: Spanish Civil War
- Awards: Legion of Merit

Manuel Gutiérrez Mellado, 1st Marquess of Gutiérrez Mellado (30 April 1912 – 15 December 1995) was a Spanish Army officer and politician who played a relevant role during the Spanish transition to democracy.

During his military career he served in relevant Army offices and began a political career in 1976, when the Prime Minister appointed him as First Deputy Prime Minister for Defence Affairs. From 1977 to 1979 he also served as Minister of Defence (the first since the Civil War).

In 1994, the socialist government of Felipe González granted him the honorary rank of Captain General.

Gutiérrez Mellado's most popular image is that at the Spanish Congress of the Deputies during the failed 1981 Spanish coup d'état, where he physically confronted the armed Guardia Civil troops led by Lieutenant Colonel Antonio Tejero.

== Education and military training ==
The offspring of an ancient Madrilenian bourgeois family, his parents died when he was a little child. However, his uncle, Saturnino Calleja, a well-known publisher, paid for his education at the Royal College of San Anton in Madrid, which was an elite boarding school at the time.

His wish to become an artillery officer was shattered by the military reforms of the Dictatorship of Primo de Rivera in 1927, which forced him to study at the General Military Academy of Zaragoza, directed by General Francisco Franco, to obtain his qualifications.

Five months after the proclamation of the Spanish Second Republic he was promoted to second lieutenant and later finished his military education at the Academy of Artillery and Engineers of Segovia, where he graduated as first lieutenant in July 1933, having achieved top grades in his class.

== Second Republic and Civil War ==
His first appointment was the Horse Artillery Regiment, based at the so-called Canton of Campamento, an isolated group of barracks seven kilometers west of Madrid. In 1935 he joined Falange Española de las JONS, an extreme right-wing political party, and on the dawn of July 20, 1936, he took arms with his unit in rebellion against the Frente Popular Government, being very active and combatant during their rebellion.

After ten hours of fighting, the coup was controlled by the republican militia. Gutiérrez Mellado escaped by walking to the nearby village of Villaviciosa de Odón, frequented by his family during their summer holidays, and later returned to Madrid in early August. Republican authorities indicted him for being involved in the July rebellion and he was jailed at his old school of San Anton, being fortunate enough not to have been included in the lethal lists that cost the lives of many other officers.

In February 1937, a jury declared him not guilty on the basis of his assertion, which was corroborated by two witnesses, that he was ill at Villaviciosa de Odón around the time of mid July and so was not able to take part in the coup d'état. However, simultaneous police inquires unveiled his active intervention in it, what induced him to take shelter at an embassy.

A few weeks later he joined Franco's clandestine intelligence services operating in Madrid, provided with an ID card belonging to a deceased republican soldier named Teodosio Paredes Laina.

In March 1938 he was promoted to captain. National Authorities had just organized the Information and Military Police Service (SIPM in its Spanish acronym) and he was appointed head of one of the three SIPM platoons assigned to the corps that besieged the capital. Gutiérrez Mellado provided his superiors with precious pieces of information related to republican plans, deployment and armament. He also was put in charge of the evacuation of more than a hundred pilots and engineer officers to the National Zone, specialties which were much needed by the Francoist forces.

== Military career ==
In 1941, after graduating from the General Staff School, he was appointed to the Ministry of the Army intelligence services. During World War II, having been promoted to major, he became responsible for the classification and final destination of the thousands of people that crossed the Pyrenees escaping from Nazi terror.

In 1945, Gutiérrez Mellado was assigned to the Information Section of the High General Staff and travelled to Belgium, France and Switzerland to acquire information about the attitudes and activities of republican exiles.

Furthermore, from 1953 to 1955, due to the pacts subscribed by Franco with the US government, he acted as liaison officer between the Ministry of Foreign Affairs and the Military Assistance Advisory Group (MAAG), responsible for building the bases and facilities for the US Armed Forces on Spanish soil.

In 1956, close to his promotion to lieutenant colonel and forced by the meager pay offered to the military at the time, he decided to quit the Army temporarily. He then went to work as a commercial manager for seven years within various companies. Around this time, approximately two-thirds of the military officers based in Spain's largest cities were involved in the practice of moonlighting. However, only a few of them made the drastic decision to leave the Army, as Gutiérrez Mellado did, considering it unethical to hold two different jobs at the same time, to the detriment of his military commitment.

In 1963, he returned to active duty as an instructor of the University Militia, which was aimed to train reserve officers and sergeants. Two years later, in 1965, he was promoted to colonel and assigned to the Operations Section of the Army Central Staff. Due to his fluency in English and French he was sent as an observer to several NATO maneuvers, which alerted him to the poor operational capacities of the highly overstaffed, late Francoist Spanish Armed Forces.

In 1967, Gutiérrez Mellado was assigned to be Commander in Chief of the 13th Field Artillery Regiment, based at Getafe, just outside Madrid; on April 13, 1970, he was promoted to brigadier general. For little more than a year he served as a professor at the High Center for National Defense Studies (CESEDEN), then directed by lieutenant general Manuel Díez-Alegría.

When Díez-Alegría was appointed Commander in Chief of the General Staff of the Armed Forces, he took Gutiérrez Mellado with him. General Gutiérrez Mellado's December 14, 1971, lecture at CESEDEN was the object of very favorable commentaries in military circles because of his speech's direct and accurate nature — something rather unusual at that time in Spain.

After being promoted to major general in 1973, a second lecture at the same Center, dated March 15, 1974, drew much broader attention than the first, due to his open vindication of urgent and radical reforms on the Armed Forces structure and organization. These words attracted the attention of many future leaders of the transition towards democracy — Prince Juan Carlos de Bourbon among them.

On June 14, 1975, Franco appointed him as General Commander and Governmental Delegate in Ceuta, posts that he shared with his previous commitment as head of the military delegation responsible for negotiating the January 1976 Spanish-American legislative treaty.

On April 13, 1976, King Juan Carlos I's first government promoted him to lieutenant general in command of VII Military Region. His first public address to the troops upon arriving in Valladolid immediately became press headlines and was subject to laudatory editorials and opinions in many political reviews. At that time, the Spaniards heard of a high-ranking Army officer openly aligned with the Rule of Law and demanding absolute respect from his subordinates towards civil power: “We must never forget that the Army, no matter how sacred its mission may be, is not there to rule but to serve under the command of the national government, and that its exclusive purpose is to serve Spain and our King”.

In July 1976, Gutiérrez Mellado was appointed Commander in Chief of the Army General Staff following favorable remarks about his virtues made by King Juan Carlos to Adolfo Suárez, the recently nominated Prime Minister.

Only three months later, on September 23, Gutiérrez Mellado was appointed vice president for Defense Affairs, a recently created office aimed at promoting the modernization of the Armed Forces. There he replaced lieutenant general Fernando de Santiago, who had abruptly resigned to demonstrate his opposition to President Suárez's political reforms. Gutiérrez Mellado remained at that office until February 1981.

== Deputy Prime Minister and Minister of Defense ==
Facts suggested that he had been planning carefully, when presented the proper opportunity, to quickly reform and transform Franco's sclerotic Armed Forces in depth. That allowed him, with less than a hundred days in office, to outline a complete reform project to be submitted to the Military Affairs Governmental Commission's first meeting on January 4, 1977, chaired by President Suárez.

His detailed reform project comprised a series of actions to be urgently taken on the following areas: defense superstructure; Armed Forces financial program; integrated personnel policy, and the limitation of the competence of military jurisdiction. The plan was wholly implemented before Gutiérrez Mellado left his office in 1981 and even successfully achieved other important issues, such as the creation of the Ministry of Defense on July 4, 1977.

Also on that date, he was also called to take charge of the new department and he remained in office until September 23, 1979, when the Democratic Center Union (UCD) executive, Agustín Rodríguez Sahagún, took over, thus becoming the first civilian to chair a military department since 1939. Gutiérrez Mellado remained as vice-president of the Government to coordinate Security and National Defense Affairs until President Leopoldo Calvo-Sotelo's investiture in February 1981.

In addition to the creation and organization of the Ministry of Defense and the consequent suppression of the Ministries of the Army, Navy and Air Force, special consideration should be given to the following measures:

— instauration of the Joint Chiefs of Staff (JUJEM);

— operative command attribution over their respective branches to the Army, Navy and Air Force Chiefs of Staff;

— legislative approval of 1980 Law of Defense and Military Organization Basic Criteria;

— banning of military intervention in politics;

— reform of the General Ordinance dictated by Charles III in 1768;

— Armed Forces Social Institute (ISFAS) implementation;

— instauration of the annual Armed Forces Day to substitute the military parade commemorating Franco's victory in the Spanish Civil War;

— officer promotion system regulation, and

— homologation of military salaries to those of public employees of a similar level (which most certainly abolished moonlighting).

It is obvious that this reform packet has been partially changed by the successive Ministers of Defense, but its doctrinal core has experienced few changes. In this respect, Gutiérrez Mellado's real merit was to establish the basis for the spectacular transformation of the Spanish Armed Forces which occurred during the last thirty years of the 20th century and which made them one of the most highly valued institutions in the opinion of the Spanish public, according to the Sociological Research Center (CIS) periodical surveys.

Gutiérrez Mellado's most popular image is that at the Spanish Congress of the Deputies during the failed coup d'état on February 23rd 1981 he physically confronted the armed Guardia Civil troops led by Lieutenant Colonel Antonio Tejero. By mere chance, due to a simple oversight by a civil guard who did not notice that a TV camera was recording, every Spaniard had the chance to see live how a frail man, nearly seventy years old and unknown to most, jumped up from his parliamentary seat and, armed only with his words, faced a dozen rebels armed with pistols and submachine guns. They tried to manhandle him down to the floor but were unable to do so, whereupon they opened fire so as to avoid any further interruption of their criminal activities.

Television retransmission of his defense of freedom would make Gutiérrez Mellado into a celebrated figure in post-Franco Spanish Politics. His effort in the face of armed revolt today remains an icon of the resolve of Spain's democratic government.

== Last years ==
After resigning his governmental duties and having also retired voluntarily from the Army, to exemplify the incompatibility of politics and a military career, he refrained from public activities until President Felipe González gave him a permanent seat on the State Council on May 28, 1984, where he chaired the First Section, which dealt with Defense Affairs.

In September 1986, deeply touched by the death of a close friend's son from a drug overdose, he sought the aid and financial help of several relevant businessmen and established the Anti-Drug Aid Foundation (FAD) which he chaired until the day of his death. The main FAD objective was to mobilize citizenship to aid young people in overcoming drug addiction at a time when heroin was a significant public health issue in Western countries. Apart from trying to alleviate the effects of drugs and repress their trafficking and consumption, its founder wanted society to give teenagers strong moral backup to repel them and to be brave enough to answer “No thank you” if tempted, as could be read on their posters during their first publicity campaign. In the years prior to his death, various Spanish universities and colleges opened their doors to Gutiérrez Mellado lecturing about democratic transition or about FAD activities.

In 1994, King Juan Carlos I rewarded him with the hereditary title of Marquess of Gutiérrez Mellado; the Parliament, with the Constitutional Order, and the Army High Council unanimously proposed Felipe Gonzalez's last Government to invest him with the honorary rank of Captain general of the Army. In September 1994, dressed for the first and last time in his Captain General's uniform, he received the homage of General Military Academy cadets at the same yard where, sixty-five years before, he had committed his life to defending the Spanish flag.

Fourteen months later, on December 15, 1995, ice on the road surface caused a fatal accident involving the car which the eighty-three-year-old general was driving on his way to Barcelona to lecture at Ramon Llull University. His funeral was held at the Army Headquarters, attended by the King and Queen of Spain, and he was buried at the cemetery of Villaviciosa de Odón. There he remains at the side of his wife, Carmen Blasco, who died in 2010, whom he had married in 1938 and was the mother of his five children.

After his death his daughter María del Carmen Gutiérrez-Mellado y Blasco became the 2nd Marchioness of Gutiérrez Mellado.

As a postmortem homage to his memory, the Ministry of Defense decided to give his name to a new center of studies patronized by the National Open University (UNED). The Instituto Universitario General Gutiérrez Mellado was created to promote defense culture among university students and to provide Spanish society with a specialized center of research and postgraduate studies on peace, security and defense.

== See also ==
=== Bibliography ===
- Cercas, Javier (2009). Anatomía de un instante, Barcelona: Mondadori. ISBN 9788439722137
- Fernández Santander, Carlos (1982). Los militares en la transición política. Barcelona: Argos Vergara.
- Gutiérrez Mellado, Manuel (1981). Al servicio de la Corona: palabras de un militar. Madrid: Ibérico Europea de Ediciones. ISBN 8425603641.
- Gutiérrez Mellado, Manuel (1983). Un soldado de España: conversaciones con Jesús Picatoste. Barcelona: Argos Vergara. ISBN 8471785331.
- Losada Malvárez, Juan Carlos (1990). Ideología del ejército franquista (1939-1959). Madrid: Istmo. ISBN 8470902253.
- Mérida, María (1979). Mis conversaciones con los generales: veinte entrevistas con altos mandos del Ejército y de la Armada. Barcelona: Plaza & Janés. ISBN 840133165X.
- Puell de la Villa, Fernando (1997). Gutiérrez Mellado: un militar del siglo XX. Madrid: Biblioteca Nueva. ISBN 978-84-7030-488-0.
- Puell de la Villa, Fernando (2005). Historia del ejército en España. Madrid: Alianza. ISBN 8420647926.
- Puell de la Villa, Fernando (2010). "De la Milicia Universitaria a la IPS", Revista de Historia Militar, Extra, 179–216. ISSN 0482-5748.
- Puell de la Villa, Fernando (2012). "La transición militar", Documentos de Trabajo Fundación Transición Española, 6. ISSN 2171-7699.
- Rosa Morena, Alfonso de la (coord.) (2009). Escuelas de Estado Mayor y de Guerra del Ejército: su contribución a doscientos años de Estado Mayor. Madrid: Ministerio de Defensa. ISBN 9788497815024.
- San Martín, José Ignacio (1983). Servicio especial: a las órdenes de Carrero Blanco (de Castellana a El Aaiún). Barcelona: Planeta.
- Serrano de Pablo Jiménez, Luis (1986). ¿La esperanza enterrada?: testimonio y recuerdos de un general de Franco. Madrid: Arca de la Alianza Cultural.

=== Related articles ===
- History of Spain
- Politics of Spain
- Prime Minister of Spain
- General Gutiérrez Mellado Street

Political offices
Preceded by Fernando de Santiago as Vice President for Defence (first in the succession line)	First Vice President of the Spanish Government in the Suárez I and Suárez II cabinets September 21, 1976 – February 26, 1981	Vacant until December 1981 Title next held by Rodolfo Martín Villa
Preceded by Félix Álvarez-Arenas as Minister of the Army	Spanish Minister of Defence; July 4, 1977 – April 6, 1979	Succeeded by Agustín Rodríguez Sahagún
Preceded by Pascual Pery as Minister of the Navy	Spanish Minister of Defence; July 4, 1977 – April 6, 1979	Succeeded by Agustín Rodríguez Sahagún
Preceded by Carlos Franco as Minister of the Air	Spanish Minister of Defence; July 4, 1977 – April 6, 1979	Succeeded by Agustín Rodríguez Sahagún
Spanish nobility
New title	Marquess of Gutiérrez Mellado; 1994–1995	Succeeded by María del Carmen Gutiérrez-Mellado Blasco
