= Fernando Herrero Tejedor =

Spanish jurist and politician (1920–1975)

- Born: 30 September 1920; Castellón de la Plana, Spain
- Died: 12 June 1975 (aged 54); Adanero, Spain
- Occupation: Jurist
- Political party: FET y de las JONS; Opus Dei (National Movement)

Fernando Herrero Tejedor (1920–1975) was a Spanish jurist and politician who was a member of the FET y de las JONS (FET), the ruling party of the Francoist Spain, as well as of the Opus Dei. He served as the minister-secretaries general of the movement between March and June 1975. He died in a car accident while serving in the post.

== Early life and education ==
Herrero was born in Castellón de la Plana on 30 September 1920. His father was a military officer. Herrero joined the Spanish civil war, and after the war he became a member of the FET. He had a law degree in Valencia.

== Career ==
Following graduation, Herrero began to work as the prosecutor of the provincial court in Castellón. He served in the civil government and the provincial headquarters of the FET in Castellón in 1955 and in Logroño in 1956. His another post was the civil governor of Segovia. He was made a member of the FET's national delegation of provinces in 1957. In 1961 he was appointed deputy secretary general of the FET, and on 30 September 1965 he was named the prosecutor of the Supreme Court. During this period he was also a member of the Parliament.

In October 1964, as deputy secretary general of the FET, he delivered a major address in Barcelona in which he argued for a more flexible posture toward communism, framed Spain as pursuing a "fourth position" distinct from both capitalism and Soviet Marxism, and endorsed the Falange press's support for expanding trade and cultural ties with Cuba.

On 5 March 1975 he was appointed secretary general of the movement to the cabinet led by Prime Minister Arias Navarro replacing Utrera Molina in the post.

== Personal life and death ==
One of his children was Fernando Herrero-Tejedor Algar (1949–2014) who was also a jurist. His another son, Luis Herrero, is a journalist and a former Member of the European Parliament for Spain.

On 12 June 1975 Herrero died in a traffic accident near Adanero near Ávila.
