= Carlos Pérez de Bricio =

Spanish businessman and politician (1927–2022)

Minister of Industry
- In office 12 December 1975 – 5 July 1977
- Prime Minister: Carlos Arias Navarro; Adolfo Suárez
- Preceded by: Alfonso Álvarez Miranda
- Succeeded by: Alberto Oliart

Personal details
- Born: Carlos Pérez de Bricio Olariaga; 1927 Madrid, Spain
- Died: 16 July 2022 (aged 94–95) Madrid, Spain

Carlos Pérez de Bricio (1927 – 16 July 2022) was a Spanish businessman and politician who was the minister of industry from 1975 to 1977.

== Biography ==
Pérez de Bricio was born in Madrid in 1927. He was the official of the Special Technical Customs Corps. In 1955 he was appointed delegate of Spain to the International Customs Cooperation Council based in Brussels and became its president in 1967. In 1968 he was elected as the executive president of the Union of Iron and Steel Companies and Entities and as the vice president of the Iron and Steel Basic Industries Commission. In April 1969 he served as the president of the OECD's subcommittee on iron and steel. In November 1969 he was appointed general director of Iron and Steel and Naval Industries. He held this position for six years until 1975 when he was appointed minister of industry in the second cabinet of Carlos Arias Navarro on 12 December 1975. He continued to serve in the same post in the cabinet led by Adolfo Suárez from 8 July 1976. He was the acting minister of public works between April and July 1977, replacing Leopoldo Calvo-Sotelo in the post who was dismissed from the office.

Pérez de Bricio founded Confemetal in 1978 and headed it until 2011. He was the executive president of Cepsa, a multinational oil and gas company, from 1985 to 2015. In July 2008 he was named as the independent director of Banesto, a Spanish credit bank, of which he was also a shareholder.

Pérez de Bricio died in Madrid on 16 July 2022, at the age of 94.
