= 1967 Spanish general election =

- 10 October 1967

102 of the 564 seats in the Cortes Españolas
- Registered: 16,500,000
- Turnout: 64.3%
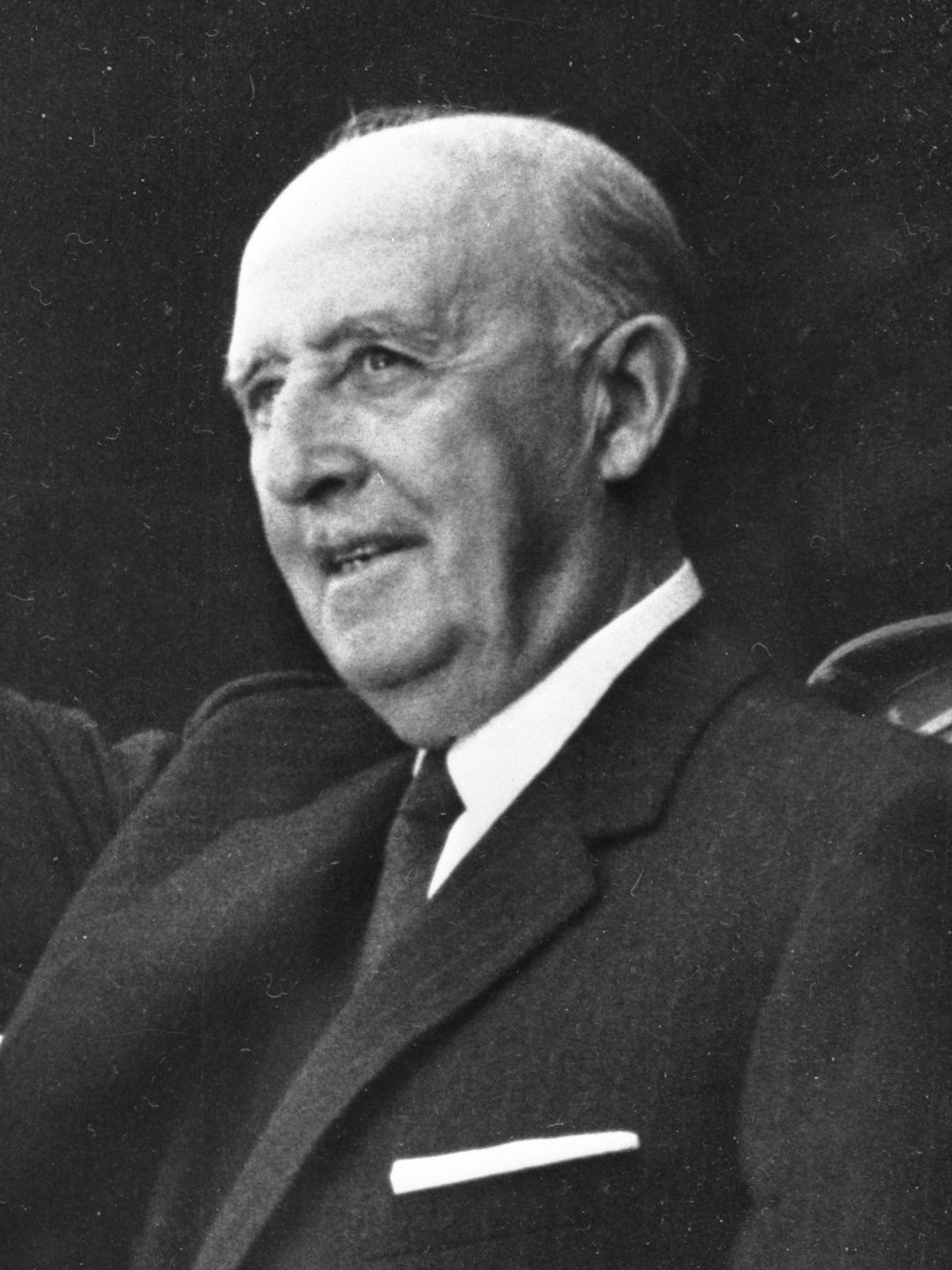
	First party
Leader	Francisco Franco
Party	National Movement
Seats before	564
Seats won	564
Seat change	0
Prime Minister before election
Francisco Franco
National Movement
Prime Minister after election
Francisco Franco
National Movement

General elections were held in Spain on 10 October 1967 where Spanish citizens elected 102 of the 564 members of the Cortes Españolas, the Spanish legislature. It was the first election held in Spain since the 1936 general election before the Spanish Civil War (1936–1939) and the first general election held during the dictatorship of Francisco Franco.

== Electoral procedure ==
To be eligible to vote, citizens must be heads of families, married women, or widows. To be eligible to be a candidate, citizens must be born in a province they are running in, have resided in the province for at least seven years since the age of 14, be supported by 1,000 electors of 0.5 percent of the province's population, and be a member of the National Movement.

Two members were elected from each province, including from Fernando Po, Río Muni, and Spanish Sahara; Ceuta and Melilla elected one member. The remaining seats were appointed by the Spanish government.

== Results ==
Party	Votes	%	Seats
National Movement			564
Total			564
Registered voters/turnout	16,500,000	64.3	
Source: Inter-Parliamentary Union
