= 1971 Spanish general election =

- 29 September 1971

104 of the 561 seats in the Cortes Españolas
- Registered: 17,252,103
- Turnout: 42.28%
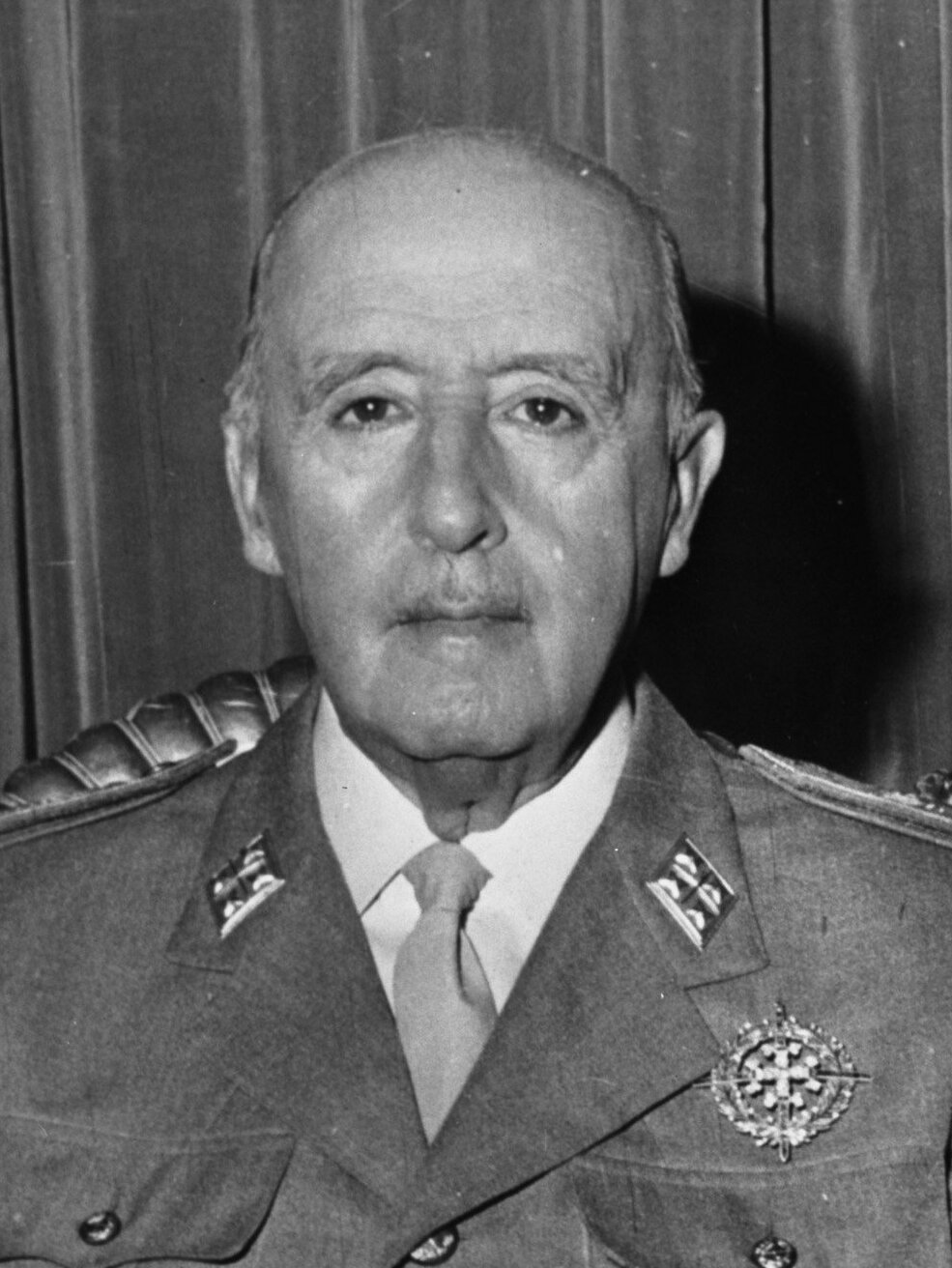
	First party
Leader	Francisco Franco
Party	National Movement
Seats before	564
Seats won	561
Seat change	▼3
Popular vote	7,294,134
Percentage	100%
Prime Minister before election
Francisco Franco
National Movement
Prime Minister after election
Francisco Franco
National Movement

General elections were held in Spain on 29 September 1971 where Spanish citizens elected 104 of the 564 members of the Cortes Españolas, the Spanish legislature.

== Electoral procedure ==
To be eligible to vote, citizens must be heads of families, married women, or widows. To be eligible to be a candidate, citizens must be born in a province they are running in, have resided in the province for at least seven years since the age of 14, be supported by 1,000 electors of 0.5 percent of the province's population, and be a member of the National Movement.

There were 230 candidates up for election to fill 104 seats to the Cortes Españolas. The remaining seats were appointed by the Spanish government.

== Results ==
Party	Votes	%	Seats
National Movement	7,294,134	100.00	561
Total	7,294,134	100.00	561
Registered voters/turnout	17,252,103	42.28	
Source: Inter-Parliamentary Union
