= Julio Rodríguez Martínez (politician) =

Spanish politician (1928-1979)

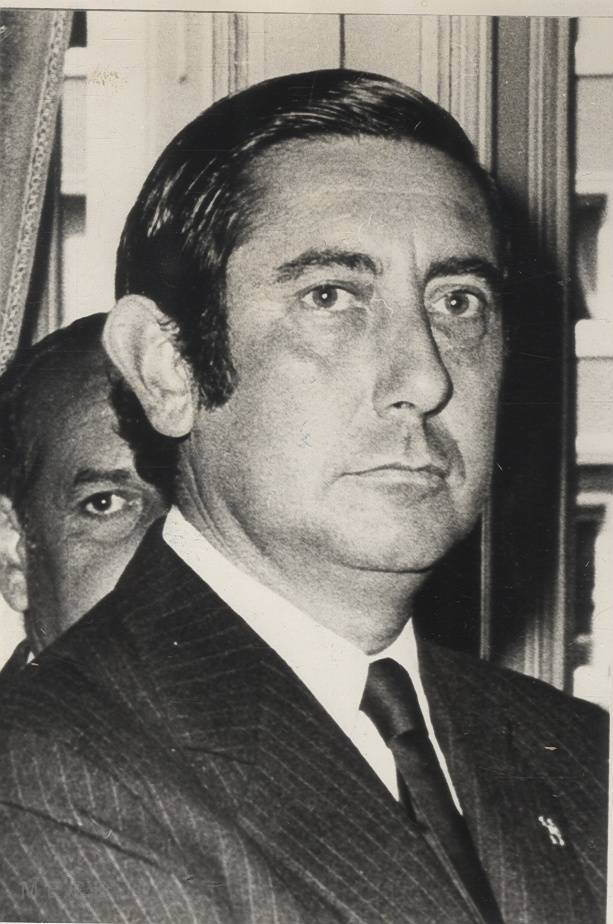

Minister of Education and Science of Spain
- In office 12 June 1973 – 4 January 1974
- Prime Minister: Luis Carrero Blanco
- Preceded by: José Luis Villar Palasí
- Succeeded by: Cruz Martínez Esteruelas

Personal details
- Born: Julio Rodríguez Martínez; 25 April 1928 Armilla, Kingdom of Spain
- Died: 28 January 1979 (aged 50) Santiago de Chile, Chile
- Party: Nonpartisan (National Movement)

Julio Rodríguez Martínez (25 April 1928 – 28 January 1979) was a Spanish politician who served as Minister of Education and Science of Spain between 1973 and 1974, during the Francoist dictatorship.
