= Garitano =

Garitano is a Basque surname. It may refer to:

- Ander Garitano (born 1969), Spanish football player and coach
- Asier Garitano (born 1969), Spanish football player and coach
- Gaizka Garitano (born 1975), Spanish football player and coach

== See also ==
- Garicano
