= Francisco Lozano Vicente =

Spanish politician

Minister of Housing of Spain
- In office 12 December 1975 – 5 July 1977
- Prime Minister: Carlos Arias Navarro; Adolfo Suárez
- Preceded by: Luis Rodríguez de Miguel
- Succeeded by: Office abolished

Personal details
- Born: Francisco Lozano Vicente; 4 October 1922 Barcelona, Spain
- Died: 8 June 2006 (aged 83) Madrid, Spain
- Party: Nonpartisan (National Movement)

Francisco Lozano Vicente (4 October 1922 – 8 June 2006) was a Spanish politician who served as Minister of Housing of Spain between 1975 and 1977.
