= José Luis Villar Palasí =

Spanish politician (1922–2012)

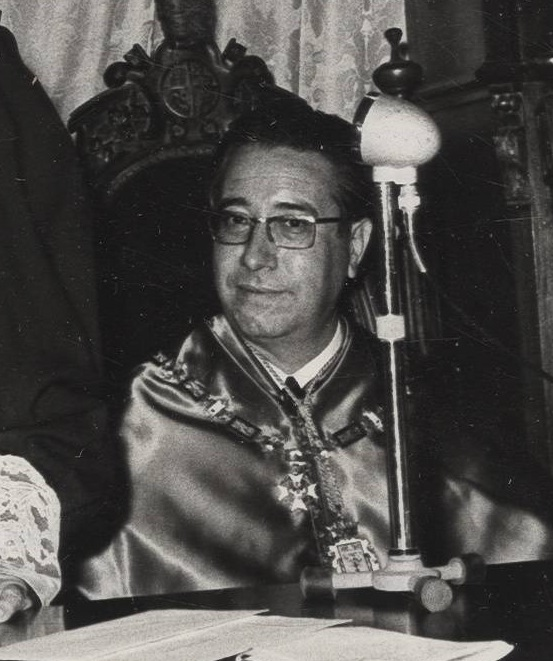

Minister of Education and Science of Spain
- In office 17 April 1968 – 9 June 1973
- Prime Minister: Francisco Franco
- Preceded by: Manuel Lora-Tamayo
- Succeeded by: Julio Rodríguez Martínez

Personal details
- Born: José Luis Villar Palasí; 30 September 1922 Valencia, Spain
- Died: 7 May 2012 (aged 89) Madrid, Spain
- Party: Nonpartisan (National Movement)

José Luis Villar Palasí (30 September 1922 – 7 May 2012) was a Spanish politician who served as Minister of Education and Science of Spain between 1968 and 1973, during the Francoist dictatorship. He was frequently associated with the Opus Dei during the Francoist regime, but his actual membership is disputed.

== Bibliography ==
- Sáez Alba, A. (1974). "Introducción a la ACNP". La otra cosa nostra. La Asociación Católica Nacional de Propagandistas y el caso de El Correo de Andalucía (in Spanish). Ruedo ibérico.
