= Cruz Martínez Esteruelas =

Spanish politician (1932–2000)

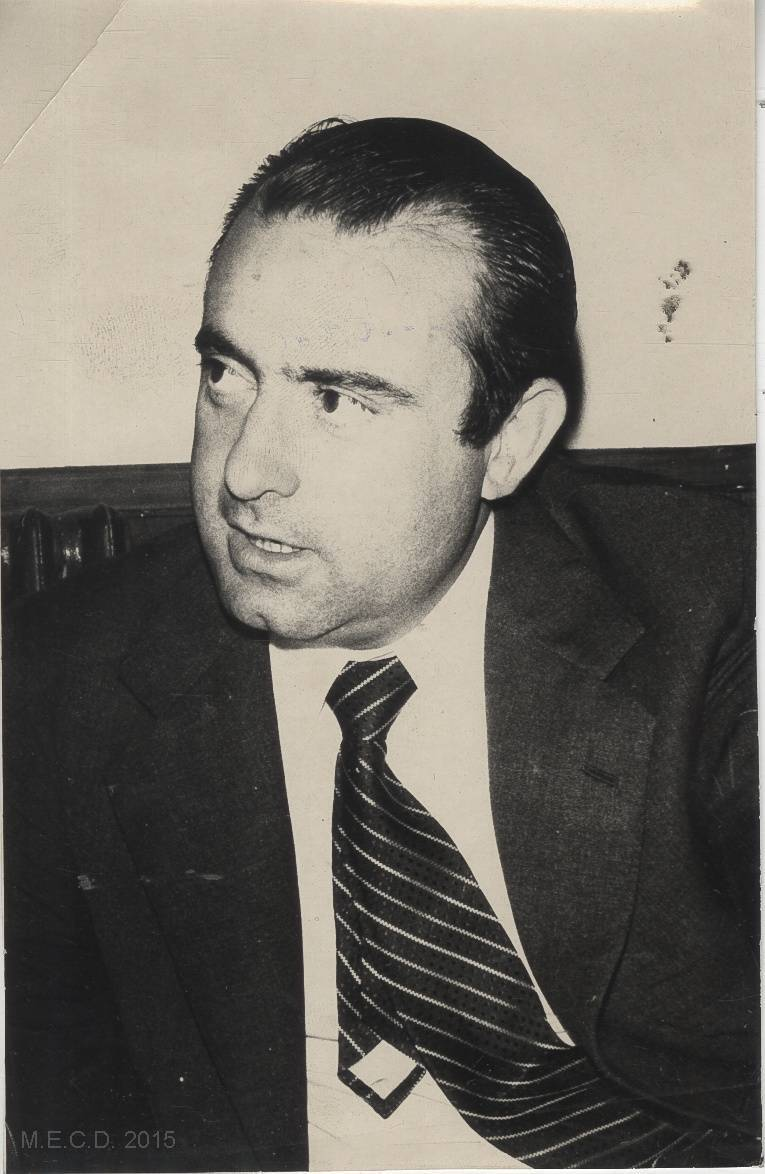

Minister of Education and Science of Spain
- In office 4 January 1974 – 12 December 1975
- Prime Minister: Carlos Arias Navarro
- Preceded by: Julio Rodríguez Martínez
- Succeeded by: Carlos Robles Piquer

Minister of Development Planning of Spain
- In office 12 June 1973 – 4 January 1974
- Prime Minister: Luis Carrero Blanco
- Preceded by: Office established
- Succeeded by: Joaquín Gutiérrez Cano

Personal details
- Born: Cruz Martínez Esteruelas; 4 February 1932 Hospitalet de Llobregat, Spain
- Died: 17 September 2000 (aged 68) Madrid, Spain
- Party: FET y de las JONS

Cruz Martínez Esteruelas (4 February 1932 – 17 September 2000) was a Spanish politician who served as Minister of Education and Science of Spain between 1968 and 1973, during the Francoist dictatorship. He was a member of FET y de las JONS.
