= Álvaro Rengifo =

Spanish politician (1932–2020)

Minister of Labour of Spain
- In office 8 July 1976 – 5 July 1977
- Prime Minister: Adolfo Suárez
- Preceded by: José Solís Ruiz
- Succeeded by: Manuel Jiménez de Parga

Personal details
- Born: Álvaro Rengifo Calderón; 5 July 1932 Madrid, Spain
- Died: 13 February 2020 (aged 87) Madrid, Spain
- Party: Nonpartisan (National Movement)

Álvaro Rengifo Calderón (5 July 1932 – 13 February 2020) was a Spanish politician who served as Minister of Labour of Spain between 1976 and 1977.
