= Ignacio García López =

Spanish politician (1924–2017)

Minister Secretary of the Government
- In office 7 April 1977 – 5 July 1977
- Prime Minister: Adolfo Suárez
- Preceded by: Office established
- Succeeded by: Office abolished

Minister Secretary-General of the Movement
- In office 8 July 1976 – 7 April 1977
- Prime Minister: Adolfo Suárez
- Preceded by: Adolfo Suárez
- Succeeded by: Office abolished

Personal details
- Born: Ignacio García López; 5 September 1924 Madrid, Spain
- Died: 20 December 2017 (aged 93) Madrid, Spain
- Party: Nonpartisan (National Movement)

Ignacio García López (5 September 1924 – 20 December 2017) was a Spanish politician who served as the final Minister Secretary-General of the Movement between 1976 and 1977 and briefly as Minister Secretary of the Government in 1977.
