= Spanish People's Union =

Spanish People's Union Unión del Pueblo Español
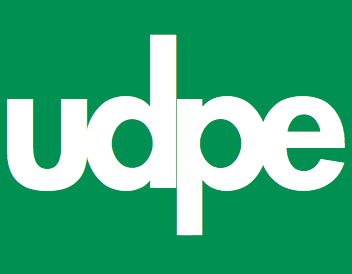
- Abbreviation: UDPE
- President: Cruz Martínez Esteruelas
- Founded: February 11, 1975
- Dissolved: May 4, 1977
- Merged into: People's Alliance
- Headquarters: C/ Basílica 19; Madrid, Spain
- Ideology: National conservatism Post-Francoism; Spanish nationalism
- Political position: Right-wing to far-right
- National affiliation: People's Alliance (1975-1977)

The Spanish People's Union (Spanish: Unión del Pueblo Español; UDPE) was a conservative and Spanish nationalist political party in Spain.

== History ==
UDPE was created in 1975, initially under the name of People's Alliance, on 11 February 1975. The group changed its name to Spanish People's Union on 22 May 1975. It was officially recognized and definitely by the Movimiento Nacional on 28 July 1975. The "political associations" were the result of development of the Organic Law of the State of 1966, and sought to promote a very limited and controlled "pluralism" within Francoist Spain.

The Spanish People's Union was led by the, then Minister of Education, Cruz Martínez Esteruelas and the general secretary of the Movimiento Nacional Adolfo Suárez. The Spanish People's Union wanted to group the ruling politicians of Francoism, very attached to the bureaucratic apparatus of the Movement. On 11 July 1975, Adolfo Suarez become president of the UDPE, until 12 December, when he left to be secretary general of the Movimiento Nacional again.

On 22 and 23 June 1976 the UDPE held its first congress in Madrid, where the association decided to become a political party -which occurred on 17 September 1976- and Cruz Martínez Esteruelas was confirmed as president of the party.

UDPE joined the People's Alliance (AP) with other political forces on 9 October 1976. Its dissolution took place on 4 May 1977, to merge with Regional Action, Social Democracy, Democratic Reform and the Social Popular Union.
