= Tomás Allende y García-Baxter =

Spanish politician (1920–1987)

Minister of Agriculture of Spain
- In office 30 October 1969 – 12 December 1975
- Prime Minister: Francisco Franco; Luis Carrero Blanco; Carlos Arias Navarro
- Preceded by: Adolfo Díaz-Ambrona Moreno
- Succeeded by: Virgilio Oñate Gil

Personal details
- Born: Tomás Allende y García-Baxter; 4 February 1920 Guadalajara, Kingdom of Spain
- Died: 10 February 1987 (aged 67) Madrid, Spain
- Party: FET y de las JONS (National Movement)

Tomás Allende y García-Baxter (4 February 1920 – 10 February 1987) was a Spanish politician who was the Minister of Agriculture of Spain between 1969 and 1975 during the Francoist dictatorship.
