= Tomás Garicano =

Spanish military lawyer, governor and politician (1910–1988)

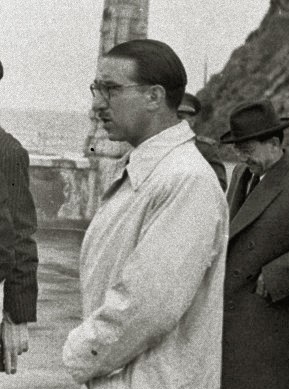

Minister of the Interior
- In office 29 October 1969 – 9 June 1973
- Preceded by: Camilo Alonso Vega
- Succeeded by: Carlos Arias Navarro

Personal details
- Born: Tomás Garicano Goñi; 9 February 1910 Pamplona
- Died: 16 January 1988 (aged 77) Madrid
- Party: FET y de las JONS; ACNP (National Movement)
- Spouse: María Rojas Gestosos
- Children: 6

Tomás Garicano Goñi (1910–1988) was a Spanish military lawyer, governor and politician, who served as interior minister in Francoist Spain. Following the Civil War he supported the repression of those who had opposed the Nationalist forces. He was a member of FET y de las JONS and the National Catholic Association of Propagandists.

== Early life and education ==
Garicano was born in Pamplona, Navarre, on 9 February 1910. His family were of Navarrese and Gipuzkoan descent. He studied law in Zaragoza and Madrid and graduated in 1929.

== Career ==
Garicano was a military lawyer. He served as governor of Barcelona for nearly thirteen years until 1969. He was appointed Minister of the Interior on 29 October 1969, succeeding Camilo Alonso Vega in the post when he left office due to mandatory age limit. Garicano's tenure lasted until May 1973 when he resigned from the post. He was replaced by Carlos Arias Navarro as interior minister.

== Personal life and death ==
Garicano married María Rojas Gestosos with whom he had six children. He was the grand uncle of LSE economist and politician of Ciudadanos Luis Garicano.

Garicano died in Madrid of cardiac arrest on 16 January 1988.

== Bibliography ==
- Sáez Alba, A. (1974). "Introducción a la ACNP". La otra cosa nostra. La Asociación Católica Nacional de Propagandistas y el caso de El Correo de Andalucía (in Spanish). Ruedo ibérico.
