= Fernando de Santiago =

Spanish politician (1910–1994)

The Most Excellent Fernando de Santiago
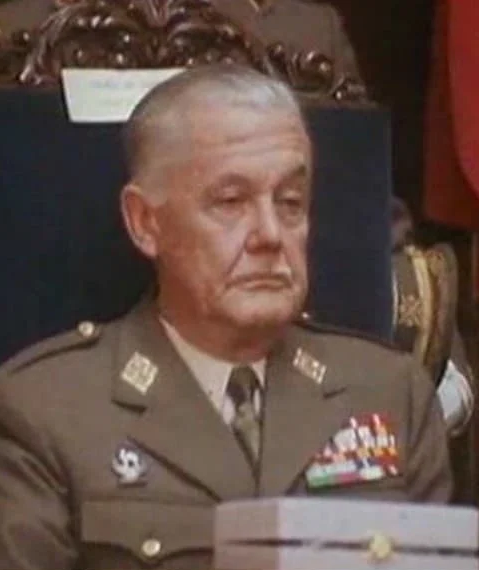
- Santiago in 1982

Prime Minister of Spain
- Acting
- In office 1 July 1976 – 5 July 1976
- Monarch: Juan Carlos I
- Deputy: Juan-Miguel Villar Mir
- Preceded by: Carlos Arias Navarro
- Succeeded by: Adolfo Suárez

Governor-General of the Spanish Sahara
- In office 4 March 1971 – 24 April 1974
- Preceded by: José María Pérez de Lerma
- Succeeded by: Federico Gómez de Salazar

Personal details
- Born: Fernando de Santiago y Díaz de Mendívil; 23 July 1910 Madrid, Spain
- Died: 6 November 1994 (aged 84) Madrid, Spain
- Party: Falange (1936–1980); Movimiento Nacional
- Spouse: María Ignacia Morales de Los Ríos y Palacio
- Children: 5

Military service
- Branch/service: Army
- Years of service: c. 1921-1981
- Rank: Lieutenant general
- Commands: Superior Polytechnic Army College

Fernando de Santiago y Díaz de Mendívil (23 July 1910 – 6 November 1994) was a politician who served as deputy prime minister of Spain and briefly as acting prime minister during the Spanish transition to democracy in the late 1970s. He had earlier been a general in the Spanish Civil War and under the dictatorship of Francisco Franco.

== Biography ==
As an active soldier, Santiago joined the Spanish Nationalists in the Spanish Civil War, rising to the rank of lieutenant general. In Francoist Spain, he served as a professor and later director of the Escuela Politécnica Superior del Ejército (Superior Polytechnic Army College).

In the waning years of Franco's rule, from 4 March 1971 to 24 April 1974, the dictator gave Santiago a task as political as it was military: serve as governor-general of Spanish Sahara after Spanish forces had massacred members of a native independence movement in the "Zemla Intifada". Santiago presided over the introduction of limited home-rule in the region, which was eventually decolonized a few years later.

Following Franco's death on 20 November 1975, Santiago was named Vicepresidente del Gobierno para la Defensa (deputy prime minister for defense) of Spain's first post-Franco government, under Prime Minister Carlos Arias Navarro. Following Arias' resignation, Santiago briefly served as interim prime minister, from 1 to 3 July 1976.

Under the administration of Adolfo Suárez, Santiago remained the principal deputy prime minister but gave up oversight of the defense ministry. While Arias Navarro had been considered a Francoist, Suárez would turn out to be a reformer, putting Spain on the road to democracy. Santiago would become a harsh critic of Suárez' government. He submitted a resignation letter shortly after Suárez announced he would support the Political Reform Act and its call for open elections; his resignation was accepted on 21 September 1976.

Out of office, Santiago continued to meet with conservative military officials disturbed by Spain's democratization and liberalization. In September 1977, he met with a group of army leaders—including Jaime Milans del Bosch—who secretly wrote a letter to King Juan Carlos I asking him to undertake "actions to rescue the destiny of the Fatherland". Bosch would later be implicated in the "23-F" coup attempt on 23 February 1981.

Santiago died in Madrid on 6 November 1994.

== Personal life ==
He married María Ignacia Morales de Los Ríos y Palacio at San Fermín de los Navarros in Madrid on 6 January 1934 who was the daughter of Santiago Morales de Los Ríos y Chávarri (b. Madrid, Salvador y San Nicolás, 1 May 1886 - ?) and Ana María de Palacio y Velasco (29 April 1890 - ?), daughter of the 6th Marquess of Casa Palacio and wife the 1st Marchioness of Villarreal de Álava and grandaunt of Loyola de Palacio and Ana de Palacio. Santiago's wife died in 2006, and they had five children:

- Ana María de Santiago y Morales de Los Ríos
- María Ignacia de Santiago y Morales de Los Ríos
- María Fernanda de Santiago y Morales de Los Ríos
- María del Dulce Nombre de Santiago y Morales de Los Ríos
- Fernando de Santiago y Morales de Los Ríos

Political offices
Preceded by Carlos Arias Navarro	President of the Government of Spain (acting); 1976	Succeeded by Adolfo Suárez González
