= Torcuato Fernández-Miranda =

Spanish politician (1915–1980)

The Most Excellent The Duke of Fernández-Miranda
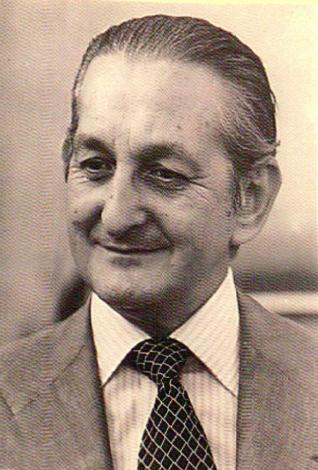

President of the Cortes Españolas
- In office 6 December 1975 – 30 June 1977
- Head of State: Francisco Franco; Juan Carlos I
- Preceded by: Alejandro Rodríguez de Valcárcel
- Succeeded by: Fernando Álvarez de Miranda (as President of the Congress of Deputies)

Prime Minister of Spain
- Acting
- In office 20 December 1973 – 31 December 1973
- Head of State: Francisco Franco
- Preceded by: Luis Carrero Blanco
- Succeeded by: Carlos Arias Navarro

First Deputy Prime Minister of Spain
- In office 12 June 1973 – 4 January 1974
- Prime Minister: Luis Carrero Blanco
- Preceded by: Luis Carrero Blanco
- Succeeded by: José García Hernández

Minister-Secretary General of the Movimiento Nacional
- In office 30 October 1969 – 4 January 1974
- Prime Minister: Francisco Franco; Luis Carrero Blanco; Carlos Arias Navarro
- Preceded by: José Solís Ruiz
- Succeeded by: José Utrera Molina

Member of the Senate
- In office 13 July 1977 – 2 January 1979
- Appointed by: Juan Carlos I

Personal details
- Born: Torcuato Fernández-Miranda y Hevia; 10 November 1915 Gijón, Asturias, Spain
- Died: 19 June 1980 (aged 64) St Mary's Hospital, London, UK
- Party: FET y de las JONS (1939–1977); Union of the Democratic Centre (1977–1978)
- Spouse: María del Carmen Lozana Abeo (m. 1946)
- Children: 2
- Education: Colegio de la Inmaculada
- Alma mater: University of Oviedo

Torcuato Fernández-Miranda y Hevia, 1st Duke of Fernández-Miranda (10 November 1915 – 19 June 1980) was a Spanish lawyer and politician who played important roles in both the Spanish State of Francisco Franco and in the Spanish transition to democracy.

Fernández Miranda was born in Gijón, Asturias, on Spain's north coast, in 1915. He died of a heart attack in 1980 while traveling to London.

== Francoist State ==
By the age of 30, Fernández Miranda had already served as a lieutenant for the Nationalists in the Spanish Civil War and begun a promising career as a law professor; that year, he earned a chair at the University of Oviedo, of which he would later serve as rector, 1951 to 1953. He was destined to make his biggest impact in public service, however.

Franco chose him to serve as the government's Director-General of University Education in the mid-1950s, and gave him an even weightier assignment in 1960: Fernández Miranda was entrusted with the political education of Prince Juan Carlos, whom Franco had tapped to carry on as his successor as the King of Spain, after the death of the caudillo. After having endured years of military training, Juan Carlos credited Fernández Miranda with being the first of his tutors to teach him to rely on independent thinking.

In the final years of the Francoist State – Franco would die 20 November 1975 – Fernández Miranda also played an important political role as a high-ranking member of the Movimiento Nacional (National Movement), the Francoist State's only legal political party. He served as interim Presidente del Gobierno (prime minister) for a few weeks in December 1973, after the assassination of Luis Carrero Blanco. He had been Carrero Blanco's principal deputy prime minister. Although Fernández Miranda was one of the top candidates to succeed Carrero Blanco, the job of prime minister—Franco's last, as it would turn out—went to Carlos Arias Navarro.

== Leader in transition ==
Shortly after Franco's death, Juan Carlos became king. He retained Arias Navarro as prime minister but, in a nod to his political mentor, named Fernández Miranda speaker of the Cortes (the legislature) and president of the Consejo del Reino (Council of the Kingdom) in the transition government. In these roles, Fernández Miranda was able to push a willing king toward the development of a democracy.

Fernández Miranda sought to establish a two-party system, with one conservative party and one liberal party. He suggested legitimizing the suppressed PSOE (Spanish Socialist Workers' Party), which was leftist but anti-communist, for the liberal role.

Upon Arias Navarro's resignation in 1976, Spain was still operating under Francoist law; it was Fernández Miranda's job, as head of the Council of the Kingdom, to suggest three names to the king for a new political leader. He placed the reformist Adolfo Suárez on his list, despite Suárez' relative inexperience. Suárez was duly selected, and soon called for a political reform law, to be followed by democratic elections, Spain's first in 40 years.

The law professor Fernández Miranda, still serving as speaker of the Cortes, was the principal author of Suárez' Ley para la Reforma Política (Political Reform Act), approved by the Government in September 1976, by the Cortes in November 1976, and by a popular referendum 15 December 1976.

== Democratic Spain ==
Although he played a large role in the transition to democracy, Fernández Miranda remained a political conservative. Following Suárez reforms with which he disagreed—such as the legalization of the Communist Party of Spain and increasing tolerance of decentralization – the speaker resigned from the Cortes prior to the first election, 15 June 1977.

After the election, he was named by the king to the Spanish Senate, which now became the upper house of a bicameral Cortes. He served there for one term, representing the UCD, until 2 January 1979. He was later created 1st Duke of Fernández-Miranda and Grandee of Spain on 31 May 1977. In 1977 or 1981 he also became 1,181st Knight of the Order of the Golden Fleece.

== Family ==
He married in Gijón on 24 April 1946 María del Carmen Lozana Abeo and had children:

- Enrique Fernández-Miranda y Lozana (b. Gijón, 12 September 1949), 2nd Duke of Fernández-Miranda and Grandee of Spain on 3 November 1982, married on 12 May 1975 to María de los Reyes de Marcos y Sánchez (b. Madrid, 6 January 1955), and had issue:
  - Torcuato Enrique Fernández-Miranda y de Marcos (b. 26 February 1983)
  - Alvaro Manuel Fernández-Miranda y de Marcos (b. 23 August 1985)
- Fernando Fernández-Miranda y Lozana (b. Gijón, 20 January 1953), married to Ana Allendesalazar y Ruíz de Arana (b. Madrid, 27 July 1962), daughter of Carlos Allendesalazar y Travesedo (Madrid, 30 June 1923 – 24 March 1994), ?th Viscount of Tapia and a descendant of Maria Cristina of the Two Sicilies, and wife Ignacia Ruíz de Arana y Montalvo (Deusto, 11 August 1930 -), 14th Marchioness of Velada, and had issue:
  - Javier Fernández-Miranda y Allendesalazar
  - Clara Fernández-Miranda y Allendesalazar

Political offices
Preceded by Luis Carrero Blanco	Interim Prime Minister of Spain; 1973	Succeeded by Carlos Arias Navarro
Spanish nobility
New title	Duke of Fernández-Miranda; 31 May 1977 – 19 June 1980	Succeeded by Enrique Fernández-Miranda
