= Cortes Españolas =

Spanish Parliament (1942–1977)

Spanish Courts Cortes Españolas

Type
- Type: Unicameral

History
- Established: 17 July 1942
- Disbanded: 16 June 1977
- Preceded by: National Council
- Succeeded by: Cortes Generales
- Seats: 556

Meeting place
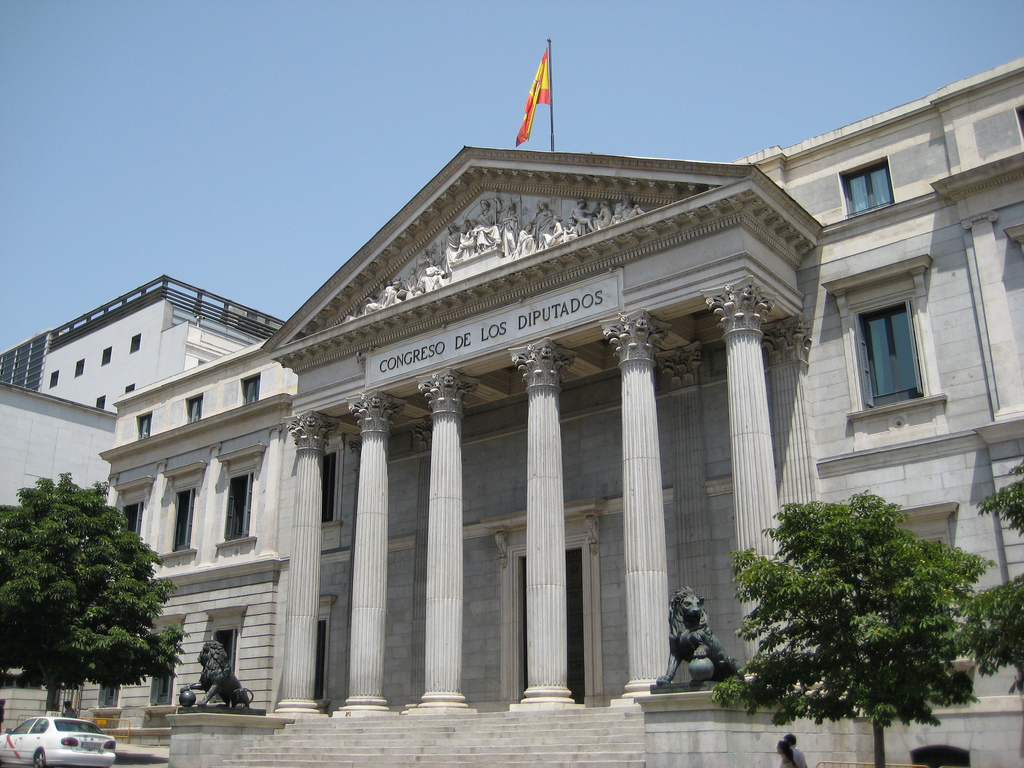
- Palace of the Cortes, Madrid

The Cortes Españolas (English: Spanish Courts), known informally as the Cortes franquistas (English: Francoist Courts), was the name of the legislative institution promulgated by the Caudillo of Spain Francisco Franco which was established on 17 July 1942 (the sixth anniversary of the start of the Spanish Civil War), and opened its first session eight months later on 17 March 1943. The Cortes sought to present itself as the highest organisational body for the Spanish people and to participate in the work of the State (Article 1A of the Constitutive Act of the Cortes, as amended by Act 1967 of the State in its third additional provision). Its members were known as procuradores (singular procurador), reviving a term used for legislators prior to the Napoleonic era.

The main function of the Cortes was the development and adoption of laws, but under its subsequent sanction reserved to the Head of State (Franco himself).

To identify itself as a continuation of the Spanish parliamentary tradition, the Cortes was seated at the Palace of the Cortes, Madrid. However, this institution had greater similarity with the corporate system of Italian fascism. Its members supposedly represented the various elements of Spanish society. The Cortes was not intended as the repository of national sovereignty, since all sovereign power was concentrated in the head of state (Caudillo), Franco, in the absence of separation of powers. The government was not responsible to it; ministers were appointed and dismissed by Franco alone. It also had no power over government spending.

== Classification of elected deputies since 1967 ==
Franco, during his long reign as Head of State, himself rejected any identification with liberal democracy. Instead, he conceived his system as a solvent ideology of national unity between social classes and territories. The procuradores were ex officio members, appointed by the Head of State or chosen from corporate entities, and until 1967 did not materialize the way of choosing a "third family" ("Third" was the conventional way of referring to the "organic" representation from "natural entities" considered the only possible channels for the expression of popular will – "family, town and union"). That was made available when the 1966 Organic Law of the State was passed by the Cortes and approved by referendum by majority voice, which finally established the third option - effectively reintroducing elected deputies to the Cortes for the first time since 1932, coupled with an Act of the Cortes that amended the 1942 Cortes Law which brought it in line with the new Organic Law.

Per the 1966 Organic Law, two family representatives from each region, elected by those who appear on the Electoral heads of households and married women in the manner established by the Fundamental Laws and other legislative Acts of the Cortes (majority was established, with different effects depending on the family situation – for males at age 21 and for women 25 in the referendum but did have the right to vote all men and women of the Nation over twenty years), would be elected to the Cortes for the same terms of 4 years as those of the non-elected deputies of the same.

Elections were held to cover that portion of the Deputies in the Cortes on 10 October 1967, and on 29 September 1971. In the 1971 election, the last in Franco's lifetime, there were 230 candidates were on the ballot for the 104 popularly-elected seats, representing one-fifth of the Cortes, and the other four-fifths were "designated, directly or indirectly, by the authorities."

The elected deputies were required to be full members of the National Movement in good standing and have been residents of said province for a minimum period of 7 years since the age of 14 and have either over or are in the age of majority, among others. These deputies were provincial and territorial-at large in nature, with the constituencies covering the boundaries of said territorial unit as defined by law. City residents thus were required to vote for their area deputies.

== Classification of non-directly elected members of the Cortes ==
Outside the elected deputes since 1967, majority of the deputies of the Cortes outside members of the Cabinet, which were deputies ex-officio and were categorized as procuradores natos (directly appointed deputies), alongside the entire National Council of the Movement, also categorized under the previous, and clerical, military, administrative, civil service and functional deputies (up to 25 would be appointed), the last being titled as procuradores designados, were selected for four year terms.

The following were also ex-officio deputies:

- President of the Supreme Court
- President of the Court of Auditors
- Judge Advocate General of the Supreme Military Justice Court
- President of the Spanish Institute
- President, Spanish National Research Council
- President, Economic Council
- University rectors
- National Delegate of the Spanish Syndical Organization

The elected deputies of the Cortes (procuradores electivos de las Cortes), outside those post-1967 were elected directly, were:

- Deputies of the provincial councils (1 per provincial council, provincial at-large)
- Deputies of the Island Councils of the Canary Islands (1 deputy each)
- Deputies of the Spanish Sahara, Plazas de soberanía and until 1968 Spanish Guinea
- Members appointed by municipal councils (1 each per province, provincial at-large)
- Members appointed by city councils (1 deputy per city for a total of 7)

Until 1956 Spanish Morocco's government appointed its own deputies to the Cortes.

Alongside them were:

- 150 sectoral deputies appointed from the Spanish Syndical Organization
- Other sectoral representatives elected to the Cortes by sectoral organizations in the manner described by law
- Two members of the NRC
- Two deputies representing the Royal Academies elected to the Cortes in the manner described by law by members of the Institute and the Academies

These deputies would be either reelected or recalled out of their chamber by the end of their term by their appointing or electing bodies in the same manner.

== Presidents ==
No.	Portrait	Name (Birth–Death)	Term of office			Political party	Ref.
No.	Portrait	Name (Birth–Death)	Took office	Left office	Time in office	Political party	Ref.
1		Esteban de Bilbao Eguía (1879–1970)	16 March 1943	29 September 1965	22 years, 197 days	Movimiento Nacional	
2		Antonio Iturmendi Bañales (1903–1976)	29 September 1965	26 November 1969	4 years, 58 days	Movimiento Nacional	
3		Alejandro Rodríguez de Valcárcel (1917–1976)	27 November 1969	5 December 1975	6 years, 8 days	Movimiento Nacional	
4		Torcuato Fernández-Miranda (1915–1980)	6 December 1975	16 June 1977	1 year, 192 days	Movimiento Nacional	

== See also ==
- Cortes Generales
- Fundamental Laws of the Realm
- List of presidents of the Congress of Deputies
- Procurador en Cortes
