= Gabriel Pita da Veiga =

Spanish admiral

Minister of the Navy of Spain
- In office 12 June 1973 – 15 April 1977
- Prime Minister: Francisco Franco; Luis Carrero Blanco; Carlos Arias Navarro; Adolfo Suárez
- Preceded by: Adolfo Baturone Colombo
- Succeeded by: Pascual Pery

Personal details
- Born: Gabriel Pita da Veiga y Sanz; 31 January 1909 Ferrol, Galicia, Kingdom of Spain
- Died: 8 May 1993 (aged 84) Madrid, Spain

Military service
- Branch/service: Spanish Armed Forces
- Years of service: 1924–1993

Gabriel Pita da Veiga y Sanz (31 January 1909 – 8 May 1993) was a Spanish admiral who served as Minister of the Navy of Spain between 1973 and 1977, during the Francoist dictatorship.
