= José García Hernández =

Spanish governor and politician (1915–2000)

First Deputy Prime Minister and Minister of Interior
- In office 3 January 1974 – 12 December 1975
- Prime Minister: Carlos Arias Navarro
- Preceded by: Carlos Arias Navarro
- Succeeded by: Manuel Fraga

Personal details
- Born: 19 March 1915 Guadalajara
- Died: 5 February 2000 (aged 84) Madrid
- Party: FET y de las JONS
- Education: Complutense University of Madrid

José García Hernández (19 March 1915 – 5 February 2000) was a Spanish jurist and politician. He served as first deputy prime minister and interior minister of Francoist Spain from 1974 to 1975.

== Early life and education ==
García was born in Guadalajara on 19 March 1915. He graduated from Complutense University of Madrid receiving a degree in law.

== Career ==
Following his graduation García joined the corps of state lawyers in 1941. He worked at the treasury of Cuenca, Guadalajara, and then as a legal advisor at ministries of information and tourism and public works. He served as civil governor of various provinces, including Lugo and Las Palmas (1941–1956). He was the board chairman of Butano company. He was the director general of local administration between 1951 and 1957 at the Ministry of the Interior. He was a member of Parliament.

On 3 January 1974 he was appointed both first deputy prime minister and interior minister to the cabinet formed by Prime Minister Carlos Arias Navarro. He replaced Arias as interior minister. García was in office until 12 December 1975 when Manuel Fraga replaced him in both posts in a cabinet reshuffle. Until 1977 he worked as an attorney at the courts which he began in 1952. Following the end of his cabinet tenure he was also appointed vice president and then president of the Banco Exterior de España of which he was named as a director in 1970.

== Death and awards ==
García died in Madrid on 5 February 2000. He was the recipient of six Grand Crosses and Gold Medals from various Spanish provinces.
