= Ministry of Development Planning (Spain) =

- Ministerio de Planificación del Desarrollo

Agency overview
- Formed: June 12, 1973
- Dissolved: January 9, 1976
- Type: Ministry
- Jurisdiction: Government of Spain

The Ministry of Development Planning (Spanish: Ministerio de Planificación del Desarrollo) was a ministerial department of the Government of Spain that existed between 1973 and 1976 during the dictatorship of Francisco Franco to prepare, promote and monitor the execution of the Economic and Social Development Plans that were enforced throughout the period known as the Spanish miracle. Its first officeholder was Laureano López Rodó.
