= Deputy Prime Minister of Spain =

Second-highest position of the Government of Spain

(First) Deputy Prime Minister of Spain
- Vicepresidencia (Primera) del Gobierno de España
- Coat of arms of Spain

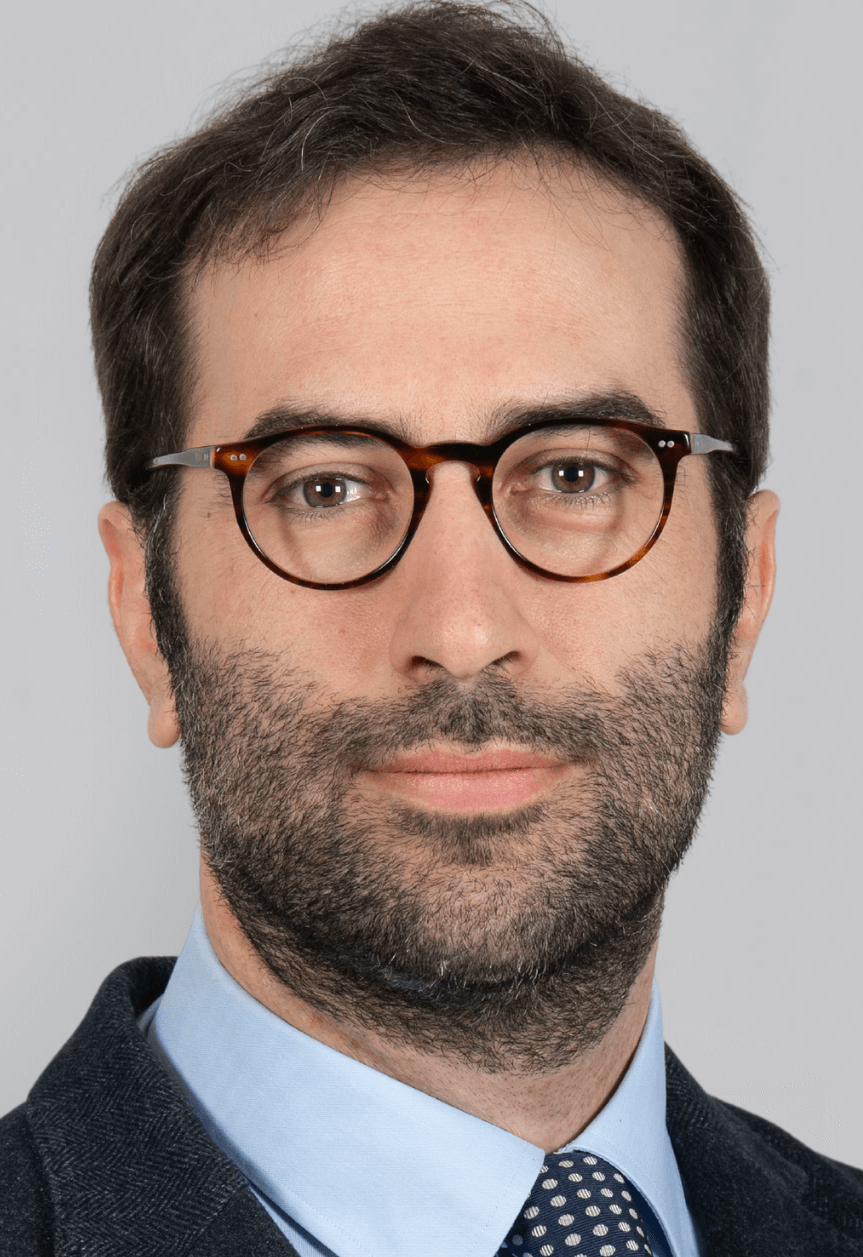
- Incumbent; Carlos Cuerpo since 27 March 2026
- Office of the Prime Minister
- Style: Excelentísimo/a Señor/a
- Member of: Council of Ministers
- Seat: Madrid, Spain
- Nominator: The Prime Minister
- Appointer: The Monarch; Countersigned by the Prime Minister
- Term length: No fixed term No term limits are imposed on the office.
- Constituting instrument: Constitution of 1978
- Formation: 3 October 1840 (185 years ago)
- First holder: Joaquín María Ferrer
- Succession: Second Deputy Prime Minister of Spain

The deputy prime minister of Spain, officially the vice president of the Government (Spanish: Vicepresidente del Gobierno), is the second in command to the prime minister, assuming the responsibilities of the premiership when the prime minister is absent or incapable of exercising power.

The deputy prime minister is usually handpicked by the prime minister from the members of the Council of Ministers and appointed by the Monarch before whom they take an oath. The deputy prime minister may be the head of a government department, but it depends on the will of the prime minister, who may have a deputy premier without a portfolio.

When there are more than one deputy prime minister, the officeholder is frequently referred to as the first deputy prime minister (Spanish: Vicepresidente primero del Gobierno). Since 2023, there are three deputy prime ministers; Carlos Cuerpo serves as first deputy prime minister since 27 March 2026 and as minister of Economy, Trade and Enterprise since 2023.

== History ==
The position of deputy prime minister dates back to the 19th century. On 3 October 1840, Queen Regent Maria Christina of the Two Sicilies, in the name of her daughter Queen Isabella II, and on the advice of the prime minister, The Duke of the Victory, issued a royal decree appointing Joaquín María Ferrer as "Vice President of the Council of Ministers".

However, after Ferrer's appointment as prime minister in May 1841, this position fell into oblivion and was not used again until 1925, when The Marquess of Estella transitioned from a military to a civil government, reestablishing the Council of Ministers, the Presidency of the Council of Ministers and re-creating the Vice Presidency. The vice president's function was to replace the president in cases of absence or illness. This vice-president, said article 3 of the Royal Decree, was appointed by the president from among the members of the Council of Ministers. The Vice Presidency was vested in the Under-Secretary of the Interior, Severiano Martínez Anido, who combined the position with that of Interior Minister.

In 1931, the Second Republic was established and, initially, it was not considered necessary to have a deputy prime minister. However, in December 1933, prime minister Alejandro Lerroux appointed Diego Martínez Barrio Vice President of the Council of Ministers, a position from which he resigned only three months later.

The Law of January 30, 1938, changed the title to "Vice President of the Government" and, with the formation of the first government of Francisco Franco, this position was granted to general Francisco Gómez-Jordana Sousa. From 1938 to 1981 the position was occupied by military officials, with the exception of the Duke of Fernández-Miranda (1973–1973) and José García Hernández (1974–1975). Since 1981, with a democracy markedly established in society, Prime Minister Calvo-Sotelo appointed a civilian as Deputy, definitively separating the military power from the executive power, a situation that remains today.

Furthermore, since the approval of the Organic Law of the State of 1967—articles 13(2) and 16(1)—, it has been possible to have more than one deputy prime minister, reaching up to four deputies in some periods. In these situations, the position of deputy prime minister is known as First Deputy Prime Minister (Spanish: Vicepresidente Primero del Gobierno).

== Responsibilities ==
As of 2026, the first deputy prime minister responsibilities are:

- Advising the prime minister.
- To replace the prime minister in the cases of vacancy, absence or illness.
- The exercise of the responsibilities entrusted by the prime minister.
- To chair the Government Delegated Committee for Economic Affairs.
- To chair the Government Delegated Committee for Intelligence Affairs.

== See also ==
- Second Deputy Prime Minister of Spain
- Third Deputy Prime Minister of Spain
- Fourth Deputy Prime Minister of Spain
