= Carlos Arias Navarro =

Prime Minister of Spain from 1973 to 1976

The Most Excellent Carlos Arias Navarro GE
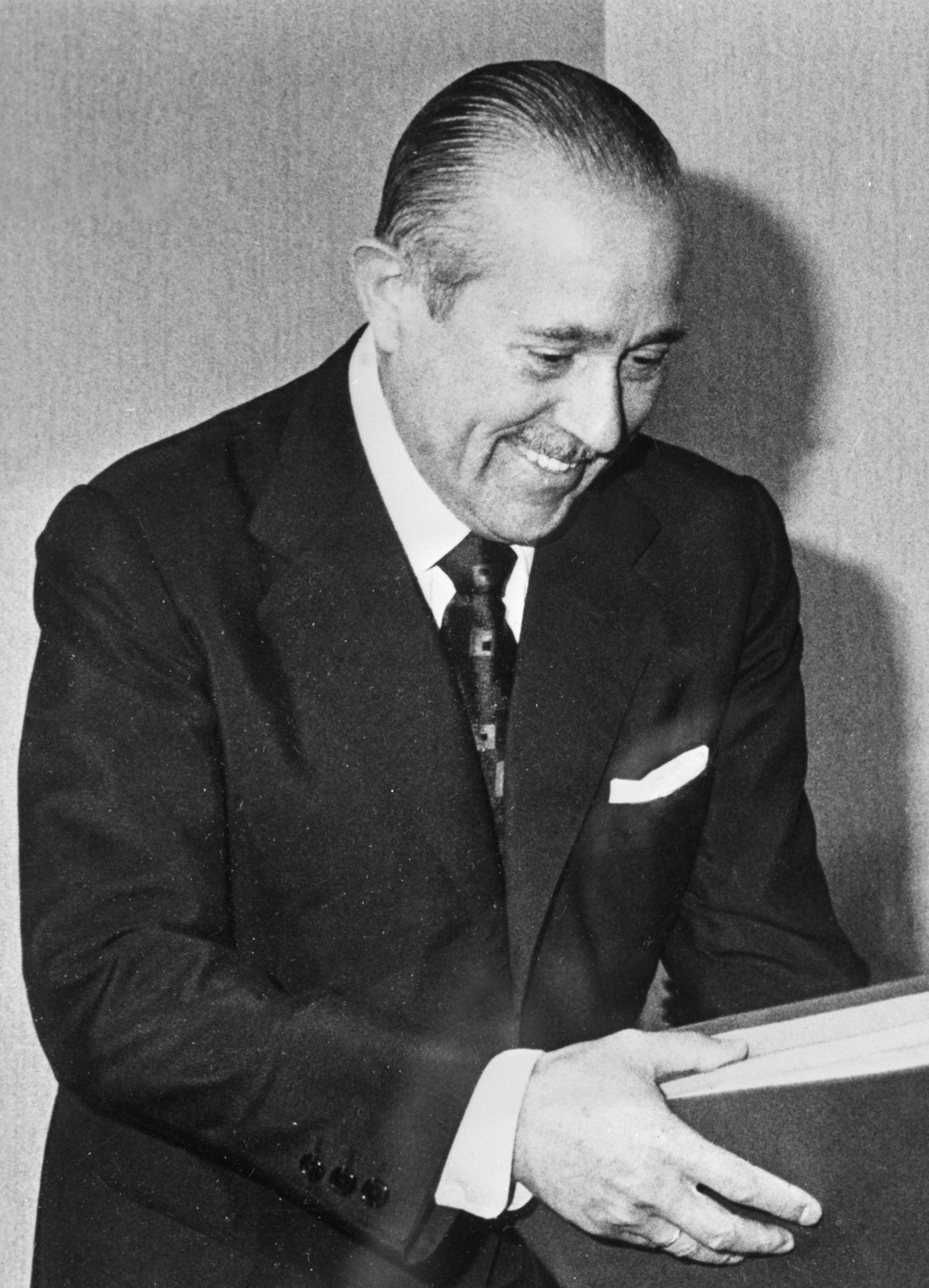
- Arias Navarro in 1975

Prime Minister of Spain
- In office 31 December 1973 – 1 July 1976
- Head of State: Francisco Franco (1973–1975); Juan Carlos I (1975–1976)
- Deputy: José García Hernández (1974–1975); Fernando de Santiago (1975–1976)
- Preceded by: Luis Carrero Blanco
- Succeeded by: Adolfo Suárez

Minister of Governance
- In office 12 June 1973 – 31 December 1973
- Prime Minister: Luis Carrero Blanco
- Preceded by: Tomás Garicano
- Succeeded by: José García Hernández

Mayor of Madrid
- In office 5 February 1965 – 12 June 1973
- Preceded by: José Finat y Escrivá de Romaní
- Succeeded by: Miguel Ángel García-Lomas

Director General of State Security
- In office 25 June 1957 – 5 February 1965
- Head of State: Francisco Franco
- Preceded by: Rafael Hierro Martínez
- Succeeded by: Mariano Tortosa Sobejano

Personal details
- Born: Carlos Arias Navarro; 11 December 1908 Madrid, Spain
- Died: 27 November 1989 (aged 80) Madrid, Spain
- Resting place: Mingorrubio Cemetery
- Party: FET y de las JONS (1936–1977); Popular Alliance (1977–1989); People's Party (1989)
- Spouse: María de la Luz del Valle y Menéndez

Carlos Arias Navarro, 1st Marquess of Arias Navarro (11 December 1908 – 27 November 1989), was a Spanish politician who was the Prime Minister of Spain from 1973 to 1976, serving during the final years of the Francoist era and the beginning of the country's transition to democracy.

Arias Navarro was a hardline politician and was involved in the White Terror, having signed thousands of death warrants during the dismantling of the Spanish Republic. Later, he was a more moderate leader during his premiership.

== Early life ==
Arias Navarro was born in Madrid on 11 December 1908. He served in the Ministry of Justice since 1929 as attorney in Málaga and Madrid.

== Francoist Spain ==
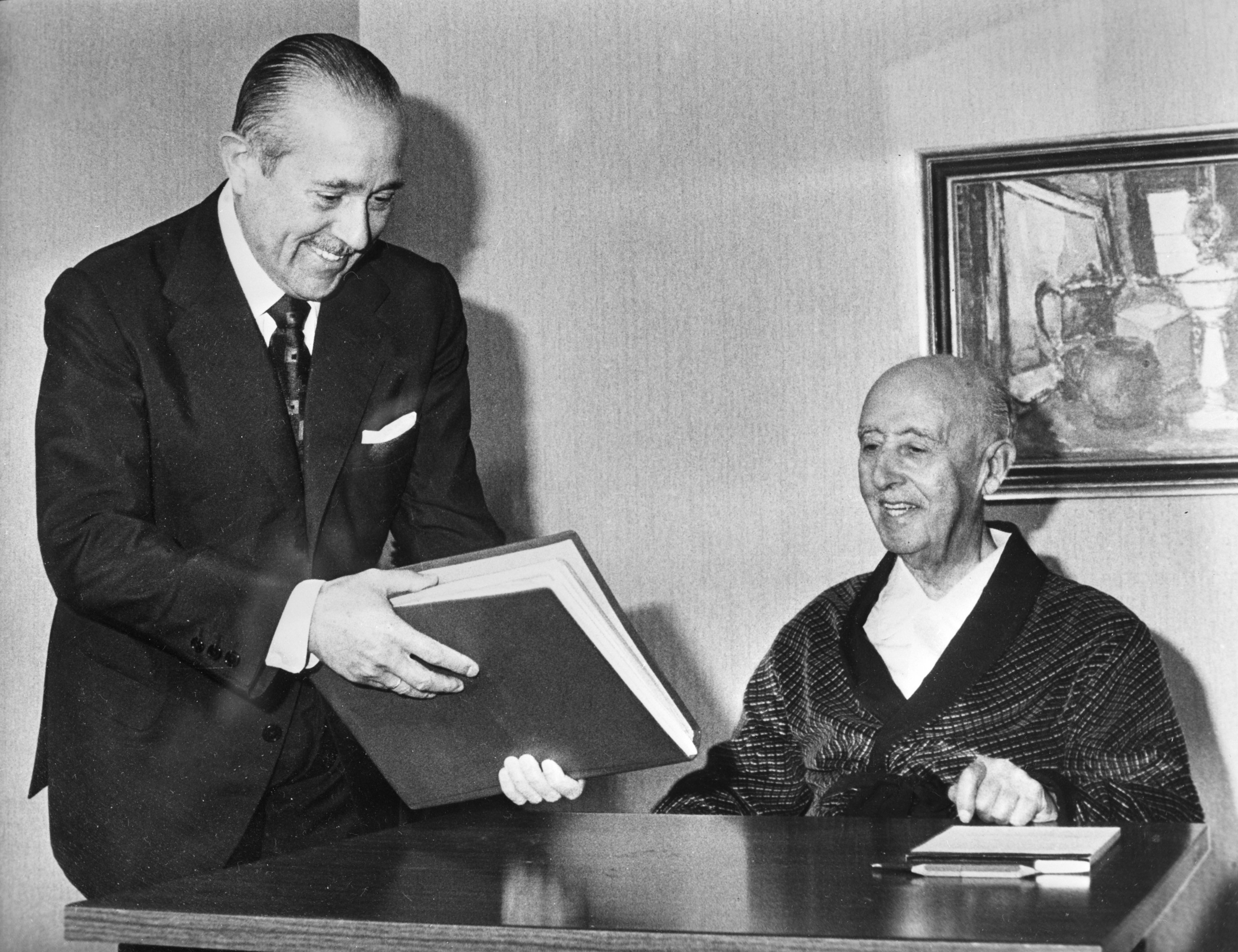
Arias Navarro and Franco in 1975

Arias was close to the right-wing sectors and joined the Francoist side during the Spanish Civil War. He was public prosecutor in the trials set up by the Francoists in Málaga after the conquest of the city. There, he earned the nickname the "Butcher of Málaga" (Carnicero de Málaga) for his role in the imposition of capital punishment to true or perceived sympathizers of the Republicans, In one of the harshest repressions following the Francoist victory, an estimated total of 17,000 people were summarily executed.

He married María de la Luz del Valle y Menéndez, without issue.

After serving in various positions, including Mayor of Madrid from 1965 to June 1973, Arias became Minister of Government (Minister of the Interior) in June 1973. After the assassination of Prime Minister (Presidente del Gobierno) Luis Carrero Blanco he was appointed his successor on 31 December 1973, a position he continued to hold after the death of Franco. Arias Navarro had the support of the Franco family, most notably Carmen Polo, and retained the post during the transition to democracy. However, the garroting of the Catalan anarchist Salvador Puig Antich in March 1974 had already shown his aversion to political liberalization, while other events, including the executions in September 1974, the organization of the Green March in November 1975 by King Hassan II of Morocco, and the illness and death of Franco (which Arias announced on television), displayed his weaknesses and further eroded his authority.

Franco's successor as head of state, King Juan Carlos I, continued his appointment, so that it was his government (which included Manuel Fraga Iribarne and José María de Areilza) that instituted the first reforms, however unwillingly. He tried to continue Franco's late policies, opposing any change. After a lengthy power struggle, Juan Carlos forced his resignation on 1 July 1976.

The next day, the King granted him the hereditary title of Marqués de Arias Navarro (English: Marquess of Arias Navarro), together with the dignity Grande de España (English: Grandee of Spain). On his death, the title of Marquess was inherited by his nephew Miguel Ángel Arias-Navarro.

Arias was succeeded by Adolfo Suárez, named general secretary of the Francoist official party Movimiento Nacional in December 1975. In June 1977, during the first free general elections held since 1936, Arias joined the Alianza Popular, a right-wing party created by Manuel Fraga. He then led the Búnker group of hard-liners opposed to any reforms, along with the leader of the Francoist party Fuerza Nueva, Blas Piñar. Arias, however, never again occupied a relevant position in the later Spanish government.

Both left and extreme right attacked him, calling him by the nickname "The Old Pusillanimous".

== Later years ==
In his first democratic election his party joined the Popular Alliance (AP), led by Manuel Fraga, running as a senate candidate for Madrid, but he was not elected.

Arias Navarro died on 27 November 1989 at 80 years of age from an infarction, and was buried at Mingorrubio Cemetery in El Pardo. His wife died in 1997.

== Spain and Portugal ==
According to the Spanish daily El País, files released by the US National Archives and Records Administration show that, following the left-wing Carnation Revolution in Portugal on 25 April 1974, Arias met with the United States Deputy Secretary of State Robert S. Ingersoll in March 1975 and offered to invade Portugal in order to stop the spread of communism. The report Ingersoll forwarded to the then-Secretary of State, Henry Kissinger, on 18 March, stated that "appropriate steps" were being taken to ensure that "the events in Portugal did not cross the border into Spain."

Ingersoll went on to add that Spain wanted Washington to support Spain in the event of war, precisely at a time when the US was renegotiating the status of its military bases, and Arias wanted Washington to support Spain's future membership of NATO.

Political offices
| Preceded by José Finat y Escrivá de Romaní | Mayor of Madrid; 1965–1973 | Succeeded by Miguel Angel García-Lomas Mata |
| Preceded by Tomás Garicano Goñi | Minister of Government; 1973–1974 | Succeeded by José García Hernández |
| Preceded by Torcuato Fernández-Miranda (acting) | Prime Minister of Spain; 1973–1976 | Succeeded by Fernando de Santiago y Díaz (acting) |
Spanish nobility
| New title | Marquess of Arias Navarro; 1976–1989 | Miguel Ángel Arias-Navarro y Villegas |
