= Movimiento Nacional =

Governing institution of Spain (1937–1977)

Flags of the National Movement

Rojigualda (Spanish national flag)

Flag of the Falangist Movement

Flag of the Traditionalist Movement

The Movimiento Nacional (English: National Movement), or simply the Movimiento (English: Movement), was the self-designation of the FET y de las JONS (Falange), the ruling party of Francoist Spain, the bureaucratic structures of the Falange, and in the general sense of the whole Francoist regime. It was an ambiguous term which in essence denoted a nominal "body to which one had to adhere" in order to participate in the official politics of the regime. It followed a doctrine of corporatism in which only so-called "natural entities" could express themselves. It was abolished in 1977.

== Composition ==
The Movimiento Nacional was primarily composed of:

- The sole legal party, called Falange Española Tradicionalista y de las Juntas de Ofensiva Nacional Sindicalista (FET y de las JONS) which had been created at the beginning of the Spanish Civil War. Other parties were prohibited (the sole name of "party" was prohibited to design any type of organization). Government officials, military officers and trade unionists of the state trade union automatically became members of the party, although their membership was often purely nominal.
  - The sole trade union organization, called Organización Sindical Española (OSE, popularly known as the Sindicato Vertical), defined as the junior organization of FET y de las JONS, composed of corporatist organizations which gathered employers and workers, in opposition to Marxism's class warfare.
- All civil servants and holders of public office, were requested to swear an oath to the Principles of the National Movement.

== Leadership ==
The National Movement was led by Francisco Franco, titled Jefe del Movimiento (English: Chief of the Movement), assisted by a "Minister-Secretary General of the Movement". The hierarchy extended itself to all of the country, with a "local chief of the movement" named in each village.

== Ideology ==
People who strongly identified with the Movimiento Nacional were colloquially known as Falangistas or Azules ("Blues"), from the colour of the shirts worn by the Falange Militia, José Antonio Primo de Rivera's fascist organization created during the Second Spanish Republic. Camisas viejas (Old shirts) enjoyed the honour of being historical members of the Falange, compared to Camisas nuevas (New shirts), who could be accused of opportunism.

The ideology of the Movimiento Nacional was summed up by the slogan ¡Una, Grande y Libre!, which stood for the indivisibility of the Spanish state and the refusal of any regionalism or decentralization, its imperial character, both past (the defunct Spanish Empire in the Americas) and foreseen (in Africa), and its independence towards the purported "Judeo-Masonic-Marxist international conspiracy" (a personal obsession of Franco), materialized by the Soviet Union, the European democracies, the United States (until the Pact of Madrid of 1953), or the "exterior enemy" which could threaten the nation at any time; as well as towards the long list of "internal enemies", like "anti-Spanish", "reds", "separatists", "liberals", "Jews" and "Freemasons", among others, coining expressions like "judeomarxistas".

== Francoist "families" ==
Since one-party rule was enforced in Francoist Spain, the only practical expression of pluralism consisted in the mixture of internal "families" (Familias del Regimen) competing together inside the National Movement. These roughly included four "families" with a genealogy tracing back to the right-wing political groups in the interwar period: the Falangists (or azules, originally from the Fascist FE de las JONS), with a preeminence over FET y de las JONS, the Spanish Syndical Organization (OSE), and the "social" government areas; the Carlists (issued from Traditionalist Communion), who held a tight control over the Ministry of Justice; the monarchist Alfonsines (issued from Renovación Española and Acción Española), well connected to the economic elites and the military command; and the National Catholics, "Catholics" in the sense of closely linked to politically Catholicist entities serving the Church's interests (issued from CEDA), embodied by the National Catholic Association of Propagandists (ACNP). In addition, a new family emerged in the 1950s, the technocrats, conservatives linked to the Opus Dei who embraced a businesslike approach to the administration of the state.

Franco held his power by balancing these internal rivalries, cautious not to show any favoritism to any of them nor compromise himself too much to anyone.

Fractions of those families eventually migrated to dissident stances. These included examples such as the intermittent dissent of a part of the Alfonsist monarchists who vouched for an immediate coronation of Juan de Borbón as king, as well as a sizeable part of the Catholicist family joining by late Francoism the opposition to the dictatorship subsumed within Christian democratic groups.

== Minister-Secretaries General of the Movement ==
No.	Portrait	Name (Birth–Death)	Term of office			Ref.
No.	Portrait	Name (Birth–Death)	Took office	Left office	Time in office	Ref.
1		Raimundo Fernández-Cuesta (1896–1992)	4 December 1937	9 August 1939	1 year, 248 days	
2		Agustín Muñoz Grandes (1896–1970)	9 August 1939	16 March 1940	220 days	
Position vacant (16 March 1940 – 19 May 1941)
3		José Luis Arrese (1905–1986)	19 May 1941	20 July 1945	4 years, 62 days	
Position vacant (20 July 1945 – 5 November 1948)
(1)		Raimundo Fernández-Cuesta (1896–1992)	5 November 1948	15 February 1956	7 years, 102 days	
(3)		José Luis Arrese (1905–1986)	15 February 1956	25 February 1957	1 year, 10 days	
4		José Solís Ruiz (1913–1990)	25 February 1957	29 October 1969	12 years, 246 days	
5		Torcuato Fernández-Miranda (1915–1980)	29 October 1969	3 January 1974	4 years, 66 days	
6		José Utrera Molina (1926–2017)	3 January 1974	11 March 1975	1 year, 67 days	
7		Fernando Herrero Tejedor (1920–1975)	11 March 1975	12 June 1975 #	93 days	
(4)		José Solís Ruiz (1913–1990)	13 June 1975	11 December 1975	181 days	
8		Adolfo Suárez (1932–2014)	12 December 1975	6 July 1976	207 days	
9		Ignacio García López (1924–2017)	7 July 1976	13 April 1977	280 days	

== Electoral history ==
Election	Leading candidate	Cortes Españolas				Government
Election	Leading candidate	Votes	%	Seats	+/–	Government
1967	Francisco Franco			564 / 564	0	Sole legal party
1971	Francisco Franco	7,294,134	100.00	561 / 561	▼3	Sole legal party

== See also ==
- Grand Council of Fascism, governing body of Fascist Italy
- José Larrañaga Arenas
- Mottos of Francoist Spain
- Nationalist faction (Spanish Civil War)
- Nationalist zone (Spanish Civil War)
