= List of Civil Order of Alfonso X, the Wise recipients =

People who received Spanish civil order

This is the list of recipients of the Civil Order of Alfonso X, the Wise:

== Collar ==
- Francisco Franco (1939) Spanish dictator
- António de Oliveira Salazar, Prime Minister of Portugal (1949)
- Manuel Gonçalves Cerejeira, Cardinal-Patriarch of Lisbon (1949)
- José Ibáñez Martín (1951)
- José María Velasco Ibarra, President of Ecuador (1955)
- Ramón Menéndez Pidal (1959)
- Hassan II of Morocco (1989)

since 1990 no conferments.

== Grand Cross ==
=== 1940 ===
- José Agustín Pérez del Pulgar (a título póstumo).
- Darío Fernández Iruega
- Miguel Asín Palacios
- Felipe Clemente de Diego
- Silvestre Sancho
- Tomás Tascón
- Antonio de Gregorio Rocasolano
- Joaquín María Castellarnau y Llopart
- José García Siñériz
- Manuel de Falla
- Ignacio Zuloaga Zabaleta
- Fernando Álvarez de Sotomayor
- Pedro Muguruza Otaño
- Fernando Enriques de Salamanca

=== 1941 ===
- Leonardo Santa Isabel
- Ignacio María Smith Ibarra
- Juan Irigoyen Guerricabeitia
- Enrico Conde di San Martino Valperga
- José Arce
- Adolf Schulten
- Carlos Francisco Benítez Dalfó

=== 1942 ===
- Joaquín Turina Pérez.
- Eduardo Marquina
- Wenceslao González Oliveros
- Manuel Gómez-Moreno Martínez

=== 1943 ===
- Pío Zabala y Lera
- Eduardo Callejo de la Cuesta
- Modesto López Otero

=== 1944 ===
- Jacinto Benavente
- Bernardo de Granda Calleja
- Eduardo Chicharro y Agüera
- Manuel Benedito y Vives
- Mario Figueredo
- Carlos Jiménez Díaz
- Francisco Gómez del Campillo
- Fernando Rodríguez Fornos
- Mariano Benlliure y Gil
- Clementina Albéniz Pascual

=== 1945 ===
- Leonardo de la Peña y Díaz
- Gustavo Cordeiro Ramos
- José Gascón y Marín
- José Mariano Mota Salado
- Juan Marcilla Arrazola
- Aurelio María Escarré
- Víctor Espinós Moltó
- Felipe Garin Ortiz de Taranco

=== 1946 ===
- Arcadio Larraona Saralegui
- Antonio Pereira Sousa de Cámara
- Arnald Steiger
- Anselmo Albareda
- Cruz Ángel Gallástegui Unamuno
- Miguel Odriozola Pietas
- Aurelio María Espinosa
- Archer Milton Huntington
- José Luis Gómez Navarro
- Eduardo Torroja Miret
- Eduardo de Vitoria
- Conrado del Campo
- José Martínez Ruiz

=== 1947 ===
- Dulce María Loynaz
- José María Bover
- Daniel Blanxart Pedrals
- Albino González
- José Gálvez Ginachero
- Ramón Castroviejo Briones
- Narciso Correal y Freyre de Andrade
- José Antonio Lezcano y Ortega
- Severino Aznar Embid

=== 1948 ===
- Fernando de Andrade y Pires de Lima
- Pío García Escudero y Fernández de Urrutia
- José María Pemán y Pemartín
- Rafael Sánchez Mazas
- Concepción Espina Tagle
- Moisés Bensabat Amzalak
- Enrique R. Larreta
- Alexander Fleming
- Blanca de los Ríos
- José Iturbi
- Belisario Gache Pirán
- José Nicoláu Sabater

=== 1949 ===
- José Joaquín Casas
- Jorge Beristain
- Maximino José de Morces Correia
- Cristóbal Losada y Puga
- José Pizzardo
- Antonio de la Torre y del Cerro
- Carlos Blanco Soler
- Esteban Terradas Illa
- Julio de Urquijo e Ibarra
- José Caeiro da Mata
- António Faria Carneiro Pacheco
- Nicolás Franco Bahamonde
- Eugenio Cuello Calón

=== 1950 ===
- José Castán Tobeñas
- José María Fernández-Locheda y Menéndez-Valdés
- José María Albareda y Herrera
- Agustín González de Amezúa y Mayo
- Taha Hussein Bey

=== 1951 ===
- Antonio Fernández Rodríguez
- H. van Waeyenbergh
- Enrique Luño Peña
- Cayetano Mergelina Luna
- Antonio Marín Ocete
- Sabino Alvárez-Gendín Blanco
- Jesús Rubio y García-Mina
- Luis Ortiz Muñoz
- José María Escrivá
- Justo Pérez de Urbel
- José López-Ortiz
- Carlos Ruiz García
- Antonio Elola Olaso
- Federico Marés Deulovol
- Esteban Madruga Jiménez
- Pedro Dulanto
- Juan Mendoza Rodríguez
- Francisco Javier Sánchez Cantón
- Manuel Suárez y Suárez

=== 1952 ===
- Rafael Cort Alvarez
- Rafael Azula Barrera
- José Vascongadas Calderón
- Pedro Calmón Monia de Bittencourt
- Nayi al-Asil
- Silverio de Santa Teresa
- Benjamín de Arriba Castro
- Daniel Llorente y Federico
- Bartolomé Pérez Casas
- Francisco Martín Lagos
- Jamil al Madfai
- Hunter Guthrie
- Mili Porta
- Eugenio d'Ors y Rovira
- Juan Vigón Suerodíaz
- Carlton Joseph Huntley Hayes
- Daniel Vázquez Díaz
- Jesús Guridi Vidaola
- Francisco Barbado y Viejo

=== 1953 ===
- Vittorino Veronese
- Roque Esteban Scarpa
- Pablo Laloux Van-der-Heyden-a-Hauzeur
- Mariano Ibérico Rodríguez
- José Ramón Guizado
- Felipe Ferreiro
- Blas Pérez González
- Joaquín Rodrigo Vidre
- José Cubiles Ramos
- Gustavo Urrutia González
- Andrés Segovia
- Juan Zaragüeta Bengoechea
- Crisanto Luque
- Carlos María de la Torre
- Joaquín Balaguer
- Ángel Ayala
- Manuel Cavaleiro de Ferreira
- Geronima Pecson
- Lorenzo Riber Campíns

=== 1954 ===
- Jaime Eyzaguirre
- José Cantos Figuerola
- Antonio Marín Hervás
- Mariano Ossorio Arévalo
- Gustavo Martínez Zubiría
- Manuel Lora Tamayo
- Carlos González Iglesias
- Daniel Henao y Henao
- Antonio Tovar Llorente
- Hermenegildo Anglada Camarasa
- Rafael García Rodríguez
- Francisco de P. Navarro Martín
- Manuel González Martí
- Henri Breuil
- Pedro Troncoso Sánchez
- José Martínez Cobo
- Víctor G. Urrutia
- Oscar Miró Quesada
- Francisco Graña Reyes
- Agustín Marín y Bertrán de Lis
- Carlos García Oviedo
- Ángel Arrúe Astiazarán

=== 1955 ===
- Ramón María Aller Ulloa
- José Cartañá y Anglés
- Wenceslao Benitez Inglott (a título póstumo)
- Rafael Bernal Jiménez
- Javier Baeza
- Edgar Rego dos Santos
- B. Velloso
- Alejandro Gallinal Heber
- Camilo Alonso Vega
- Enrique Romero de Torres
- Jaime Nebot Velasco
- Luis Olariaga Pujana
- José González de la Peña y de la Encina
- Joaquín González de la Peña y de la Encina
- Vicente Lores
- Agostino Gemelli
- Pedro Gonzáles Rincones
- José Loreto Arismendi
- Enrique de Marchena y Dujarrie
- José María Cuenco
- Braz de Souza Arruda
- Luis Martínez Miltos
- Óscar Herrera Palacios
- José Cándido de Motta Fillio
- Aurelio Cayceda Ayerbe

=== 1956 ===
- Gilberto Marinho
- Alberto Zerega Pombona
- Clovis Salgado
- Juan Gavala Laborde
- Víctor Escribano García
- Jaime Pujiula Dilme
- Joaquín Ruíz-Giménez Cortés
- Juan Manzano y Manzano
- José Solís Ruiz
- Pedro Gual Villalbí
- Julián Pemartín Sanjuán
- Enrique de Guzmán Martínez
- Patricio Palomar Collado

=== 1957 ===
- Rafael Leónidas Trujillo Molina
- Francisco Planell Riera
- José Antonio Artigas Sanz
- Celso Da Rocha Miranda
- Raúl Peña
- Marcelo José das Neves Alves Caetano
- Francisco Buscaróns Ubeda
- Segismundo Royo-Villanova y Fernández Cavada
- Mohamed bin Turki
- Lorenzo Miguélez Domínguez
- Pilar Primo de Rivera

=== 1958 ===
- Antonio Gallego Burín
- Emilio Gómez Ayáu
- Maurice van Hemeirijck
- Heinrich Drimmel
- John Cockoroft
- Ataúlfo Argenta (a título póstumo).
- Luis Alonso Muñoyerro
- Antonio Cortés Lladó

=== 1959 ===
- José María de Corral García
- Eduardo Toldrá Soler
- Óscar Esplá Triay
- José Capuz Mamano
- Joan Miró
- Valentín de Zubiaurre Aguirrezábal
- Ramón Gómez de la Serna
- Wenceslao Fernández Flórez
- José Yarnoz Larrosa
- José Entrecanales Ibarra
- Juan Gorostidi Alonso
- Ramón Iribarren Cabanillas
- Miguel Benlloch Martínez
- Gonzalo Ceballos Fernández de Córdoba
- Manuel de Torres Martínez
- Manuel Usandizaga Soraluce
- Emilio Díaz-Caneja Candanedo
- Rafael Vara López
- Jesús García Orcoyen
- Ramón María Roca Sastre
- Federico de Castro Bravo
- Carlos Ruiz del Castillo
- Luis Legaz Lacambra
- Ciriaco Pérez Bustamante
- José María Millás Vallicrosa
- Luis Pericot García
- Juan de Contreras y López de Ayala
- Antonio Romañá Pujó
- Ricardo San Juan Llosá
- César González Gómez
- José María Orts Aracil
- Antonio Ríus Miró
- Julio Rey Pastor
- Antonio Torroja Miret
- Jacques Chevalier

=== 1960 ===
- Juan Marino García-Marquina y Rodrigo
- Francisco García-Valdecasas Santamaría
- Agustín Pedro Pons
- José Pascual Vila
- José María de Sagarra y de Castellarnáu
- Juan María Bonelli Rubio

=== 1961 ===
- Abelardo Bonilla Baldares
- José Viñas Mey
- Fernando Martín-Sánchez Julián
- Rafael Calvo Rodés
- Juan Adsuara Ramos
- Juan Cabrera Felipe
- José Corts Grau
- Miguel Allúe Salvador
- Carlos Alberto Puigrredón
- Arturo Capdevila
- Javier Goerlich Lleó
- Antonio Magariños García
- Pascual Bravo Sanfeliú
- Joaquín Garrigues y Díaz-Cañabate
- Emilio Alarcos García
- Pedro Pineda Gutiérrez
- Joaquín Vargas Méndez
- Alfonso Ocampo Londoño
- René Schick
- Theodore von Kármán
- Antonio Revenga Carbonell
- Luis Martín de Vidales
- Enrique Giménez Girón
- Alfredo R. Vitolo
- Luis Jordana de Pozas
- Ricardo Montequi y Díaz Plaza
- Luis Almarcha Hernández
- Eduardo Hernández Pacheco y Estevan
- Octavio A. Vallarino

=== 1962 ===
- Louis Armand
- Eduardo Angulo Otaolaurruchi
- José Maldonado y Fernández del Torco
- Emilio Jimeno Gil
- Patricio Peñalver Bachiller
- Amandio Tabares
- Epifanio Ridruejo Botija
- Joao Pizarro Gabizo de Coelho
- Galo Sánchez y Sánchez

=== 1963 ===
- Alberto Navarro González
- Alfonso Grosso Sánchez
- Aurelio Miró Quesada-Sosa
- Jean Roche
- Francisco García del Cid y Arias
- Francisco de Paula Leite Pinto
- Francisco Iñiguez Almech
- José L. Torrontegui e Ibarra
- Manuel Soto Redondo
- Arturo Rubinstein
- Vicente Martínez Risco y Agüero
- Ernesto Halffter Escriche
- Eduardo López Palop
- Piedad Novales Gomez

=== 1964 ===
- José Vives Gatell
- Ginés Guzmán Giménez
- Alfonso García Gallo
- Rafael de Balbín Lucas
- Armando G Melón y Ruiz de Gordejuela
- José Luis Rodríguez Candela
- Juan Luis de la Ynfiesta Molero
- Juan Manuel Martínez Moreno
- Enrique Gutiérrez Ríos
- Joaquín Calvo Sotelo
- Tomás García Figueras
- Antonio Pastor de la Meden
- Friedrich Balke
- Mariano Navarro Rubio
- Ignacio Barraquer y Barraquer
- Agustín Segura Iglesias
- José Sinués Urbiola
- Alfredo Silva Santiago
- Leonardo Prieto Castro
- Carl Schuricht
- Ángel Santos Ruiz
- Antonio Tena Artigas
- Manuel Batlle Vázquez
- Higinio Anglés Pamiés
- Diego Angulo Iñiguez
- Juan Antonio Suanzes Fernández
- Rafael García y García de Castro
- Nicanor Zabaleta Zala
- Luis Ceballos Fernández de Córdoba
- Clemente Sáez García
- Ramón Esteruelas Rolando
- José Camón Aznar
- Héctor Gros Espiell
- Abdel Kader Hatem

=== 1965 ===
- Emeterio Sendino de la Rosa
- Ramón Castilla Pérez
- José María Ríos García
- Fidel Jorge López Aparicio
- Santiago Alcobé Noguer
- Gabriel Alomar Esteve
- Luis Iglesias Iglesias
- Ángel Jorge Echeverri
- Carlos San López
- Felice Battaglia
- José Eugenio de Baviera y Borbón
- Ruperto Sanz y Sanz
- Emilio Novoa González
- Luis Martínez Kleiser

=== 1966 ===
- José Manuel González Valcárcel
- Gratiniano Nieto Gallo
- Enrique Costa Novella
- Antonio González y González
- Luis Bernaola Churruca
- Emilio Muñoz Fernández
- José Ortiz Echagüe
- Félix Hernández Giménez
- Leopoldo Querol Roso
- Francisco Hernández-Tejero Jorge
- José Castañeda Chornet
- Fernando de Castro Rodríguez
- Bernardo Houssay
- José Sansón Terán
- Ángel González Álvarez
- Joaquín Tena Artigas
- Ricardo Magdaleno Redondo
- Luis Menéndez Pidal Álvarez
- Alfonso Muñoz Alonso

=== 1967 ===
- José Manuel Rivas Sacconi
- Francisco Navarro Borrás
- Regino Sainz de la Maza
- Laureano López Rodó
- Manuel Cardenal Iracheta
- Alfonso de la Peña Pineda
- Marcelo Jorissen Breack
- José García Santesmases
- Cristino García Alfonso
- José Antonio Martínez de Villarreal
- Gerhard Stoltenberg
- Marcelino Olaechea Loizaga
- José Virgili Vinadé
- Vicente Puyal Gil
- Manuel Alvar López
- Antonio Calderón Quijano
- Augusto de Castro Sampaio Corte Real
- Mohammed Rzzal Salama
- Eduardo López Chávarri Marco
- Gerardo Diego Cendoya
- José Sebastián Bandarán
- Conrado Blanco Plaza
- Francisco Olid Maysounave
- Francisco Hernández Borondo

=== 1968 ===
- Saroit Okacha
- Antonio Ángel Valero Vicente
- Juan José Espinosa San Martín
- Jesús Romeo Gorría
- Joaquín Ocón García
- José María Guerra Zunzunegui
- Juan Puig-Sureda Saiz
- Máximo Cuervo Rodigales
- Isidoro Martín Martínez
- Vicente Aleixandre Ferrandis
- Manuel Sendagorta Aramburu
- Wifredo Ricart Medina
- José María Sánchez
- Vicente Mortes Alfonso
- Francisco Ponz Piedrafita
- Eleuterio González Zapatero
- José María Aguirre Gonzalo
- Oscar Pinochet
- Luis Arizmendi Espuñes
- Antonio Valero Vicente

=== 1969 ===
- Enrique Fontana Codina
- Félix Moreno de la Cova
- Baldomero Palomares Díaz
- José Paz Maroto
- Antonio Pérez Marín
- José Joaquín Viñals Guimerá
- Juan Echevarría Gangoiti
- José María Mendoza y Guinea
- Florentino Pérez Embid
- Agustín de Asís Garrote
- José María Muller y Abadal
- José María de Porcioles Colomer
- Gabriel Betancur Mejía
- Pedro Segú Martín
- Luis Sánchez Belda
- Eugenio López y López
- José Botella Llusiá
- Justiniano Casas Peláez
- Federico Mayor Zaragoza
- Manuel Jesús García Garrido
- José María Martínez Val
- Fernando Luis de Ybarra y López-Dóriga
- Adolfo Rincón de Arellano
- Gonzalo Fernández de la Mora y Mon
- Torcuato Fernández-Miranda
- Jaime Guasp Delgado
- Eduardo García de Enterría y Martínez Carande
- Francisco Antoli Candela
- Alfredo Arrisueño Cornejo
- Alfonso Arroyo Rebolly
- Javier Rubio García Mina
- José Ramón Pérez Alvarez-Ossorio
- Ricardo Díez Hochleitner
- Alberto Monreal Luque
- Juan Bosch Marín
- Federico Rodríguez Rodríguez
- Rafael Díaz-Llanos y Lecuona
- Carlos Ros Rico
- José María García-Lomas Cossío
- Francisco Ponz Piedrafita

=== 1970 ===
- José de Azeredo Perdigao
- Rafael Couchoud Sebastiá
- Isidoro Macabich Llobet
- Fernando Jorge Portillo Scharfhausen
- Carlos S. Muñoz Cabezón
- José Luis Villar Palasí
- Pedro Roselló Blanch
- José Ramón de Villa y Elizaga
- Carlos Pinilla Turiño
- Luis Suárez Fernández
- Jaime Campmany y Díez de Revenga
- Gregorio López Bravo
- Licinio de la Fuente y de la Fuente
- Manuel Albaladejo García
- Enrique de la Mata Gorostizaga
- Fermín Gutiérrez de Soto
- Domingo Liotta
- Frans Van Mechelen
- Albert Parisis
- Guillermo León Valencia
- Octavio Arizmendi Posada

=== 1971 ===
- José Luis Meilán Gil
- Vicente Villar Palasí
- Julio Salvador Díaz-Benjumea
- Ignacio Ribas Marqués
- Eduardo Primo Yufera
- Manuel Arias Senoseaín
- Pedro Enrique Le Clercq
- Lucio del Álamo Urrutia
- Pedro Aragoneses Alonso
- Manuel Durán Sacristán
- Fabián Estapé Rodríguez
- Juan García-Frías y Frías
- Juan Gich y Bech de Careda
- Francisco Javier Irastorza Revuelta
- Prudencio Dandín Carrasco
- Luis Nozal López
- Mariano Sebastián Herrador
- Adolfo Suárez González
- Emilio Garrigues y Díaz-Cañabate
- Joaquín Gutiérrez Cano
- José Utrera Molina
- Vicente Sierra y Ponce de León
- Andrés de la Oliva de Castro
- Luís Carlos Galán
- José Luis Cantini
- Alejandro Maldonado Aguirre
- Manuel Díez-Alegría Gutiérrez
- José María Torres Murciano

=== 1972 ===
- Juan Bautista Nieto Fernández
- Ulpiano González Medina
- Juan José Barcia Goyanes
- Víctor Buen Lozano
- Marcial Corral Arnaiz
- Félix Hernández Gil
- Eduardo Junco Mendoza
- Rafael Mendizábal Allende
- Luis Sánchez Agesta
- Gabriel Solé Villalonga
- Manuel Alonso Olea
- Florencio Valenciano Almoyna
- Emilio Larrodera López
- Francisco Gallego Balmaseda
- Gabriel Barceló Matutano
- Jesús Florentino Fueyo Álvarez
- Julio Martínez Santa-Olalla
- Alfredo Carpio Becerra
- Emilio Romero Gómez
- Blas Tello y Fernández-Caballero
- Arturo Caballero López
- Carlos Iglesias Selgas
- Antonio J. García y Rodríguez-Acosta
- Francisco Javier Carvajal Ferrer
- Juan Abelló Pascual
- Fernando Fuentes de Villavicencio
- Luis Martínez de Irujo y Artázcoz
- Fernando Martínez-Vara de Rey y Córdoba-Benavente
- Pío Cabanillas Gallas
- Antonio Puigvert Gorro
- Víctor Arroyo Arroyo
- José Pérez del Arco y Rodríguez

=== 1973 ===
- Manuel Fraga Iribarne
- Enrique Pérez-Hernández y Moreno
- Felipe Lucena Conde
- Ángel Hoyos de Castro
- Francisco Ruiz Jarabo
- Ramón Palacios Rubio
- Juan Materno Vázquez
- José Ramón de Masaguer Fernández
- Eduardo Guzmán Esponda
- Arturo Fernández Cruz
- José Aguilar Peris
- Carlos Arias Navarro
- Rafael Baguena Candela
- Manuel Clavero Arévalo
- Gabriel Ferraté Pascual
- José Luis Ramos Figueras
- José Ramón del Sol Fernández
- Carlos Felice Cardot
- Alberto Wagner de Reyna
- José Ignacio San Martín López
- Ramón Calatayud Sierra
- Edgard Sanabria Arcia
- Francisco Arán López
- Efrén Borrajo Dacruz
- Carlos González-Bueno y Bocos
- José Luis Taboada García

=== 1974 ===
- Fernando Martorell Otzet
- Helmut Schlunk
- Luis Alberto Sánchez Sánchez
- Manuel F. Rocheta
- Antonio Pinilla Sánchez Concha
- Juan de Dios Guevara Romero
- Alberto F. Cañas Escalante
- Manuel Souto Vilas
- Ángel Scandella García Otermín
- Enrique Pérez Comendador
- Santiago Pardo Canalís
- Ignacio Martel Viniegra
- Juan Bautista Manya Alcoverro
- Ciríaco Laguna Serrano
- Guillermo Guastavino Gallent
- Ricardo García de Carellán y Ugarte
- Agustín Vicente Gella
- Gabriel Tous Amorós
- Vicente Lozano López
- Mariano Lázaro Franco
- Jesús Hernández Perera
- Jorge Carreras Llansana
- José Giménez Mellado
- Francisco J. Saraleguí Platero
- José Luis García Garrido
- Jesús Sancho Rof
- Nicolás Cabrera Sánchez
- Ignacio Agustí Peypoch
- Juan Oró Florensa
- Emilio Orozco Díaz
- Eduardo Ortiz de Landázuri
- Francisco Guijarro Arrizabalaga
- Leonardo Legaspi
- Justino Sansón Balladares
- Carlos P. Rómulo
- Mohamed Al Nueser
- María Elvira Muñiz
- Enrique Pérez Olivares
- Tomás Polanco Alcántara
- Pedro Pablo Bárnola

=== 1975 ===
- José Luis Messía Jiménez
- Luis Martín-Ballesteros y Costea
- Ramón Otero Pedrayo
- Angel Vián Ortuño
- César Albiñana García-Quintana
- Eugenio Lostau Román
- Francisco Luis López Carballo
- Miguel Ramón Izquierdo
- Manuel Valentín Gamazo y de Cárdenas
- Enrique Segura Iglesias
- José Miguel Gamboa Loyarte
- Enrique Fuentes Quintana
- Vicente Quílez Fuentes
- Antonio de Juan Abad
- Adib Lujami
- Antonio Gallego Morell
- Mariano Jaquotot Uzuriaga
- Obdulio Fernández Rodríguez
- Manuel Moreno López
- Raimundo Pérez-Hernández y Moreno
- Benito Rodríguez Ríos
- Alberto Sols García
- Montserrat Caballé
- María Luisa Caturla y Caturla
- Luis Moreno Salcedo
- Shozo Hotta
- Angel Martínez Fuertes
- Horacio Julio Bustamante Gómez
- José Blat Gimeno
- Juan de Arespacochaga y Felipe
- Álvaro Gil Varela

=== 1976 ===
- Paul Mikat
- Guillermo Morón Montero
- Antonio Barbadillo y García de Velasco
- José María Vidal Llenas
- Alfonso Martín Escudero
- José García Fernández
- Miguel Romero Moreno
- Rafael Leoz de la Fuente
- Miguel Lucas Tomás
- Eloy López García
- Manuel Hidalgo Huertas
- Vital Aza Fernández-Nespral
- Gabriel Artero Guirao
- José Luis Álvarez Sala Moris
- Luis Alonso-Castrillo y Aladren
- Luis Pescador del Hoyo
- Julio Ortiz Vázquez
- Sixto Obrador Alcalde
- Antonio Edo Quintana

=== 1977 ===
- Marcelo Terceros Banzer
- Gonzalo J. Facio Segreda
- Fernando Volio Jiménez, Ministro de Educación Pública de Costa Rica
- Arístides Royo, Ministro de Educación de Panamá
- Leopoldo Benítez Vinueza
- Dámaso Alonso y Fernández de las Redondas
- Ramón Carande y Thovar
- Fermín García Bernardo y de la Sala
- Antonio González-Meneses y Meléndez
- José María Hueso Ballester
- Fernando Rodríguez-Avial Azcunaga
- Martín Santos Romero
- Alfonso de la Serna y Gutiérrez Repide
- Federico Sopeña Ibáñez
- Alfred Verdross
- Ramón Areces Rodríguez
- Antonio Lecuona Hardison
- Juan de Dios López González
- Manuel Olivencia Ruiz
- Justo Pastor Rupérez
- Pedro Pi Calleja
- Manuel Suárez Perdiguero
- Roberto Terradas Vía
- Rodrigo Uría González
- Robert de Boisseson, Jefe de la Delegación Francesa de la Comisión Límite Pirineos, ex Embajador de Francia en España
- José Marín Cañas, Presidente del Instituto Costarricense de Cultura Hispánica
- Carmen Naranjo

=== 1978 ===
- Vicente García de Diego
- Christian Beullac
- Otto Eléspuru Revoredo
- Abelardo Algora Marco
- Ursicino Álvarez Suárez
- Pedro Laín Entralgo
- Julián Marías Aguilera
- Nicanor Piñole Rodríguez
- Mariano Rodríguez-Avial y Azcunaga
- Andrés Suárez y Suárez
- Miguel Allue Escudero
- Antonio Hernández Gil
- Salvador de Madariaga Rojo
- Valentín Matilla Gómez
- Gabriel Sánchez de la Cuesta y Gutiérrez
- José Joaquín Sancho Dronda
- Ángel Verdasco García
- Eduardo García-Rodeja Fernández

=== 1979 ===
- Ahmadu Mahtar M'Bow
- Renán Flores Jaramillo
- Rodolfo Barón Castro
- Enrico Cerulli
- Gustavo García de Paredes
- Luis Alberto Machado
- Claudio Sánchez-Albornoz y Menduiña
- Luis Díez del Corral y Pedruzo
- Aurelio Menéndez Menéndez
- Narciso Murillo Ferrol
- José Ortiz Díaz
- Pablo Sanz Pedrero
- Víctor L. Urquidi

=== 1980 ===
- Eduardo de Mattos Portella
- Jacques Lassaigne
- Pedro Barceló Torrent
- Arturo Uslar Pietri
- Antonio Domínguez Ortiz

=== 1981 ===
- Víctor García Hoz
- Carmen Romano de López-Portillo, primera dama de México.

=== 1982 ===
- José Antonio de Bonilla y Mir
- Miguel Vizcaíno Márquez
- Carlos Asensio Bretones
- Emilio Martín Martín
- Gilberto Freyre
- Carlos Alban Holguin
- Hermenegildo Baylos Corroza
- Rodrigo García-Conde y Huerta
- Juan Obiols Vie
- Joaquín María de Aguinaga Torrano
- Jesús Aguirre y Ortiz de Zárate
- Emiliano José Alfaro Arregui
- Julio Rodríguez Villanueva
- Angel Antonio Lago Carballo
- Saturnino de la Plaza Pérez
- Manuel Utande Igualada
- Fernando Valderrama Martínez
- Ruperto Andués Fuertes
- Francisco Arance Sánchez
- Victoriano Colodrón Gómez
- Manuel de Puelles Benítez
- Juan Antonio Samaranch Torelló
- Joaquín Colomer Sala
- Carlos Chagas Filho
- Enrique Fernández Caldas
- Roberto Marinho
- Guilherme Oliveira Figueiredo
- Francisco Javier Vallaure y Fernández Peña
- Abel Barahona Garrido
- Faustino Rubalcaba Troncoso
- Guillermo Colom Casasnovas
- Juan Corominas Vigneaux
- Vicente Gilsanz García
- Faustino Gutiérrez-Alviz y Armario
- César Pemán Pemartín
- Vicente Sánchez Araña

=== 1983 ===
- Jorge Luis Borges Acevedo
- Adnan Badran
- Francisco Grande Covián
- Rafael Lapesa Melgar
- Luis Solé Sabaris
- Sema Tanguiane
- Victoriano Luis Michelena Elissalt
- Raymond Carr
- Frederick J. Norton
- Silvio Zavala
- Georges Demerson

=== 1984 ===
- Joaquín Barraquer Moner
- Miguel Batllori Munné
- José Ferrater Mora
- Joseph Pérez
- Leopoldo Zea

=== 1985 ===
- José Prat García
- Mariano Aguilar Navarro
- José Cuatrecasas Arumi
- José Luis López Aranguren
- Enrique Ras Oliva
- Enrique Tierno Galván
- José María Valverde Pacheco

=== 1986 ===
- Octavio Paz

=== 1987 ===
- Santiago Grisolía García
- Alfredo Muiños Simón
- Emilio Alarcos Llorach
- Bartolomé Bennassar
- Francisco Bernis Madrazo
- Manuel Cardona Castro
- John Elliott
- Felipe González Vicén
- Emilio Lamo de Espinosa y Michels de Champourcin
- Emilio Lledó Íñigo
- Jordi Nadal Oller
- Felipe Ruiz Martín
- Gonzalo Torrente Ballester
- Juan Vila Valentí

=== 1988 ===
- Luis Gómez Llorente
- Marta Mata i Garriga
- Mariano Pérez Galán
- Eloy Terrón Abad
- Julia Vigre García
- Eulalia Vintro Castells
- Eduardo Nicol
- Adolfo Sánchez Vázquez
- Julio Caro Baroja

=== 1992 ===
- Manuel Broseta Pont

=== 1993 ===
- Soledad Ortega Spottorno
- Emilio García Gómez

=== 1994 ===
- María del Carmen Iglesias Cano
- Joaquim Veríssimo Serrao
- Iñigo Cavero Lataillade
- José Manuel Otero Novas
- Luis González Seara
- Juan Antonio Ortega y Díaz Ambrona
- José María Maravall Herrero
- Cayetano López Martínez
- Mohamed Kabbaj

=== 1995 ===
- Juan Vivancos Gallego
- José Ignacio Barraquer Moner
- José María Bricall Masip
- Martín González del Valle y Herrero
- Pedro Pascual de Sans
- Mariano Yela

=== 1996 ===
- Javier Solana Madariaga
- Manuel Tuñón de Lara
- Miguel Artola Gallego
- Pierre Vilar
- Jaime Lissavetzky Díez
- Álvaro Mutis
- Juan Marichal
- José Torreblanca Prieto
- Alfredo Kraus Trujillo
- Emilio Olabarría Muñoz
- Geoffrey Parker
- Jonathan Brown
- Santiago Gascón Muñoz
- Francisco Rodríguez Adrados

=== 1997 ===
- José Antonio González Caviedes
- Javier Benjumea Puigcerver
- John Brademas
- Fernando Lázaro Carreter
- José Luis Martínez Rodríguez
- Fernando Morán López
- Salvador Velayos Hermida
- Josep Vergés i Matas
- Yulla Halberstadt
- Marcos Guimerá Peraza

=== 1998 ===
- Pedro Miguel Echenique Landiríbar
- Guido Münch Paniagua
- Alfredo Pérez Rubalcaba
- Carlos Robles Piquer
- Jerónimo Saavedra Acevedo
- Antonio Sáenz de Miera López
- Gustavo Suárez Pertierra
- Antonio Fontán Pérez
- Carlos Egea Krauel
- Hans Meinke
- Mariano Fernández-Daza Fernández de Córdoba
- Fabio Roversi-Monaco

=== 1999 ===
- José Tomás Raga Gil
- Jaime Gil Aluja
- Pere Antoni Serra Bauzá
- Juan Salvat Dalmau
- Pere Vicens Rahola
- Arturo Ripstein Rosen
- Guillermo Luca de Tena y Brunet
- Francisco Pérez González
- Peter Schuler-Indermühle
- Juan Herrera Fernández
- Gonzalo Anes y Álvarez de Castrillón
- Rafael Benjumea y Cabeza de Vaca
- Rafael Cadórniga Carro
- Enrique Casado de Frías
- Jorge Cervós Navarro
- Salvador Claramunt Rodríguez
- Germán Colón Doménech
- Eugenio Coseriu
- Diego Espín Cánovas
- Fernando González Ollé
- Manuel Jiménez de Parga Cabrera
- Bernard Pottier
- Antonio Quilis Morales
- Mercedes Salisachs Roviralta
- Gregorio Salvador Caja
- José Ángel Sánchez Asiaín
- Manuel Seco Reymundo
- María Soriano Llorente (a título póstumo).
- Philippe Schoutheete de Tervarent
- Alonso Zamora Vicente
- Juan Miguel Lope Blanch
- Miguel León-Portilla
- José Moreno de Alba
- Luis González González
- Harriet Godfrey Peters
- Esteban Vicente Pérez

=== 2000 ===
- Andrés Ollero Tassara
- Rafael Arias-Salgado Montalvo
- Raúl Vázquez Gómez
- Claudio Bravo Camus
- Manuel Marín González
- Marcelino Oreja Aguirre
- José Antonio Fernández Ordóñez

=== 2001 ===
- Cayetana Fitz-James Stuart
- José Ignacio González-Aller Hierro
- Fernando Chueca Goitia
- Luis García-San Miguel Rodríguez-Arango
- Antonio Millán Puelles
- José Bello Lasierra
- Ignasi de Solà-Morales i Rubió

=== 2002 ===
- Enrique Krauze
- Josefina Attard y Tello
- José Jiménez Blanco
- Manuel Agud Querol
- Gregorio Marañón y Bertrán de Lis
- Salustiano del Campo Urbano
- Emilio Fernández-Galiano Fernández
- Josefina Gómez Mendoza
- Carlos Seco Serrano
- Íñigo de Oriol e Ybarra

=== 2003 ===
- Margarita Salas Falgueras
- Diego del Alcázar Silvela
- Miguel Beltrán Villalva
- Joaquín Bosque Maurel
- Manuel Escudero Fernández
- José Manuel González Páramo
- Juan Jiménez Collado
- Rodolfo Núñez de las Cuevas
- Vicente Ortega Castro
- Christine Ruiz-Picasso
- Bernard Ruiz-Picasso
- Joaquín Coello Brufau
- Jesús Hortal Sánchez
- Manuel Jesús Lagares Calvo
- Manuel Ramírez Jiménez
- Kurt Reichenberger
- Roswitha Schagen
- Margarita de Borbón y Borbón-Dos Sicilias, Infanta de España
- Carlos Zurita
- Claudio Boada Villalonga
- Ramón Boixados Male
- José María Macarulla Greoles
- Esteban Santiago Calvo
- José María Gironella Pous

=== 2005 ===
- Antón García Abril
- Josefa Rodríguez Álvarez
- Francisco José Vázquez Vázquez
- Rosa Aguilar Rivero
- Enrique Bustamante Ramírez
- Victoria Camps Cervera
- Fernando Fernández Savater
- Fernando González Urbaneja
- Fernando Buesa Blanco (a título póstumo).
- María Cascales Angosto
- José Ramón Recalde Díez

=== 2006 ===
- María Dolores Gómez de Ávila
- Francisco José Piñón
- Elvira Ontañón Sánchez-Arbós
- Graciela Palau de Nemes
- José Rosón Trespalacios

=== 2007 ===
- Fernando Fernán Gómez
- María Dolors Abelló Planas
- Juan José Badiola Díez
- Josefina Castellví Piulachs
- María Rosa de la Cierva y de Hoces
- Antonio Embid Irujo
- Alfredo Fierro Bardají
- Luis López Guerra
- Francisco Michavila Pitarch
- Juan Rojo Alaminos
- José Segovia Pérez
- Fernando Tejerina García
- Virgilio Zapatero Gómez

=== 2008 ===
- Enrique Guerrero Salom
- Fernando Gurrea Casamayor
- Francisco José Marcellán Español
- Miguel Ángel Quintanilla Fisac
- Alejandro Tiana Ferrer
- Manuel Alexandre Abarca
- Jesús Usón Gargallo

=== 2010 ===
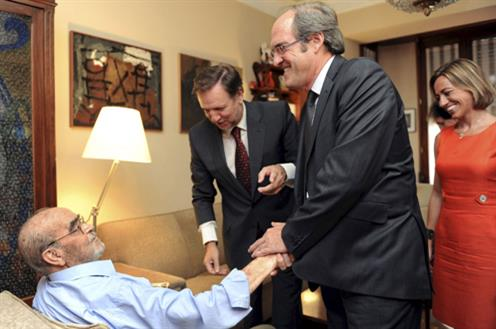
José Antonio Labordeta receiving the Civil Order of Alfonso X, the Wise by Ángel Gabilondo.

- José Antonio Labordeta Subías

=== 2011 ===
- María Jesús San Segundo Gómez de Cadiñanos
- Enrique Franco Manera
- Mercedes Cabrera Calvo-Sotelo
- Ismael Fernández de la Cuesta y González de Prado
- Manuel Carra Fernández
- Alicia Gómez-Navarro Navarrete
- José García-Velasco García
- José Antonio García Caridad
- Eva Almunia Badía
- Amparo Valcarce García
- Marina Grigorievna Polisar
- Eusebio Leal Spengler

=== 2012 ===
- Plácido Arango Arias
- Miguel Ángel Bezos Pérez
- Gonzalo Díaz Díaz
- Ricardo Fernández Gracia
- Alejandro Font de Mora Turón
- Carmen Maestro Martín
- Eugenio Nasarre Goicoechea
- César Nombela Cano
- Francisco Sánchez Martínez
- Juan Velarde Fuertes

=== 2013 ===
- Manuel Díaz-Rubio García
- Manuel González Jiménez
- José Antonio Ibáñez-Martín
- Patricia Phelps de Cisneros
- Teresa Berganza

=== 2014 ===
- Esperanza Aguirre
- Pilar del Castillo
- Juan Díez Nicolás
- María Cándida Fernández Baños
- Ángel Gabilondo
- Francesc Granell
- Julio Iglesias de Ussel
- Esther Koplowitz
- Luis Moisset de Espanés
- Rafael Puyol Antolín
- Hugh Thomas

=== 2015 ===
- Lina Morgan (a título póstumo).

=== 2016 ===
- Gonzalo Suárez.
- Felipe Segovia Olmo (a título póstumo).
- Peridis.
- Luis del Olmo Marote.
- Sofia Corradi.
- Jean Canavaggio.
- Miguel de la Quadra-Salcedo (a título póstumo).
- Mohamed Ibn Azzuz Hakim (a título póstumo).
- Carmen Balcells (a título póstumo).
- Ana Diosdado (a título póstumo).
- Jesús Hermida (a título póstumo).
- José Lladó Fernández-Urrutia.
- Faustino Menéndez Pidal.
- Androulla Vassilliou.
- Rafael Anson Oliart.
- Carmen Maura.
- Cristóbal Halffter.
- Ruggero Raimondi.
- Henry Kamen.
- José Manuel Blecua.
- Mechthild Strausfeld.
- Luis Díez-Picazo y Ponce de León (a título póstumo).
- Dario Franceschini.
- Concha Velasco.
- María Dolores Pradera.
- Julia Gutiérrez Caba.
- Amelia Valcárcel.
- Felipe Fernández-Armesto.
- José Antonio Escudero.
- Jorge Edwards.
- Plácido Domingo.
- Liz Mohn.
- Francisco Luzón.
- Joaquim Molins.

=== 2017 ===
- José Joaquín de Ysasi-Ysasmendi Adaro
- Gustavo Torner de la Fuente
- Marianne Thyssen
- Gil Carlos Rodríguez Iglesias
- Renzo Piano
- Hermann Parzinger
- Soledad Lorenzo García
- Carmen Laffón de la Escosura
- Alicia Koplowitz Romero de Juseu
- Rebeca Grynspan Mayufis
- Valentín Fuster Carulla
- Irina Bokova
- Víctor García de la Concha
- Guillermo de la Dehesa Romero
- Miguel Zugaza Miranda
- Carlos Solchaga Catalán
- Gil Parrondo (a título póstumo).

=== 2019 ===
- Fernando Arrabal
- Francisco Calvo Serraller (a título póstumo).

== Plate holders ==
=== 1933 ===
- María Tereza Montoya

=== 1951 ===
- José María de la Vega

=== 1963 ===
- Benigno Janín Campo
- Buenaventura Bassegada Muste
- Fernando Martín Panizo

=== 1967 ===
- Rafael Manzano Martos

=== 1970 ===
- José Manuel Paredes Grosso

=== 1973 ===
- Florencio del Pozo Frutos

=== 1975 ===
- Fidel Mato Vázquez

=== 1978 ===
- Ramón Agenjo Cecilia

=== 1980 ===
- Jorge España-Heredia Briales

=== 1991 ===
- Daniel Céspedes Navas

=== 1995 ===
- Helena Elsa Reyna Pastor Baños

=== 1996 ===
- Francisco Javier Carrillo Montesinos

=== 2000 ===
- Antonio Delgado Porras

=== 2004 ===
- Birgit Grodal
- Jean Jacques Laffont

=== 2010 ===
- Manuel de Castro Barco

=== 2016 ===
- Ana María Muñoz Merino.
- Emmanuela Gambini Chiappeta.
- Fidel López Álvarez.
- Dídac Ramírez i Sarrió
- José Antonio Lasheras Corruchaga (a título póstumo).
- José Ignacio Sánchez Pérez.
- Juan Antonio Montesinos García (a título póstumo).
- Lucero Tena.
- Magí Castelltort Claramunt.
- María Teresa Lizaranzu Perinat.
- Paolo Pinamonti.
- Pau Roca Blasco.
- Santiago Iñiguez de Onzoño.
- Ymelda Moreno y de Arteaga Marquesa de Poza.

=== 2017 ===
- Mariano Bellver Utrera.
- Lorena González Olivares.
- Miguel Ángel Recio Crespo.
- José Pascual Marco Martínez.
- Segundo Píriz Durán.
- Daniel Hernández Ruipérez.
- José Luis Blanco López.
- Pedro de Borbón-Dos Sicilias y Orleans.

=== 2025 ===
- Javier Santaolalla

== Members ==
=== 1947 ===
- Juan Cabré Aguiló
- Francisco Pérez-Pons Jover

=== 1959 ===
- Aurelio Cazenave Ferrer

=== 1964 ===
- Luis Seco de Lucena Paredes

=== 1965 ===
- Juan Portús Serrano

=== 1966 ===
- Andrés Seoane
- Nicolás González Bellido

=== 1967 ===
- Francisco Olid Maysounave
- Luis Izquierdo
- Lucio Lascaray Ondarra

=== 1978 ===
- Enrique Barajas Vallejo
- Anselmo Pardo Alcaide

=== 2010 ===
- Milagros Blanco Pardo
- Juan Iglesias Marcelo
- Antonio Lara Ramos
- Konrado Mugertza Urkidi
- Pedro Orteha Marhuenda
- Orlando Suárez Curbelo

=== 2011 ===
- María Luisa Martín Martín
- José Antonio Martínez Sánchez
- José Manuel Martínez Vega
- José Mario Rodríguez Alvariño
- Augusto Serrano Olmedo

=== 2012 ===
- Francisco López Rupérez

=== 2016 ===
- Marino Andrés García
- Francisco Baila Herrera
- Raúl Fernández Ortega
- Gabriel Fernández Rojas
- Pedro José Gonzalez Felipe
- Juan Carlos González Méndez
- José Miguel Jiménez
- Jordi Labres Palmer
- Luis Navarro Candel
- Rosa María Rodríguez Grande

=== 2017 ===
- Carmen Alarcón Rosell
- María Asunción Milá Sagnier
- Cristina del Río Navarro

== Cross ==
=== 1941 ===
- Carlos Benítez Dalfó

=== 1957 ===
- José Lloret Talens
- Jesús Llorca Radal
- Luis López Prieto

=== 1960 ===
- José María Portugués Hernando

=== 1965 ===
- Julian Varela Lorbes

=== 1970 ===
- Juan Ramírez González
- Ramón Serrano Salom

=== 1972 ===
- Gonzalo Miguel Pascual

=== 1975 ===
- Andrés Jaque Amador

=== 1976 ===
- Esteban Leonardo García Cela

=== 1981 ===
- Antonio Olmedo Esteve

=== 1983 ===
- Nicolás Borja Pérez

=== 1991 ===
- Lorenzo Vidal Vidal

=== 1996 ===
- Angel Luis Abós Santabarba
- Ramón Acín Fanlo
- José Luis Alcalá Vargas
- Hilario Alvarez Fernández
- Inocencia Arbelo Alayón
- Ramón Arozamena Sanzberro
- María Luisa Bailo Aznar
- Javier Blasco Zumeta
- Mariano Blázquez Fabián
- Evelio Carbonero Arroyo
- Andréu Crespí Plaza
- Trinidad Crespo Alvarez
- Eusebio Cueto Pradas
- Marciano Cuesta Polo
- Carmen Culla Cortés
- Jacob Chocrón Murciano
- Santiago Debón Tortosa
- José Luis Espinosa Iborra
- María Victoria Gallardo Núñez
- María del Carmen García Arribas
- Juan Gómez Castillo
- José Gómez Gijón
- José Gómez Gil
- Pablo González Pérez
- José Luis González Uriol
- María Paz Gracia Gabarre
- María de los Angeles de las Heras y Núñez
- Primitiva Herrero Rosales
- Antonia Jiménez Robles
- Pilar de Larios Vega
- Juan Latorre Durán
- Jesús Lérida Domínguez
- Rodrigo López Lafuente
- Angel Llorente Morales (a título póstumo).
- Josefa Marcos Martín
- María del Pilar Martín Arribas
- Adelaida Martín Sánchez
- Pilar Matilla Gómez
- Santos Mazagatos García
- Asunción Merino García
- Javier Monente Zardoya
- Sebastián Monzón Suárez
- María del Carmen Moreno Gorrón
- José Muñoz Bueno
- Pablo Eugenio Muro Sivert
- Florencio Navarrete Romero
- María Noriega Alvarez
- Carlos Orden Gonzalo
- Carlos Salvador Pérez Bustos
- Herminio Ramos Pérez
- Georgina Rodríguez Díaz
- Eladio Rodríguez Ferrón
- Vicenta Rodríguez Rodríguez
- Jesús José Rodríguez Rodríguez de Lama
- Salustiano Rodríguez Vera
- Vicente Ruiz Gañán
- José Evaristo Sánchez Hernández
- Salvador Sandoval López
- José Sanz Barrio
- Adolfo Senosiain Murugarren
- Francisco José Serrano Gil
- Jesús Angel Terán Fernández
- Isidoro Torres Cardona
- Álvaro del Valle García
- Modesto Vega Alonso
- Antonio Velasco López de Ocariz
- Juan Antonio Vicente Pérez
- María Luz Vidal Sanjuán
- Juana María del Carmen Villavieja Vega (a título póstumo).

=== 1997 ===
- Ramón Calsapeu i Cantó

=== 2006 ===
- Jordi Bonet i Armengol
- Mario Díaz Martínez
- Enrique López Viguria
- Agustín Matía Amor
- Aintzane Monteverde Asua
- Antonieta Montserrat i Robert
- José Antonio Warletta García
- Antonio Alaminos López
- Sara Alba Corral
- Julián Aso Ezquerra
- Rafael Bailo Pola
- Gonzalo Bercero Ingelmo
- Miguel del Cerro Calvo
- María del Carmen Cuadrado Solano
- José Fernández Vivero
- Francisco Gallego Monserrate
- Jesús Ángel González Isla
- José Antonio Lázaro Velamazán
- José María López Lacárcel
- Antonio Llorente Simón
- Santiago Matas Utrilla
- José Manuel Prieto González
- Antonio Serrano Vinué
- José Manuel Sixto Nogueira
- Julio del Valle de Iscar

=== 2007 ===
- Juan Antonio Gómez Trinidad
- Dionisio Cueva González

=== 2009 ===
- Pedro López Cuevas

=== 2011 ===
- Adolfo Héctor Alonso Abella
- Santiago Arellano Hernández
- José Luis Balibrea Cantero
- Enrique Ballester Sarrias
- Juan Rafael Cabrera Afonso
- Rafael Caro Ruiz
- Juan Chamorro González
- José António Falcão
- Luis Miguel Falcón García
- Román Felones Morrás
- Paciano Fermoso Estébanez
- Juan González Ruiz
- Carlos Antonio de las Heras Pedrosa
- Guillermo Herrero Maté
- José Antonio Ibáñez-Martín y Mellado
- Luis Eladio Jorcano Íñiguez
- Soledad Lera Miguel (Sor Teresa).
- Pedro Lorenzo Fernández
- Daniel Lucendo Serrano
- José Luis Magro Esteban
- Miguel Ángel Mansilla y Rodríguez
- José Manuel Martín Cisneros
- José Antonio Martínez Álvarez
- Juan Francisco Martínez Tirado
- Carlos Jesús Medina Ávila
- Emilio Reina González
- Luis Pablo Rodríguez Rodríguez
- Pedro Felipe Sánchez Granados
- José Villasante Colina
- Yosuke Yamashita

== Tie ==
=== 1988 ===
- Capilla del Misterio de Elche

=== 1995 ===
- Orquesta Sinfónica de Radio Televisión Española

=== 1998 ===
- Institución Fernando el Católico
- Real Instituto Jovellanos

=== 2000 ===
- Guardia Civil
- Cuerpo Nacional de Policía

=== 2003 ===
- Banda Municipal de Valencia

=== 2005 ===
- Colegio de Infantes de Nuestra Señora del Pilar
- Escolanía de Montserrat

=== 2006 ===
- Federación Española de Religiosos de la Enseñanza
- Federación de Escultismo en España (FEE).

=== 2007 ===
- Colegio San Patricio
- Colegio Nuestra Señora del Pilar
- Federación de Trabajadores de la Enseñanza de la Unión General de Trabajadores (FETE-UGT).
- Orden de las Escuelas Pías

=== 2011 ===
- Fundación Tomillo
- Fundación de Ayuda contra la Drogradicción
- Asociación de Institutos Históricos de España

=== 2014 ===
- Academia General Militar de Zaragoza

== Plate of honor ==
=== 1998 ===
- Tabularium Artis Asturiensis, archivo de arte asturiano

=== 2009 ===
- Colegio de Educación Infantil y Primaria Ramiro Solans de Zaragoza.

=== 2010 ===
- Colegio de Educación Infantil y Primaria León Solá (Melilla).
- Instituto de Educación Secundaria Mateo Alemán de Alcalá de Henares (Madrid).

=== 2016 ===
- Instituto de Educación Secundaria Alfonso X el Sabio (Murcia).

=== 2017 ===
- Agrupación Musical de Guardo (AMGu) de Guardo (Palencia).
