= List of recipients of the Grand Cross of the Order of Public Instruction =

The Order of Public Instruction is a Portuguese order of civil merit. Established in 1927, it is conferred upon deserving individuals for "high services rendered to education and teaching."

The following is a list of recipients of the order's highest grade, Grand Cross.

Source for the list: "Entidades Nacionais Agraciadas com Ordens Portuguesas", Ordens Honoríficas Portuguesas (Office of the President of Portugal). Retrieved 19 February 2019.

== Portuguese recipients ==
| Name | Date | Academic rank or profession |
|---|---|---|
| Dr Pedro José da Cunha | 24 May 1927 | |
| José Caeiro da Mata | 13 January 1930 | Professor Doutor |
| Alexandre Alberto de Sousa Pinto | 21 March 1930 | Architect |
| Guilhermina Bataglia Ramos | 10 April 1930 | |
| Dr Domingos Fezas Vital | 22 September 1930 | |
| José Leite de Vasconcelos Pereira de Melo | 22 October 1930 | |
| Gustavo Cordeiro Ramos | 31 December 1930 | Professor Doutor |
| Aquiles Alfredo da Silveira Machado | 20 March 1931 | Professor |
| Colégio Militar | 26 August 1931 | |
| Count José Capelo Franco Frazão | 5 October 1931 | |
| António Faria Carneiro Pacheco | 5 October 1933 | Professor |
| Dr João Duarte de Oliveira | 1 August 1934 | |
| Abel Pereira de Andrade | 20 June 1936 | Professor |
| Major Victor Hugo Duarte de Lemos | 11 February 1937 | |
| José Pereira Salgado | 28 May 1937 | |
| Luis Wittnich Carrisso | 3 September 1937 | Professor |
| Dr Angelo Rodrigues da Fonseca | 2 June 1938 | |
| João Alberto Pereira de Azevedo Neves | 2 June 1938 | Senator |
| Francisco José Nobre Guedes | 18 July 1938 | Engineer |
| Agostinho Celso de Azevedo Campos | 14 February 1940 | Professor |
| Bishop José Alves Matoso | 25 May 1940 | |
| António Luis de Morais Sarmento | 21 August 1940 | Senator |
| António Augusto Esteves Mendes Correia | 26 July 1941 | Professor |
| Marcelo José das Neves Alves Caetano | 31 October 1944 | Professor Doutor |
| José Gabriel Pinto Coelho | 3 March 1945 | |
| General José Justino Teixeira Botelho | 10 May 1945 | |
| Moisés Bensabat Amzalak Amzalak | 15 May 1945 | Professor Doutor |
| Liceu Literário Português do Rio de Janeiro | 25 September 1945 | |
| Dr Amândio Joaquim Tavares | 10 March 1947 | |
| Mário de Figueiredo | 22 March 1948 | Professor Doutor |
| Sociedade de Geografia de Libboa | 24 November 1950 | |
| Luiz da Câmara Pinto Coelho | 24 January 1952 | Ambassador |
| Elisa Batista de Sousa Pedroso | 16 November 1954 | |
| Fernando Duarte Silva de Almeida Ribeiro | 4 January 1955 | Professor |
| António Augusto Gonçalves Rodrigues | 23 May 1957 | |
| Maximino José de Morais Correia | 26 August 1957 | |
| Francisco de Paula Leite Pinto | 5 July 1960 | Professor Engenheiro |
| Maria Batista dos Santos Guardiola | 2 January 1967 | |
| Inocêncio Galvão Teles | 8 February 1967 | Professor Doutor |
| José Hermano Saraiva | 14 February 1970 | Professor Doutor |
| João de Castro Mendes | 4 May 1983 | Professor Doutor |
| Jacinto Almeida do Prado Coelho | 3 August 1983 | Professor Universitário |
| Fernando José Maria de Melo Manuel da Câmara de Moser | 29 August 1984 | Professor Doutor |
| Carlos Alberto da Mota Pinto | 24 August 1985 | Professor Doutor |
| Dr António Augusto Ferreira de Macedo | 16 May 1986 | |
| António Simões Lopes | 13 November 1987 | Professor Doutor |
| Luis António de Oliveira Ramos | 25 January 1988 | Professor Doutor |
| Adérito de Oliveira Sedas Nunes | 6 April 1988 | Professor Doutor |
| José Sebastião da Silva Dias | 28 June 1988 | Professor Doutor |
| Luis Filipe Lindley Cintra | 28 June 1988 | Professor Doutor |
| António Manuel Pinto Barbosa | 4 February 1989 | Professor Doutor |
| Óscar Luso de Freitas Lopes | 12 April 1989 | Professor Doutor |
| Carlos Manuel Leitão Baeta Neves | 13 July 1990 | Professor Doutor |
| António Arruda Ferrer Correia | 30 August 1990 | Professor Doutor |
| José Veiga Simão | 26 March 1991 | Professor Doutor |
| Abílio Dias Fernandes | 10 June 1992 | Professor Doutor |
| José Augusto Rodrigues França | 10 November 1992 | Professor Doutor |
| Fernando Nunes Ferreira Real | 19 May 1994 | Professor Doutor |
| Manuel Bernardo Barbosa Soeiro | 9 June 1995 | Professor Doutor |
| Fernando Vieira Gonçalves da Silva | 9 June 1995 | Professor Doutor |
| Sérgio Machado dos Santos | 9 June 1995 | Professor Doutor |
| Manuel Jacinto Nunes | 23 January 1996 | Professor Doutor |
| João Evangelista Loureiro | 8 June 1996 | Professor Doutor |
| Joaquim José Barbosa Romero | 22 December 1997 | Professor Doutor |
| Carlos Alberto Lloyd Braga | 29 October 1998 | Professor Doutor |
| Manuel Gomes Guerreiro | 28 March 2000 | Professor Doutor |
| Dr Arquimedes da Silva Santos | 1 October 2001 | |
| António Manuel Sampaio de Araújo Teixeira | 19 October 2001 | Professor Doutor |
| Virgílio Alberto Meira Soares | 28 May 2002 | Professor Doutor |
| Joaquim Cerqueira Gonçalves | 9 June 2002 | Professor Doutor |
| Rogério António Fernandes | 9 June 2002 | Professor Doutor |
| Dr António Carvalho de Almeida Coimbra | 2 October 2002 | |
| Maria Beatriz Pinto de Sousa Amorim Rocha Trindade | 8 March 2003 | Professora Doutora |
| Alberto José Nunes Correia Ralha | 27 August 2003 | Professor Doutor |
| João Manuel Cotelo Neiva | 17 October 2003 | Professor Doutor |
| Fernando Roldão Dias Agudo | 1 March 2004 | Professor Doutor |
| Aloísio Coelho | 5 April 2004 | Professor Doutor |
| Joaquim Augusto Ribeiro Sarmento | 31 May 2004 | Professor Doutor |
| Eduardo da Cruz Gomes Cardoso | 9 June 2004 | Professor Doutor |
| Francisco Xavier Miranda de Avillez | 9 June 2004 | Professor Doutor |
| Vitor Manuel de Aguiar e Silva | 4 October 2004 | Professor Doutor |
| Manuel Rodrigues Gomes | 9 March 2005 | Professor Doutor |
| Stephen Ronald Stoer | 4 October 2005 | Professor Doutor |
| António Manuel Seixas Sampaio da Nóvoa | 4 October 2005 | Professor Doutor |
| António Francisco de Carvalho Quintela | 17 January 2006 | Professor Engenheiro |
| José Henrique da Costa Ferreira Marques | 17 January 2006 | Professor Doutor |
| Manuel Leal da Costa Lobo | 17 January 2006 | Professor Doutor |
| Júlio Domingos Pedrosa da Luz Jesus | 8 June 2009 | Professor Doutor |
| Major-General Cândido Manuel Passos Morgado | 6 February 2010 | |
| Fernando Manuel Ramôa Ribeiro | 10 June 2011 | Professor Doutor |
| Fernando Seabra Santos | 10 June 2011 | Professor Doutor |
| Manuel José dos Santos Silva | 10 June 2011 | Professor Doutor |
| Avelino de Freitas de Meneses | 10 June 2011 | Professor Doutor |
| António Manuel da Cruz Serra | 7 June 2013 | Professor Doutor |
| Joaquim Pedro Pereira Amaro | 7 June 2013 | Professor Doutor |
| Luís Francisco Valente de Oliveira | 28 June 2013 | Professor Doutor |
| Jorge Quina Ribeiro de Araújo | 9 June 2014 | Professor Doutor |
| José Carlos Diogo Marques dos Santos | 20 June 2014 | Professor Doutor |
| Maria Helena Vaz de Carvalho Nazaré | 14 April 2015 | Professora Doutora |
| Maria da Glória Ferreira Pinto Dias Garcia | 14 October 2016 | Professora Doutora |
| Daniel José Branco Sampaio | 26 October 2016 | Professor Doutor |
| Álvaro Joaquim de Melo Siza Vieira | 6 April 2017 | Architect |
| José António Rebocho Esperança Pina | 19 April 2017 | Professor Catedrático |
| Jorge Manuel Moura Loureiro de Miranda | 20 April 2017 | Professor Doutor |
| Roberto Artur da Luz Carneiro | 10 May 2017 | Professor Doutor |
| António Manuel Bensabat Rendas | 21 November 2017 | Professor Doutor |
| Maria Odette Santos Ferreira | 21 December 2017 | Professora Doutora |
| Nuno Tornelli Cordeiro Ferreira | 15 January 2018 | Professor Doutor |
| José Manuel Sérvulo Correia | 7 February 2018 | Professor Doutor |
| Rómulo Vasco da Gama de Carvalho | 26 February 2018 | |
| Manuel de Jesus Antunes | 20 July 2018 | Professor Doutor |
| António Augusto Magalhães Cunha | 30 July 2018 | Professor Doutor |
| Manuel António Cotão de Assunção | 30 July 2018 | Professor Doutor |
| Sabastião José Cabral Feyo de Azevedo | 30 July 2018 | Professor Doutor |
| Walter Friedrich Alfred Osswald | 24 October 2018 | Professor Doutor |
