= Ricardo Díez-Hochleitner =

Ricardo Díez-Hochleitner is the name of:

- Ricardo Díez Hochleitner (professor) (1928–2020), Spanish-born professor, father.
- Ricardo Díez-Hochleitner Rodríguez (ambassador) (born 1953), Spanish diplomat, son.
