= Bartolomé Bennassar =

French historian and writer (1929–2018)

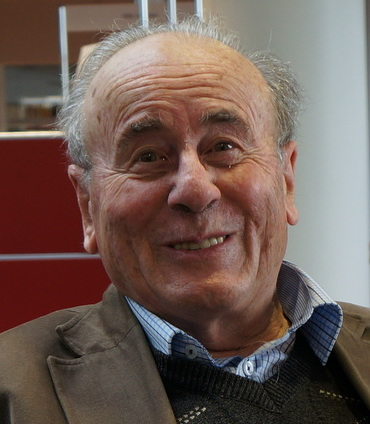
- Bennassar in 2013
- Born: 8 April 1929; Nîmes, France
- Died: 8 November 2018 (aged 89); Toulouse, France
- Education: University of Toulouse-Jean Jaurès; Paris-Sorbonne University; University of Montpellier
- Occupations: Historian; Writer; Professor
- Spouse: Lucile Bennassar (deceased)
- Children: Jean Bennassar (deceased)

Bartolomé Bennassar (8 April 1929 – 8 November 2018) was a French historian and writer. He specialized in Spanish and Latin American history.

== Career ==
Bennassar began as a history professor in 1952, and defended his thesis in 1957.

He was a Professor Emeritus at the University of Toulouse-Jean Jaurès, specializing in contemporary history of Spain and Latin America, as well as the 16th and 17th centuries. He was also a renowned critic of bullfighting.

=== Contributions to modern Spanish history ===
Bennassar wrote books titled Le Voyage en Espagne (The Spanish Inquisition), L'Histoire des Espagnols (The History of the Spanish), and La Guerre d'Espagne et ses lendemains (The Spanish Civil War and its Aftermath). He also wrote a very important biography on Francisco Franco. His most famous book, Last Leap, was developed into a film in 1970.

== Personal life ==
His wife, Lucile, signed copies of Les Chrétiens d'Allah and Le Voyage en Espagne with him.

His son, Jean, committed suicide in 1979 at the age of 22.

== Awards ==
Bennassar was awarded the Grand Cross of the Civil Order of Alfonso X, the Wise in 1987. He won the Prix-Eugène Colas in 1990. In 1991, he won Prix xviie siècle for Les Christians d'Allah. Bennassar received the Grand prix Gobert in 2005. He also won an Honorary Degree from the University of Valladolid.
