= Román Felones =

Spanish politician, historian, and professor

Román Felones Morrás (born 4 February 1951 in Los Arcos) is a Spanish politician, historian, and professor. He has been the president of the Socialist Party of Navarre (PSOE) since 2004. He has been a member of the board of the Association of Friends of the Camino de Santiago in Estella since January 2021.

== Biography ==
After graduating in History from the University of Zaragoza, where José María Lacarra was his professor, he completed his doctorate in Education Sciences at the National University of Distance Education with a thesis entitled: "The Public University of Navarra: Genesis and Impact of a Project."

In 1987, he began his teaching career as an associate professor of Geography and History at the Estella Institute. He subsequently worked as a professor and lecturer in secondary education at various educational centers in Navarra, as well as a collaborating professor on various projects of the Public University of Navarra, such as the Aula de la Experiencia (Classroom of Experience), where he was appointed President of the Social Council in 2013.

== Political career ==
He joined the Socialist Party of Navarre in 1987, although he had previously served as Provincial Director of Education and Minister of Education, Culture, and Sports for the Government of Navarre (1984-1987), a position he held until 1991. During this period, on the recommendation of the Navarre Council of Culture, the Príncipe de Viana Culture Awards were created.

He has served as a member of the Parliament of Navarre.

== Professional career ==
As a researcher, he is the author of various works on the history, art, and geography of Navarre, as well as educational materials for secondary education. He also covers specific topics related to the Camino de Santiago, his hometown of Los Arcos, and his current residence, Oteiza de la Solana.

He is a regular contributor to the Diario de Navarra newspaper. He received the "Parlamento de Navarra" Research Award in 1998.

== Awards and tributes ==
- 1998: "Parlamento de Navarra" Research Award for his work "Corps of Navarra and University: Structure of a Project"
- 2010: Cross of Alfonso X the Wise
