= Wenceslao Benitez Inglott =

Spanish admiral

The Most Excellent Wenceslao Benítez Inglott OAX
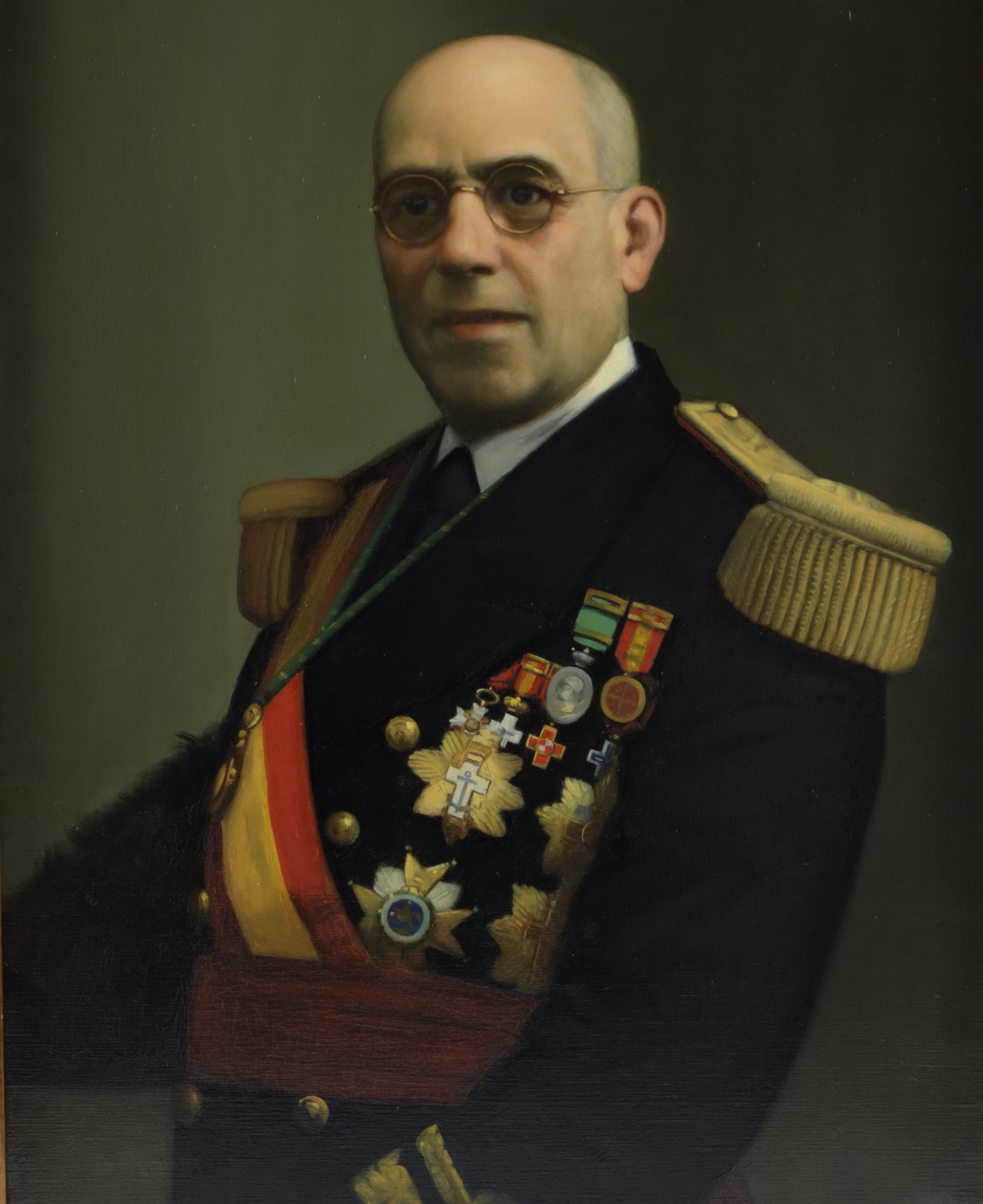

Personal details
- Born: 30 April 1879 Las Palmas de Gran Canaria, Spain
- Died: 22 December 1954 (aged 75) San Fernando, Spain
- Spouse: Maria Luisa de Mesa y Ruiz-Mateos
- Education: Colegio de San Agustín Escuela Naval Militar

Military service
- Allegiance: Spain
- Branch/service: Spanish Navy
- Years of service: 1893-1940
- Rank: Counter Admiral

Wenceslao Benitez Inglott OAX (30 April 1879 – 22 December 1954) was a distinguished Spanish navy officer, scientist, and engineer.

== Biography ==
He was born in Las Palmas de Gran Canaria on 30 April 1879, son of the lawyer Eduardo Benítez González and of Maria del Pino Inglott Navarro.

Benitez Inglott's early years were spent in the prestigious Colegio de San Agustín in Las Palmas, where he demonstrated an early interest in mathematics and astrophysics. When he was fourteen years of age he passed the entrance exams to enrol in the Spanish Navy with the highest marks.

He was commissioned into several navy ships after training. Between 1922-1925 Benitez Inglott commanded Dédalo, the first Spanish seaplane carrier, in the context of the Rif War. The ship sailed in 1924 towards Southampton to collect twelve Supermarine Sea Eagles flying boats purchased by the Spanish Navy to provide air support to the hard-pressed Spanish forces on the ground. Dédalo was to play a fundamental role in supporting the Alhucemas landing in September 1925; the first time in history that an amphibious landing was assisted by naval aviation.

On 19 October 1929 a Royal Order appointed Benítez Inglott director of the Spanish Naval Military Academy, position he would retain until immediately after the proclamation of the Second Spanish Republic in 1931. As the Academy's director Benítez Inglott was also appointed private tutor to the Infante Juan of Spain, son and later heir to King Alfonso XIII of Spain, who was training there. On 14 April, following the Republic's proclamation, Benítez Inglott personally ensured that Infante Juan safely joined the rest of his family in exile.

In 1940, upon Benítez Inglott's retirement, the Minister of the Navy recommended him to become honorary Counter Admiral of the Spanish Navy for his scientific and military achievements. He was also director (1940–1954) of the Real Instituto y Observatorio de la Armada, in San Fernando, where he had previously been deputy director. He taught in the Escuela de Guardias Marinas, de la Aplicación and of the Hydrographic Engineers. In April 1942 he was elected member of the Spanish Royal Academy of Sciences with medal number 5. His opening speech is entitled El Universo Sideral.

Benítez Inglott died on 22 December 1955, age 75, in San Fernando (Cádiz).

== Awards and honours ==
Cross (White Decoration, 1st class) of Naval Merit (1911)

Cross (Red Decoration, 1st class) of Military Merit (1912)

Cross (Red Decoration, 1st class) of Naval Merit (1913)

Cross (White Decoration, 1st class) of Naval Merit (1919)

Cross (White Decoration, 2nd class) of Naval Merit (1926)

Grand Cross (White Decoration) of Naval Merit (1934)

Grand Cross of the Royal and Military Order of Saint Hermenegild (1943)

Grand Cross of the Civil Order of Alfonso X, the Wise (1955, posthumously)

As a token of royal appreciation on 23 January 1931 King Alfonso XIII appointed Benítez Inglott a Gentilhombre de Cámara con Ejercicio (Gentleman of the Bedchamber), taking oath of loyalty to the King at the Royal Palace of Madrid on 9 April 1931. It has been argued he was the last Gentilhombre of the Spanish Monarchy since this palatial honorary class was suppressed after the Second Spanish Republic was declared, being never re-created following the Restoration of the Spanish Monarchy in 1975.

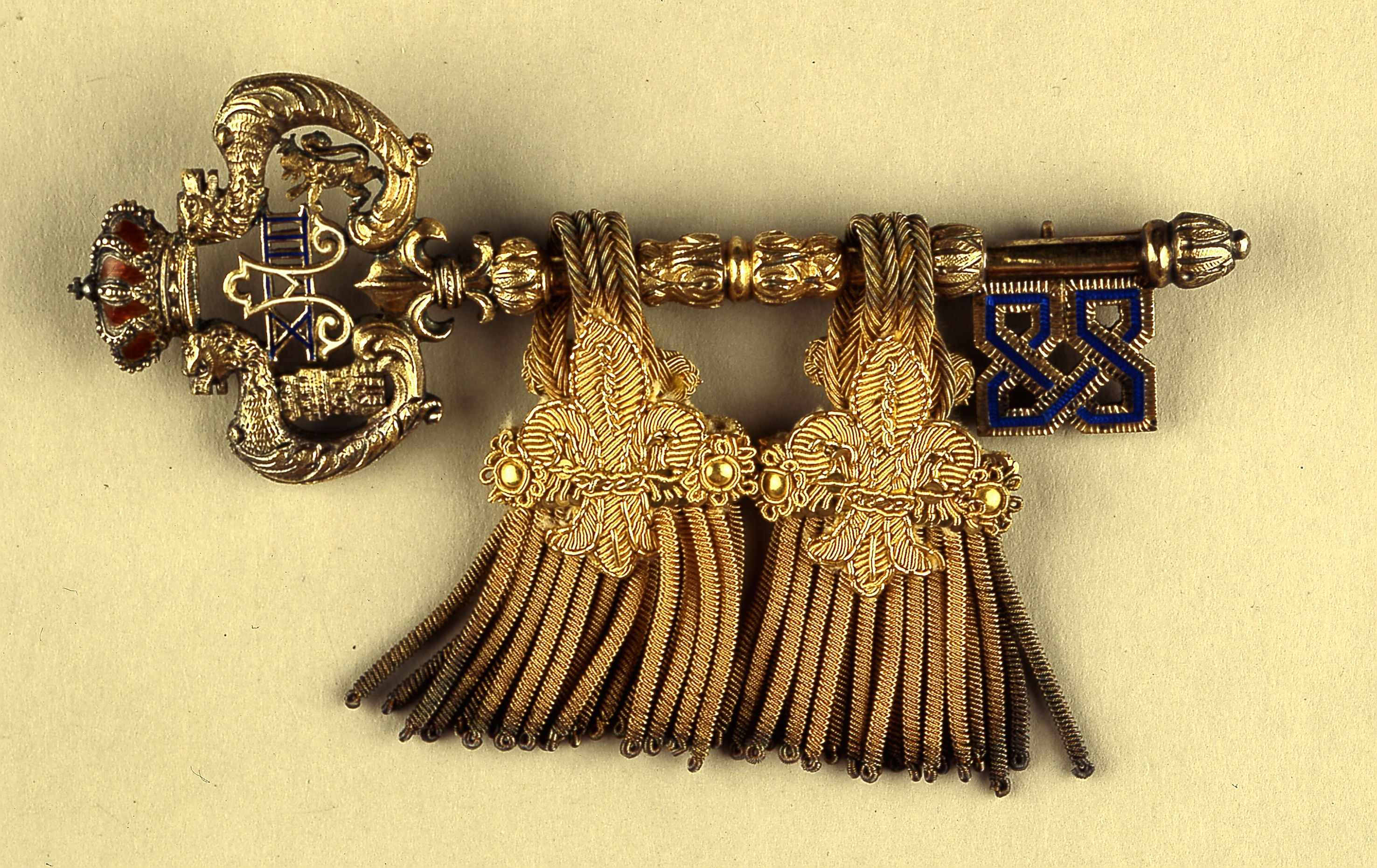
Benítez-Inglott's badge as a Gentleman of the Royal Bedchamber (1931).

An institute of secondary education in San Fernando is named after him and so are three streets: in his hometown, in San Fernando, and in Arinaga (Gran Canaria).

Preceded by Honorato Castro y Bonel	Spanish Royal Academy of Sciences; Medal 5; 1943-1954	Succeeded by Manuel Velasco de Pando
