= Francesc Granell =

Spanish economist and academic (1944–2022)

Francesc Granell i Trias
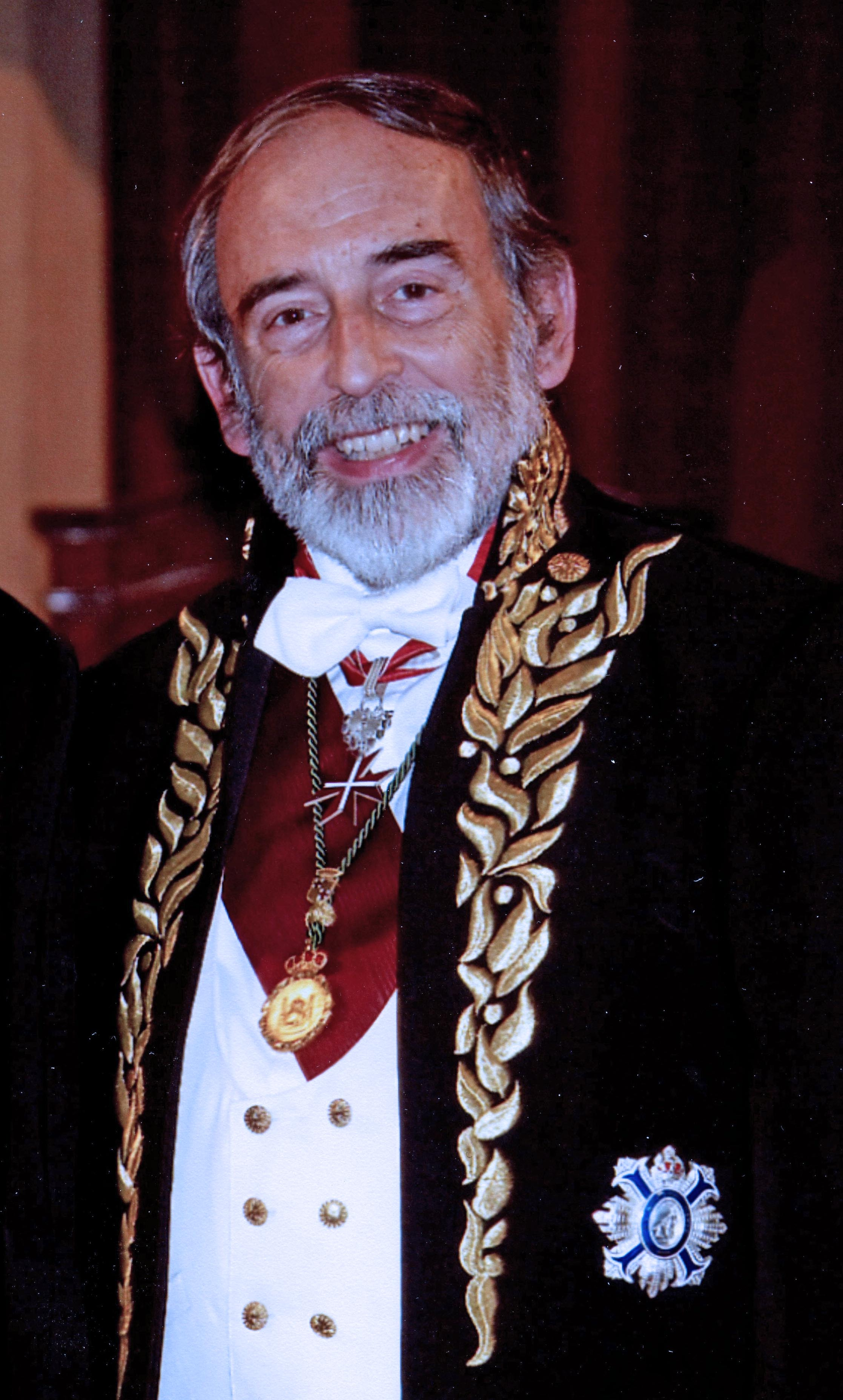
- Granell in 2009
- Born: 7 May 1944; Barcelona, Catalonia, Spain
- Died: 30 August 2022 (aged 78); Girona, Catalonia, Spain
- Spouse: Ernestina Rodríguez de Castro (m. 1969; died 2021)
- Children: 3
- Awards: Grand Cross of the Civil Order of Alfonso X, the Wise (2014); Creu de Sant Jordi (2012); Order of Civil Merit (2007)

Academic background
- Education: University of Barcelona

Academic work
- Discipline: Economics
- Institutions: University of Barcelona; Autonomous University of Barcelona; University of Seville; Universitat d'Andorra

Francesc Granell i Trías (7 May 1944 – 30 August 2022) was a Spanish economist and academic. He was a professor of Applied Economics at the University of Barcelona. As a public servant, Granell held governmental positions in Catalonia, Spain, and the European Community.

== Books ==
- El Mercado de Sudáfrica (Barcelona, Cámara de Industria, 1967)
- Espanya i el Mercat Comú: Aventatges i inconvenients (Gerona, Cámara de Comercio, 1970)
- Export Promotion by Private Sector Organizations (Geneva, International Trade Centre UNCTAD/GATT, 1971)
- La Exportación y los Mercados Internacionales (Barcelona, Editorial Hispano-Europea, 6th ed., 1971)
- Las empresas multinacionales y el desarrollo (Barcelona, Ed. Ariel, 1974)
- Las inversiones españolas en el exterior (Barcelona, Cámara de Comercio, 1974)
- La opción europea para la Economía española (with Profs. Muns and Ortega, Madrid, Guadiana, 1974)
- Guía Práctica de Mercados Exteriores (Barcelona, Cámara Oficial de Comercio, Industria y Navegación, 1977)
- Brasil y la cooperación económica latinoamericana (Barcelona, Instituto de Economía Americana, 1979)
- La opción CEE para la economía de Canarias (Las Palmas, Cámara de Comercio de las Palmas, 1979)
- La Ayuda española a los países en desarrollo (Universidad de Barcelona, 1980)
- Las Comunidades autónomas frente a su Comercio Exterior y a la integración en las Comunidades Europeas (editor, Universidad de Sevilla, 1981)
- Política Comercial y Comercio Exterior de España (Barcelona, Orbis, 1986)
- Cataluña, sus relaciones económicas transnacionales y la CEE (Barcelona, Vicens Vives, 1986)
- España y las Organizaciones Económicas Internacionales (Enciclopedia de la Economía Española y CEE, Ed. Orbis)
- La Catalogne (Paris, Presses Universitaires de France, 1988)
- Guía Comunidad Europea (Barcelona, TISA, 1989)
- El Debate Librecambio-Protección a finales del siglo XX, (Barcelona, Real Academia de Ciencias Económicas y Financieras, 1995)
- Catalunya dins la Unió Europea (with V. Pou and M.A. Sánchez, editors, Barcelona, Edicions 62, 2002)
- La Coopération au développement de la Communauté Européenne, Bruxelles, Université Libre, Collection Le Droit de la CE et de l'Union Européenne, 2nd ed., 2005)
