= Antonio Valero Vicente =

Spanish industrial engineer and professor (1925–2001)

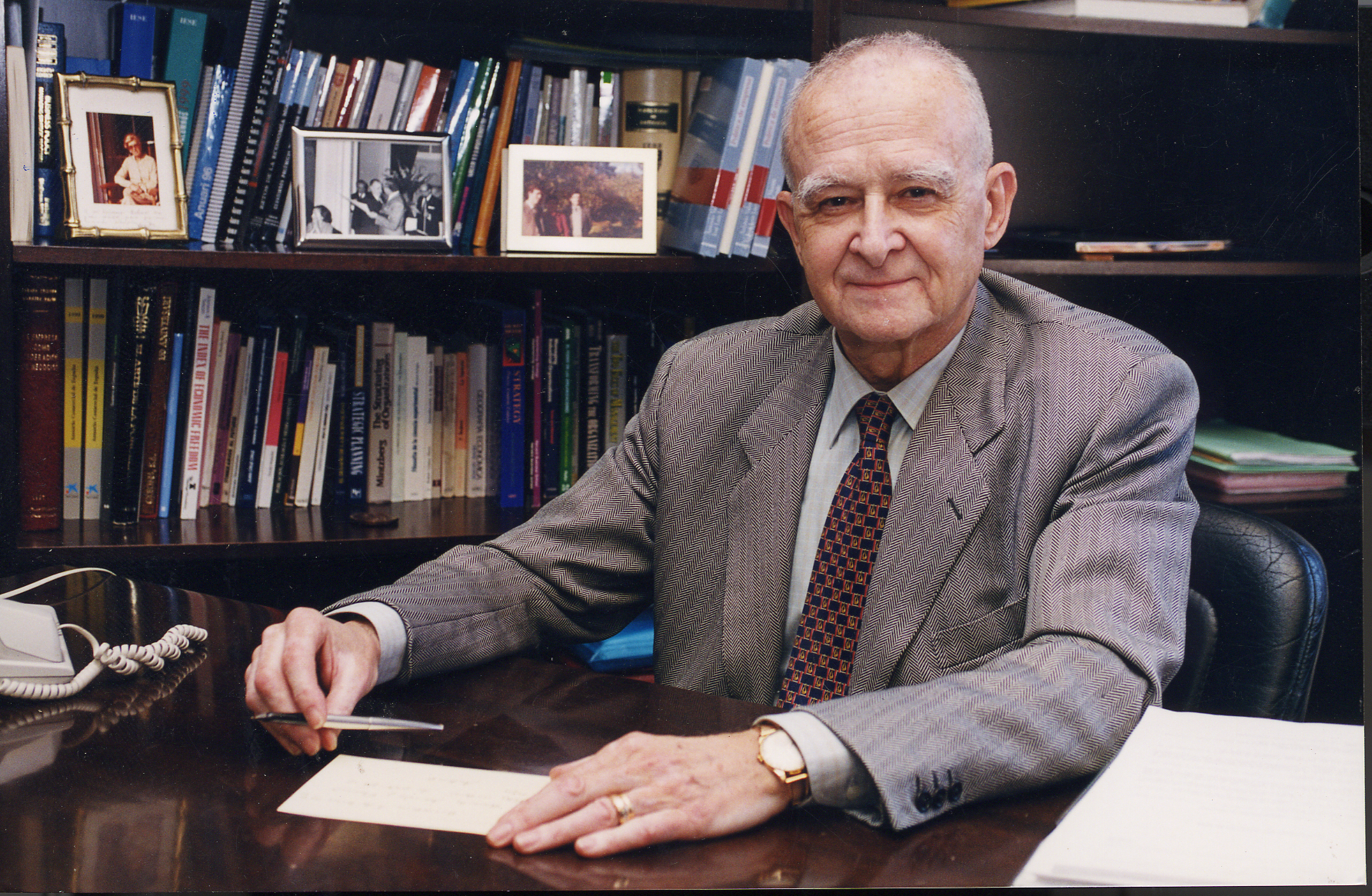
- Valero in 1999
- Born: March 1, 1925; Zaragoza, Spain
- Died: August 8, 2001 (aged 76); Zaragoza, Spain
- Education: School of Engineering of Terrassa
- Occupations: Industrial engineer, professor, dean
- Honors: Grand Cross of the Civil Order of Alfonso X, the Wise.

Antonio Valero Vicente (March 1, 1925 – August 8, 2001) was a Spanish industrial engineer, professor and the first dean of IESE Business School, part of the University of Navarra. A pioneer in executive education and in using the case method to teach management in Spain, he was committed to the world of business. Valero served as a board member and advisor in public and private sector companies, and was an advisor to various government ministries. He helped found the first centrist political parties in Catalonia. In 1968, he was awarded the Grand Cross of the Civil Order of Alfonso X, the Wise.

== Education ==
The son of Gabriel Valero and Dolores Vicente, he grew up in Zaragoza, where he began his higher education at the Escuela Profesional de Comercio (1943), before moving on to Industrial Engineering in Terrassa, where he finished top of his class (1949) and graduated with honors, earning the Premio Extraordinario de Fin de Carrera. In 1960, he completed his Ph.D. in Textile Engineering from the Terrassa School of Engineering, where he would also earn an engineering doctorate in Textile Industries

== Academic Activity ==
Antonio Valero served as professor of the Chemistry of Dyes and Artificial Fibers, and of Prints and Textile Preparation (1954–1960), and later as professor of Industrial Organization and Business Administration (1962–1963) and of Theory, Structure and Economic Institutions, and Business Administration and Production Management (1963–1972) at the Escuela Técnica Superior de Terrassa. He was a professor of economics at the Escuela Técnica Superior de Ingenieros Industriales de Bilbao (1977–1990).

Valero joined the University of Navarra's IESE Business School as dean and professor (1958-1994) the year of its founding. He taught Business Policy, later renamed General Management, in various executive education programs, always instilling a sense of what a company committed to society and based on the ethical principles of Christianity is

Antonio Valero was also a visiting professor at the following academic institutions: Institut Européen d'Administration des Affaires (INSEAD), Fontainebleau, France (1963); Instituto Panamericano de Alta Dirección de Empresa (IPADE), Mexico (1967–1968); Istituto Superiore per Imprenditori e Dirigenti di Azienda (ISIDA), Palermo, Italy (1970); Tel Aviv University, Israel (1971–1972); Austral University Business School (IAE), Argentina (1978); Universidad Simón Bolívar de Caracas (1979), Venezuela; Associaçao de Estudos Superiores de Empresa (AESE), Lisbon, Portugal (1980); School of Management and Business at Universidad de La Sabana (INALDE), Colombia (1986–1987); School of management at the University of Piura (PAD), Peru; and Instituto de Desarrollo Empresarial (IDE), Guayaquil, Ecuador (1998).

His role as a professor was complemented by his responsibilities in the management and guidance of educational organizations: He was a member of the Governing Board (1958–1967) and the Board of Trustees (1967–1974) of the University of Navarra and vice president (1964–1966), then president (1966–1968) of the European Association of Management Training Centers (EAMTC), based in Brussels.

== Founding of IESE ==
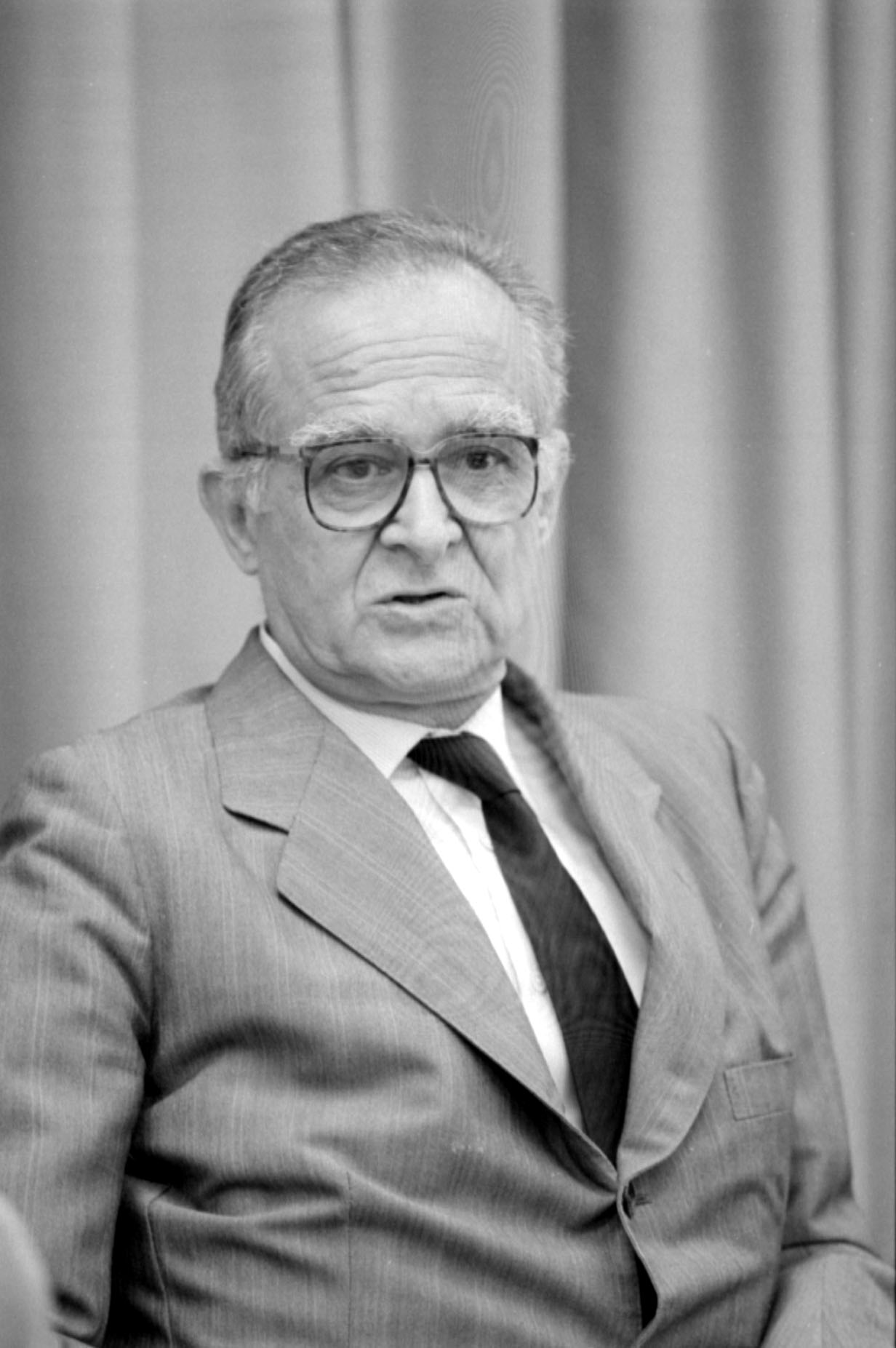
Antonio Valero, 1988

In the summer of 1957, José Javier López Jacoiste, an envoy of Josemaría Escrivá, met with Valero and conveyed the Opus Dei founder's desire to take measures to help business leaders manage their companies from a Christian perspective. Thus, Antonio Valero began the process commissioned by Escrivá to create a school that would train business leaders and executives.

Valero gathered information from several colleagues and friends about what was happening outside of Spain in the field of executive education. In the spring of 1958, he traveled to Lille (France), whose École des Administrations des Affaires—directed by an MBA graduate from Harvard Business School (HBS)—had introduced the case method of teaching, a novelty in Europe. In May, Valero presented a proposal to Escrivá, who gave his approval and set the 1958–1959 academic year as its launch date.

In the first action plan for IESE, Valero outlined the initial phase of the project, the professors who could take part in it and the name of the future educational institute, which was, after some discussion, was called the Escuela de Directores del Instituto de Estudios Superiores de la Empresa (IESE).

With Valero as dean, the next steps were to select the faculty and develop the curriculum for the first program, called the Programa de Alta Dirección de Empresas (PADE), which was aimed at business leaders with at least a decade of experience in senior management. On November 25–26, 1958, the first classes were held at the Hotel del Parque in Sant Andreu de Llavaneres. The Programa de Dirección de Empresas (PDE) followed in the 1959–1960 academic year, and the Programa de Desarrollo para Alta Dirección de Empresas (PDADE, now known as PDG) in 1961. In 1964, with the help of Harvard Business School (HBS), IESE launched the Master in Business Administration and Economics (MED). It was the first time the term "master's" was used in Europe; it later took on the standardized name of MBA.

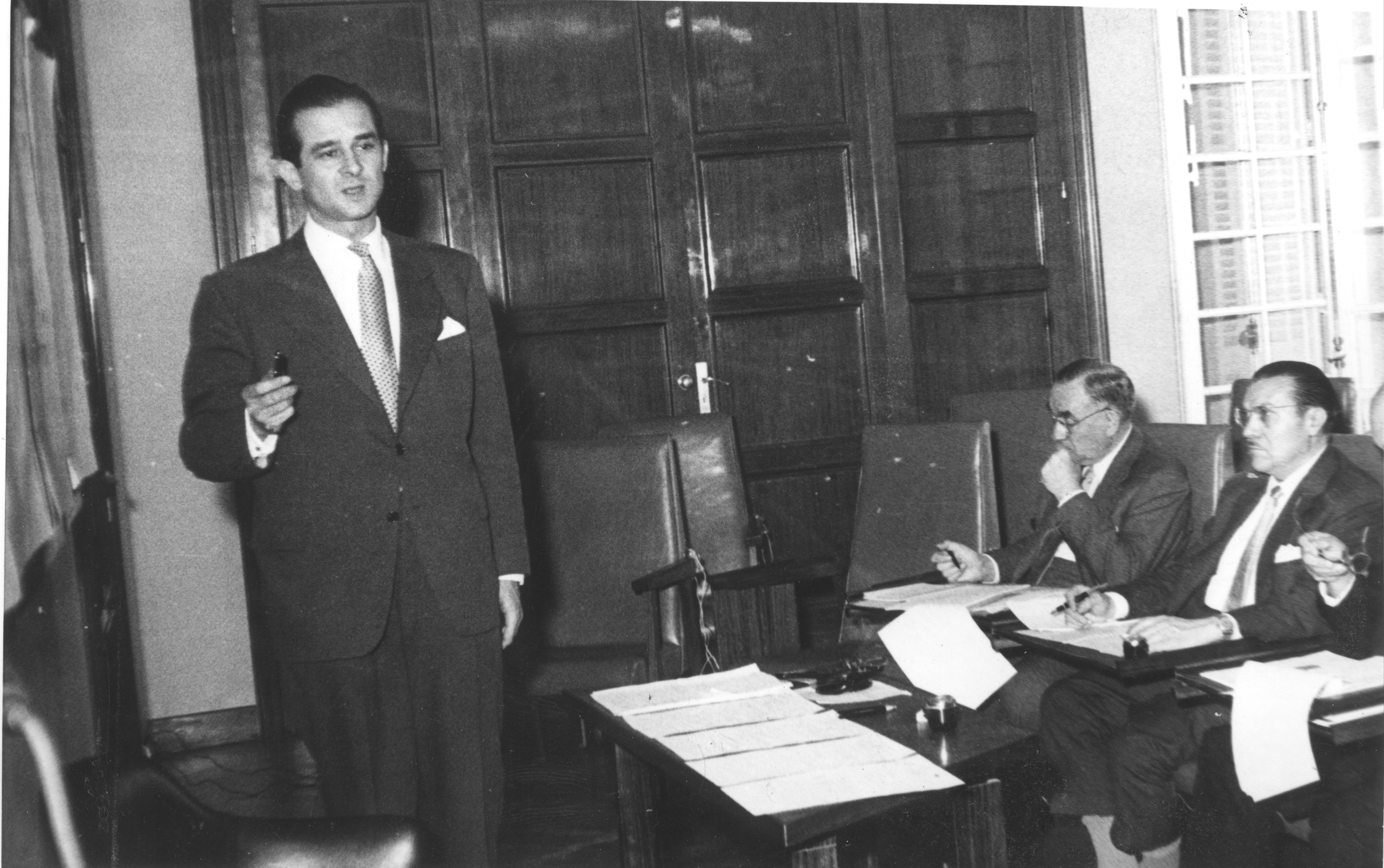
Antonio Valero during the Senior Business Management Program (PADE, 1959)

The impetus for launching the master's program came from Escrivá, who believed IESE should train not only business leaders and executives, but also young people. In February 1963, on a trip to Rome by professors Carlos Cavallé, Félix Huerta and Antonio Valero, they confirmed the idea that had been developing for months. Participation by professors Cavallé, Huerta, Juan Farrán and Esteban Masifern in the International Teachers' Program at Harvard allowed the IESE professors to get to know the school's master's program and some of its faculty members. In March 1963, Harvard professor Franklin E. Folts spent a month at IESE teaching classes and helping to develop the plan for creating the master's degree. In October of that same year, the Harvard-IESE Committee met for the first time, in Boston, with the Spanish business school seeking advice from the American institution on both academic and practical matters.

For Professor Josep Faus, five strategic decisions by Valero shaped the philosophy and identity of IESE:

- Start from the top. The first courses were created for executives who had at least 10 years of experience in senior management.
- Professor training. Organization and financing of the most advanced specialization with doctorates abroad for IESE professors.
- Internationalization. This was achieved through participation in supranational organizations and through doctorates in business administration.
- Research beyond the creation of pedagogical materials and case studies.
- Allocation of professors’ time:
  - 25%: academic activity
  - 25%: research
  - 25%: internal tasks at IESE
  - 25%: external consulting

Valero was the dean of IESE from its founding in 1958 until 1967, when he was succeeded by Professor Juan Ginebra.

== Thinking: Business Policy ==
Business policy, an area of general management that Valero taught, is a humanist approach to management and corporate governance, with implications for business education. In that respect, Valero outlined the four fundamental points of general management and the firm:

- Community of people.
- Intermediate social institution that serves the common good of society.
- The nature of the company is different from political and technical practices, which leads upper management to employ practical reason and, at the same time, political skills and knowledge.
- Role and responsibility of business leaders and senior management.

He felt it was necessary to reach top business leaders and senior executives (who he regarded as "leaders at the peak") with a Christian and humanist message, distinguishing the benefit derived from innovative creativity and work versus that obtained from speculation His expression and objectives were clear: let other people continue giving handouts; he was there to help business leaders and senior executives with ethical and transparent management. One constant in his personality was the search for perfection in work, the result of him belonging to Opus Dei: according to his students, friends and colleagues, he was very demanding of himself and others, and, at the same time, affectionate and approachable.

The philosopher Salvador Pániker considered him a fiery presence, due to his passion and enthusiasm for infusing and provoking students in the difficult challenge of bringing out the best in themselves. In an interview with Pániker in the early 1970s, Valero is an active, engaged person who believes that "the businessman is a philosopher in action". He defends economic freedom and the role of private initiative: "An intellectual, university education does not guarantee students will learn how to think. A free social structure forces students to think more than a planned and imposed one".

As a professor and businessman, he captured his thoughts in several books and chapters in major publications, as well as numerous academic articles.

== Presence in the Business World ==
With his extensive knowledge of the ecosystem of companies, Valero was a consultant, adviser, board member and executive, starting in 1950, when as a young engineer he helped to design a manufacturing plant with new technologies. Some of the most notable position he held included:

- Advisor to Sobrinos de C. Valero, S.R.C. (1960–1964)
- Member of the board of directors and of the executive committee, and chairman of the governing board of Editorial Salvat (1962–1988)
- Member of the board of directors of Torras Herrería y Construcciones, S. A. (from 1964)
- Member of the board of directors and of the executive committee of S.A. Echevarría (1964–1975)
- President of the board of directors of Montserrat Hermanos, S.A. (1964–1994)
- Adviser to the president of RENFE (1971–1975)
- Member of the board of directors of Lladró, S.A. (1973–1985)
- Member of the board of directors of MAC, Inc., headquartered in the United States, and president of the MAC Europe Council (1974–1985)
- Advisor to the president of Petróleos de Venezuela (1978)
- Adviser to the president of Coca-Cola Argentina (1979)
- Founder and first chairman of Merchbanc, S.A. (1981–1988)
- Adviser to the president of Compañía Telefónica Nacional de España, S.A. (1982).
- Vice President of Nerva-Nerpel (1987–1989)
- Member of the board of directors of Ediciones Internacionales Universitarias, S.A. (EIUN-SA) and Ediciones Universidad de Navarra, S.A. (EUNSA) (from 1988), which he presided over until 1995
- Member of the board of Cementos Molins, S.A. (from 1988)

== Public Responsibilities ==
Valero's involvement and deep knowledge of the business world and production led him to hold positions of responsibility in government institutions and in national and multilateral organizations. He was a consultant to the OECD (1957–1962), advisor to the Spanish ministries of Labor, Justice and Public Works (1964–1965), minister of National Economy (1977–1980), adviser to the Spanish minister of Transport and Communications (1978–1980) and the Argentine minister of Finance (1978–1981); and from December 1975 to May 1977, he was the Technical Secretary-General of the Spanish Ministry of Finance. Housing, Architecture, Urban and Spatial Planning.

== Honors and recognitions ==
- Grand Cross of Merit of Alfonso X, the Wise (1968)
- Business Professor of the Year from Gabinete Anaya de Estudios Empresariales (1973)
- Honorary doctorate from Panamerican University of Mexico (1986)
- Honorary member of the Association of Friends and Alumni of the School of Engineers of Terrassa (1996)

== Publications ==
=== Books ===
- Valero, A., and J.L. Lucas (1991), Política de Empresa. El gobierno de la empresa de negocios, EUNSA, Pamplona.
- Valero, A., and E. Taracena (2000), La empresa de negocios y la alta dirección. Procedimientos políticos de gobierno, EUNSA, Pamplona.
- Valero, A.; J.L. Lucas, and A. García de Castro (2000), Una escuela de pensamiento político para la alta dirección, EUNSA, Pamplona.

=== Articles ===
- (1962) "Estructura de la empresa," Nuestro Tiempo, vol. 93, March 1962.
- (1970) "Orientaciones para la reforma de la empresa," Competencia, vol. 84, September 1970.
- (1987) "El hombre en la empresa,” Nuestro Tiempo, vol. 68, no. 394, April 1987.
- (1996) “Iniciativa privada y creación de empresas,” IESE Alumni Magazine, vol. 63, September 1996. Reproduced in Iniciativa emprendedora y empresa familiar, no. 28, May–June 2001.
- (2001) "Los comienzos del IESE: el impulso del beato Josemaría," Anuario de Historia de la Iglesia, vol. 10, no. 5.

== Related Bibliography ==
- Calleja, L.M. (2016), "Antonio Valero o la búsqueda de empresas más justas y eficaces," IESE Insight, no. 29, pp. 72–74. Journal of Management Development, vol. 36, no. 5, pp. 644–659.
- Calleja, R., and D. Melé (2017), "Valero’s 'Enterprise Politics'": A Model of Humanistic Management and Corporate Governance,” Canals, C. (2009), Sabiduría práctica: 50 años del IESE, Planeta, Barcelona.
- Cremers, M. (2017), "What Corporate Governance Can Learn from Catholic Social Teaching,” Journal of Business Ethics, vol. 145, no. 4, pp. 711–724.
- Dionis, L., et al. (2002), In Memoriam: Antonio Valero, pp. 10–12.
- García de Castro, A. (ed.) (2006), El perfeccionamiento de la alta dirección. Homenaje a Antonio Valero, San Telmo Ediciones, Sevilla.
- Gómez Minakata, C. (2010), "Los inicios de business policy y su relación con la política de empresa de Antonio Valero,” XII Encuentro Internacional de Profesores de Política de Empresa y Entorno, Instituto Internacional San Telmo, Sevilla.
- Gómez Minakata, C. (2011), "La Política de Empresa de Antonio Valero: ideas germinales y desarrollos conceptuales de los primeros treinta años de esta escuela," XIII Encuentro Internacional de Profesores de Política de Empresa y Entorno, Instituto Internacional San Telmo, Sevilla.
- Melé, D. (2012), "The Firm as a 'Community of Persons'": A Pillar of Humanistic Business Ethos,” Journal of Business Ethics, vol. 106, no. 1, pp. 89–101.
- Pampliega, J. (2009), Historia del IESE. Primeros pasos y desarrollo inicial: un estudio inédito (1957–1960) (La Historia de una Business School Pionera a través de la Documentación de sus Archivos, vol. 1), Barcelona.
- Torres, B. (2015), Los orígenes del IESE, LID Editorial, Madrid.
- Various authors. (2001), In memoriam de Antonio Valero y Vicente (1925–2001). Con motivo de la entrega de la Medalla de Oro de la Universidad de Navarra a título póstumo, IESE, Barcelona.
