= Anselmo Pardo Alcaide =

Anselmo Pardo
- Born: Anselmo Pardo Alcaide; 18 September 1913; Melilla, Spain
- Died: 20 July 1977 (aged 63); Córdoba, Spain
- Awards: Civil Order of Alfonso X the Wise
- Scientific career
- Fields: Entomology

Anselmo Pardo Alcaide (1913–1977) was a Spanish entomologist.

== Career ==
Throughout his life he combined his work as a teacher with his entomological studies. He published his first scientific paper in 1936, at 23 years of age, in which he described his first species new to science, Aphodius ambrosi (Coleoptera, Scarabaeidae) in northern Morocco. This article was followed by another 79, in which he described another 145 taxa, mostly Pardo Alcaide became a world authority in families and Melyridae Meloidae- Malachiinae.

He made numerous scientific missions where he collected specimens for study that were particularly important in different regions of Morocco.

== Recognition ==
In 1978 he received posthumously the degree of Commander of the Civil Order of Alfonso X the Wise in recognition of his scientific achievements. In 1979 he gave his name to a new school opened in Melilla, the College of Education and Primary Anselmo Pardo.
