= Ángel González Álvarez =

Spanish professor and philosopher

- Born: August 11, 1916; Magaz de Cepeda
- Died: 29 June 1991 (aged 74)
- Occupations: Philosopher, Professor
- Awards: Civil Order of Alfonso X, the Wise

Academic background
- Education: University of Valladolid, Complutense University of Madrid
- Doctoral advisor: Juan Francisco Yela Utrilla

Academic work
- Discipline: Philosophy
- Institutions: Ministry of Education (Spain), University of Murcia, Complutense University of Madrid
- Doctoral students: Javier Muguerza, Jesus Garcia Lopez

Ángel González Álvarez (born August 11, 1916) was a Spanish philosopher and professor of metaphysics who worked in Argentina and Spain. He was the Director General of Secondary Education in Spain from 1962 to 1967.

== Career ==
Álvarez attended secondary school in Ponferrada before obtaining a teaching degree at the León Teacher Training College. He then began studying philosophy at the University of Valladolid until the Spanish Civil War, after which he finished his Doctorate of Philosophy at the University of Madrid in 1946. His thesis was titled "El tema de Dios en la filosofía existencial (The Theme of God in Existential Philosophy)", and was supervised by Juan Francisco Yela Utrilla. Later that year, he began teaching metaphysics at the University of Murcia. In 1944 and 1945 he worked at the University of Madrid as a teaching assistant, and in 1946 he began serving as the Chair of Metaphysics at the University of Murcia. In 1949, he traveled to Argentina to participate in the First National Congress of Philosophy in Mendoza. In 1950, he founded the Cuyo Philosophical Society where he served as president. In 1954, he began working as the chair of metaphysics at the University of Madrid. He also served as the General Director of Secondary Education from 1962 to 1967. He retired in 1985, before dying in Los Berrocales on June 29, 1991.

== Legacy ==
On November 17, 2016, a plaque was constructed at a primary school in Astorga, Spain. It was constructed by Benito Escarpizo as a part of World Philosophy Day. The unveiling ceremony was attended by Álvarez's son Jesús González, as well as the then mayor of Astorga Arsenio García.

== Works ==
Álvarez produced more than 75 different books, some of them being:

- Historia de la filosofía en cuadros esquemáticos [History of philosophy in schematic tables], 1969, OCLC 48575878
- Política educativa y escolaridad obligatoria [Educational policy and compulsory schooling], 1975, ISBN 9788424928315
- Tratado de metafísica ontología [Treatise on metaphysical ontology], 1979, ISBN 9788424920913
- Manual de historia de la filosofía [Philosophy of education], 1969, OCLC 433809346
- Política educativa y escolaridad obligatoria [Educational policy and compulsory schooling], 1975, ISBN 9788424928315
- Hacia una educación integral [Towards a comprehensive education], 1966, OCLC 1132686155
- ¿A o B? Depende : 70 reflexiones para elegir el camino adeacuado [A or B? It depends: 70 thoughts on choosing the right path], 2015, ISBN 9788493960773
- Juan Pablo II y el humanismo cristiano [John Paul II and Christian Humanism], 1982, ISBN 9788473922036
- Valores fundamentales de la educación [Fundamental Values of Education], 1978, OCLC 1123642086
