= José Gálvez Ginachero =

Spanish physician

Servant of God José Gálvez Ginachero
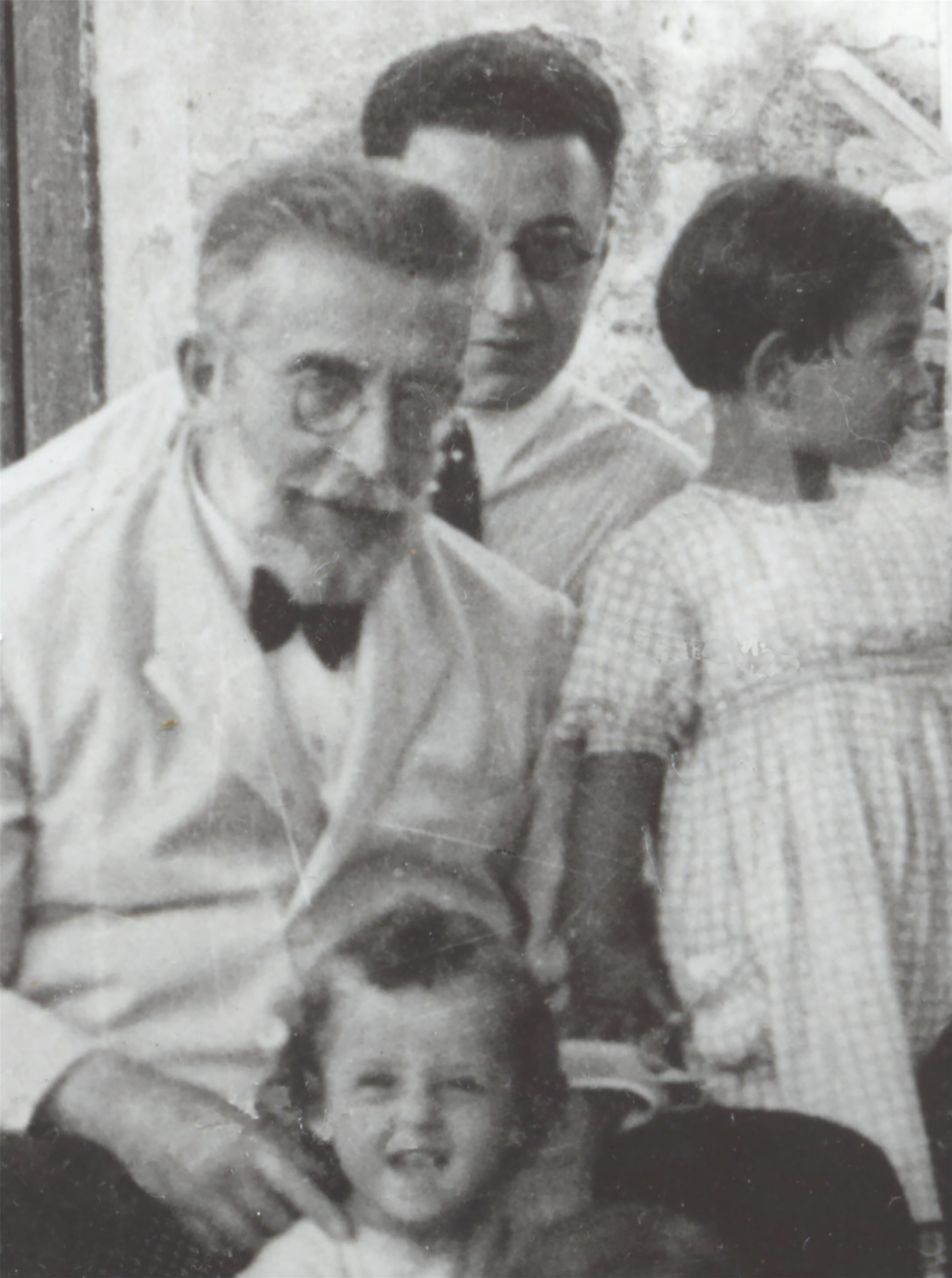
- Gálvez Ginachero (left)
- Born: 29 September 1866; Málaga, Spain
- Died: 29 April 1952 (aged 85); Málaga, Spain

José Gálvez Ginachero (29 September 1866 - 29 April 1952) was a Spanish Roman Catholic doctor. Gálvez Ginachero studied in Granada and Madrid in medicine where he obtained excellent results before doing additional studies in Berlin and Paris. His return to his hometown saw him implement practices he learnt in Europe that not all doctors followed in terms of sanitation in order to reduce patient deaths. He was a distinguished doctor noted for his care for the poor and his meticulous attention to medical practices. This earned him accolades in recognition of his importance to the Málaga social arena and earn him praise from the nation's monarchs.

The beatification process for "San José" - as some people referred to him as in life - opened in the 2000s thus enabling for him to be titled as a Servant of God.

== Life ==
José Gálvez Ginachero was born in Málaga on 29 September 1866 to José de Gálvez Andujar and Carmen Ginachero Vulpius.

Gálvez Ginachero did his initial studies in the Colegio de San Rafael and then attended high school before he graduated after obtaining his diploma in 1882. He then entered into the college in Granada after enrolling in the medical department and graduated there in 1888 before relocating to Madrid to pursue his doctorate at the college there. He obtained his PhD "cum laude" and then from 1890 until 1892 did additional studies in Berlin and Paris in order to broaden his medical expertise and studied under doctors such as Louis Hubert Farabeuf. Ginachero then returned to his native Málaga where he began tending to the poor and to those who were unable to afford proper medical care. In 1893 he joined the Provincial Civil Hospital in Málaga and would remain there until 1951.

In 1904 he married María Moll Sampelayo (d. 1934) and the couple had three children together:

- María del Carmen
- Josefina
- José (who became a doctor)

Gálvez Ginachero was meticulous in his medical duties and was known for having been mild-mannered with a good sense of humor. He awoke at five each morning and then after attending Mass would begin his work. He sometimes slept in the hospital rather than at home in order to tend to those ill people that needed either immediate or constant care. To that end a small room with a small bunk was prepared for him if he needed a place to sleep in. In addition he introduced new techniques in the hospital that he learnt in Europe for better sterilization in order to avoid patient deaths. Before he operated on his patients he would do the sign of the Cross on the area to be operated on as a sign of asking God for His support during the procedure. On 15 June 1923 he was voted as the director for the Provincial Civil Hospital (in recognition of his contributions to the field of medicine) and began making significant improvements in food and the acquisition of medical supplies. His term as the director ended in 1927. In 1924 he co-founded the Santa Cristina Hospital alongside Queen Maria Cristina.

He became one of the first surgeons to deliver an infant after their mother died in an operation he conducted on 17 July 1898; María González Gálvez (1870–1898) was admitted into the hospital but died after she arrived though a C-section allowed for the birth of her daughter who was named María del Carmen Enriquetta. The Bishop of Málaga Juan Muñoz Herrera baptized her with Ginachero acting as her godparent. In 1923 it was proposed that he become the mayor for Málaga and after having had time to consider the offer took the position (succeeding León Donaire) and served in office until he resigned in 1926 to go back to being a doctor (with Enrique Cano Ortega succeeding him). In office he undertook a series of ambitious projects for better sanitation and sought to implement a restoration of the sewer network in order to ensure greater cleanliness.

He was arrested on 10 August 1932 on the suspicion of having been plotting against the government and spent time in jail until 13 August when officials released him. Two lepers secured his release after going to the governor and threatening to have all the town's lepers overrun the streets if he was not released. During the Spanish Civil War he was arrested once again but was released after appearing in court and succeeding in answering their queries. But he was pained when his pregnant daughter Josefina was imprisoned for a brief period. Gálvez Ginachero also helped to organize Catholic Action in Málaga taking inspiration from Pope Pius XI. In 1947 he was awarded with the Great Cross of the Civil Order of Alfonso X and later in life left his widowed sister Carmen his inheritance.

Gálvez Ginachero became ill after contracting cancer; on 29 April 1952 the Bishop of Málaga Ángel Herrera Oria (and future cardinal) came to visit him though Gálvez Ginachero died just after the bishop left. Herrera Oria celebrated his funeral.

== Beatification process ==
The beatification process opened in the Málaga diocese under Bishop Antonio Dorado Soto on 13 July 2006 and was closed just over a decade later under Bishop Jesús Esteban Catalá Ibáñez on 16 June 2017. The formal introduction of the cause came on 19 December 2007 after the Congregation for the Causes of Saints issued the "nihil obstat" (no objections) decree and titled Gálvez Ginachero as a Servant of God.

The current postulator for this cause is Fr. Francisco García Mota.
