= Graciela Palau de Nemes =

Cuban literary critic (1919–2019)

Graciela Palau de Nemes (March 24, 1919 – September 28, 2019) was a Cuban literary critic who specialized in critiquing Spanish and Latin American literature, with a particular focus on the works of poet Juan Ramón Jiménez.

== Education ==
Nemes enrolled at the University of Maryland, College Park, in 1946, where she met Juan Ramón Jiménez. Jiménez served as Nemes' mentor while she pursued her master's and doctoral degrees in addition to teaching language. Nemes completed her master's degree in 1949 and her doctoral degree in 1952.

== Career ==
=== Teaching ===
Graciela Palau de Nemes joined the University of Maryland as a teacher in 1953 and continued her role as an educator until her retirement in 1989 as Professor Emerita in the Foreign Languages Department. Even after retirement, she continued to teach and give lectures at the University of Maryland until 2011.

=== Literary criticism ===
Nemes played a significant role in promoting and critiquing the works of Juan Ramón Jiménez, a Nobel laureate poet. She nominated Jiménez for the Nobel Prize in Literature, which he won in 1956. Her critical analysis of Jiménez's works earned her recognition as a major critic by subsequent generations. Nemes was an honorary member of the Zenobia-Juan Ramón Jiménez Foundation in Spain. On the 50th anniversary of Jimenéz's Nobel Prize, she was invited to speak at eight conferences dedicated to Jiménez and Zenobia Camprubí, delivering opening and closing plenary lectures throughout Spain, including Madrid, Huelva, Seville, and Moguer. Nemes also participated in a seminar at the Residencia de Estudiantes in Madrid and a conference and panel presentation in New York. She attended the closing events of the three-year-long celebrations (2006, 2007, 2008) planned in honor of Jiménez in Madrid and Moguer.

== Accolades ==
A street in Moguer, the birthplace of Juan Ramón Jiménez, was named in honor of Nemes in 2004. In 2006, she received the Great Cross of Alfonso X El Sabio from the Civil Order of Alfonso X, the Wise, and the Medal for Civil Merit from the Spanish government's Order of Civil Merit.

== List of works ==
- Vida y obra de Juan Ramón Jiménez (1957)
- Inicios de Zenobia y Juan Ramón Jiménez en América (1982)
