= José Luis Meilán Gil =

Spanish legal scholar, professor and politician (1933–2018)

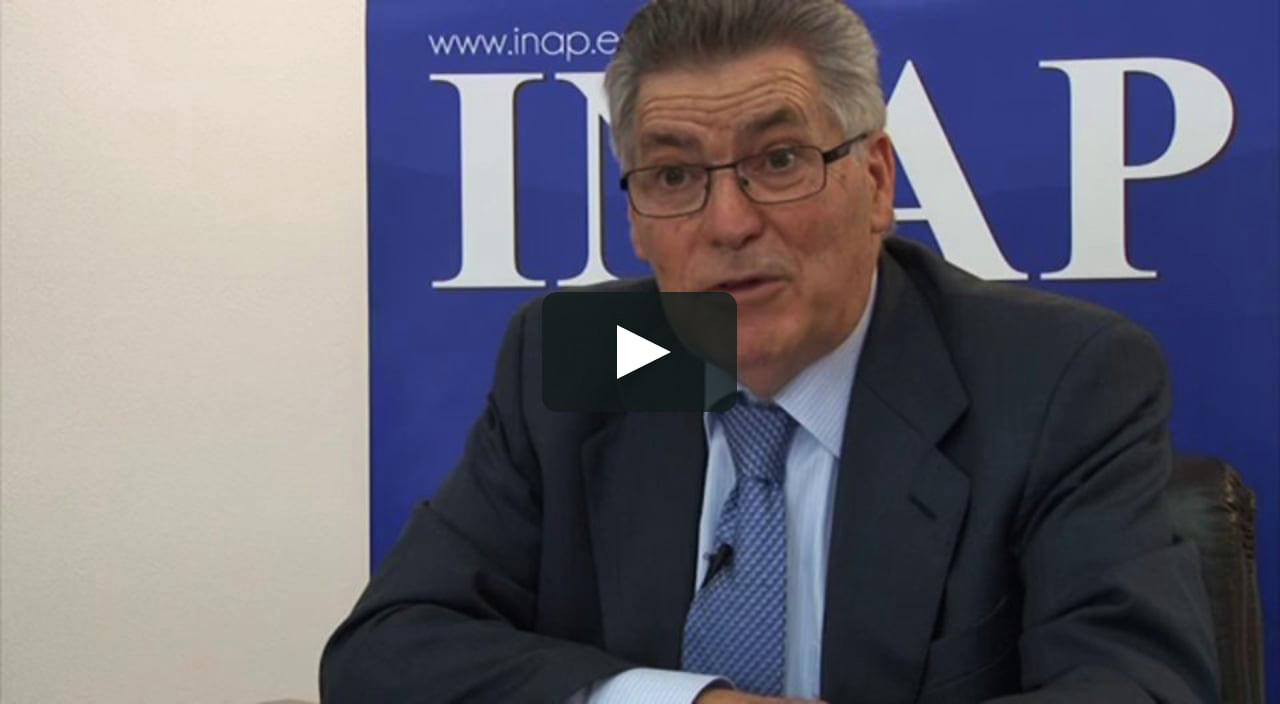
- Meilán at INAP in 2013
- Born: 6 July 1933; A Coruña, Spain
- Died: 26 June 2018 (aged 84)
- Citizenship: Spain
- Occupations: Lawyer, professor and politician

Academic background
- Education: Universidad de Oviedo
- Alma mater: Universidade de Santiago de Compostela

Academic work
- Discipline: Administrative law
- Institutions: Universidad de Madrid; Universidad de Santiago de Compostela; Universidade da Coruña

José Luis Meilán Gil (6 July 1933 – 26 June 2018) was a Spanish lawyer, university professor and politician. He was a member of parliament, participated in the making of the Spanish constitution, and was rector of Universidade da Coruña.

== Early life ==
Born in A Coruña on 6 July 1933, Meilan attended the catholic school run by the Salesians of Don Bosco in his city, from which he graduated in 1951. He then studied law at the universities of Santiago de Compostela, Zaragoza and Oviedo. He started teaching administrative law at Universidad de Madrid and at the school of civil servants at Alcala de Henares (the current INAP), before he earned his chair at Universidade de Santiago de Compostela in 1968.

== Political activity ==
On 16 November 1971 Meilán was elected to the Cortes Españolas, as a representative of the province of A Coruña, remaining in office until 30 June 1977. He founded Partido Gallego Independiente, which joined Unión de Centro Democrático (UCD) for the 1977 Spanish general election, in which he was elected for the Spanish Congress of Deputies. After being re-elected on 1 March 1979, on 26 April he was appointed secretary of state for constitutional development.

== Rector of Universidade da Coruña ==
Meilan promoted the creation of Universidade da Coruña, and was appointed its rector on 1 August 1990. He would then be elected and re-elected several times until he retired undefeated at the mandatory retirement age of 70 in 2003. Meilan is also named among the five "pioneers" that founded the Spanish University Rectors' Conference in 1994, being also the second to head its Spanish University Committee for International Relations.

== Awards and distinctions ==
Meilán has received the Gold Medal of Galicia, the Great Cross of the Order of Civil Merit, the Great Cross of the Civil Order of Alfonso X, the Wise, the Order of Agricultural Merit, and Grand Officer of the Order of Merit of the Italian Republic.
