= IES Alfonso X =

Public high school in Murcia, Spain

Coordinates: 37.9951°N 1.1257°W

Instituto de Educación Secundaria Alfonso X El Sabio (IES Alfonso X) English: Alfonso X Institute of Secondary Education is a public high school in the city of Murcia, Spain. It is named after Alfonso X "the Wise". Established in 1837, the school moved into its current building in the Vista Alegre district in 1966.

Education is from seventh grade (usually age 12), and some classes are taught in French, English or German. IES Alfonso X is well known in Murcia for its Spanish university entrance exam scores ( la selectividad). They are regularly the highest in Murcia and among the top 10 in all of Spain. It is a unique school in that it is the only school that the University of Murcia offers early admission to medical school.
