= Silverio of Saint Teresa =

Spanish Catholic clergy

Silverio de Santa Teresa
- Born: Julián Gómez Fernández; March 8, 1878; Escóbados de Arriba, Burgos, Spain
- Died: March 11, 1954 (aged 76); Mazatlán, Mexico
- Occupation: Historian

Silverio of Saint Teresa (Spanish: Silverio de Santa Teresa) is the religious name of Julián Gómez Fernández, a discalced Carmelite who was born in the Province of Burgos, Spain on 8 March 1878 and died on 11 March 1954 in Mazatlán, Mexico. He was a general historian, editor of the works of the Carmelite saints, and superior general of the order. One of his greatest contributions to Carmelite studies was an annotated edition of the works of Teresa of Ávila and John of the Cross.
