= Pío Zabala y Lera =

Pío Zabala y Lera (Zaragoza, November 19, 1879 – Madrid, 1968) was a Spanish historian and son of Manuel Zabala Urdániz.

He was a deputy in the Spanish Parliament for Cuenca and held various positions in public administration within the Maurista group beginning in 1913. He published numerous historical works from 1906, based directly on archives.

He was rector of the University of Madrid between 1939 and 1952.

He was a member of the Royal Academy of History; a member of the full council of the CSIC; a member of the Raimundo Lulio and Marcelino Menéndez Pelayo boards of trustees; vice-director of the Jerónimo Zurita Institute of History; and director of the journal Hispania from its founding in 1940 until 1958.

== Works ==
- Spain under the Bourbons (Zaragoza, Fernando el Católico Institution, 2009).
