= Ricardo Díez Hochleitner =

Spanish professor and economist (1928–2020)

- Born: 11 August 1928; Bilbao, Spain
- Died: 1 April 2020 (aged 91); Madrid, Spain
- Occupations: Professor; Economist

Ricardo Díez Hochleitner (11 August 1928 – 1 April 2020) was a Spanish professor and economist.

He got a BS degree in chemistry (Universidad de Salamanca, Spain), post-graduate degree in chemical engineering (Technical University of Karlsruhe, Germany) and MBA (Georgetown University, Washington D.C.). He served as the president of the Club of Rome from 1990 until 2000 and as honorary president thereafter.

Díez-Hochleitner was married to Ascensión Rodríguez Martínez and had four sons and three daughters. He was the father of Ricardo Díez-Hochleitner, who has served as Spain's ambassador to Morocco since 2015.

== Biography ==
From 1955 to 1956, Díez-Hochleitner was Under-Secretary of State for Education and Science in Spain. From 1956 to 1957, he was deputy minister of education in Colombia. He also held management positions at the World Bank, UNESCO, and the Organization of American States. He was vice-president of the Club of Rome from 1988 to 1990, and president until 2000.

In 1972, Díez-Hochleitner received the Gold Medal of Merit in the Fine Arts, awarded by the Spanish Ministry of Culture.

From 1993 to 1998, Díez-Hochleitner was member of the advisory board of the Bertelsmann Stiftung, where he pioneered the German-Spanish Forum.

Following 2000, he was honorary president of the Club of Rome and a member of its executive committee. He became adviser for the United Nations to the University for Peace in Costa Rica in 2001.

He was a member of the board of directors of the International Institute for Democracy and Electoral Assistance, a member of the restructuring committee of FRIDE, and a member of the board of directors of the EFE Foundation.

== Awards ==
- Order of Isabella the Catholic
- Civil Order of Alfonso X, the Wise (1969)
- Cross of Merit of the Order of Merit of the Federal Republic of Germany
- Gold Medal of Merit in the Fine Arts (Spain)
