= José António Falcão =

Portuguese art historian (born 1961)

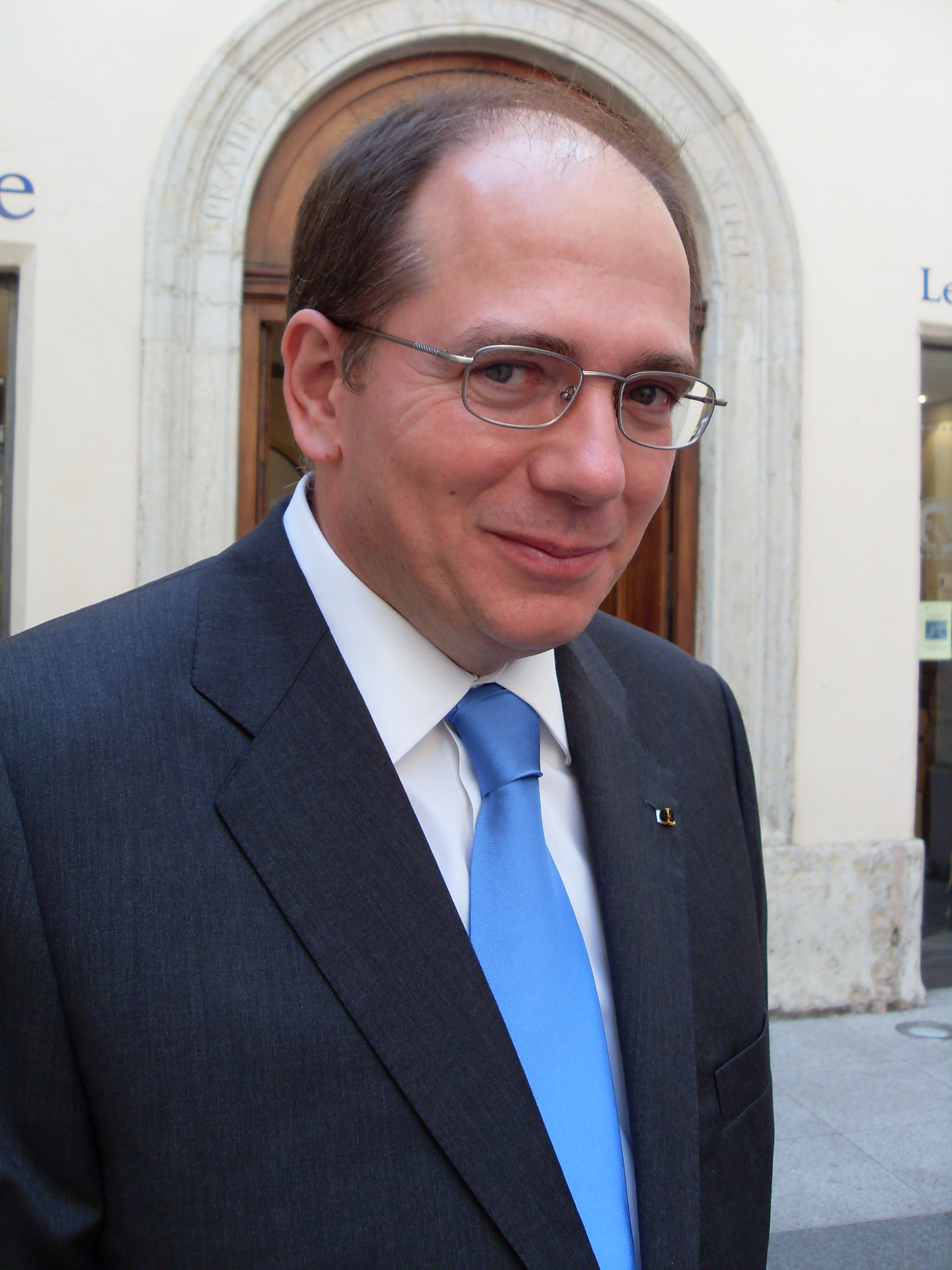
- Born: 1961 (age 64–65); Lisbon

José António Nunes Mexia Beja da Costa Falcão (born 1961) is a Portuguese art historian, museum curator and educator.

== Biography ==
Falcão was the head of the Department of Historical and Artistic Heritage of the Diocese of Beja from 1984 until its extinction in 2017 “Conservador-chefe de museus” (museums chief curator), he was also the organizer of the diocesan museums network of Beja.

He has worked at the Museu de Évora and the Museu Calouste Gulbenkian, and was curator and director of Casa dos Patudos in Alpiarça, the former residence of José Relvas.

One of his particular areas of research has been the churches and treasures of Southern Portugal. He is one of the “modern generation” of Portuguese art historians to study and disseminate research on the art of the Alentejo (the area between the Tagus River and the Algarve). He has published multiple books on this subject: As Vozes do Silêncio (The Voices of Silence) [1997], Entre o Céu e a Terra (Between Earth and Sky) [2000] and As Formas do Espírito (The Shapes of the Spirit) [2004].

Other essays published created bridges between Eastern and Western spiritual traditions and their reflections on aesthetic and artistic creations. His contributions to the scientific study of the artistic civilization of the Southwestern Iberian Peninsula gave evidence for the preservation of monuments and works of art.

José António Falcão is a corresponding member of the Academia Nacional de Belas-Artes (National Fine-Arts Academy) and Academia Portuguesa da História (Portuguese Academy of History). He served as president of the Real Sociedade Arqueológica Lusitana (Royal Lusitanian Archaeological Society). He is now chairman of the Associação Portuguesa de Museus da Igreja Católica (Portuguese Association of Catholic Church Museums) and deputy general secretary of Europae Thesauri.

=== Department of Historical and Artistic Heritage of the Diocese of Beja ===
The Historical and Artistic Heritage Department of the Diocese of Beja, in Portuguese Departamento do Património Histórico e Artístico da Diocese de Beja (DPHA), was a non-profit organization created and directed by Falcão in 1984 with a group of volunteers with differing backgrounds in the cultural heritage sector.

Until its disbandment in 2017, it was responsible for the safeguard and care of the historical churches in Alentejo in Southern Portugal, operating in a 12 300 km² area.

The DPHA launched an inventory of the cultural heritage of this area. It also created a counseling service covering from preventive conservation to technical and law matters, as a support to parishes. Co-operating with local authorities, it provided training courses to priests and volunteers and created protection committees and a network of museums.

== Selected bibliography ==
- As Vozes do Silêncio. Imaginária Barroca da Diocese de Beja, Beja – Lisboa, Departamento do Património Histórico e Artístico – Estar Editora, 1997.
- Rosa Mystica – Mariendarstellungen aus dem Südlichen Portugal, Regensburg, Schnell und Steiner, 1999.
- Entre o Céu e a Terra. Arte Sacra da Diocese de Beja, I-III, Beja, Departamento do Património Histórico e Artístico da Diocese de Beja, 1998.
- O Alto-Relevo de Santiago combatendo os Mouros da Igreja Matriz de Santiago do Cacém, Beja – Santiago do Cacém, Departamento do Património Histórico e Artístico da Diocese de Beja – Câmara Municipal de Santiago do Cacém, 2001 (colab.)
- As Formas do Espírito. Arte Sacra da Diocese de Beja, I-III, Beja, Departamento do Património Histórico e Artístico da Diocese de Beja, 2004.
- Fragmentos de Eternidade. Imagens da Virgem na Arte dos Séculos XVI-XIX, Alpiarça, Casa dos Patudos – Museu de Alpiarça, 2004.
- O Jardim das Hespérides. Pintura Espanhola do Século XIX na Colecção da Casa dos Patudos, Alpiarça, Casa dos Patudos – Museu de Alpiarça, 2005.
- Visões do Invisível – Património Religioso da Margem Esquerda do Guadiana, Beja, Departamento do Património Histórico e Artístico da Diocese de Beja, 2005.
- A a Z – Arte Sacra da Diocese de Beja, Beja, Departamento do Património Histórico e Artístico da Diocese de Beja, 2006.
- Filhos do Sol, Filhos da Lua. Aspectos da Criação de Gado Bovino e da Tauromaquia na Casa dos Patudos, Alpiarça, Casa dos Patudos – Museu de Alpiarça, 2006.
- Os Corpos e as Almas. Obras de José Malhoa na Colecção da Casa dos Patudos, Alpiarça, Casa dos Patudos – Museu de Alpiarça, 2006.
- XIX Século XX. Momentos da Pintura Portuguesa na Casa dos Patudos, Alpiarça, Casa dos Patudos – Museu de Alpiarça, 2007.
- Un Río de Agua Pura. Arte Sacro del Sur de Portugal, Borja – Beja, Centro de Estudios Borjanos, Institución “Fernando El Católico” – Departamento do Património Histórico e Artístico da Diocese de Beja, 2008.
- O Coração da Terra. Aspectos da Ruralidade na Arte Europeia (Séculos XVII-XX), Beja, Departamento do Património Histórico e Artístico da Diocese de Beja, 2008.
- Atmosferas, Pessoas, Narrativas. Um Relance sobre an Arte do Ocidente (Séculos XVII-XX), Beja, Departamento do Património Histórico e Artístico da Diocese de Beja, 2009.
