= Francisco de Paula Leite Pinto =

Minister of National Education
- In office 1955–1961

Personal details
- Born: October 16, 1902 Lisbon, Portugal
- Died: May 29, 2000 (aged 97) Estoril, Portugal
- Occupation: Engineer, professor, politician

Francisco de Paula Leite Pinto (16 October 1902 – 29 May 2000) was a Portuguese mathematician, engineer, educator, and statesman who served as Portugal’s minister of national education between 1955 and 1961. A prominent figure in 20th-century Portuguese cultural and scientific life, he played a central role in the modernization of the education system and the promotion of science and technology during the Estado Novo regime.

== Early life and education ==
Leite Pinto was born in Lisbon in 1902. He completed his secondary studies at Liceu Camões in 1919 and earned degrees in Mathematical Sciences and Geographic Engineering from the University of Lisbon in 1924.

He continued his studies in Paris, graduating in civil engineering from the École des Ponts et Chaussées and earning a doctorate in Astrophysics from the University of Paris. He also completed a statistics course at the Institut Henri Poincaré.

== Academic and professional career ==
He began teaching at Liceu Pedro Nunes (1924–1928) and later taught in Beja before becoming a Portuguese language lecturer at the Sorbonne (1931–1933). Upon returning to Portugal, he was a professor at several institutions, including the Instituto Superior de Ciências Económicas e Financeiras, the Army School, and Instituto Superior Técnico. He also served as rector of the Technical University of Lisbon between 1963 and 1966.

From 1943 to 1947, he was general manager of the Beira Alta Railway.

== Minister of National Education ==
Leite Pinto served as Minister of National Education from 1955 to 1961. During this time, he promoted reforms that expanded secondary and technical education and emphasized science and culture as public policy priorities.

== Humanitarian work during World War II ==
While managing the Beira Alta Railway during World War II, Leite Pinto helped organize trains that transported refugees fleeing Nazi persecution from the Portuguese coast to the Spanish frontier. Historian Tom Gallagher notes that "still hardly appreciated was the role of a future minister of education in rescuing European Jews later in the war."

He also worked with Moisés Bensabat Amzalak and others to support the transit of Jewish and other refugees through Portugal.

== Role in science and international cooperation ==
Leite Pinto was instrumental in establishing Portugal's nuclear energy policy, chairing the National Commission for Nuclear Energy. He led delegations for international agreements, including those on peaceful nuclear cooperation with Brazil.

He later served as president of the National Board for Scientific and Technological Research (Junta Nacional de Investigação Científica e Tecnológica) and as administrator of the Calouste Gulbenkian Foundation.

== Later life and exile ==
After the Carnation Revolution of 1974, Leite Pinto went into exile in Paris and then in Rio de Janeiro, where he held visiting professor positions. He returned to Portugal in 1980 and remained active in academic life until his death in 2000.

== Recognition ==
He was awarded the Grand Cross of several Portuguese orders, including Santiago da Espada, Cristo, Infante D. Henrique, and Instrução Pública, and was made a Knight Commander of the Order of the British Empire. He also received honors from Brazil, Spain, Italy, and Poland.

== Selected works ==
Leite Pinto was a prolific author, contributing to fields as diverse as astronomy, mathematics, education, and philosophy. His works include scientific monographs, technical manuals, philosophical essays, and speeches. Among his most notable publications are:

- Os Liceus, Escolas de Selecção (1925)
- Equações Diofantianas (1925)
- Determinação da Latitude (1926)
- A Cromosfera do Sol (1929)
- Os Descobrimentos Portugueses (1931)
- L’Astronomie Nautique du Portugal à l’Époque des Grandes Découvertes (1933)
- Sideróstatos, Elióstatos e Celóstatos (1934)
- Lições de Aritmética Racional (1945)
- As Comunicações na Política de Fomento (1952)
- Lições de Caminhos de Ferro (4 vols., 1954)
- Lições de Estatística (7 vols., 1955)
- Discursos Pedagógicos (6 vols., 1955–1961)
- Os Liceus e as Humanidades (1957)
- A Lição de Camões à Juventude de Hoje (1960)
- Uma Esquina da História (1962)
- A Expansão da Europa (1962)
- A Educação no Espaço Português (1963)
- Elogio do Professor Herculano de Carvalho (1963)
- Ser Chefe! (2nd ed., 1964)
- Lusitanidade (1965)
- Da Instrução Pública à Educação Nacional (1966)
- Da Instrução Primária à Educação Permanente (1966)
- Investigação Científica e Tecnológica (1967)
- Essa Palavra Universidade! (1968)
- O Papel da Universidade na Formação dos Dirigentes (1968)
- Modas que se Tornaram Hábitos (1969)
- O Ensino Humanista dos Jesuítas (1969)
- Objectivo e Posição do Ensino Liceal (1971)
- Santo António Padroeiro de Portugal (1976)
- O Comboio não Chegou à Tabela (1982)
- Anteambulação numa Mostra de Cartografia da Grande Lisboa (1983)
- A Saída da Família Real Portuguesa para o Brasil, a 29 de Novembro de 1807 (1991)

In addition to these titles, Leite Pinto delivered over 200 lectures and speeches, many of which were published in academic journals, conference proceedings, and cultural reviews.

== Legacy ==
Known for his intellectual rigor and independent thinking, Leite Pinto authored over thirty books and hundreds of articles and speeches on science, education, philosophy, and national identity.

== Bibliography ==
- "Francisco de Paula Leite Pinto" (PDF). Assembleia da República.
- "Francisco Leite Pinto | Arquivo de Ciência e Tecnologia" (in European Portuguese). 4 June 2014.
- Oliveira, Jaime da Costa (2003). "In Memória 2 – No Centenário do Nascimento de Francisco de Paula Leite Pinto". Fotobiografia de Francisco de Paula Leite Pinto. Sociedade de Geografia de Lisboa.
- Gallagher, Tom (2020). Salazar: The Dictator Who Refused to Die. Hurst & Company. p. 124. ISBN 9781787383883.
