= Civil Order of Alfonso X, the Wise =

Spanish civil order

Civil Order of Alfonso X, the Wise Orden Civil de Alfonso X el Sabio
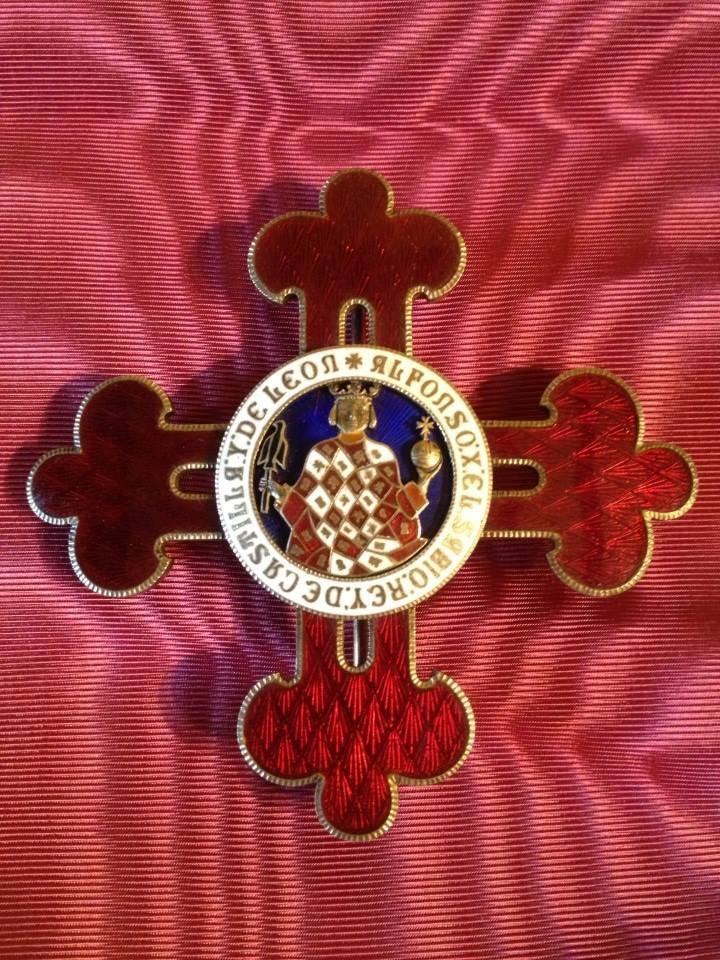
- Grand Cross Sash and Star of the Order

Awarded by the Spanish Monarch
- Type: Civil Order
- Established: 1902; 124 years ago
- Royal house: House of Bourbon-Spain
- Awarded for: Recognition of activities in the fields of education, science, culture, higher education and research.
- Status: Currently Constituted
- Grand Master: King Felipe VI
- Grand Chancellor: Milagros Tolón, Minister of Education
- Grades: Collar; Grand-Cross; Commander with Plaque; Commander; Cross
- Former grades: Lazo; Medal

Precedence
- Next (higher): Order of Civil Merit
- Next (lower): Order of the Cross of St. Raymond of Peñafort
- – The Ribbons of the Order

The Civil Order of Alfonso X the Wise (Spanish: Orden Civil de Alfonso X el Sabio) is a Spanish civil order established in 1939, recognising activities in the fields of education, science, culture, higher education and research.

The order was created on 23 May 1902 by Royal decree as the Order of Alfonso XII. In 1988 the order was reformed and given its current name. The main innovation of the 1988 reform was to discontinue the previous award's practice of distinguishing male and female achievements, thereby eliminating explicit sexual discrimination.

== Grades ==
The Civil order of Alfonso X, the Wise is divided into the following grades:

- Collar. Awarded to heads of state or government, heads of high state institutions, and heads of international organizations. This grade is awarded by Royal Decree with the proposal of the Minister of Education, the Order's Grand Chancellor. Holders of the collar are granted the honorific The Most Excellent. It is limited to six recipients.
- Grand Cross. Awarded for exceptional and evident degree of achievement in education, science, culture, teaching or research. This grade is awarded by Royal Decree with the proposal of the Minister of Education. Holders of the grand cross are granted the honorific The Most Excellent (Excelentísimo señor o señora). It is limited to 500 recipients.
- Commander with Plaque. This grade and the remaining grades are awarded based on the merits of the recipients in their field. Holders of the Commander with star are granted the honorific The Illustrious (Ilustrísimo señor o señora). It is limited to 750 recipients.
- Commander.
- Cross (formerly Knight's Cross 1939–1988).
- Lazo (1955–1988) Knight's Cross suspended from a bow for wear by female recipients.
- Medal (1939–1988).

Organizations and other legal entities may be honored with the following:

- Corbata. Awarded by royal decree, displayed on the flag of the organization. It is limited to 350 recipients.
- Placa de Honor.

== Insignia ==
Insignia
Collar	Grand Cross and Commander with Plaque	Commander
Cross		Medal

== See also ==
- List of Civil Order of Alfonso X, the Wise recipients
