= Minister for Trade Union Relations =

- Ministro de Relaciones Sindicales
- Coat of Arms used by Francoist Spain
- Type: Minister without portfolio
- Member of: Council of Ministers; Spanish Syndical Organization
- Seat: Madrid
- Appointer: Head of State on advice of the Prime Minister since 1973; Monarch on advice of the Prime Minister since 1975
- Term length: No fixed term
- Constituting instrument: Trade Union Act of 1971
- Precursor: National Delegate of Trade Unions
- Formation: 19 February 1971
- First holder: Enrique García-Ramal
- Final holder: Enrique de la Mata
- Abolished: 4 July 1977
- Succession: Minister of Labour

The Minister for Trade Union Relations (Spanish: Ministro de Relaciones Sindicales) was a Spanish Cabinet position. The holder was considered a minister without portfolio and was responsible for the relations between the Government and the Spanish Syndical Organization (known as Sindicato Vertical, the only union allowed during the dictatorship of Francisco Franco).

The position was active during the last years of the dictatorship and it was not just responsible for the relations with the Trade Union but the direct management of it. The minister chaired the main bodies of the Trade Union. Created by the Trade Union Act of 1971, the office existed until 1977 when the freedom of assembly and of association were approved and it started the process to disband the Trade Union Organization. Due to this, the powers of the office were transferred to the Ministry of Labour.

== Powers ==
The powers of the office were:

- To maintain communication between the Trade Union Organization and the Trade Unions [integrated in the Trade Union Organization] with the Government and especially to propose to it the agreements and initiatives of the Congress and of the Executive Trade Union Committee.
- To chair over the Trade Union Executive Committee and the Trade Union Congress and submit for its consideration the matters of competence of these Bodies as it deems pertinent.
- To ensure that the Trade Union Organization and the Trade Unions that compose it conform in their performance to the provisions of the Laws and the basic principles that inspire the Spanish Trade Union Organization.
- To appoint and remove or to propose, where appropriate, of the non-elective positions, after a report from the Trade Union Executive Committee or the corresponding collegiate body.
- To propose to the Government the regulatory provisions that, under this Act, fall within its competence and adopt those attributed to it.

== List of ministers ==
| Portrait | Name | Took office | Left office | Notes |
|---|---|---|---|---|
| | Enrique García-Ramal | 19 February 1971 | 3 January 1974 | |
| | Alejandro Fernández Sordo | 3 January 1974 | 11 December 1975 | |
| | Rodolfo Martín Villa | 11 December 1975 | 7 July 1976 | |
| | Enrique de la Mata | 7 July 1976 | 4 June 1977 | |
