= Adolfo Martín-Gamero =

Spanish politician

Minister of Information and Tourism of Spain
- In office 12 December 1975 – 5 July 1976
- Prime Minister: Carlos Arias Navarro
- Preceded by: León Herrera Esteban
- Succeeded by: Andrés Reguera

Personal details
- Born: Adolfo Martín-Gamero y González-Posada; 17 February 1917 Madrid, Spain
- Died: 1 September 1987 (aged 70) Santander, Spain
- Party: Nonpartisan (National Movement)

Adolfo Martín-Gamero y González-Posada (17 February 1917 – 1 September 1987) was a Spanish politician who served as Minister of Information and Tourism of Spain between 1975 and 1976, during the Francoist dictatorship.
