= Pío Cabanillas Gallas =

Spanish jurist and politician (1923 – 1991)

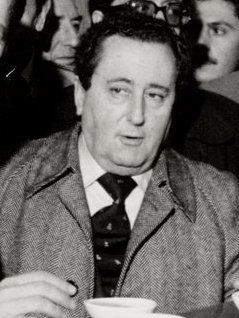
- Pío Cabanillas in March 1979

Minister of Justice of Spain
- In office 31 August 1981 – 3 December 1982
- Prime Minister: Leopoldo Calvo-Sotelo
- Preceded by: Francisco Fernández Ordóñez
- Succeeded by: Fernando Ledesma Bartret

Minister of Information and Tourism
- In office 4 January 1974 – 24 October 1974
- Prime Minister: Carlos Arias Navarro
- Preceded by: Fernando de Liñán
- Succeeded by: León Herrera Esteban

Personal details
- Born: 13 November 1923 Pontevedra
- Died: 10 October 1991 (aged 67) Madrid
- Party: People's Party
- Children: Pío Cabanillas Alonso

Pío Cabanillas Gallas (13 November 1923 – 10 October 1991) was a Spanish jurist and politician, who held different cabinet posts and served as a deputy in the European Parliament.

== Early life and education ==
Cabanillas was born 13 November 1923 in Pontevedra. His father was a lawyer, and his uncle, Roman C., was a poet. Cabanillas held a law degree.

== Career ==
Cabanillas was a member of the Council of the Realm, which was the highest advisory body in the Francoist Spain. He was the minister of information and tourism in the cabinet led by Prime Minister Arias Navarro which was formed on 4 January 1974 under Francisco Franco. Cabanillas replaced Fernando de Liñán in the post. Cabanillas was removed from office in October 1974 on the orders of Franco due to "being too liberal in lifting press censorship." Cabanillas' successor as minister of information and tourism was León Herrera Esteban.

Cabanillas was appointed justice minister on 31 August 1981, replacing Francisco Fernández Ordóñez in the post. His term ended on when Fernando Ledesma Bartret was appointed justice minister on 3 December 1982. In 1986, Cabanillas became a member of the European Parliament for the People's Party and served at the parliament until 1991.

== Views and activities ==
Cabanillas was close to Manuel Fraga, former minister. Cabanillas was instrumental both in drafting the 1966 press law which dissolved the press censorship in Spain and in the transition period of Spain from dictatorship to democracy in the 1970s. Although he was described as a reformist during the late Francoist era, he was viewed as a conservative in his later years while serving at the European Parliament.

== Death ==
Cabanillas died of a heart attack in Madrid on 10 October 1991.
