= Spanish Syndical Organization =

Trade union in Francoist Spain (1940–77)

- Organización Sindical Española
- Founded: 26 January 1940
- Dissolved: 6 December 1977
- Headquarters: Casa Sindical, Madrid
- Location: Francoist Spain
- Members: All employed citizens
- Key people: See Leadership section
- Publication: Pueblo
- Parent organization: FET y de las JONS

The Spanish Syndical Organization (Spanish: Organización Sindical Española; OSE), popularly known in Spain as the Sindicato Vertical (the "Vertical Trade Union"), was the sole legal trade union for most of the Francoist dictatorship. A public-law entity created in 1940 and defined as subordinate to the ruling party FET y de las JONS, the vertically structured OSE was a core part of the project for frameworking the Economy and the State in Francoist Spain, following the trend of the new type of "harmonicist" and corporatist understanding of labour relations vouching for worker–employer collaboration developed in totalitarian regimes such as those of Nazi Germany and Fascist Italy in the first half of the 20th century. Up until the early 1950s, it internally worked—at least on a rhetorical basis—according to the discourse of national syndicalism. Previous unions, like the anarchist CNT and the socialist UGT, were outlawed and driven underground, and joining the OSE was mandatory for all employed citizens. It was disbanded in 1977.

== History ==
The OSE was founded in 1940, established in a January 1940 Law of "Syndical Unity", while its structure was developed through a December 1940 law, in which the OSE was defined as subordinate to the FET y de las JONS, the ruling party of the state, what was reflected in the name "Syndical Organization of the FET and of the JONS". Its ideological fundamentals date back to the 1938 Fuero del Trabajo law.

OSE held its first congress February 27, 1961 – March 4, 1961. The organisation itself claimed to have roots in the trade union activity of the National-Syndicalist Workers Central (CONS), founded in 1935. CONS had been, as a result of the Unification Decree between the Falangists and the Carlists in 1937, fused with the National-Syndicalist Employers Central (CENS) into the National-Syndical Centrals (Centrales Nacional-Sindicalistas). The idea of organising workers, technicians and employers within one "vertical" structure was also integrated in OSE, and the CNS were incorporated into OSE.

At the very beginning of the Francoist State, wages were directly fixed by the state and only later could workers and employers agree upon their wages through this vertical union. This organisation was the practical consequence of the fascist ideal for industrial relations in a corporate state. In it, all the workers, called "producers," and their employers had the right to choose their representatives through elections.

In this organisation, workers and employers supposedly bargained equally. Strikes were forbidden and firing a worker was very expensive and difficult, as the fascism had "bettered capitalism" and had "succeeded in harmonically balancing workers' and employers' interests". In reality, candidates for these elections had to be approved by Francoist Spain and all the process was heavily controlled, as fascism had a very interventionist policy towards the labour market: full employment for men, even at the expense of low wages or inflation, almost no right to work for married women and no unemployment benefits at all.

At the very end of the Francoist State, the sindicato vertical lost its always limited power and illegal trade unions gained force. This led some pragmatic employers to deal with these illegal unions and forsake the "vertical" one. It disappeared in 1977, during the Spanish transition to democracy.

=== Clandestine PCE presence ===
The banned Communist Party of Spain (PCE) considered that the "union" was heavily lopsided in favour of capital but was there to stay, and decided to infiltrate it with their candidates in order to achieve practical gains for the workers' conditions. This was the basis for the communist Workers' Commissions.

== Leadership ==
No.	Portrait	Name (Birth–Death)	Term of office			Political party	Ref.
No.	Portrait	Name (Birth–Death)	Took office	Left office	Time in office	Political party	Ref.
National Delegates
1		Gerardo Salvador Merino (1910–1971)	9 September 1939	13 September 1941	2 years, 4 days	Movimiento Nacional	
–		Manuel Valdés Larrañaga (1909–2001); Acting	13 September 1941	18 December 1941	96 days	Movimiento Nacional	
2		Fermín Sanz-Orrio (1901–1998)	18 December 1941	7 September 1951	9 years, 263 days	Movimiento Nacional	
3		José Solís Ruiz (1913–1990)	7 September 1951	29 October 1969	18 years, 52 days	Movimiento Nacional	
4		Enrique García-Ramal (1914–1987); Cabinet-level official in the Franco VIII Government	29 October 1969	11 June 1973	3 years, 225 days	Movimiento Nacional	
Ministers of Trade Union Relations
1		Enrique García-Ramal (1914–1987)	11 June 1973	3 January 1974	206 days	Movimiento Nacional	
2		Alejandro Fernández Sordo (1921–2009)	3 January 1974	11 December 1975	1 year, 342 days	Movimiento Nacional	
3		Rodolfo Martín Villa (born 1934)	11 December 1975	7 July 1976	209 days	Movimiento Nacional	
4		Enrique de la Mata (1933–1987)	7 July 1976	4 July 1977	362 days	Movimiento Nacional	

== See also ==
- Movimiento Nacional
- Minister for Trade Union Relations
