= Leadership opinion polling for the 1989 Spanish general election =

In the run up to the 1989 Spanish general election, various organisations carry out opinion polling to gauge the opinions that voters hold towards political leaders. Results of such polls are displayed in this article. The date range for these opinion polls is from the previous general election, held on 22 June 1986, to the day the next election was held, on 29 October 1989.

== Preferred prime minister ==
The tables below list opinion polling on leader preferences to become prime minister.

=== All candidates ===
Polling firm/Commissioner	Fieldwork date	Sample size							Other/ None/ Not care	Question	Lead
Polling firm/Commissioner	Fieldwork date	Sample size	González PSOE	Fraga AP	Hernández Mancha AP	Suárez CDS	Iglesias IU	Anguita IU	Other/ None/ Not care	Question	Lead
CIS	20–25 Apr 1988	2,496	36.0	10.0	2.0	15.0	–	6.0	15.0	16.0	21.0
CIS	15–23 Mar 1988	27,377	40.0	9.0	3.0	15.0	–	6.0	12.0	15.0	25.0
CIS	22–26 Jan 1988	2,497	42.0	–	7.0	16.0	4.0	–	15.0	16.0	26.0
CIS	14–17 Nov 1987	2,489	42.0	–	8.0	22.0	4.0	–	–	24.0	20.0
CIS	20–22 May 1987	2,490	44.0	–	11.0	21.0	4.0	–	–	20.0	23.0

=== González vs. Guerra ===
Polling firm/Commissioner	Fieldwork date	Sample size			Other/ None/ Not care	Question	Lead
Polling firm/Commissioner	Fieldwork date	Sample size	González PSOE	Guerra PSOE	Other/ None/ Not care	Question	Lead
CIS	20–22 May 1987	2,490	74.0	5.0	–	21.0	69.0

=== González vs. Aznar ===
Polling firm/Commissioner	Fieldwork date	Sample size			Other/ None/ Not care	Question	Lead
Polling firm/Commissioner	Fieldwork date	Sample size	González PSOE	Aznar PP	Other/ None/ Not care	Question	Lead
CIS	23–27 Sep 1989	2,482	53.0	16.0	–	31.0	37.0
CIS	16–20 Sep 1989	2,495	53.0	15.0	–	32.0	38.0

=== González vs. Fraga ===
Polling firm/Commissioner	Fieldwork date	Sample size			Other/ None/ Not care	Question	Lead
Polling firm/Commissioner	Fieldwork date	Sample size	González PSOE	Fraga AP/PP	Other/ None/ Not care	Question	Lead
CIS	2–5 Sep 1989	2,471	59.0	16.0	–	25.0	43.0
CIS	30 Jan–9 Feb 1989	27,287	51.0	19.0	–	30.0	32.0
CIS	20–22 May 1987	2,490	65.0	20.0	–	15.0	45.0

=== González vs. Hernández Mancha ===
Polling firm/Commissioner	Fieldwork date	Sample size			Other/ None/ Not care	Question	Lead
Polling firm/Commissioner	Fieldwork date	Sample size	González PSOE	Hernández Mancha AP	Other/ None/ Not care	Question	Lead
CIS	15–23 Mar 1988	27,377	59.0	14.0	13.0	14.0	45.0
CIS	20–22 May 1987	2,490	65.0	18.0	–	17.0	47.0

=== González vs. Suárez ===
Polling firm/Commissioner	Fieldwork date	Sample size			Other/ None/ Not care	Question	Lead
Polling firm/Commissioner	Fieldwork date	Sample size	González PSOE	Suárez CDS	Other/ None/ Not care	Question	Lead
CIS	23–27 Sep 1989	2,482	50.0	21.0	–	29.0	29.0
CIS	16–20 Sep 1989	2,495	51.0	19.0	–	30.0	32.0
CIS	2–5 Sep 1989	2,471	52.0	21.0	–	27.0	31.0
CIS	30 Jan–9 Feb 1989	27,287	43.0	25.0	–	32.0	18.0
CIS	15–23 Mar 1988	27,377	50.0	26.0	12.0	12.0	24.0
CIS	20–22 May 1987	2,490	51.0	33.0	–	16.0	18.0

=== González vs. Anguita ===
Polling firm/Commissioner	Fieldwork date	Sample size			Other/ None/ Not care	Question	Lead
Polling firm/Commissioner	Fieldwork date	Sample size	González PSOE	Anguita IU	Other/ None/ Not care	Question	Lead
CIS	23–27 Sep 1989	2,482	53.0	12.0	–	35.0	41.0
CIS	16–20 Sep 1989	2,495	52.0	12.0	–	36.0	40.0
CIS	2–5 Sep 1989	2,471	58.0	12.0	–	30.0	46.0
CIS	30 Jan–9 Feb 1989	27,287	51.0	11.0	–	38.0	40.0

=== Guerra vs. Fraga ===
Polling firm/Commissioner	Fieldwork date	Sample size			Other/ None/ Not care	Question	Lead
Polling firm/Commissioner	Fieldwork date	Sample size	Guerra PSOE	Fraga AP	Other/ None/ Not care	Question	Lead
CIS	20–22 May 1987	2,490	42.0	31.0	–	27.0	11.0

=== Guerra vs. Hernández Mancha ===
Polling firm/Commissioner	Fieldwork date	Sample size			Other/ None/ Not care	Question	Lead
Polling firm/Commissioner	Fieldwork date	Sample size	Guerra PSOE	Hernández Mancha AP	Other/ None/ Not care	Question	Lead
CIS	20–22 May 1987	2,490	44.0	26.0	–	30.0	18.0

=== Guerra vs. Suárez ===
Polling firm/Commissioner	Fieldwork date	Sample size			Other/ None/ Not care	Question	Lead
Polling firm/Commissioner	Fieldwork date	Sample size	Guerra PSOE	Suárez CDS	Other/ None/ Not care	Question	Lead
CIS	20–22 May 1987	2,490	30.0	51.0	–	19.0	21.0

=== Fraga vs. Aznar ===
Polling firm/Commissioner	Fieldwork date	Sample size			Other/ None/ Not care	Question	Lead
Polling firm/Commissioner	Fieldwork date	Sample size	Fraga PP	Aznar PP	Other/ None/ Not care	Question	Lead
Opina/La Vanguardia	7–11 Oct 1989	2,800	22.9	32.4	31.6	13.1	9.5

=== Aznar vs. Suárez ===
Polling firm/Commissioner	Fieldwork date	Sample size			Other/ None/ Not care	Question	Lead
Polling firm/Commissioner	Fieldwork date	Sample size	Aznar PP	Suárez CDS	Other/ None/ Not care	Question	Lead
CIS	23–27 Sep 1989	2,482	19.0	38.0	–	43.0	19.0
CIS	16–20 Sep 1989	2,495	18.0	37.0	–	45.0	19.0

=== Fraga vs. Suárez ===
Polling firm/Commissioner	Fieldwork date	Sample size			Other/ None/ Not care	Question	Lead
Polling firm/Commissioner	Fieldwork date	Sample size	Fraga AP/PP	Suárez CDS	Other/ None/ Not care	Question	Lead
CIS	2–5 Sep 1989	2,471	17.0	47.0	–	36.0	30.0
CIS	30 Jan–9 Feb 1989	27,287	18.0	47.0	–	35.0	29.0
CIS	20–22 May 1987	2,490	17.0	62.0	–	21.0	45.0

=== Hernández Mancha vs. Suárez ===
Polling firm/Commissioner	Fieldwork date	Sample size			Other/ None/ Not care	Question	Lead
Polling firm/Commissioner	Fieldwork date	Sample size	Hernández Mancha AP	Suárez CDS	Other/ None/ Not care	Question	Lead
CIS	15–23 Mar 1988	27,377	12.0	52.0	19.0	17.0	40.0
CIS	20–22 May 1987	2,490	14.0	66.0	–	20.0	52.0

== Approval ratings ==
The tables below list the public approval ratings of the leaders and leading candidates of the main political parties in Spain.

=== Felipe González ===
Polling firm/Commissioner	Fieldwork date	Sample size	Felipe González (PSOE)			
Polling firm/Commissioner	Fieldwork date	Sample size	check	X mark	Question	Net
CIS	23–27 Sep 1989	2,482	49.0	28.0	23.0	+21.0
CIS	16–20 Sep 1989	2,495	48.0	28.0	24.0	+20.0
CIS	2–5 Sep 1989	2,471	49.0	31.0	20.0	+18.0
CIS	11–16 May 1989	3,072	45.0	38.0	17.0	+7.0
CIS	30 Jan–9 Feb 1989	27,287	42.0	36.0	22.0	+6.0
CIS	10–12 Jan 1989	2,497	45.0	36.0	18.0	+9.0
CIS	16–19 Dec 1988	2,498	37.0	41.0	22.0	−4.0
CIS	14–18 Jul 1988	2,443	53.0	31.0	16.0	+22.0
CIS	15–23 Mar 1988	27,377	52.0	30.0	18.0	+22.0
CIS	22–26 Jan 1988	2,497	49.0	33.0	18.0	+16.0
CIS	14–17 Nov 1987	2,489	51.0	34.0	15.0	+17.0
CIS	17–21 Sep 1987	2,488	56.0	29.0	15.0	+27.0
CIS	12–16 Feb 1987	2,497	53.0	34.0	13.0	+19.0
CIS	19–22 Oct 1986	2,484	60.0	25.0	15.0	+35.0
Gallup/Ya	19–21 Oct 1986	?	44.0	28.0	28.0	+16.0
CIS	18–21 Sep 1986	2,813	59.0	28.0	13.0	+31.0
