= Landelino Lavilla =

Spanish politician (1934–2020)

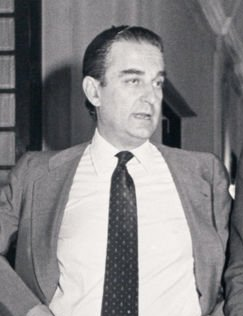
- Lavilla in 1981

President of the Congress of Deputies
- In office 6 April 1979 – 18 November 1982
- Monarch: Juan Carlos I
- Preceded by: Fernando Álvarez de Miranda
- Succeeded by: Gregorio Peces-Barba

Minister of Justice
- In office 5 July 1976 – 6 April 1979
- Monarch: Juan Carlos I
- Prime Minister: Adolfo Suárez
- Preceded by: Antonio Garrigues y Díaz-Cañabate
- Succeeded by: Íñigo Cavero Lataillade

Member of the Congress of Deputies
- In office 6 April 1979 – 18 November 1982
- Constituency: Jaén
- In office 18 November 1982 – 28 July 1983
- Constituency: Madrid

Member of the Senate
- In office 15 June 1977 – 6 April 1979
- Constituency: Royal appointment

Personal details
- Born: Landelino Lavilla Alsina; 6 August 1934 Lleida, Spain
- Died: 13 April 2020 (aged 85) Madrid, Spain
- Party: Union of the Democratic Centre
- Spouse: Juana Rubira
- Children: 4
- Education: University of Zaragoza; Complutense University of Madrid

Landelino Lavilla Alsina (6 August 1934 – 13 April 2020) was a Spanish lawyer and politician who served as the minister of justice from 1976 to 1979. He also served as member of parliament and as senator. His most important role was as President of the Congress of Deputies during the coup d'état of 23-F in 1981. Jurist Eduardo García de Enterría called him the "principal architect of the transition to democracy".

== Early life and education ==
Lavilla was born in Lleida on 6 August 1934. He received law degrees from the University of Zaragoza and Complutense University of Madrid.

== Career and activities ==
Lavilla was a lawyer by profession. He joined the board of lawyers of the Court of Auditors in 1958 and of the State Council in 1959. He joined the Tácitos, Catholic reformist group, in 1974. He became a senior member of the Christian Democratic Party. The group published articles in the Catholic daily, Ya, beginning by 1972. He was the undersecretary of industry in the last cabinet of Franco from 1974 to 1976.

=== Minister of Justice ===
Lavilla was appointed minister of justice in the first cabinet of Adolfo Suárez on 5 July 1976, replacing Antonio Garrigues y Díaz-Cañabate in the post. Lavilla was part of the Tacito group in the cabinet along with Leopoldo Calvo Sotelo, Andrés Reguera, Eduardo Carriles, Enrique de la Mata, Marcelino Oreja and Alfonso Osorio. He retained his post following the democratic elections in June 1977.

He drafted the 1977 Political Reform Act that was approved by the congress in November 1977 and implemented a legal process that paved the way for the legalization of all major political groups, including communists and PSOE.

Lavilla's term ended on 6 April 1979 when Íñigo Cavero was appointed justice minister.

=== President of the Congress of Deputies and 23-F ===
Lavilla was appointed senator in 1977 and was in office until 1978. He was elected to the Congress of Deputies in 1979, representing Jaén province.

He served as speaker of the Congress from 1979 to 1982 in the first legislature after the approval of the new constitution. On 23 February 1981, members of the Civil Guard led by Antonio Tejero burst into the chamber in a failed coup d'état. Lavilla faced Tejero saying that "in this chamber, the orders are given by the presidency. This is over. Vacate [the premises]." The colonel obeyed, and the deputies were able to occupy their seats after getting down. During the night of 23–24 February, he offered Tejero the members of the parliament board as hostages and asked that they free the members of the government and the legislators, but Tejero rejected the move.

During Lavilla's term the first investiture debate took place according to the new Constitution; 33 organic laws, 231 ordinary laws and 71 law decrees were approved, and the first failed vote of confidence and a question of confidence were presented.

Before the 1982 general election Lavilla led the Christian Democrat party. He was re-elected in 1982, representing Madrid province, but resigned from the seat in 1983 and was succeeded by Leopoldo Calvo Sotelo in the post.

In 1982 Lavilla also assumed the presidency of the Union of the Democratic Centre. Faced with the crisis of the party derived from the bad electoral result in the general elections, he resigned from the office in February 1983.

=== Member of the Council of State and later life ===
Lavilla was named a permanent member of the Council of State by a royal decree dated 28 July 1983 at the proposal of Prime Minister, an office which he held until his death in 2020. On 28 December 1995 he was appointed chairman of the Council's first section.

On 8 February 1999 Lavilla took office as a permanent member of the Royal Academy of Jurisprudence and Legislation and was its president between 2003 and 2012, being re-elected in 2008.

In early 2014, he received a call from King Juan Carlos I, who summoned him for a meeting where he explained that he was preparing his abdication as monarch and asked him for advice. Years later, Lavilla revealed that he was in charge of preparing all the papers and the design of the succession process. He reached a preliminary conclusion: the abdication law should be very brief so as not to stir a debate in Congress.

In addition, he was a member of the advisory committee of FRIDE, a Madrid-based now defunct think tank organization.

== Personal life and death ==
Lavilla was married to Juana Rubira García Valdecasas, and they had four children. He died on 13 April 2020 at the age of 85 from an undisclosed illness.

== Honors ==
- Grand Cross of the Order of Civil Merit (1974)
- Grand Cross of the Order of Charles III (1979)
- Grand Cross of the Order of St. Raymond of Peñafort (1985)
- Knight Grand Cross of the Order of Isabella the Catholic (2010)
