= Memoria viva de la transición =

- Cover of the fifth edition
- Author: Leopoldo Calvo Sotelo
- Language: Spanish
- Publisher: Plaza & Janes
- Publication date: 1990
- Pages: 286
- ISBN: 9788478630103

Living memory of the Spanish transition (Spanish: Memoria viva de la transición) is until now the only political memories book written by a president of the government during the Spanish transition. It is the first of the books published by Leopoldo Calvo-Sotelo, which was followed by an out-of-office politician's papers (Papeles de un cesante, 1999), Family Talks (Pláticas de familia (1878–2003), 2003) and On External Transition (Sobre la Transición Exterior, 2005).

"All the writings and works by Leopoldo Calvo-Sotelo are of a historical and literary interest. Their pages emanate precision and intellectual rigour covered by smooth irony. In them, the personal conception of the different political issues surrounding his period as a president is revealed"

Living memory of the Spanish transition was released in June 1990, published in Barcelona by publisher house Plaza&Janés, work dedicated to his wife, Pilar Ibáñez-Martín Mellado, and also to his closest partners in Moncloa: Luis Sánchez Merlo, Ignacio Aguirre, Matías Rodríguez Inciarte and Eugenio Galdón.

These memoirs, published eight years after leaving the Palace of Moncloa are, according to Professor Bernabé Sarabia, "an assertive analysis of a few years that start when, being there the first Government of the Monarchy, he is appointed Minister of Trade in 1975, and finish with the backlash from UCD’s tremendous defeat that, in 1982, Calvo Sotelo obtains as President of the Government against PSOE"

Leopoldo Calvo-Sotelo himself describes as follows the topics approached: "the prehistory of the transition, Suárez’s dismissal, the proposal of a successor, the investiture and Government from 1982, what happened after 23 F, the rise and fall of UCD, the wrongly named natural majority, the autonomies subject, the Atlantic controversy, the negotiations with the Common Market, the entrepreneurs and the economic policy" These are followed by four humorous extra verses titled: "The Moncloa complex"; "The Council of Ministers"; "Defector’s Little Payslip" and "I do not accuse myself". Several notes close the book, some annexes gathering parliament debates in the Courts, some pictures and vignettes and an onomastic index.

The sources used are, as listed in the prologue, "notebooks that were used by the author as tools for his work in the Ministries or in La Moncloa", letters and "profusely noted" agendas from the Council of Ministers". But he also investigated in the deposits of the library of the Spanish Congress of Deputies.

Camilo José Cela presented the book in Madrid on 31 May 1990. According to the Nobel Prize in Literature winner, "To me, Living memory of the Spanish transition is one of the most intelligent, acute and humorous political memories books ever written in Spain during this century."

Professor Pablo Pérez López addressed it an extensive article under the title "The reader who presided the government", from which the following passage was extracted: "The image left by Living memory is a high idea on politics, and that is why it is an enemy of the dribbling and contemptible politics. It unveils a man who longed for a change of his time to take Spain where he believed it belonged and where it was not at that time"

Arcadi Espada wrote about it: "His memories, together with Fernández de la Mora’s, are the best book ever written by a Spanish politician after the civil war"

For journalist Incitatus, "it is, with no possible comparison, the best political memoirs book published in Spain during the whole 20th century."

Living memory of the transition had six editions and was among the most sold non-fiction books during 25 weeks along the last semester of year 1990.
