= Spanish Democratic Union =

Spanish Democratic Union Unión Democrática Española
- Founded: March 1975
- Dissolved: 4 April 1977
- Merged into: Christian Democratic Party
- Ideology: Conservatism
- Political position: Centre-right

The Spanish Democratic Union (Spanish: Unión Democrática Española; UDE) was a Spanish political party founded in 1975 as a political association, then as a party from August 1976. Among the party's most notable members were government ministers in Adolfo Suárez's first cabinet: Alfonso Osorio, Eduardo Carriles, Andrés Reguera Guajardo and Enrique de la Mata.

== History ==
The party was led by former public works minister Federico Silva Muñoz until October 1976, when he stepped down over discrepancies with his party on the issue of forming an alliance of centre-right and conservative parties; such an alliance would materialize into the formation of the People's Alliance (AP), which Muñoz would join after splitting from the UDE.

On 4 April 1977, UDE would merge with the Christian Democratic People's Party (PPDC) into the newly formed Christian Democratic Party (PDC), which would in turn eventually merge into the Union of the Democratic Centre in December 1977, and dissolved in February 1978.
