= Antonio Valdés (disambiguation) =

Antonio Valdés (1930–2021), known as El Ratón Valdés, was a Mexican comic actor.

Antonio Valdés may also refer to:

- Antonio Valdés y Fernández Bazán (1744–1816), Spanish naval officer
- Antonio Valdés González-Roldán (1926–2007), Spanish politician
- Antonio Valdés Herrera (1578–1657), Spanish prelate of the Roman Catholic Church
