= Carriles =

Carriles is a surname. Notable people with the surname include:

- Eduardo Carriles (1923–2020), Spanish lawyer, businessman and politician
- José Manuel Carriles (born 1963), Spanish golfer
- Luis Posada Carriles (1928–2018), Cuban exile militant and Central Intelligence Agency agent
- Lupe Carriles (1913–1964), Mexican character actress
