= Salvat =

Salvat is a common given name and surname. It may refer to:

== People ==
Given name

- Salvat Etchart (1924-1985), French writer

Middle name

- Joaquim Salvat Besora (born 1980), Spanish-born Andorran international footballer and former futsal player
- Manuel Salvat Dalmau (1925-2012), Spanish publisher

Surname

- André Salvat (1920-2017), French military colonel
- Enrique Salvat (born 1950), Cuban fencer
- Frank Salvat (1934–2013), British athlete Olympian and runner
- Joan Salvat-Papasseit (1894-1924), Catalan poet
- Josef Salvat, Australian singer-songwriter
- Julienne Salvat (1932–2019), French teacher, poet, femme de lettres, actress
- Sebastián Salvat (born 1967), Argentine rugby union player

== Others ==
- Enciclopedia Salvat, Spanish-language encyclopedia
