= Alfredo Sánchez Bella =

Spanish historian and diplomat

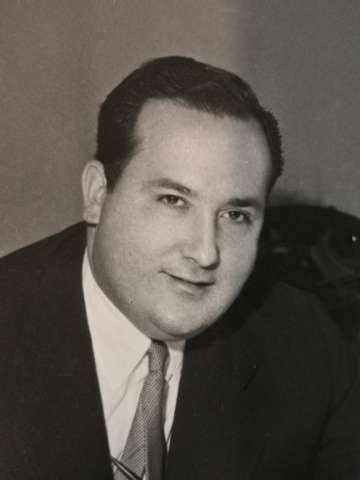

Minister of Information and Tourism Secretary of the Council of Ministers
- In office 30 October 1969 – 9 June 1973
- Prime Minister: Francisco Franco
- Preceded by: Manuel Fraga
- Succeeded by: Fernando de Liñán

Personal details
- Born: Alfredo Sánchez Bella; 2 October 1916 Tordesilos, Kingdom of Spain
- Died: 24 April 1999 (aged 82) Madrid, Spain
- Party: ACNP (National Movement)

Alfredo Sánchez Bella (2 October 1916 – 24 April 1999) was a Spanish politician. In 1948 he founded a magazine entitled Mundo Hispánico which became one of the state media outlets. He served as Minister of Information and Tourism of Spain between 1969 and 1973, during the Francoist dictatorship. He was a member of the National Catholic Association of Propagandists.

== Bibliography ==
- Sáez Alba, A. (1974). "Introducción a la ACNP". La otra cosa nostra. La Asociación Católica Nacional de Propagandistas y el caso de El Correo de Andalucía (in Spanish). Ruedo ibérico.
- Martín Puerta, Antonio (2015). "La Asociación Católica Nacional de Propagandistas durante la fase central del régimen de Franco". Hispania Sacra. 67 (135): 303–338. doi:10.3989/hs.2015.009. ISSN 0018-215X.
