= A Voz de Vilalba =

A Voz de Vilalba was a newspaper published in Vilalba, Spain between 1983 and 1986. During these years, twenty-seven numbers and some special numbers were published, and the average edition was five hundred copies. Some of their subscribers were prominent figures as the important intellectual Ramon Piñeiro, the historian Ramón Villares, the politician Manuel Fraga Iribarne, the player of the Deportivo da Coruña Vicente Celeiro or the Cardinal Antonio Maria Rouco Varela.

In 2007 the Rey Juan Carlos University, of Madrid, and the Institute of Estudos Chairegos, of Vilalba, edited, with the sponsorship of the Consellaría de Innovación e Industria and the Sociedade de Xestión do Xacobeo, the complete facsimile edition of the newspaper. The volume, with a preface by Ramón Villares, Chairman of the Consello da Culture Galega (Galician Culture Council), and presented by the teacher and chairman of the Iescha, Jose Luis Novo Cazón, contains a wide introductory study done by the teacher Felipe R. Debasa Navalpotro, of the URJC, the philosopher Antón Baamonde, the provincial deputy Xosé González Barcia and the former editors of the publication, Moncho Paz, Paulo Naseiro and Mario Paz González.

== History ==
The date of its founding (29 June 1983) almost coincided with the approval in Parliament of Galicia of the Law on Language Normalisation, which was enacted two weeks before, on 15 June. This information is not coincidental if we think that from the very moment of its appearance, A Voz de Vilalba would become a symbol, among others, of how the use of a language can be extended to all areas of life, and not only confined, because of the diglossia, to a plot exclusively linked to the traditional life.

To this consolidation of the publication as a small landmark in the task of building a cultural environment suitable and an own identity, necessary for the community in those years of political transition, was a help, no doubt, the Exposition of World Press which was organized by the three founders in collaboration with Xosé Sánchez Domínguez, from A Coruña, in the summer of 1985 and which reached an enormous impact, and was echoed by the media in Galicia.

The three founders of the newspaper (Moncho Paz, Paulo Naseiro and Mario Paz González) were in 1983 only eleven and twelve years old. This unusual precocity makes them, in the words of the professor at the Rey Juan Carlos University, of Madrid, Felipe R. Debasa, "probably the youngest editors in the Spanish National Library". In 2008, twenty-five years after the birth of the newspaper, his spirit was recovered through new technologies in a website (www.avozdevilalba.com) in which they want to maintain the eagerness to inform and the defense freedom of expression that always characterized the publication.

== Bibliography ==
- Corbelle, Mayte. "Periodistas precoces". El Progreso (31-VIII-2004), p. 16.
- Debasa Navalpotro, Felipe R. et alii. A Voz de Vilalba. Xornal ao servizo do pobo (1983-1986). Madrid: Dickynson. 2007.
- González Barcia, José María. "A Voz de Vilalba". El Progreso (13-X-2006), p. 18.
- Grande, Antón. "A Voz de Villalba, un xornal con carácter mensual que editan tres xóvenes escolares". El Progreso (31-VIII-1984), p. 25.
- París, Manuel. "Aquela mostra de prensa mundial". ABC (23-VII-2006), p. 40.
- Rodríguez, Rosa. "Xogando a ser xornalistas". Galicia-Hoxe (29-II-2008), p. 46.
- Roig Rechou, Blanca-Ana (dir.). Informe de Literatura 2007. Compostela: Centro Ramón Piñeiro. 2008, pp. 519–520.
- Varela, Froilán. "El Iescha hará un facsímil de la cabecera A Voz de Vilalba". El Progreso (19-V-2006), p. 21.
