= Pláticas de familia =

2003 book by Leopoldo Calvo-Sotelo

Family talks (1878–2003) (Spanish: Pláticas de familia (1878–2003)) is the third book by Leopoldo Calvo-Sotelo, published by La Esfera de los libros in year 2003, four years after his previous work, Papers from an Unemployed Person. The title quotes Zorrilla's Don Juan Tenorio, a book that was very important to the author.

The book was presented in the historic restaurant of Lhardy in Madrid, 3 December 2003, by his cousin Carlos Bustelo, politician during the Spanish transition, and journalist Justino Sinova, who insisted for years on him publishing his memoirs.

About its contents, Javier Pradera appoints that "this book basically gathers family memories framed in Ribadeo and in Madrid (an orphan since he was seven years old, coming back to the capital city as a teenager he would feel the discomfort of "the soft status of being the poor relative"), student evocations from Cervantes Institute or from the School of Civil Engineering, and professional experience in Renfe, Perlofil and the Unión Española de Explosivos (Spanish Explosives Union). Nevertheless, the partisan struggle, found at the same time as an attraction and as a punishment, is present ubiquitously throughout the whole book; the reason is that "politics forced their way into the Spanish families on the 20th century being cleaved just like an icebreaker".

The relatives he speaks about are: his father, Leopoldo Calvo Sotelo, independent monarchical, his liberal grandfather Ramón Sotelo, his conservative uncle José Calvo Sotelo, his great uncle Adolfo Vázquez, founder of the first Masonic lodge in Uruguay, his uncles Francisco Bustelo, an engineer, and Joaquín Calvo Sotelo, playwright, his father-in-law José Ibáñez Martín, ministry during Franco's government and his brother-in-law Fernando Morán, a socialist politician.

Leopoldo Calvo-Sotelo also describes his relationship with figures of the Spanish political scene such as Juan de Borbón, Federico Silva, Alfonso Osorio and Gonzalo Fernández de la Mora.

To write about it, Leopoldo Calvo-Sotelo consulted several files and researched in the National Library of Spain, as explained by Paloma Fernández Palomeque, who had been his librarian and archivist, and as explained by the author himself.

Professor Bernabé Sarabia considers that "the human character emerging from these pages is educated, with a huge sense of humour and very combative. The doubt that remains in the reader is what prevails in Calvo Sotelo, his intelligence or his memory, both capacities of which he could boast."

Ignacio Sotelo claims about this book and about Living memory of the Spanish transition that "Leopoldo Calvo Sotelo, after briefly going through the presidency of the Government –he would have been a magnificent president, if 23-F had not lifted him up and Suárez had not deposed him, after decisively contributing to the dissolution of UCD–, has published very deserving essay books, in which a half Galician, half British humour is highlighted, that constitute some pieces of these incomplete memoirs."

The book has 255 pages of text and 48 more gathering 51 photographs, where those of family character prevail. Three editions were made in the years 2003 and 2004.

On the ensemble of the work, Justino Sinova believes the following: "Leopoldo Calvo-Sotelo was a really good writer. This is something anyone can tell really easily if he approaches one of his three published books. Open any of them at any page, read a few lines and you will see how good the style is, how high the quality is. When I say he was a good writer I do not only refer to the reflection of his wide culture in his texts but I especially refer to the precision of his language, the rhythm of the construction, his sense of humour turned into irony so many times, even to the acid irony, and the amenity of his story."
