= Fernando Álvarez de Miranda =

Spanish politician, lawyer and university professor (1924–2016)

Fernando Álvarez de Miranda y Torres
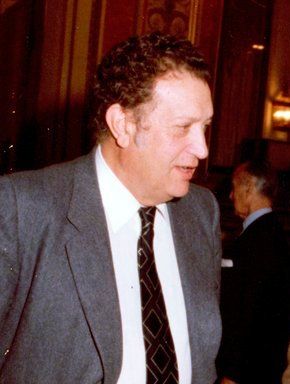
- Fernando Álvarez de Miranda in 1982.

President of the Congress of Deputies
- In office 13 July 1977 – 22 March 1979
- Monarch: Juan Carlos I
- Preceded by: Torcuato Fernández-Miranda as President of Cortes Españolas
- Succeeded by: Landelino Lavilla Alsina

Member of the Congress of Deputies
- In office 5 July 1977 – 18 November 1982
- Constituency: Palencia

Ombudsman of Spain
- In office 30 November 1994 – 30 November 1999

Personal details
- Born: Fernando Álvarez de Miranda y Torres; 14 January 1924 Santander, Cantabria, Spain
- Died: 7 May 2016 (aged 92) Madrid, Spain
- Party: UCD

Fernando Álvarez de Miranda y Torres (14 January 1924 – 7 May 2016) was a Spanish politician, lawyer, and university professor of Procedural Law. He was president of the Congress of Deputies from 1977 to 1979, the first after Spain's transition to democracy. From 1994 to 1999 he was Ombudsman of Spain.

== Biography ==
Álvarez de Miranda studied law at the University of Madrid, where he later taught procedural law. Of Christian democratic and monarchist ideology, he was deported to Fuerteventura by the Francoist government for assisting to the 4th Congress of the European Movement International, celebrated in Munich in 1962. He was a member of Juan de Borbón's privy council.

=== Political career ===
During the Spanish Transition, Álvarez de Miranda founded the Christian Democratic Left, a split of the Democratic Left. The party joined several other Christian democratic parties to form the Christian Democrat Party, which was itself eventually integrated into the Union of the Democratic Centre. Álvarez de Miranda was elected to the Congress of Deputies after the 1977 Spanish general election and was President of the Congress during the Constituent Legislature. He was also ambassador of Spain to El Salvador from 1986 to 1989 and Defender of the People (Ombudsman) of Spain from 1994 to 1999.
