= Nemesio Fernández-Cuesta =

Spanish businessman, journalist and politician (1928–2009)

Minister of Commerce
- In office 4 January 1974 – 5 March 1975
- Prime Minister: Arias Navarro
- Preceded by: Agustín Cotorruelo
- Succeeded by: José Luis Cerón Ayuso

Personal details
- Born: Nemesio Fernández-Cuesta e Illana; 24 May 1928 Madrid, Spain
- Died: 12 May 2009 (aged 80) Madrid, Spain
- Party: Independent
- Spouse: María Victoria Luca de Tena
- Children: 10

Nemesio Fernández-Cuesta (1928–2009) was a Spanish economist, businessman, journalist and politician. He was the minister of commerce between 1974 and 1975 during the Franco era.

== Early life and education ==
Fernández-Cuesta was born in Madrid on 24 May 1928. His parents were Nemesio Fernández-Cuesta, a soldier and journalist, and María Teresa Illana. At the age of four he contracted polio and as a consequence his right arm was left useless for life. His father fought under General Franco as commander of the Moroccan Flag. His paternal uncle, Manuel Fernández-Cuesta, was the founder of the sports newspaper Marca.

Nemesio Fernández-Cuesta received a degree in law and economics.

== Career ==
Nemesio Fernández-Cuesta started his career at the Banco Exterior de España. He published articles in the economy section of ABC between 1963 and 1969. He served as the undersecretary of commerce in 1969 and deputy governor of the Bank of Spain in 1973. Fernández-Cuesta was appointed deputy minister of commerce, and while he was in office he visited Cuba with the Foreign Minister Gregorio López-Bravo. Fernández-Cuesta was appointed minister of commerce to the cabinet led by Prime Minister Carlos Arias Navarro in January 1974. He was in office until 5 March 1975. During the period of transition, he regularly published articles in ABC and was the chief executive officer of its publisher, Prensa Española, between October 1975 and March 1976.

Fernández-Cuesta was the president of Petronor between March 1976 and 1981. He became director of the financial section of the Banco Exterior de España and president of the insurance company Hércules Hispano in 1981. He was part of the campaign for the presidential candidacy of Real Madrid CF led by Ramón Mendoza in 1994. Fernández-Cuesta was appointed Real Madrid's vice president for social affairs in February 1995. He resigned from the post November 1995.

== Personal life and death ==
Nemesio Fernández-Cuesta married María Victoria Luca de Tena, daughter of Juan Ignacio, Marquis of Luca de Tena. They had ten children. He died in Madrid on 12 May 2009. A funeral ceremony was held in Madrid on 18 May, and he was buried there.

=== Awards ===
Fernández-Cuesta was the recipient of the Order of Charles III, Order of Civil Merit and Order of Isabella the Catholic.
