= Enrique Fontana Codina =

Spanish politician (1921–1989)

Minister of Trade of Spain
- In office 30 October 1969 – 9 June 1973
- Prime Minister: Francisco Franco
- Preceded by: Faustino García-Moncó
- Succeeded by: Agustín Cotorruelo

Personal details
- Born: Enrique Fontana Codina; 17 October 1921 Reus, Kingdom of Spain
- Died: 25 June 1989 (aged 67) Madrid, Spain
- Party: FET y de las JONS

Enrique Fontana Codina (17 October 1921 – 25 June 1989) was a Spanish politician who served as Minister of Trade of Spain between 1969 and 1973, during the Francoist dictatorship. He was a member of FET y de las JONS.
