= Eduardo Carriles =

Spanish lawyer, businessman and politician (1923–2020)

Minister of Finance
- In office 7 July 1976 – 4 July 1977
- Prime Minister: Adolfo Suárez

Personal details
- Born: 28 November 1923 Santander, Spain
- Died: 12 January 2020 (aged 96) Madrid, Spain
- Party: Unión Democrática Española
- Spouse: Carola Díaz de Bustamante (m. 1950)
- Children: 8

Eduardo Carriles (1923–2020) was a Spanish lawyer, businessman and politician who served as the minister of finance between 1976 and 1977.

== Biography ==
Carriles was born in Santander on 28 November 1923. He was a lawyer by profession. He served as the general secretary of a company, Aeronáutica Industrial, and director of various other companies. Carriles was part of the reformist Tácito group, but he left the group with others to establish the Unión Democrática Española.

Carriles was part of the Unión when he was appointed minister of finance to the cabinet led by Adolfo Suárez on 7 July 1976. In the cabinet Carriles and other ministers, including Leopoldo Calvo Sotelo, Andrés Reguera, Landelino Lavilla, Enrique de la Mata, Marcelino Oreja and Alfonso Osorio, were called Tácito group due to their previous involvement in the movement. Like previous finance ministers Carriles could not manage to reduce economic crisis experienced in Spain in the period 1973–1977. His term as minister of finance ended on 4 July 1977.

Carriles married Carola Díaz de Bustamante in 1950, and they had eight children. He was the recipient of Knight Grand Cross of the Order of Charles III. He died on 12 January 2020. The funeral was held in the Church of San Francisco de Borja, Madrid, on 6 February.
