= Faustino García-Moncó =

Spanish politician (1916–1996)

Minister of Trade of Spain
- In office 8 July 1965 – 30 October 1969
- Prime Minister: Francisco Franco
- Preceded by: Alberto Ullastres
- Succeeded by: Enrique Fontana Codina

Personal details
- Born: Faustino García-Moncó y Fernández; 13 October 1916 Santander, Kingdom of Spain
- Died: 6 June 1996 (aged 79) Madrid, Spain
- Party: Opus Dei (National Movement)

Faustino García-Moncó y Fernández (13 October 1916 – 6 June 1996) was a Spanish politician who served as Minister of Trade of Spain between 1965 and 1969, during the Francoist dictatorship. He was a member of the Opus Dei.
