= Guillermo Luca de Tena =

Spanish journalist

Guillermo Luca de Tena y Brunet, 1st Marquis del Valle de Tena, Grandee of Spain (born Madrid, June 8, 1927 - died there April 6, 2010) was a Spanish journalist. Honorary president of Grupo Vocento and former president of Prensa Española, he was editor of the daily newspaper ABC. He was the son of Juan Ignacio Luca de Tena, and nephew of Torcuato Luca de Tena y Álvarez Ossorio. He spent much of his life in Madrid, with his wife, Soledad García-Conde Tartiere, and had two daughters.
