= Enrique García-Ramal =

Minister of Trade Union Relations of Spain
- In office 12 June 1973 – 4 January 1974
- Prime Minister: Luis Carrero Blanco
- Preceded by: Himself
- Succeeded by: Alejandro Fernández Sordo

Minister without portfolio National Delegate for Trade Unions
- In office 30 October 1969 – 12 June 1973
- Prime Minister: Francisco Franco
- Succeeded by: Himself

Personal details
- Born: Enrique García-Ramal Cerralbo; 27 July 1914 Barcelona, Kingdom of Spain
- Died: 30 November 1987 (aged 73) Madrid, Spain
- Party: FET y de las JONS

Enrique García-Ramal Cellalbo (27 July 1914 – 30 November 1987) was a Spanish politician who served as a minister without portfolio between 1969 and 1973, during the Francoist dictatorship.
