= Luis Ortiz González =

Spanish politician (1932–2006)

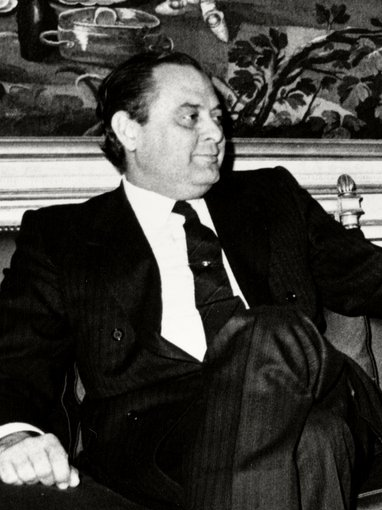
Luis Ortiz González

Luis Ortiz González (Madrid, 1932 – 2 February 2006) was a Spanish politician and former Minister of Public Works in the Governments of Adolfo Suarez.

After receiving a degree in law, he became a member of the state body of technical inspectors and later became financial director of the state run Spanish railway company Renfe. In December 1975 he was named Under-Secretary for Commerce and in 1976, Under-Secretary for Public Works, holding that post until 1977 when he resigned in order to seek a nomination for the Spanish Congress of Deputies for the 1977 General Election, the first democratic Spanish election in over 40 years. He withdrew his candidature at the request of Adolfo Suarez, the Prime Minister of Spain, who appointed him Minister for Public Works on 15 April 1977, succeeding Leopoldo Calvo Sotelo. However he was replaced in a reshuffle in July 1977. On 14 June 1978 he was elected President of the Union of the Democratic Centre (Spain) (UCD) for Madrid region but resigned in 1979 after failing to win a nomination to stand in the 1979 General Election. When Calvo Sotelo replaced Suarez as Prime Minister, Ortiz was reappointed Minister of Public Works and Urbanism on 27 February 1981 serving until 2 December 1982.

He finally realised his parliamentary ambitions in the October 1982 General Election when he was elected MP as part of the UCD list, representing Zamora Province. When the UCD disbanded in February 1983, he joined the Democratic and Social Centre (CDS) becoming parliamentary spokesman for the CDS group. He then left the CDS to join the Democratic Popular Party (PDP) and was re-elected in the 1986 General Election for the Popular Coalition, an electoral alliance between the PDP, the Liberal Party and the Popular Alliance (AP). In 1989, the three parties merged to form the current People's Party and in that year Ortiz transferred to the Spanish Senate where he served one term. He returned to the lower chamber, the Spanish Congress at the 1993 General Election and was re-elected in 1996 and 2000 representing Zamora.
