= Carmen Fraga Estévez =

Spanish politician

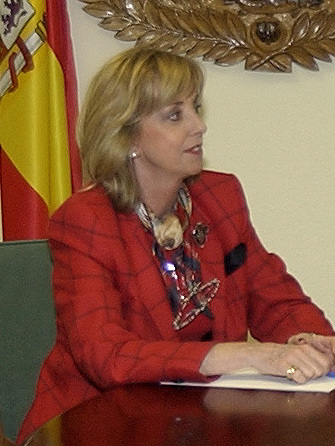
- Fraga Estévez in 2004

Member of the European Parliament for Spain
- In office 1994 – 1 July 2014

Personal details
- Born: 19 October 1948 (age 77) León, Spain
- Party: People's Party
- Parent: Manuel Fraga

Carmen Fraga Estévez (born 19 October 1948) is a Spanish politician from the People's Party who served as a Member of the European Parliament from 1994 until 2014. She is a member of the Bureau of the European People's Party.

== Early life and education ==
Fraga Estévez was born to Carmen Estévez Eguiagaray and politician Manuel Fraga. She graduated in 1970 with a degree in humanities, specialising in geography, and graduated law school in 1985.

== Career ==
Fraga Estévez has been the Official in Ministry of Public Works since 1970. From 1986 to 1994, she was an EPP group official, and she was a member of the European Parliament from 1994 to 2002. During her time in parliament, Fraga Estévez served on the Committee on Agriculture and Rural Development and the Committee on Fisheries. In addition to her committee assignments, she was also a member of the Delegation for relations with the Maghreb countries and the Arab Maghreb Union (including Libya). She was at one point first vice-chairwoman of the EPP-Ed group. From 1997 to 1999, she served as chairwoman of the Committee on Fisheries, and she was the Secretary-General for Maritime Fisheries from 2002 to 2004.

== See also ==
- 2004 European Parliament election in Spain
