= Agustín Cotorruelo =

Spanish politician (1925–1989)

Minister of Trade of Spain
- In office 12 June 1973 – 4 January 1974
- Prime Minister: Francisco Franco
- Preceded by: Enrique Fontana Codina
- Succeeded by: Nemesio Fernández-Cuesta

Personal details
- Born: Agustín Cotorruelo Sendagorta; 13 July 1925 Plencia, Biscay, Spain
- Died: 6 February 1989 (aged 63) Madrid, Spain
- Party: Nonpartisan (National Movement)

Agustín Cotorruelo Sendagorta (13 July 1925 – 6 February 1989) was a Spanish politician who served as Minister of Trade of Spain between 1973 and 1974, during the Francoist dictatorship.
