= Andrés Reguera =

Spanish politician (1930–1970)

Minister of Information and Tourism
- In office 8 July 1976 – 5 July 1977
- Prime Minister: Adolfo Suarez
- Preceded by: Adolfo Martín-Gamero
- Succeeded by: Office abolished

Personal details
- Born: Andrés Reguera Guajardo; 16 November 1930 Segovia
- Died: 6 June 2000 (aged 69) Madrid
- Resting place: Segovia
- Party: Unión Democrática Española
- Spouse: María Aránzazu Errasti Laveate
- Parents: Germán Reguera Antón (father); Pilar Guajardo Miñón (mother)
- Education: Universidad Complutense de Madrid

Andrés Reguera (16 November 1930 – 6 June 2000) was a Spanish jurist, businessman and politician who served at the Spanish Parliament. He was the minister of information and tourism between 7 July 1976 and 4 July 1977.

== Early life and education ==
Reguera was born in Segovia on 16 November 1930. His parents were Germán Reguera Antón and Pilar Guajardo Miñón.

He was a graduate of the Complutense University of Madrid, where he received a degree in law in 1952.

== Career ==
Reguera was an assistant professor at his alma mater in 1957. He worked as a lawyer in Vizcaya from 1961 to 1965 and as legal advisor at the Ministry of Public Works from 1965 to 1968. He also served as the counselor of the Renfe-Operadora, a state-owned railway company, and of the Banco de Crédito Local. He was elected as a deputy in 1967 and served in the IX Legislature until 1971 representing the province of Segovia. He was re-elected for the X legislature in October 1971, and his term at the parliament ended in 1977. He was the secretary general of the Catholic Association of Propagandists and part of the Unión Democrática Española, a right-wing Christian democratic political party.

On 7 July 1976 Reguera was named as the minister of information and tourism and served in the first government of Adolfo Suárez. He was part of the Tacito group in the cabinet along with Eduardo Carriles, Leopoldo Calvo-Sotelo, Landelino Lavilla, Enrique de la Mata, Marcelino Oreja and Alfonso Osorio. Reguera reduced censorship activities which would be finalized by the Ministry of Culture in 1977. He was in office until 4 July 1977. Following his retirement from politics he involved in business and was the vice president of Atlético Madrid.

== Personal life and death ==
Reguera married María Aránzazu Errasti Laveate on 16 September 1962. They had five children. He died in Madrid on 6 June 2000 and buried in his hometown, Segovia.

=== Awards ===
Reguera received the Grand Cross of the Order of Civil Merit in 1969 and Grand Cross of the Order of Carlos III in 1977.
