= Fernando González Laxe =

Spanish politician

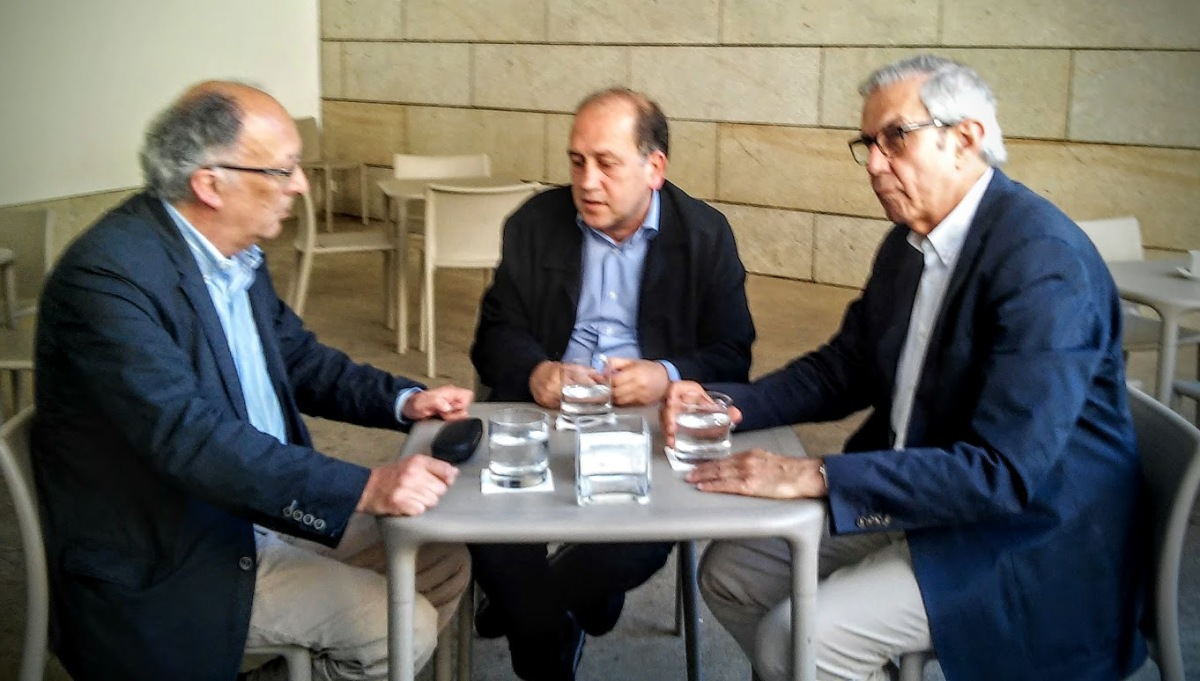
- Laxe (left) in 2016

4th President of the Regional Government of Galicia
- In office 26 September 1987 – 5 February 1990
- Monarch: Juan Carlos I
- Deputy: Xosé Luis Barreiro (1987–88); Javier Suárez Vence (1988–90)
- Preceded by: Xerardo Fernández Albor
- Succeeded by: Manuel Fraga

Personal details
- Born: Fernando Ignacio González Laxe; 6 September 1952 (age 74) A Coruña, Spain
- Party: Socialists' Party of Galicia

Fernando Ignacio González Laxe (born 6 September 1952) is a Spanish politician who was President of the Regional Government of Galicia from 1987 to 1990.

== Biography ==
González Laxe has a Bachelor of Economics and Doctor of Economic and Business Science. He began his professional career in 1975 as a professor of Economic Structure at a university college in La Coruña. After passing through the Socialist Party of Galego (PSG), in 1977 he joined the Socialist Party of Galicia-PSOE (PSdeG-PSOE), beginning his political career a year later, as secretary of the preautonomic Board, where he was subsequently deputy director General Fisheries (1979-1980).

González Laxe was candidate to the Congress of the Deputies in the constituent elections 1977 and to the Senate in the general elections of 1979, without obtaining bench in any of the two elections. He finally acceded to the Senate, as senator appointed by the autonomous community of Galicia in 1986.

After the socialist triumph in the general elections of 1982, he was appointed General Director of Fisheries Management of the Ministry of Agriculture, Fisheries and Food, as well as Spanish representative at the FAO World Conference on Fisheries, and at the II Latin American Fisheries Congress . From his position in the ministry he was responsible for the fisheries negotiations of Spain with the European Economic Community.

In November 1985 he was the candidate of PSdeG-PSOE to the presidency of the Xunta de Galicia. The elections were won by the Popular Coalition, which allowed the popular Gerardo Fernández Albor to form a government. In 1987 González Laxe presented a motion of censure against the government of Fernández Albor with the support of the Galician Coalition and the Galician Nationalist Party. The motion triumphed and González Laxe formed a tripartite coalition government (September 28, 1987). In 1988 he held the presidency of PSdeG-PSOE. Candidate for re-election in 1989, he obtained an act of regional deputy, with the best results of the PSdeG-PSOE in the history of Galicia (28 seats), which ultimately proved insufficient, as the victory by absolute majority of Manuel Fraga prevented him revalidate the presidency, which he held until February 2, 1990.

In 2000 he resigned his seat in the Senate and in 2001 he stopped being a deputy in the Parliament of Galicia, not returning to occupy positions of political relevance. Away from the first political line, he is currently a professor of Applied Economics at the University of A Coruña.

In April 2009, he was named president of the Public Organism Puertos del Estado, position in which he ceased in January 2012.

He is a knight of the Order of Isabel the Catholic and has the Gold Medal of the city of A Coruña and the Gold Medal of Galicia, the latter shared with Gerardo Fernández Albor, Manuel Fraga and Emilio Pérez Touriño.

== Works ==
He has published several works on the fishing theme:

- Problems of Galician coastal fishing.
- Capitalist development and fishing crisis.
- Ribeira, its people, its economy.
- The economy of the fishing sector.
