= Juan Ignacio Luca de Tena, 2nd Marquis of Luca de Tena =

Spanish politician and journalist (1897–1975)

Excelentísimo Señor Don Juan Ignacio Luca de Tena OIC
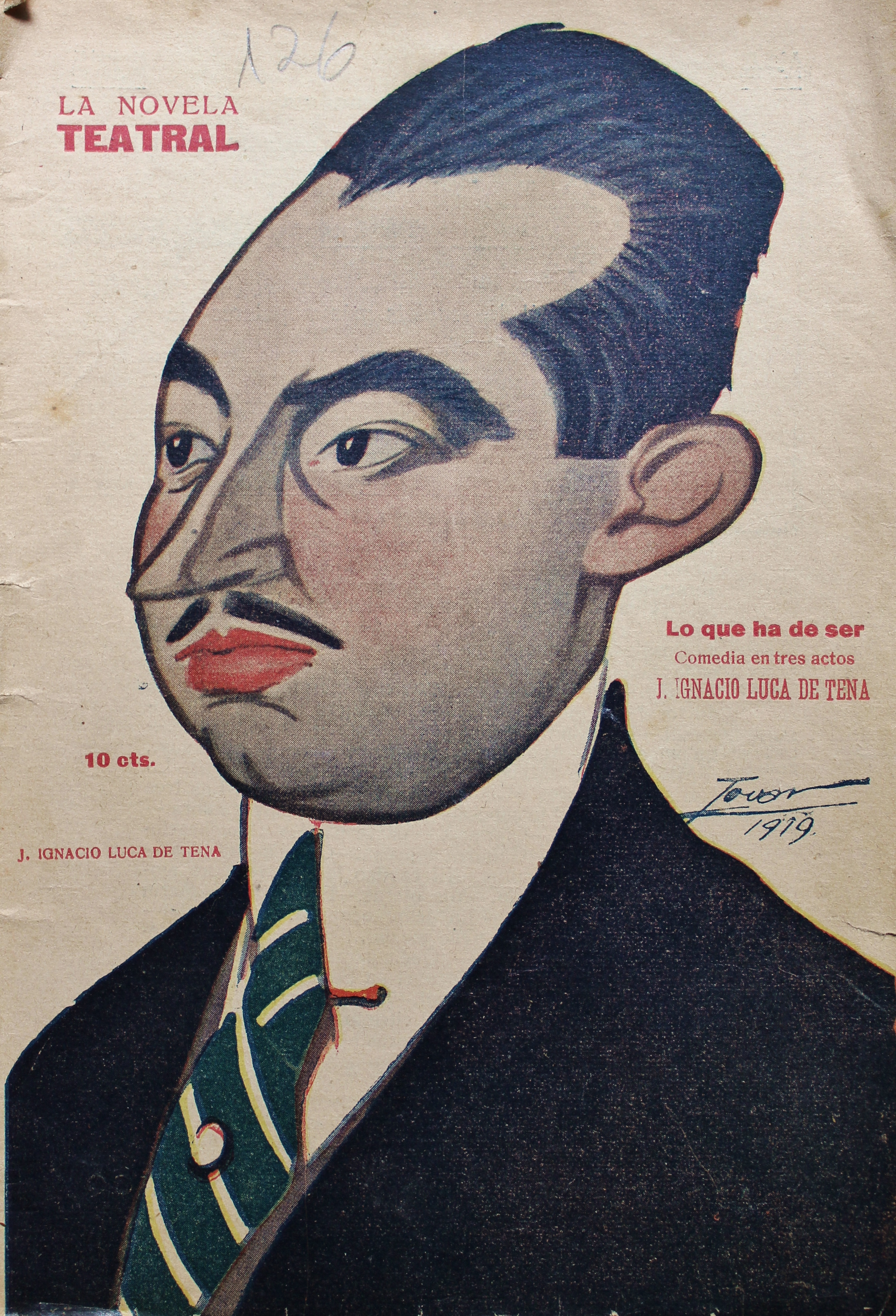
- Caricatured by Tovar (La Novela Teatral, 1919)
- Born: Juan Ignacio Luca de Tena y García de Torres; 23 October 1897; Madrid, Spain
- Died: 11 January 1975 (aged 77); Madrid, Spain

Seat E of the Real Academia Española
- In office 20 January 1946 – 11 January 1975
- Preceded by: Joaquín Álvarez Quintero
- Succeeded by: Gonzalo Torrente Ballester

Juan Ignacio Luca de Tena y García de Torres, 2nd Marquis of Luca de Tena (Madrid, 23 October 1897 – 11 January 1975) was a Spanish politician, diplomat, journalist and playwright.

== Career ==
Luca de Tena was a Member of the Cortes (1958–64) and Ambassador of Spain to Chile (1940–44) and to Greece (1961–62).

Luca de Tena was elected to seat E of the Real Academia Española. He took up his seat on 20 January 1946.

== Personal life ==
His son was the journalist Guillermo Luca de Tena. His daughter, María Victoria Luca de Tena, was married to Nemesio Fernández-Cuesta, a businessman and journalist.

He died at his home at in Madrid on the morning of January 11, 1975.

== Awards and decorations ==
- Cross of Military Merit
- Campaign medal for the Civil War
- Order of Merit of the German Eagle
- Grand Cross of the Order of Merit (Chile)
- Grand Cross of the Order of Juan Pablo Duarte (Dominican Republic)
- Order of the Medahuia (Morocco)
