= José Luis Cerón Ayuso =

Spanish politician (1924–2009)

Minister of Trade of Spain
- In office 5 March 1975 – 12 December 1975
- Prime Minister: Carlos Arias Navarro
- Preceded by: Nemesio Fernández-Cuesta
- Succeeded by: Leopoldo Calvo-Sotelo

Personal details
- Born: José Luis Cerón Ayuso; 13 November 1924 Madrid, Spain
- Died: 7 June 2009 (aged 84) Madrid, Spain
- Party: Nonpartisan (National Movement)

José Luis Cerón Ayuso (13 November 1924 – 7 June 2009) was a Spanish politician who served as Minister of Trade of Spain in 1975, during the Francoist dictatorship.
