= Spanish National Union =

Spanish National Union Unión Nacional Española
- Abbreviation: UNE
- President: Gonzalo Fernández de la Mora
- Secretary-General: Miguel Fagoaga
- Founded: 1975
- Dissolved: 1979
- Merged into: Spanish Democratic Right
- Headquarters: Madrid, Spain
- Ideology: National conservatism Traditionalism; Post-Francoism; Spanish nationalism Opposition to the Spanish Constitution of 1978
- Political position: Right-wing to far-right
- National affiliation: People's Alliance (1976-1978)

The Spanish National Union (Spanish: Unión Nacional Española, UNE) was a conservative and traditionalist political party in Spain.

== History ==
The UNE was born in 1975 as a "political association". Among its leaders there were members and ex-members of the Carlist movement that recognized Juan Carlos I as prince and successor to Francisco Franco, and as the future king of Spain. Among them Antonio María de Oriol, Juan María de Araluce Villar, José Luis Zamanillo and José María Valiente Soriano. Its president was the former Francisco Franco minister Gonzalo Fernández de la Mora and one of its vicepresidents the diplomat José María Velo de Antelo.

In November 1977, following a tumultuous assembly, José María Velo de Antelo and José Luis Zamanillo led a split because of the permanence of UNE in People's Alliance (AP), to which the party belonged since its establishment in 1976. The UNE, led by Gonzalo Fernández de la Mora and Miguel Fagoaga, as secretary general, left AP in November 1978 for its support of the Spanish Constitution of 1978. In 1979 UNE and Spanish Democratic Action (ADE) formed a new coalition, the Spanish Democratic Right (DDE). UNE dissolved shortly after the creation of the new coalition.
