= Fernando de Liñán =

Former Minister of Information and Tourism of Spain

Minister of Information and Tourism of Spain
- In office 12 June 1973 – 4 January 1974
- Prime Minister: Luis Carrero Blanco
- Preceded by: Alfredo Sánchez Bella
- Succeeded by: Pío Cabanillas Gallas

Personal details
- Born: Fernando de Liñán y Zofio; 19 April 1930 Madrid, Kingdom of Spain
- Died: 27 April 2011 (aged 81) Madrid, Spain
- Party: FET y de las JONS

Fernando de Liñán y Zofio (19 April 1930 – 27 April 2011) was a Spanish politician who served as Minister of Information and Tourism of Spain between 1973 and 1974, during the Francoist dictatorship. He was a member of FET y de las JONS.
