= Christian Democratic Party (Spain) =

Political party in Spain (1977–1978)

Christian Democratic Party Partido Demócrata Cristiano
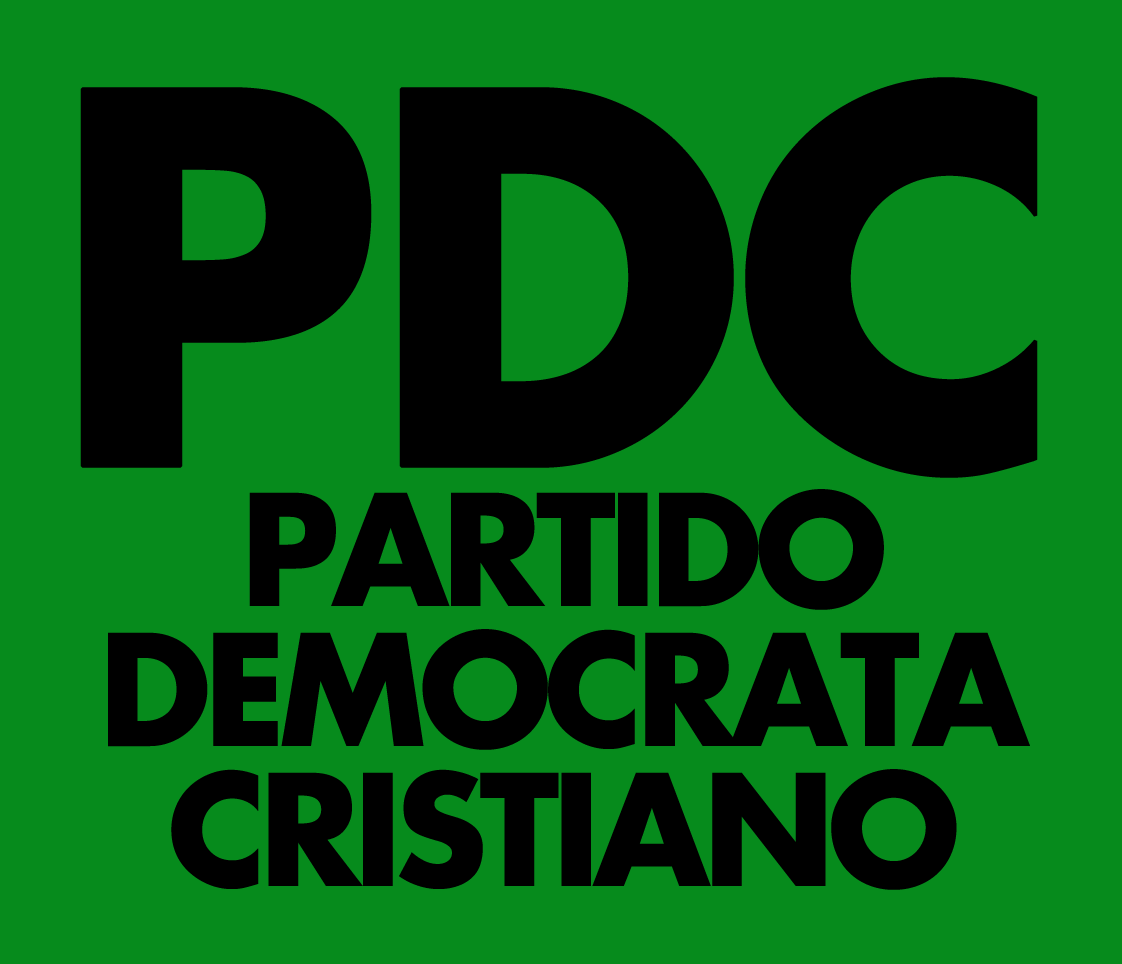
- President: Íñigo Cavero
- Secretary-General: Fernando Álvarez de Miranda
- Founded: 4 April 1977
- Dissolved: 7 February 1978
- Merger of: Spanish Democratic Union; Christian Democratic People's Party
- Merged into: Union of the Democratic Centre
- Headquarters: Agustín de Foxá, 27-1, Madrid
- Ideology: Christian democracy
- Political position: Centre to centre-right
- National affiliation: UCD
- Colours: Green
- Slogan: El Centro que levantó Europa

The Christian Democratic Party (Spanish: Partido Demócrata Cristiano; PDC) was a Spanish Christian democratic political party, founded in 1977. The leaders of the PDC were Fernando Álvarez de Miranda and Íñigo Cavero.

== History ==
The party was founded through the merge of the Spanish Democratic Union (UDE) and the Christian Democratic People's Party (PPDC), along with some independents. The party joined the Union of the Democratic Centre (UCD) electoral coalition for the 1977 Spanish general election, gaining 17 seats in the Congress of Deputies, officially merging into the UCD as a unitary party in December 1977 and dissolving itself in February 1978.
