= Leopoldo Calvo-Sotelo =

Prime Minister of Spain from 1981 to 1982

The Most Excellent Leopoldo Calvo-Sotelo 1st Marquess of Ría de Ribadeo GE
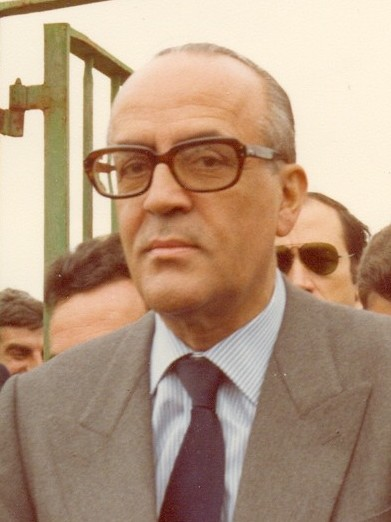
- Calvo-Sotelo in 1976

Prime Minister of Spain
- In office 26 February 1981 – 2 December 1982
- Monarch: Juan Carlos I
- Deputy: Rodolfo Martín Villa; Juan Antonio García Díez
- Preceded by: Adolfo Suárez
- Succeeded by: Felipe González

Second Deputy Prime Minister of Spain
- In office 9 September 1980 – 25 February 1981
- Prime Minister: Adolfo Suárez
- Preceded by: Fernando Abril Martorell
- Succeeded by: Juan Antonio García Díez

Minister of Economy
- In office 9 September 1980 – 25 February 1981
- Prime Minister: Adolfo Suárez
- Preceded by: Fernando Abril Martorell
- Succeeded by: José Luis Leal Maldonado

Minister for Relations with the European Communities
- In office 25 February 1978 – 9 September 1980
- Prime Minister: Adolfo Suárez
- Preceded by: Office created
- Succeeded by: Eduard Punset

Minister of Public Works
- In office 4 July 1976 – April 1977
- Prime Minister: Adolfo Suárez
- Preceded by: Antonio Valdés
- Succeeded by: Luis Ortiz González

Minister of Trade
- In office 13 December 1975 – 6 July 1976
- Prime Minister: Carlos Arias Navarro
- Preceded by: José Luis Cerón Ayuso
- Succeeded by: José Lladó

Member of the Congress of Deputies
- In office 22 July 1977 – 31 August 1982
- Constituency: Madrid
- In office 28 July 1983 – 23 April 1986
- Constituency: Madrid

Personal details
- Born: Leopoldo Ramón Pedro Calvo-Sotelo y Bustelo; 14 April 1926 Madrid, Spain
- Died: 3 May 2008 (aged 82) Pozuelo de Alarcón, Spain
- Resting place: Ribadeo Cemetery, Galicia, Spain
- Party: Union of the Democratic Centre (1977–1983)
- Spouse: María del Pilar Ibáñez-Martín Mellado
- Children: 8

Leopoldo Ramón Pedro Calvo-Sotelo y Bustelo, 1st Marquess of Ría de Ribadeo (Spanish pronunciation: [leoˈpoldo ˈkalβosoˈteloj βusˈtelo]; 14 April 1926 – 3 May 2008), was a Spanish civil engineer and politician who was Prime Minister of Spain from 1981 to 1982.

== Early life and career ==
Calvo-Sotelo was born into a prominent political family in Madrid on 14 April 1926 with his father, Leopoldo Calvo Sotelo, and his mother, Mercedes Bustelo Márquez. The assassination of his uncle, José Calvo Sotelo, who had been finance minister under Miguel Primo de Rivera, was a key event leading up to the Spanish Civil War. Calvo-Sotelo graduated as a civil engineer from the School of Civil Engineers of Madrid now part of the Technical University of Madrid, working in the area of applications of chemistry to the industry.

He was the president of Renfe (the Spanish national railroad network) between 1967 and 1968. Calvo-Sotelo was elected solicitor (Deputy) of Franco's Cortes, representing industrialists in the Union of Chemical Industries, in 1971. A monarchist, Sotelo was one of the founders of an association of politicians, mostly of Rightists and Center Rightists, which disguised as the Fedisa publishing firm helped Spain's peaceful transition into democracy.

== Political career ==
Calvo-Sotelo was designated Minister of Commerce by Carlos Arias Navarro to be in the first government of the Monarchy (December 1975 – July 1976). He advocated a true transition to democracy instead of mere superficial changes that politicians like Navarro planned. Calvo-Sotelo was kept in the cabinet of Adolfo Suárez upon his succession to premiership in 1976 and directed several centre-right and centre-left political associations into one party, the Union of the Democratic Centre (UCD). Calvo-Sotelo was part of the Tacito group in the cabinet along with Eduardo Carriles, Andrés Reguera, Landelino Lavilla, Enrique de la Mata, Marcelino Oreja and Alfonso Osorio. The UCD won in both the June 1977 and the March 1979 elections and Calvo-Sotelo was elected MP for Madrid.

== President of the Government of Spain ==
Suárez decided to keep him in the Cabinet, first from 1978 to 1980 as Minister for Relations of the European Economic Community, then as Second Vicepresident in charge of economic affairs. After the resignation of Suárez on 29 January 1981, he was supposed to be appointed Prime Minister (Presidente del Gobierno) on 23 February, and advocated Spain's proposed entry into NATO as soon as possible. However, on that date a session of the Congress of Deputies was interrupted by the attempted coup of 23-F. After the failed coup, his appointment as Prime Minister was confirmed on 25 February by the vote of all the UCD members of the congress and 21 others as well, giving him a majority of 186 to 158. Unlike his predecessors, Sotelo was more inclined to reverse Spain's historically hostile stance towards Israel. However, his foreign minister José Pedro Pérez-Llorca would prevent Sotelo's government from recognizing Israel, citing fears of an Arab oil embargo.

Splits in the UCD group led to the formation of three rival parties, the Democratic Action Party (Partido de Acción Democrática/PAD), which soon merged with the Spanish Socialist Workers' Party (PSOE), the Democratic and Social Centre (CDS) and Democratic Popular Party (PDP), resulting in the UCD being unable to count on sufficient support in the legislature. Fresh elections were called, resulting in a heavy defeat for the UCD, which won only 12 seats at the 1982 election compared to 168 in 1979. He served as Prime Minister until 1 December 1982 and was succeeded by the socialist Felipe González.

== Later years ==
In 2002, Calvo-Sotelo was raised into the Spanish nobility by King Juan Carlos of Spain and given the hereditary title of Marqués de la Ría de Ribadeo (Marquess of Ría de Ribadeo), together with the dignity Grande de España (English: Grandee of Spain), this in honour for his service.

Calvo-Sotelo was also a member of the Club of Madrid and of the Spanish Royal Academy of Engineering.

He wrote several political autobiographical books: Memoria viva de la transición (Living memory of the Spanish transition), Papeles de un cesante (Papers from an unemployed person), and Pláticas de familia (1878–2003) (Family talks (1878-2003)).

He died of natural causes at his home in Pozuelo de Alarcón, on 3 May 2008 aged 82.

== Personal life ==
He was married to María del Pilar Ibáñez-Martín y Mellado and had eight children:

- Leopoldo Calvo-Sotelo e Ibáñez-Martín (born 4 September 1957), 2nd Marquess of Ría de Ribadeo, married to Cristina Egea y Gutiérrez-Cortines.
- Juan Calvo-Sotelo e Ibáñez-Martín (born 14 November 1958), married to Lucía Fernández y Cartuxo
- María del Pilar Calvo-Sotelo e Ibáñez-Martín (born 20 October 1959), married to Carlos Delclaux y Zulueta
- Pedro Calvo-Sotelo e Ibáñez-Martín (born 20 December 1960), married to María Alvarez-Cascos y Gómez de Arteche
- Víctor Calvo-Sotelo e Ibáñez-Martín (born 24 November 1961), unmarried and without issue
- José María Calvo-Sotelo e Ibáñez-Martín (born 2 May 1964), unmarried and without issue
- Andrés Calvo-Sotelo e Ibáñez-Martín (born 14 August 1965), twin with the below, unmarried and without issue
- Pablo Calvo-Sotelo e Ibáñez-Martín (born 14 August 1965), twin with the above, married to Elvira García-Bellido y Capdevilla

== General references ==
- Mclean, Renwick (2006). "Spain Takes a Proud Look Back." International Herald Tribune. 24 February.
- Preston, Paul (1990). The Triumph of Democracy in Spain. London: Routledge.
- Rogers, Eamonn and Valerie Rogers, eds. (1999). Encyclopedia of Contemporary Spanish Culture. London: Routledge.
- Walker, Jane (2006). "The Day Freedom Was Put in Peril." The Irish Times. 23 February.

Political offices
Preceded by José Luis Cerón Ayuso	Minister of Commerce; 1975–1976	Succeeded by José Lladó Fernández-Urrutia
Preceded by Antonio Valdés González-Roldán	Minister of Public Works; 1976–1977	Succeeded by Luis Ortiz González
Preceded by Office created	Minister for Relations with the European Communities; 1978–1980	Succeeded by Eduardo Punset
Preceded by Fernando Abril Martorell	Second Deputy Prime Minister of Spain; 1980–1981	Succeeded by Juan Antonio García Díez
Preceded by Fernando Abril Martorell	Minister of Economy; 1980–1981	Succeeded by José Luis Leal Maldonado
Preceded by Adolfo Suárez	Prime Minister of Spain; 1981–1982	Succeeded by Felipe González
Party political offices
Preceded by Office created	Secretary-General of the Union of the Democratic Centre; 1977-1978	Succeeded by Rafael Arias-Salgado
Preceded by Office created	Leader of the Centrist Group in the Congress of Deputies; 1977–1978	Succeeded by Antonio Jiménez Blanco
Preceded by Agustín Rodríguez Sahagún	President of the Union of the Democratic Centre; 1981–1982	Succeeded by Landelino Lavilla
Spanish nobility
New creation	Marquess of Ría de Ribadeo; 2002–2008	Succeeded by Leopoldo Calvo-Sotelo e Ibáñez-Martín
