= Mario Villarroel =

Venezuelan lawyer

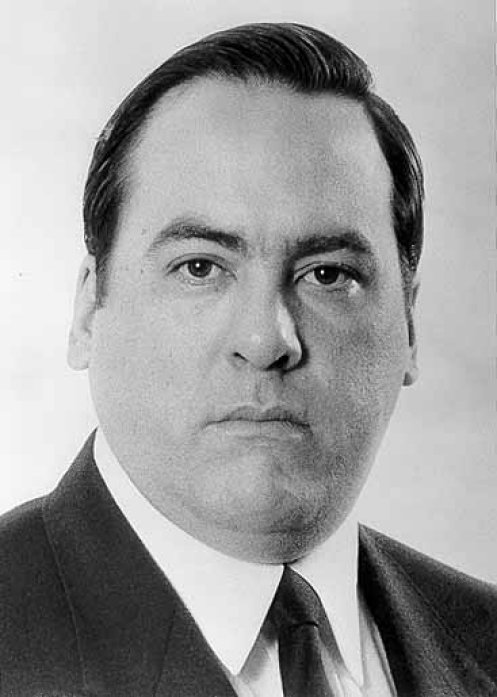
- Mario Villarroel Lander

President of the International League/Federation of Red Cross and Red Crescent Societies
- In office 1987–1997
- Preceded by: Enrique de la Mata
- Succeeded by: Astrid Nøklebye Heiberg

Personal details
- Born: 21 September 1947 (age 78) Caracas, Venezuela
- Spouse: Norka Sierralta
- Children: Morris Villaroel Sierralta, Marrión Villaroel Sierralta (Marion Troitino) y Mario Villaroel Sierralta

Mario Enrique Villarroel Lander (born 21 September 1947) is a Venezuelan lawyer.

== Career ==
After studying jurisprudence at the Central University of Venezuela, he graduated as LL. D. in criminology. He is currently the professor for criminal law at the Universidad Santa María in Caracas and president of the Venezuelan Red Cross Society. In 1987, he succeeded Enrique de la Mata Gorostizaga as President of the International League of Red Cross and Red Crescent Societies from 1987 to 1997. During his tenure, in November 1991, it was renamed the International Federation of Red Cross and Red Crescent Societies. He also functioned occasionally as the president of the Centre for Humanitarian Dialogue in Geneva.

He was president of the Venezuelan Red Cross Society until August 2023, when he was removed from his post amidst a scandal after being denounced by “several other members of his team for harassment and mistreatment of volunteers and paid staff.”

== Controversies ==
Along with his children, Morris Villaroel Sierralta and Marion Troitino (born Marión Villarroel Sierraalta), he has been accused of involvement in the disappearance of his client, César Augusto de Caro Marino, who has been missing since 2008 after inheriting $9 million. The accusation is related to the emptying of his bank accounts following this event.

In 2025, he was accused of being linked, along with his son and in collusion with Supreme Court Justice Calixto Ortega, to bribing voters to secure recognition of Nicolás Maduro's disputed victory in the 2024 Venezuelan presidential elections.

That same year, a group of people affected by his judicial decisions requested an investigation into several companies registered in his and his wife Norka Sierralta's names for the alleged purchase of five properties, valued at $4 million, with funds obtained through corruption.

Non-profit organization positions
Preceded by Enrique de la Mata	President of the International League/Federation of Red Cross and Red Crescent Societies; 1987–1997	Succeeded by Astrid Nøklebye Heiberg
