= Papers from an Unemployed Person =

1999 book by Leopoldo Calvo-Sotelo

Papers from an unemployed person (Spanish: Papeles de un cesante) is the second book published by Leopoldo Calvo-Sotelo and it was released on 1999, published by Galaxia Gutenberg, and it was subtitled "Politics from the barrier", nine years after the first one, Living memory of the Spanish transition.

Ex-President Adolfo Suárez presented it in Madrid on Thursday, 8 April of that same year. At that moment, Suárez said that ""Papers from an unemployed person" portrays and transmits the personality of the author: profound, educated, sensitive and elegant. Calvo-Sotelo is one of the few learned politicians in Spain. He could be considered an updated Floridablanca or Campomanes".

"It has been fifteen years since I started having a job as unemployed, a new one (among many others) in the new parliamentary monarchy", writes Leopoldo Calvo-Sotelo in the prologue titled "Fallen tree leaves", being 73 years old.

This book, which is 317 pages long, gathers texts from conferences, prologues, speeches, interventions in seminars and texts written during those years, which are grouped in four sections: Europe, Spain, People and Others.

Francisco Rubio Llorente, former president of the Council of State, commented on the works of Leopoldo Calvo-Sotelo: "He was a man with a powerful intelligence and a formidable capacity for expression, both written and oral. He strived, as he told us, to make his notes and speeches always have sobriety and economy, like the algebraic developments. And as a result of such determination, his texts are always precise and elegant, and very far from the syntactically tormented diffuse verbiage that is so common in our public life".

Topics like the European Union, NATO, 23 F, terrorism of ETA, the Spanish Constitution or the José Ortega y Gasset Foundation, from which he had been president, are addressed. He also writes about figures like Adolfo Suárez, José María de Areilza, Juan Antonio García Díez, Mingote, Xavier Zubiri, Valery Giscard d’Estaing or François Mitterrand.

"From this autobiographically tailored volume it could be said that it is well articulated, seriously documented and that it has an appreciable political cleanse", says Professor Bernabé Sarabia.

According to journalist and professor Justino Sinova: "The texts, although with a very wide range of topics, keep their unity in the characteristics of Calvo-Sotelo’s rhetoric and in the intelligent observation and the irony that so many times feels tempted to end as a satire."

Professor Ignacio Sánchez Cámara thought, "If the style is a reflection of the man, the excellent prose of the illustrious "unemployed" announces the disposition of its author: intelligent, ironic, some times distant, with a reasonably complaining attitude towards the treatment occasionally received, and critical but never scathing. Disposition and style that configured the way to be a politician for UCD, which would have been centrist, as the author says, if it had never got to be a political party. While the politician is unemployed, the intellectual personality speaks. While it could be doubted that the citizen will win, it will be sure that the reader will".
