= Antonio Valdés González-Roldán =

Spanish politician (1926–2007)

Minister of Public Works of Spain
- In office 4 January 1974 – 5 July 1976
- Prime Minister: Carlos Arias Navarro
- Preceded by: Gonzalo Fernández de la Mora
- Succeeded by: Leopoldo Calvo-Sotelo

Personal details
- Born: Antonio Valdés González-Roldán; 23 May 1926 Madrid, Kingdom of Spain
- Died: 10 October 2007 (aged 81) Madrid, Spain
- Party: Nonpartisan (National Movement)

Antonio Valdés González-Roldán (23 May 1926 – 10 October 2007) was a Spanish politician who served as Minister of Public Works of Spain between 1974 and 1976, during the Francoist dictatorship.
