= Tordesilos =

Tordelrábano, Spain
- Coat of arms

- Location within Province of Guadalajara Location within Castilla-La Mancha Location within Spain
- Coordinates: 41°13′11″N 2°45′24″W
- Country: Spain
- Autonomous community: Castile-La Mancha
- Province: Guadalajara
- Municipality: Tordelrábano

Area
  - Total: 11.62 km^{2} (4.49 sq mi)
- Elevation: 1,070 m (3,510 ft)

Population (2025-01-01)
  - Total: 78
  - Density: 6.7/km^{2} (17/sq mi)
- Time zone: UTC+1 (CET)
  - Summer (DST): UTC+2 (CEST)

Tordelrábano is a municipality located in the province of Guadalajara, Castile-La Mancha, Spain. According to the 2004 census (INE), the municipality had a population of 11 inhabitants.
