= Antonio Hernández Mancha =

Spanish politician

MP Antonio Hernández Mancha

Leader of the Opposition
- In office 8 February 1987 – 20 January 1989
- Prime Minister: Felipe González
- Preceded by: Miguel Herrero y Rodríguez de Miñón
- Succeeded by: José María Aznar

Senator appointed by Parliament of Andalusia
- In office 20 July 1986 – 2 September 1989

Personal details
- Born: 1 April 1951 (age 75) Guareña, Badajoz, Spain
- Party: People's Alliance
- Profession: Lawyer

Antonio Hernández Mancha (born 1 April 1951 in Guareña, Badajoz) is a former Spanish politician and president of the People's Alliance political party from 1987 to 1989. He is married and has two children.

== Political career ==
Hernández Mancha was elected regional president of People's Alliance in Andalucía (1980–87). In 1986, Manuel Fraga was removed for having attained his "electoral ceiling." The party conducted internal elections in which Hernández Mancha defeated Miguel Herrero y Rodríguez Miñón.

Hernández Mancha presented a motion of no confidence against Felipe González in order to be known by the population, but the motion was rejected as the Socialists held an absolute majority and his candidacy was therefore defeated. In 1989, he resigned from the post.

After leaving politics, Hernández Mancha worked as a lawyer and businessman.

== Other activities ==
- Enagás, Independent Member of the Board of Directors (2014–2022)
