= Gonzalo Fernández de la Mora =

Spanish essayist and politician

Minister of Public Works of Spain
- In office 14 April 1970 – 4 January 1974
- Prime Minister: Francisco Franco; Luis Carrero Blanco
- Preceded by: Federico Silva Muñoz
- Succeeded by: Antonio Valdés González-Roldán

Personal details
- Born: Gonzalo Fernández de la Mora y Mon; 30 April 1924 Barcelona, Spain
- Died: 10 February 2002 (aged 77) Madrid, Spain
- Party: Spanish National Union

Gonzalo Fernández de la Mora y Mon (Barcelona, 1924 – Madrid, 2002) was a Spanish essayist and politician who represented Pontevedra in Congress for the Popular Alliance from 1977 to 1979. He was married to Isabel Valera Una, and had four children with her: Isabel, Gonzalo, Juan Luis and Sandra.

== Biography ==
When he was two years old, his family moved to Madrid, and Gonzalo Fernandez de la Mora later began studying for his Baccalaureate at Colegio de Pilar. He lived in Galicia for a short period of time (in Mondariz, Guitiriz and Vigo). The civil war broke out in Galicia while he was on holiday so he was forced to stay there and complete his Baccalaureate with the Jesuits of the Colegio de Santiago Apostol. His father was a colonel in the judicial army under Alfonso XIII. His mother, of royal heritage, was descended from a minister of Isabel II. Back in Madrid, in 1940, he began to study Law & Philosophy, focussing on pure philosophy. In September 1943, he earned his PhD in Law. At the age of 19, he had already had a book published: Paradoja, which praised Azorin, a fellow Spanish writer.

In 1946, he joined the Spanish Diplomatic School, which he would later become Head of, where he came into contact with various liberal monarchist groups. During his youth, Gonzalo Fernandez de la Mora came into contact with many different people, such as Fernando Alvarez de Miranda, Joaquin Calvo Sotelo, Íñigo Cavero, Torcuato Luca de Tena, Juan Jose Lopez and Jose de Yanguas Messia. As a diplomat, he occupied the positions of Spanish consul in Frankfurt (1949), person in charge of negotiations in Bonn (1949–51) and cultural advisor in Athens (1961–62). From 1970 to 1974 he was Minister of Public Works. In 1974 was appointed as director of the Spanish Diplomatic School.

Fernandez de la Mora was awarded Extraordinary Prizes in the state exam and in his law degree, in addition to graduating in Pure Philosophy; he graduated from the University of Madrid. He was also visiting professor and librarian of the Royal Academy of Moral and Political Sciences, and a member of various world universities: Geneva, New York, Argentina, Venezuela and Chile.
