= Ministry of Information and Tourism =

- Ministerio de Información y Turismo

Agency overview
- Formed: 20 July 1951
- Dissolved: 5 July 1977
- Superseding agency: Office of the Spokesperson Ministry of Culture Ministry of Trade
- Type: Ministry
- Jurisdiction: Government of Spain

The Ministry of Information and Tourism (Spanish: Ministerio de Información y Turismo) was a ministerial department of the Government of Spain created in 1951 during the dictatorship of Francisco Franco to control information and the censorship of press and radio. The ministry also assumed the management of Tourism, an important industry at that time when it had an important flowering. In historiography, some authors consider it as a simple Ministry of Propaganda.

== History ==
=== Background ===
The need to inform public opinion of the government's action had its beginnings in 1918 with the creation of the Ministry of Public Instruction and Fine Arts that had an Information Office. With the dictatorship of Primo de Rivera, two successive organizations were created; first the Bureau for Information and Press Censorship, during the Military Directory (1923), and the next one in the Civil Directory (1925) with the Cabinet for Information and Press Censorship. During the Second Republic, a Press Section was created in the General Secretariat of the President of the Republic (1932) and already during the Civil War, prime minister Largo Caballero created the Ministry of Propaganda that had an ephemeral life.

=== Department ===
The Department of Information and Tourism was created by a Decree-Law of 19 July 1951. The ministry assumed the competences over media and entertainment (press, cinematography and theater and broadcasting) that until then were attributed to the Undersecretariat of Popular Education, whose head was Manuel Arburúa de la Miyar, while those of tourism had been attributed to the Directorate-General for Tourism, whose director-general had been, since its creation in 1938 and for fifteen years, Luis Bolín and that until then depended on the Ministry of Home Affairs. Another of the bodies that came to depend on the ministry was the National Delegation of Press, Propaganda and Radio, a body that was in charge of the media controlled by the Falange (such as the Movement Press Group or the Network of Broadcasters of the Movement).

The ministry was abolished during the Spanish transition to democracy, assuming the Office of the Spokesperson the powers relating to information, the Ministry of Culture those about cultural affairs and the Ministry of Trade those of tourism. The tourism powers are currently managed by the Ministry of Industry and Tourism.

== List of ministers ==
Image	Name	Start	End
	Gabriel Arias-Salgado	18 July 1951	10 July 1962
	Manuel Fraga Iribarne	10 July 1962	29 October 1969
	Alfredo Sánchez Bella	29 October 1969	11 June 1973
	Fernando de Liñán y Zofio	11 June 1973	3 January 1974
	Pío Cabanillas Gallas	3 January 1974	24 October 1974
	León Herrera Esteban	29 October 1974	12 December 1975
	Adolfo Martín-Gamero y González-Posada	12 December 1975	5 July 1976
	Andrés Reguera Guajardo	5 July 1976	4 July 1977
