= León Herrera Esteban =

Spanish military officer, jurist and politician (1922–2003)

Minister of Information and Tourism
- In office 19 October 1974 – 12 December 1975
- Prime Minister: Arias Navarro
- Preceded by: Pío Cabanillas Gallas
- Succeeded by: Adolfo Martín Gamero

Personal details
- Born: 4 July 1922 Jaén
- Died: 24 September 2003 (aged 81) Madrid
- Education: University of Granada

León Herrera Esteban (4 July 1922 – 24 September 2003) was a Spanish military officer and politician. He served as the minister of information and tourism in the first cabinet of Carlos Arias Navarro in the period 1974–1975.

== Early life and education ==
Herrera was born in Jaén on 4 July 1922. Following the Civil War he joined the Taxdir cavalry regiment with which he fought on various fronts. He graduated from the University of Granada in 1942 receiving a degree in law.

== Career ==
Herrera joined the Ministry of Air and then, the Ministry of Finance in 1946. His political career began in 1962 when he was appointed director general in the Ministry of Information and Tourism which he held until 1969.

In 1972 Herrera was appointed president of the European Conference of Posts and Telecommunications and was in office until 1974. Next he was named the undersecretary of the Ministry of Interior. He became the minister of information and tourism on 19 October 1974 following the resignation of Pío Cabanillas Gallas. It was Herrera who announced the death of Francisco Franco on 20 November 1975. Herrera's term as the minister of information and tourism ended on 12 December 1975 in a cabinet reshuffle, and he was replaced by Adolfo Martín Gamero in the post.

Next Herrera was appointed government delegate to Telefónica company. In 1983 he was named general legal advisor to the Ministry of Defense. His other positions included the attorney to the Cortes for the province of Jaén, a member of the Royal Academy of Jurisprudence and a member of the Madrid Bar Association.

== Personal life and death ==
Herrera died in Madrid on 24 September 2003.

He was the recipient of the Grand Cross of Naval Merit and the Grand Cross of the Order of Carlos III.
