= Manuel Fraga =

Spanish politician (1922–2012)

The Most Excellent Manuel Fraga
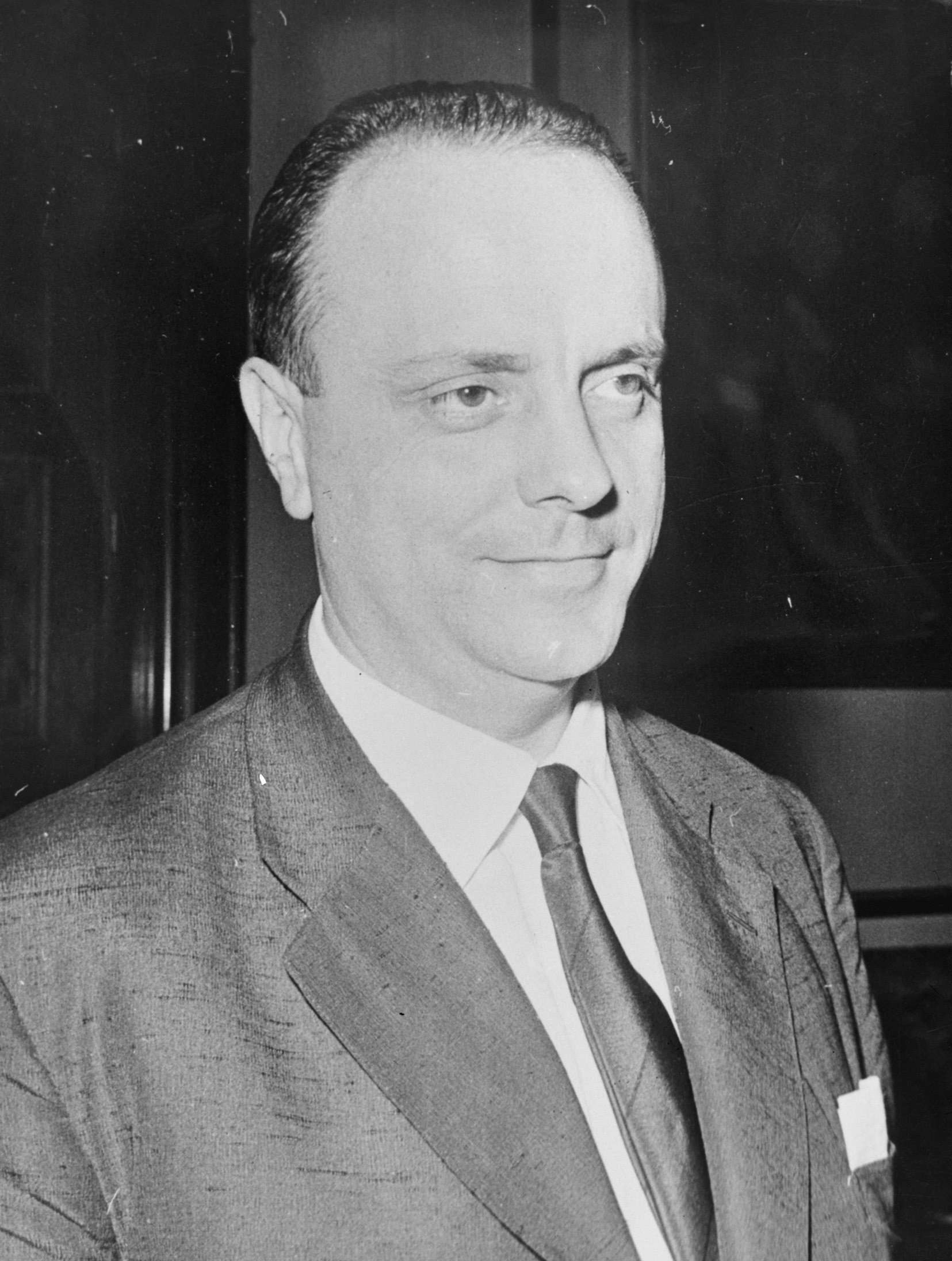
- Fraga in 1963

4th President of the Regional Government of Galicia
- In office 5 February 1990 – 2 August 2005
- Monarch: Juan Carlos I
- Preceded by: Fernando González Laxe
- Succeeded by: Emilio Pérez Touriño

Leader of the Opposition
- In office 28 December 1982 – 1 December 1986
- Monarch: Juan Carlos I
- Prime Minister: Felipe González
- Preceded by: Post established
- Succeeded by: Miguel Herrero de Miñón

Minister of the Interior
- In office 15 December 1975 – 5 July 1976
- Monarch: Juan Carlos I
- Prime Minister: Carlos Arias-Navarro
- Preceded by: Jose Garcia Hernandez
- Succeeded by: Rodolfo Martín Villa

Minister of Information and Tourism
- In office 10 July 1962 – 29 October 1969
- Leader: Francisco Franco
- Preceded by: Gabriel Arias-Salgado
- Succeeded by: Alfredo Sánchez Bella

Member of the Congress of Deputies
- In office 15 June 1977 – 3 July 1987
- Constituency: Madrid

Member of the Senate
- In office 7 February 2006 – 27 September 2011

Member of the Parliament of Galicia
- In office 17 December 1989 – 7 February 2006
- Constituency: Lugo

Personal details
- Born: 23 November 1922 Vilalba, Spain
- Died: 15 January 2012 (aged 89) Madrid, Spain
- Party: People's Party (since 1989); People's Alliance (1976–1989); Democratic Reform (1976–1977); FET y de las JONS (1962–1976)
- Spouse: Carmen Estévez Eguiagaray (m. 1948; d. 1996)
- Children: 5, including Carmen
- Education: University of Santiago de Compostela

Manuel Fraga Iribarne (Spanish pronunciation: [maˈnwel ˈfɾaɣa‿i̯ɾiˈβaɾne]; 23 November 1922 – 15 January 2012) was a Spanish professor and politician during Francoist Spain, and one of the founders of the People's Alliance (Alianza Popular; AP). Fraga was the Minister of Information and Tourism between 1962 and 1969, Ambassador to the United Kingdom between 1973 and 1975, Minister of the Interior in 1975, Second Deputy Prime Minister between 1975 and 1976.

After the fall of the regime, Fraga was one of the Fathers of the Constitution and the President of the People's Alliance/People's Party (PP) between 1979 and 1990. He served as President of Galicia between 1990 and 2005, being a member of the Congress of Deputies and a senator until November 2011. A key political figure in Spain, Fraga was active during both General Francisco Franco's regime and the subsequent transition to representative democracy.

== Early life ==
Manuel Fraga Iribarne was born in Vilalba, Lugo Province, Galicia, on 23 November 1922. Trained in law, economics and political science, he began his political career in 1945, during Francisco Franco's reign.

Fraga married Carmen Estévez Eguiagaray, whom he had met in 1945 in the Faculty of Law, on 17 January 1948. They had 5 children: Carmen, Isabel, José Manuel, Ignacio and Adriana. He also adopted Amalia. Aside from Spanish, Fraga also spoke French, English, Italian, German, Portuguese, Galician and Basque.

== Propaganda Minister ==
Fraga started in the Franco cabinet in 1962 as Minister of Information and tourism. He played a major role in the revitalization of Spanish tourist industry, leading a campaign under the slogan Spain is different!. On 8 March 1966, he attempted to dispel fears of a nuclear accident after the Palomares hydrogen bombs incident by swimming in the contaminated water with the American ambassador, Angier Biddle Duke.

Fraga authorized the execution of political prisoners under the Francoist State. A notable case is the execution of communist leader Julián Grimau, whom he called "that little gentleman" (Spanish: ese caballerete) in a press conference when asked about his detention and death sentence. His death sentence caused a large controversy outside of Spain. Grimau was executed by firing squad in 1963. Fraga never publicly apologized or expressed regret for Grimau's execution.

Another notable case was the assassination by Spanish police of Enrique Ruano, a student activist who opposed the Francoist State. Fraga telephoned Ruano's father and threatened to arrest his other daughter, Margot, who was also an anti-Francoist, unless she immediately stopped her activism. The then-director of Spanish newspaper ABC, Torcuato Luca de Tena, later confessed that Fraga ordered him to publish a manipulated copy of Ruano's personal diary in order to present Ruano as a mentally unstable person who killed himself.

Later in the decade, Fraga established himself as one of the more prominent members of a reformist faction in the government who favoured opening up the government from above. He introduced an a posteriori censorship law, which was based on lifting pre-publication censorship and a reduction in its strictness. Additionally, a certain sexual liberality in films was popularly summarized in the expression Con Fraga hasta la braga ("With Fraga [you can see] even the panties"). His departure from the government was prompted by the MATESA affair: the debt of the important publisher Manuel Salvat Dalmau was tangled with members of the Opus Dei, faction which Fraga opposed. When he published this information, the caudillo Franco expelled both sectors.

== Ambassador to the United Kingdom ==
In 1973, Fraga (according to his memoirs he had been in the shortlist for becoming prime minister along Carrero Blanco and Raimundo Fernández Cuesta), accepted a proposal by Foreign Minister Laureano López Rodó to become Ambassador to the United Kingdom, under the conditions of the stint being no longer than two years, having the ability to appoint a counsellor and a press officer and not being excessively constrained by the Francoist administration. He also wanted to finish a book titled La España de los 70. He served until 1975.

== Minister of the Interior during the Transition ==
Following Franco's death on 20 November 1975, Fraga was appointed deputy prime minister (Vice President of the Government) and Interior Minister (Ministro de Gobernación) on 12 December 1975, under Carlos Arias Navarro, a post he held until 5 July 1976. This was the first government with Juan Carlos I as chief of state.

By this time, Fraga believed Francoism could not be maintained forever. However, while he still favoured liberalization from above, his vision entailed an extremely gradual transition to full democracy. The drastic measures he took as interior minister and head of state security during the first days of the Spanish transition to democracy gave him a reputation for heavy-handedness, and deeply damaged his popularity. The phrase "¡La calle es mía!" ("The streets are mine!") was attributed to him as his answer to complaints of police repression of street protests: he claimed that the streets did not belong to the "people" but to the state. He was known to be an admirer of Antonio Cánovas del Castillo. During a clash at the Church of St. Francis of Assisi in Vitoria (Basque Country) between police and striking workers, on Fraga's orders the police stormed into a packed church into which 4,000 demonstrators had retreated and went on a shooting spree, resulting in five dead and over 100 wounded.

== Leader of People's Alliance ==
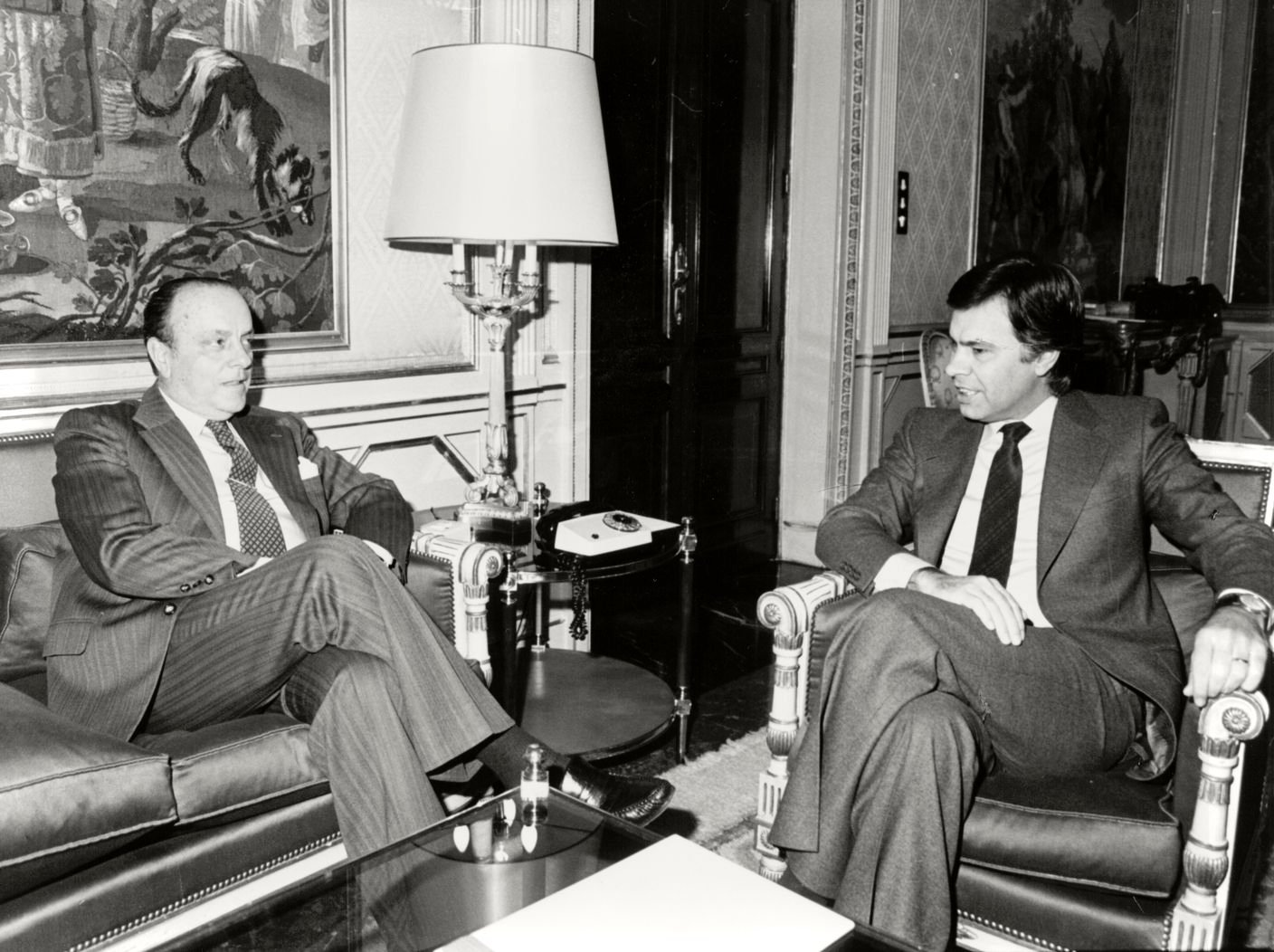
Prime Minister Felipe González holding a meeting with Fraga in La Moncloa in July 1983.

In 1976, Fraga and other former prominent members of the Francoist government founded the People's Alliance (AP), initially a loose confederation of political parties that later became a full-fledged party. Although he tried to brand the party as a mainstream conservative party, the people did not trust him. Besides the large number of former Francoists in the party, Fraga's performance as interior minister gave voters pause. Fraga was one of the writers of the new Spanish constitution approved in 1978 (the "Fathers of the Constitution"). AP fared poorly in its first years, but following the 1982 crisis and the collapse of the Union of the Democratic Centre (UCD), the party that—led by Adolfo Suárez—had won the first two democratic elections, AP became the second biggest group in the Congress of Deputies after the Spanish Socialist Workers Party (PSOE).

Fraga was reckoned as the Leader of the Opposition to the PSOE government. The PSOE enjoyed great popularity and an absolute majority winning streak in the 1982 and 1986 elections, in part because Fraga and the AP were generally viewed as too reactionary to be an alternative. He was subject to a scandal in 1983, when it was reported that Rodolfo Almirón, a former Argentine national police officer leader of the Triple A, a far-right death squad in Argentina, had become chief of his personal security team. (Note: Because of the outcry by Argentinean Justice, Almirón was arrested in 2006 in a subsidized apartment in Torrent (Valencia) and ended his political career.)

== Passing on the torch ==
Following a political crisis in AP in 1986 that saw former Secretary-General Jorge Verstrynge leaving the party and the breaking of the alliance with the Christian-democrats of the People's Democratic Party (PDP) under the People's Coalition (CP), Fraga resigned from the presidency of AP in December 1986. Replaced as party leader by Antonio Hernández Mancha, Fraga ran first in the People's Alliance list for the 1987 European election and was subsequently elected MEP. He served as member of the European Parliament until 1989.

With the AP in headlong decline, Fraga briefly resumed the leadership of the party in 1989. With the addition of several lesser Christian democratic parties and the remnants of the Democratic Center Union, he refounded the People's Alliance as the People's Party (PP). Later in the same year, Fraga encouraged the election of José María Aznar as the party's new president. Fraga was then appointed as honorary president of the PP.

== Regional President of Galicia ==
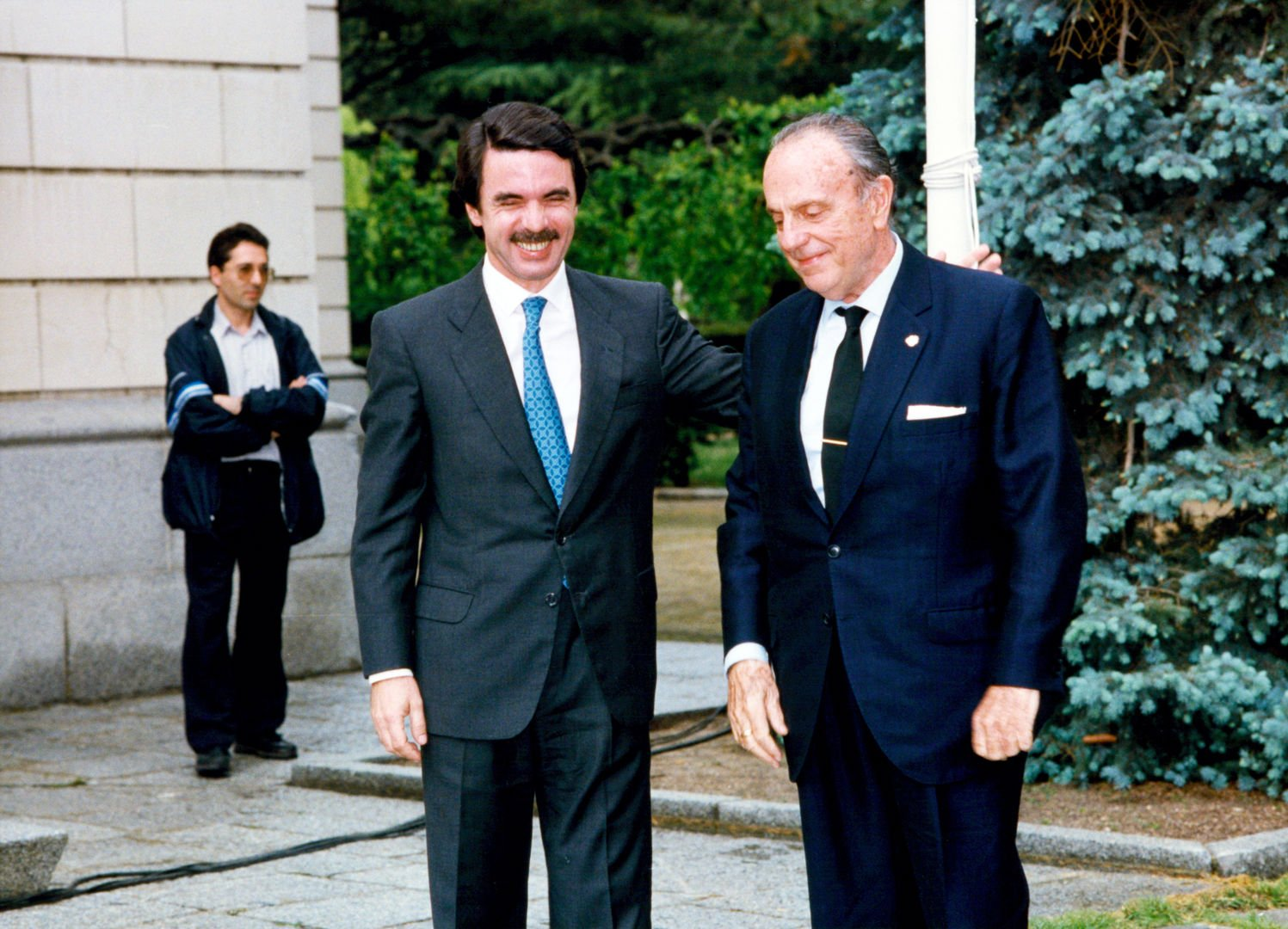
José María Aznar and Fraga in 1996

Manuel Fraga returned to his Galician homeland in 1989, and following the results of the 1989 regional election, with the People's Party in Galicia (PPdG) winning a simple majority in the regional parliament, he became President of the Xunta of Galicia. He remained in charge for almost 15 years until 2005, when the PPdeG lost its overall majority.

Fraga was widowed on 23 February 1996.

Fraga saw his credibility damaged in late 2002, when the oil tanker ship Prestige sank off the Galician coast. It caused a massive oil spill that affected the shoreline in the northwest of the region. Fraga was said to have been slow to react and unable, or unwilling, to handle the situation. In 2004, a power struggle between factions of PPdeG further hurt the party's image.

Subsequently, in the autonomous elections of 2005, Fraga and the PPdeG lost their absolute majority in the Parliament of Galicia. Despite their obtaining a 45% plurality in the elections, a left-government coalition developed between the Socialists' Party of Galicia (PSdeG) and the Galician Nationalist Bloc, making socialist Emilio Pérez Touriño the new president. Fraga remained on the political scene from Galicia, as a member of the Senate representing the Parliament of Galicia. Alberto Núñez Feijóo, a member of the Galician Popular Party, succeeded Fraga as head of the PPdG on 15 January 2006.

== Later life and death ==
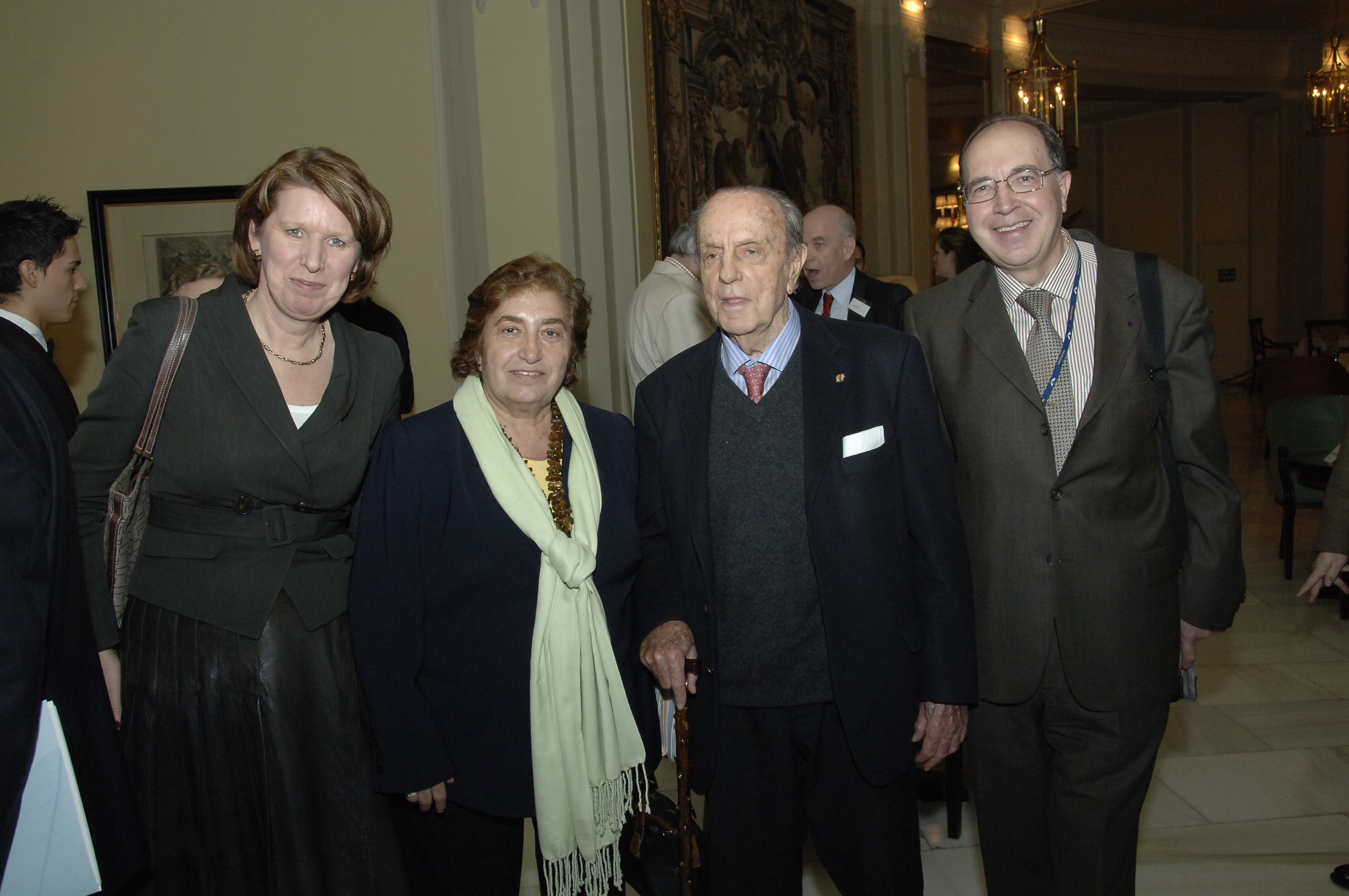
Manuel Fraga (Third from left) on a convention on climate change of the European People's Party in Madrid (2008).

Fraga was designated as member of the Senate by the Parliament of Galicia in 2006. He served in the Upper House until 2011.

Fraga died on 15 January 2012 of a respiratory disease. His funeral was attended by Prince Felipe and Princess Letizia.

== Overview ==
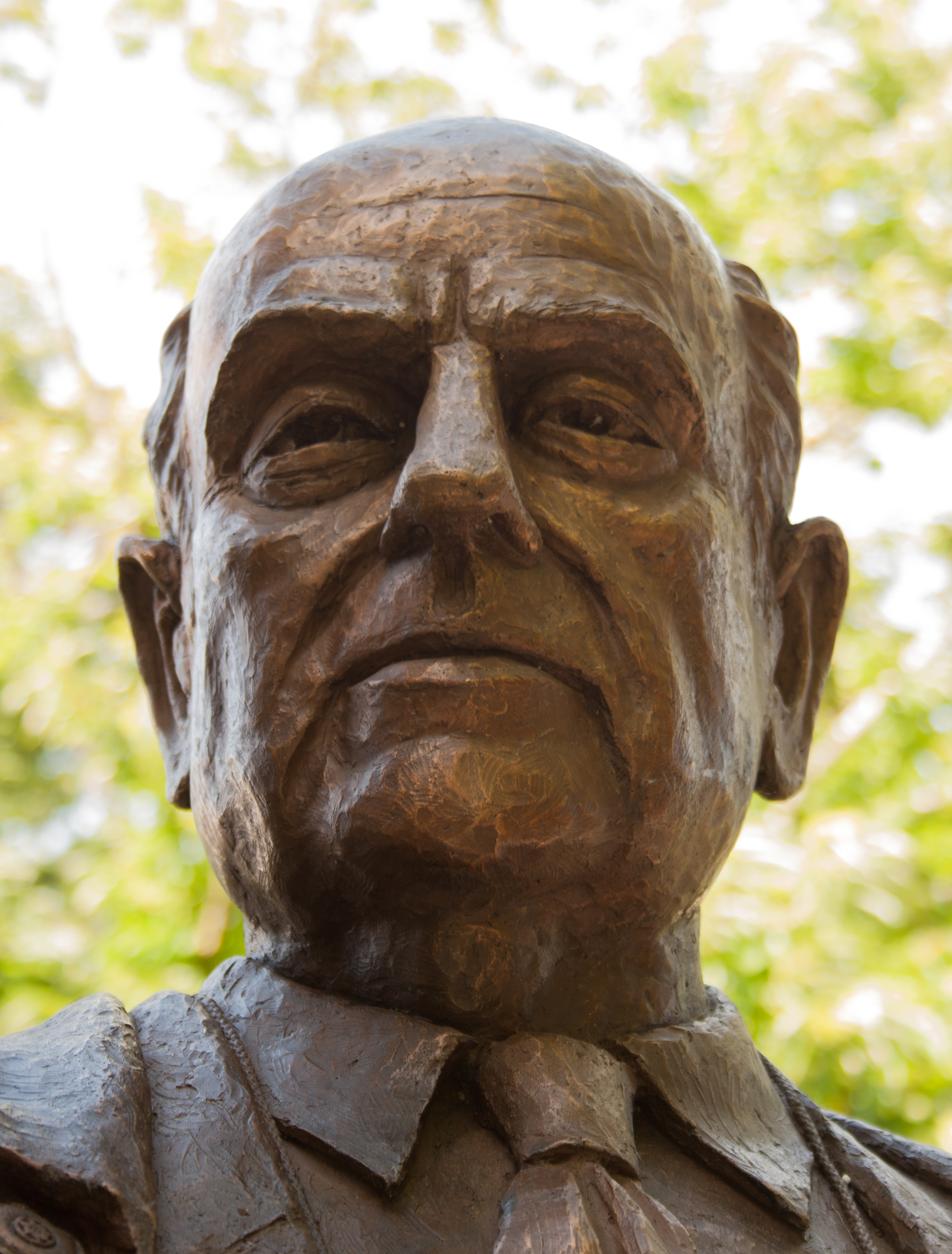
Statue of Fraga in Cambados, Spain.

Fraga was one of the writers of the democratic constitution and spent part of his political career lessening the censorship law during the latter years of the Francoist State. However, he had openly admitted admiration for General Franco and the Francoist State in public on several occasions. He was renowned for his temper tantrums in public at not being referred to or addressed as Don Manuel. He most famously shouted during a television interview, completely unaware the camera was filming and the show was being broadcast live on air. Fraga was probably one of the most important and yet controversial politicians in modern Spain.

To his supporters, Fraga was a Galician hero who throughout his rule, modernised Galicia and built up a fair level of tourism to the region. He built great roads and motorways and in 2000, he approved the Galician Plan to build Spain's first high speed bullet train.

To his opponents he was seen as a dinosaur from the Franco regime. He was a keen follower of Carl Schmitt's ideas, and granted the German political theorist honorary membership to the Institute of Political Studies in 1962, in a ceremony where he praised him as a "revered master". Fraga identified himself with the figure of Antonio Cánovas del Castillo in 1976 for the first time; this idea of identification between Cánovas and Fraga was reinforced by historiographical trends close to Fraga in the 1980s in order to commend his figure. Despite their political differences, he developed a close friendship with Fidel Castro, himself of Galician descent, who met with Fraga in Galicia during a visit to Spain in 1992.

== In popular culture ==
In 1962, a satirical magazine Ley Fraga was launched in Barcelona which was named after him.

== Notes ==
Political offices
Preceded by Gabriel Arias-Salgado	Minister of Information and Tourism; 1962–1969	Succeeded by Alfredo Sánchez Bella
Preceded by Rafael Cabello de Alba	Second Deputy Prime Minister of Spain; 1975–1976	Succeeded by Alfonso Ossorio
Preceded by Jose Garcia Hernandez	Minister of the Interior; 1975–1976	Succeeded by Rodolfo Martín Villa
Preceded by Fernando Ignacio González Laxe	President of the Regional Government of Galicia; 1990–2005	Succeeded by Emilio Pérez Touriño
Party political offices
Preceded by Party Founder	Secretary-General of People's Alliance; 1977–1979	Succeeded by Jorge Verstrynge
Preceded by Office created	Leader of the People's Alliance Group in the Congress of Deputies; 1977–1982	Succeeded by Miguel Herrero y Rodríguez de Miñón
Preceded by Félix Pastor Ridruejo	President of People's Alliance; 1979–1987	Succeeded by Antonio Hernandez Mancha
Preceded by Antonio Hernández Mancha (As President of People's Alliance)	President of the People's Party; 1989–1990	Succeeded by Jose Maria Aznar
Preceded by Gerardo Fernández Albor	President of the People's Party of Galicia; 1988–2006	Succeeded by Alberto Núñez Feijoo
Preceded by Jaime Pita	Leader of the People's Party Group in the Parliament of Galicia; 2005–2006	Succeeded by José Manuel Barreiro
