= Alejandro Fernández Sordo =

Spanish jurist and politician (1921–2009)

Minister of Trade Union Relations
- In office 3 January 1974 – 11 December 1975
- Prime Minister: Carlos Arias Navarro

Personal details
- Born: 4 September 1921 Oviedo, Spain
- Died: 9 May 2009 (aged 87) Madrid, Spain
- Resting place: Madrid
- Party: FET y de las JONS
- Spouse: María de la Concepción Cabal Vega
- Children: 5
- Education: University of Oviedo

Alejandro Fernández Sordo (1921–2009) was a Spanish lawyer and politician who was a member of the FET y de las JONS. He was one of the leading political figures in the Franco regime and also, in the transition period.

== Early life and education ==
Fernández was born in Oviedo, Asturias, on 4 September 1921, but was raised in Llanes. He graduated from the University of Oviedo with a bachelor's degree in law.

== Career ==
Fernández was an academic and worked as a professor of administrative and trade union law at his alma mater. He served as a member of the National Catholic Association of Propagandists. He was the founder of the University Student Union (SEU) in Asturias and worked as a press and propaganda delegate in that union. He also served as the councilor of the Oviedo City Council. He founded the National Union of Press, Radio, Television and Publicity in 1964 and was its first president. On 7 November 1969 he was appointed director general of the press at the Ministry of Information and Tourism and became a member of the Jury of Appeal of Professional Ethics of Journalists the same year. He was made the general secretary of the Trade Union Organization in October 1973.

He served as the minister of trade union relations in the cabinet led by Prime Minister Carlos Arias Navarro between 3 January 1974 and 11 December 1975. In 1976 he was appointed president of the Local Credit Bank and later, was the CEO of a construction company, Huarte.

== Personal life and death ==
Fernández married María de la Concepción Cabal Vega and had five children. He died in Madrid on 6 May 2009 and buried there next day.

=== Honors ===
Fernández was the recipient of the Order of Cisneros, the Order of Civil Merit and the Order of Isabella the Catholic.
