= Manuel Salvat Dalmau =

Spanish publisher

Manuel Salvat
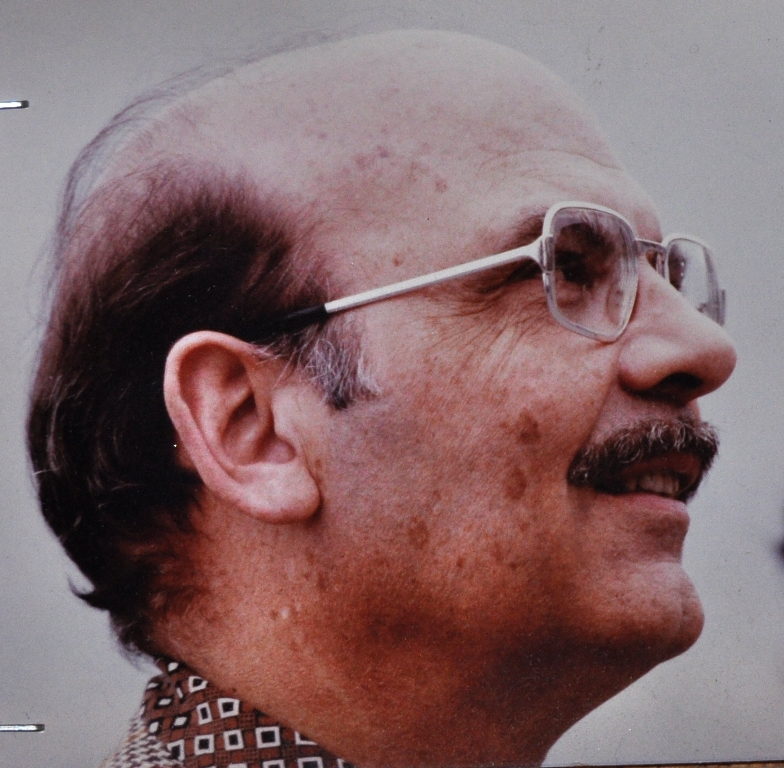
- Manuel Salvat in 1980
- Born: Manuel Salvat Dalmau; October 4, 1925; Barcelona, Catalunya, Spain
- Died: September 11, 2012 (aged 86)
- Occupation: Publisher
- Spouse: Blanca Vilá Reyes
- Parent(s): Santiago Salvat Espasa; Rosa Dalmau Vilá

Manuel Salvat Dalmau (October 4, 1925 in Barcelona, Catalunya – September 11, 2012) was a Spanish publisher. From a family of important publishing tradition, he directed the Editorial Salvat and served as president of the International Publishers Association.

== Private life ==
Son of Santiago Salvat Espasa and Rosa Dalmau Vilá and grandson of Manuel Salvat Xivixell. He studied in the Col·legi Sant Ignasi - Sarrià of Barcelona where he was acknowledged as a brilliant student. Graduated with a degree in Law from the University of Barcelona and a degree in Business Management from IESE Business School. He was married to Blanca Vilá Reyes and had six sons and one daughter. He was also the joint co-founder of the Escuela Patmos of Barcelona in 1958 with five other couples (the Amor Sagués, Tornos, Poblet, Puche, Comas, and Latorre), Priest Joan Alemany i Esteve, and writer and pedagogue Emili Teixidor.

== Professional life ==
=== Editorial Salvat ===
Manuel Salvat Dalmau joined the family business, Salvat Editores S.A. (the publishing company known as Editorial Salvat), in the late 1940s, becoming manager, together with his brothers Santiago and Juan. The company was then leading the Spanish American market in dictionaries and medical works. From that position, it developed an important change in the Spanish publishing sector by intensifying the sales of encyclopedias through instalments. The Salvat Group associated with the Boroli family, owner of De Agostini, which had initiated the sale through fascicles in Italy. For that purpose, they created a new distribution company, Marco Ibérica S.A. (MIDESA), reaching 22 thousand kiosks weekly, resulting in unprecedented success in 1965 with the Enciclopedia Monitor, of which more than 300 thousand complete collections were sold.

Other outstanding achievements while he directed the publishing company were: Félix Rodríguez de la Fuente's Enciclopedia de la Fauna, with over 200 thousand sold copies and the paperback collection RTV, of which the first edition in 1969 sold over a million copies. The Editorial Salvat created over 50 encyclopedias, being also pioneer in incorporating CDs and cassettes in diverse works. In France it obtained a very important market quota. In Latin America it specialized in the sales of encyclopedias with notable success.

Manuel Salvat's trajectory led him to become president of the International Publishers Association (IPA) from 1980 to 1984.

In the late 1980s the Salvat Group was purchased by the French multinational Hachette.

=== Matesa Affair ===
Manuel Salvat Dalmau was the second-most shareholder of one of his family-in-law's companies, Matesa (Maquinaria Textil del Norte de España S.A.). When the scandal broke out in 1969, he was required to pay the guaranteed part of the official export credits that the company had arranged between 1963 and 1969. His brother-in-law and major shareholder (Juan Vilá Reyes) was condemned of swindling as he benefited from loans and export tax exemptions by falsifying sales contracts. The conviction was upheld by the Spanish Supreme Court in 1976. Manuel Salvat had secured these credits without having knowledge of doing so because his brother-in-law had signed them, using his name fraudulently. Even though he was not charged in the Matesa Affair, Manuel Salvat took care of the debt with the Liquidation of Export Credit Commission (Spanish Ministry of Finance,) which allowed him to carry on with his publishing tasks.

== Bibliography ==
- Castellano, Philippe (2010). Dos editores de Barcelona por América Latina. Editorial Iberoamericana, Madrid.
- Castellano, Philippe (2000). La Enciclopedia Espasa. Editorial Espasa, Madrid.
- Cátedra, Pedro y colaboradores (2004). La memoria de los libros: Estudios sobre la historia del escrito y de la lectura en Europa y América. Instituto de Historia del Libro y de la Lectura, Madrid: 679-700.
- Jardí, Enric (1977). 1.000 Familias Catalanas. Editorial Dopesa, Barcelona.
- Ghay, O.P. y Kumar, Narrendra (1984). International Publishing Today. Bookman´s Club.
