= Enrique de la Mata =

Spanish parliamentarian, lawyer and minister

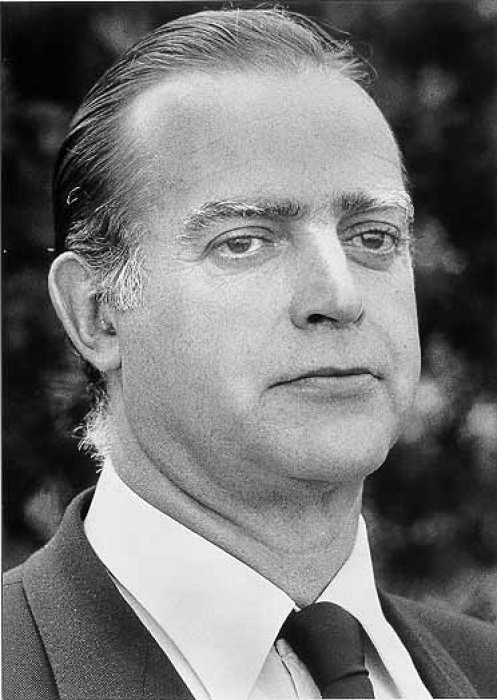
Enrique de la Mata Gorostizaga

Enrique de la Mata (September 20, 1933 – September 6, 1987) was a Spanish parliamentarian, lawyer and minister. He was the President of the International Federation of Red Cross and Red Crescent Societies from 1981 to 1987.

After the end of the Francoist State with Caudillo Franco's death in 1975 and the Spanish transition to democracy, he was Minister for Trade Union Relations from 5 July 1976 to 4 July 1977 in an interim government, officiating up until the first free elections, and in this role contributed to allowing the trade unions back into Spain.

He joined the Union of the Democratic Centre and was elected to the Spanish Congress of Deputies representing Teruel Province at the 1979 General election but lost his seat in the subsequent election in 1982.

Non-profit organization positions
Preceded by Adetunji Adefarasin	President of the International League of Red Cross and Red Crescent Societies; 1981–1987	Succeeded by Mario Enrique; Villarroel Lander
