= José María Moscoso de Altamira Quiroga, 1st Count of Fontao =

Spanish politician

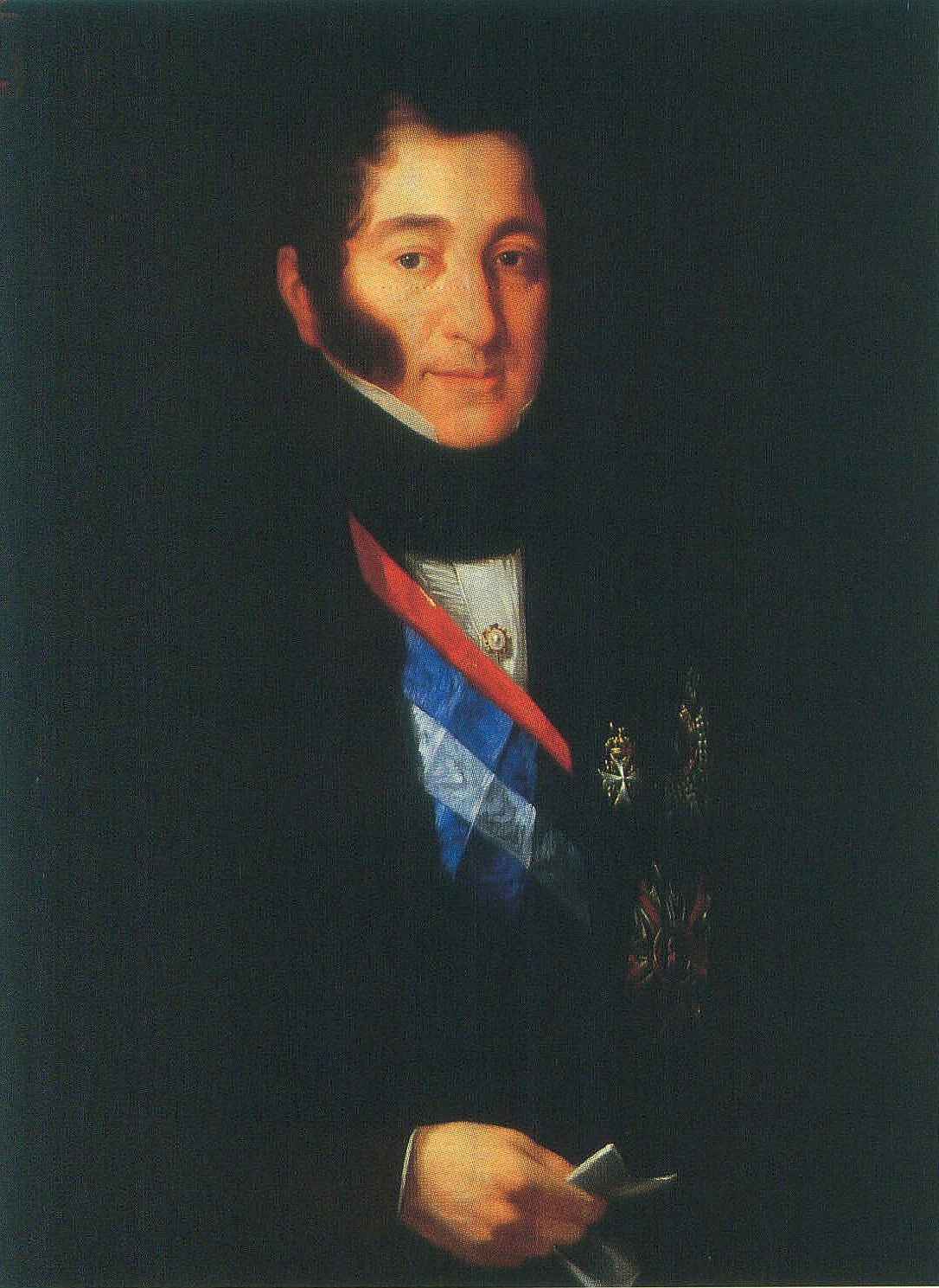
José María Moscoso de Altamira, conde de Fontao, by José María Galván y Candela. (Senate of Spain).

José María Moscoso de Altamira Quiroga, 1st Count of Fontao (Mondonedo, May 25, 1788 – Madrid, March 1, 1854) was a Spanish politician.

== Biography ==
Born José María Moscoso and Quiroga (the "Altamira" would be added later to his name), his father was the Hidalgo Don José María Moscoso y Miranda, VII Señor (Lord) of Fontao, and his mother Doña María del Carmen Quiroga y Quindós, daughter of the Señor de Herves and granddaughter of the III Marquis of San Saturnino.

At the start of the War of Spanish Independence in 1808, he was appointed representative of the nobility of Lugo at the congress of A Coruña gathered due to the French invasion and later commander in the militia of Mondonedo. After the war, he was elected Regidor of that city, and yet during the Trienio Liberal, President of the Parliament on June 1, 1821. He was also elected a deputy for the Kingdom of Galicia in 1820, a feat he would later repeat with Lugo in 1834 and 1837. On February 28, 1822 was appointed Minister of the Interior of the Peninsula at the Government of Francisco Martínez de la Rosa. Moscoso was dismissed after one year. With the restoration of the absolute monarchy in 1823 the king Fernando VII ordered his exile in Lugo. The death of the King and the rise to power of the moderate liberals, their fellow comrades, facilitated his rehabilitation and the Queen Regent Maria Christina of the Two Sicilies appointed him Minister of Fomento General Minister replacing Javier de Burgos. He was dismissed a year after having developed huge road projects in Galicia and Aragon.

When the Senate of Spain was created in 1837 he was elected on November 1 of that year his first term as president and he was equally so in the legislatures of 1838, 1839, 1840, 1844 and 1845.

He was granted with the title of Count of Fontao (after the old Lordship of his family) on January 8, 1840. He was also Knight Grand Cross of the Order of Charles III, Knight Grand Cordon of the Legion of Honor of France, Knight of the Order of Malta, member of the Real Academia de Bellas Artes de San Fernando and Knight of the Real Maestranza of Ronda. Benito Perez Galdos in his novel "The 7th of July" part of the collection of Episodios Nacionales mention the Minister Moscoso calling him "the Apprentice".

== Sources ==
- Burguera, Mónica. Liberalism and the Origins of the Social Women Poverty and the Political Meanings of Philanthropy in Nineteenth century Spain Madrid 1834 1843. University of Michigan, 2008.
- Viveiro Mogo, Prudencio. Política, eleccións e fidalgos: o réxime do Estatuto Real na provincia de Lugo, 1834–1836. Ediciones do Castro. Sada, 2004.

Spanish nobility
Preceded by New creation	Count of Fontao; 1840–1854	Succeeded by Sofía Moscoso
