= Frederic Hauge =

Norwegian environmental activist

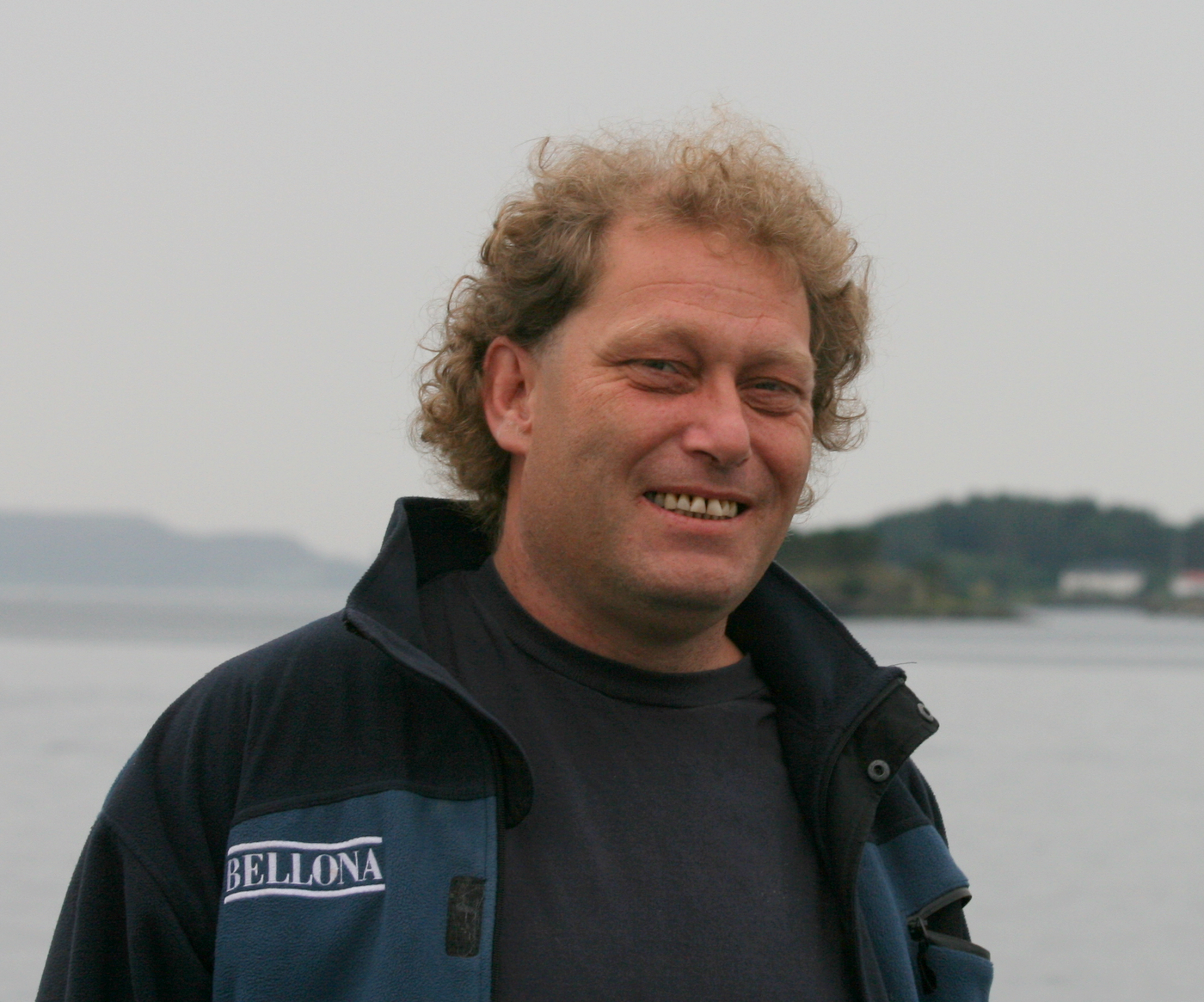
- Frederic Hauge in Stavanger 2008
- Born: 15 August 1965 (age 60); Sandefjord, Norway
- Occupation: Environmental activist
- Known for: Co-founder and head of the Bellona Foundation

Frederic Hauge (born 15 August 1965) is a Norwegian environmental activist. He is head of the Bellona Foundation which he co-founded in 1986. Bellona is an international environmental NGO based in countries such as Russia, the United States, Norway and also the European Union.

== Early activism ==
Born in Sandefjord, Norway, Hauge was active in the environmental organization Natur og Ungdom as a schoolboy, and eventually dropped out of secondary school to concentrate full-time on environmental issues. In 1985 he emerged as leader of a small group of environmental activists who received broad press coverage of their nontraditional methods. Among their focus was pointing out locations where toxic industrial waste had been buried. They also fought against plans for disposal of hazardous waste from titanium mines into Jøssingfjorden. In 1986 he co-founded the Bellona Foundation, which continued the activist style. The early history of Bellona was the subject of a book in 1988, Bellona. Gudinna som ble vaktbikkje, by Ingvar Ambjørnsen.

== 1990s ==
Hauge was the owner of the first electric car imported to Norway in 1989. He traveled on toll roads without paying the fare until the government confiscated his car. He bought it back and continued to drive on the toll roads still without paying. This went on until the authorities officially decided to eliminate toll charges for electric cars. He was chosen by Tesla Motors to receive the first Tesla Model S all-electric car delivered in Europe to a retail customer in August 2013.

In the 1990s Bellona established a Russian branch, with a strong focus on how to deal with the large amounts of nuclear waste that had accumulated over the years. This led to several years of controversies with the Russian authorities. Alexander Nikitin, Bellona's representative in Murmansk was arrested by the Federal Security Service and charged with treason through espionage. After several years of court proceedings Nikitin was acquitted. Hauge has later described this period as the toughest fight in the history of Bellona, and with the outcome he was most proud of.

== Later years ==
Over the years Hauge and Bellona has developed a more pragmatic approach, with an emphasis on finding solutions through collaboration with the industry. He has also participated in European Union workgroups for drafting new policies on climate and energy.

He appeared on Time magazine's list of "Heroes of the Environment" in October 2007.
