= Marquis of San Saturnino =

Title of Spanish Nobility

Marquisate Crown

The Marquis of San Saturnino is a title of Spanish nobility granted on 21 December 1688 by the King Charles II of Spain to D. Pedro Álvarez de Reynoso y Andrade, Galloso y Feijoo, Perpetual “Regidor” (Mayor) of Ourense. His name refers to the Galician municipality of San Saturnino situated in the province of Corunna.

Famous members include the 6th Marquis Don Jose Mariano Quindos y Tejada, Mayor of Madrid, Gentlemen of the Royal Maestranza de caballería of Ronda, Gentleman Great Cross of the Order of Charles III, Senator, “ Gentilhombre de camara” (Gentleman of the Bedchamber) to the King Alfonso XII and the 7th Marchioness Doña Maria de la Natividad Quindos y Villaroel, his daughter, also Duchess of la Conquista, and Marchioness of Gracia Real de Ledesma, of Palacios and Viscountess of la Frontera, “Camarera mayor” (First Lady of the Bedchamber) to Queen Maria Christina of Austria. Also well known were the 8th Marquis, Don Alfredo Moreno Uribe, who was vice president of Renfe, the Spanish national railway company and his nephew, the present and 10th Marquis, Don Jose Manuel Romero Moreno, also 8th Count of Fontao. The 10th Marquis was the lawyer of the household and family of HM King Juan Carlos I of Spain. Also he was the president of the CEAR and the vice president of the FRIDE Foundations. He has been institutional member of the Club of Madrid and member of the Board of the Trustees of Patrimonio Nacional.

== Marquises of San Saturnino ==
1. Don Pedro Álvarez de Reynoso, 1st Marquis of San Saturnino. 1688- Married to Doña Rosa de Andrade. His son:
2. Don Pedro Álvarez de Reynoso, 2nd Marquis of San Saturnino. Without issue, he was succeeded by the son of her sister Doña Rosa Álvarez de Reynoso y Andrade, married to Don Alvaro Quindos y Bolano.
3. Don José Jacinto Quindos y Reynoso de Andrade, 3rd Marquis of San Saturnino, son of the 2nd Marchioness. Married to Doña Jacinta Pardo. His son:
4. Don José Javier Quindos y Pardo, 4th Marquis of San Saturnino, son of the 3rd Marquis. Married to Doña Carmen Quiroga y Quindos, his niece. His son:
5. Don José María Quindos y Quiroga -1821, 5th Marquis of San Saturnino, son of the 4th Marquis. Married to Doña Segunda Tejada Eulate. His son:
6. Don José Mariano Quindos y Tejada1822-1900, 6th Marquis of San Saturnino, son of the 5th Marquis. Married to Doña Fernanda Villaroel Goicolea, Viscountess of la Frontera. His daughter:
7. Doña María de la Natividad Quindos y Villaroel 1900–1953, 7th Marchioness of San Saturnino, also 2nd Duchess of la Conquista, Grandee of Spain, Camarera mayor to the Queen, daughter of the 6th Marquis. Married to Don Asis Arias Davila Matheu, Count of Cumbres Altas, Ambassador of Spain, “ Gentilhombre Grande de España” (Gentleman Grandee of Spain) to the King Alfonso XIII. Without issue, the title was inherited by the son of a third cousin, the 3rd Count of Fontao
8. Don Alfredo Moreno Uribe 1954–1981, 8th Marquis of San Saturnino, also 5th Count of Fontao. Married to Doña Ana Rosa Gomez y Rodulfo. Without issue the title was inherited by his sister
9. Doña María Moreno Uribe 1981–1991, 9th Marchioness of San Saturnino, also 6th Countess of Fontao. Without issue the title was inherited by her nephew
10. Don Jose Manuel Romero Moreno 1993- actual titular, 10th Marquis of San Saturnino, also 8th Count of Fontao. Married to Doña Ana Duplá del Moral
