= Gentilhombre de cámara con ejercicio =

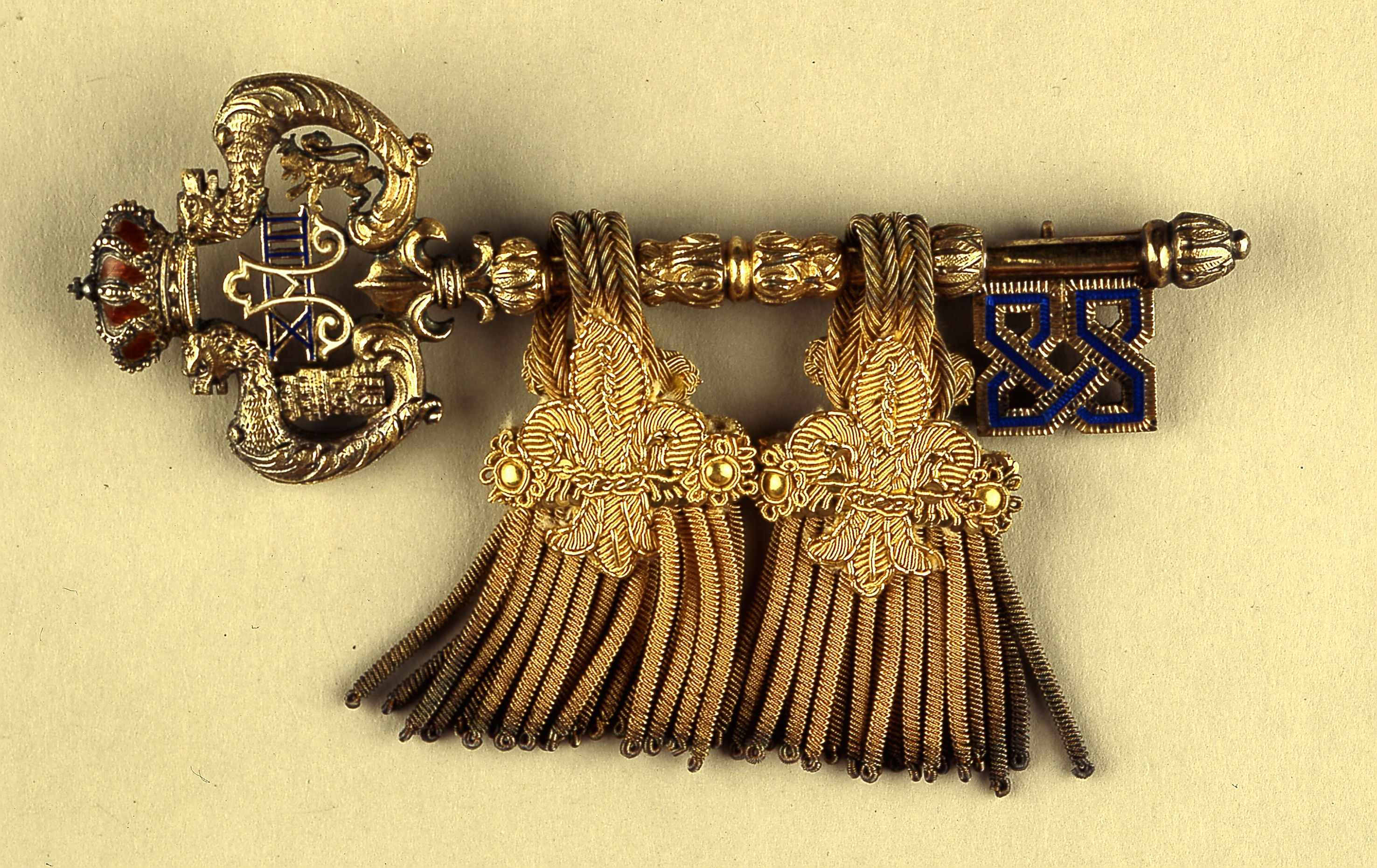
Insignia of the Gentlemen of the Bedchamber, reign of Alfonso XIII

The Gentilhombres de cámara con ejercicio (Gentlemen of the Bedchamber) was a palatine class of honorary royal servants of the Royal Household and Heritage of the Crown of Spain, who acceded to that class as an honor awarded by the Monarch. The members of this class neither had specific functions inside the ceremonial scheme of the Court, nor exercised active service with a few exceptions, being their appointment a sign of the royal appreciation.

This way, prominent men were nominated during the reign of the last King before the Second Spanish Republic, Alfonso XIII. As said very few of them had specific functions at the service to the King and very few of them belonged to the nobility. In fact, at the moment of the suppression of this Office, they remained 521 “Gentilhombres de cámara con ejercicio y servidumbre”. Among them, only 155 belonged to the titled nobility.

This Court class was just behind the category of “Gentilhombres Grandes de España con ejercicio y servidumbre”.

Their badge was a golden gilded key with tassels also of gold. The key was placed horizontally on the waist to the right side on uniforms, dress-coat or frock coat. They were formally under the command of the “Sumiller de Corps” and, for their condition, they had free entrance to the Royal Palace of Madrid up to the Chamber.

They were styled “Ilustrísimos señores Gentilhombres de cámara con ejercicio”.

This Office was suppressed after the Second Spanish Republic was declared on April 14, 1931, and it was never re-created after the restoration of Monarchy in 1975. Among the 520 “Gentilhombres de camara” at that time, there were famous Army officers like the, then successful during Rif War, General Francisco Franco, the General Francisco Gómez-Jordana, 1st Count of Jordana, the General Joaquín Milans del Bosch and the General José Enrique Varela or the Air Commanders of the Plus Ultra Ramón Franco and Julio Ruiz de Alda Miqueleiz, active politicians like Eugenio Espinosa de los Monteros, José Luis Goyoaga Escario, Guillermo de Osma y Scull, Manuel González-Hontoria y Fernández-Ladreda and Juan Antonio Suanzes Fernández, physicians like the doctor Mariano Gómez Ulla, prominent businessmen like Fernando María de Ybarra, 1st Marquess of Arriluce de Ybarra and Carlos Godó Valls, prestigious engineers like Emilio Herrera, José Ortiz-Echagüe, Eduardo Torroja or Jose Moreno Osorio, 4th Count of Fontao, well-known writers like José María Pemán, art curators like Manuel Escrivá de Romaní 10th Count of Casal or loyal employees of the Royal Household like Dámaso Berenguer, 1st Count of Xauen, former General Commander of the Halberdiers, Emilio de Torres, 1st Marquess of Torres de Mendoza private Secretary to the King and Miguel González de Castejón, 1st Count of Aybar, General Comptroller of the Royal Household.

== See also ==
- Gentilhombres Grandes de España con ejercicio y servidumbre
- Mayordomo mayor
- Caballerizo mayor
