= Bellona Foundation =

International environmental NGO

The Bellona Foundation
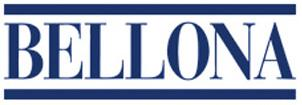
- Company type: NGO
- Industry: Environmentalism
- Founded: June 16, 1986
- Headquarters: Oslo, Norway
- Area served: Norway, EU, Russia and U.S.
- Key people: Frederic Hauge (co-founder)
- Revenue: 764,898 (2020)
- Number of employees: About 70 (2010)
- Website: www.bellona.org, www.bellona.no, www.bellona.ru

The Bellona Foundation is an international environmental NGO headquartered in Oslo, Norway, with branches in Europe and North America. Founded in 1986 by Frederic Hauge and Rune Haaland as a direct action protest group to curb Norway's oil and gas industry pollution, it grew to be multi-disciplinary and multinational in scope and maintains offices in Oslo, Brussels, Berlin and Vilnius. In 2022, Bellona ended activities in Russia and relocated experts to the Vilnius, Lithuania office to assist Ukraine with environmental challenges resulting from the Russian invasion. In 2023, the Russian Prosecutor General's Office recognized Bellona as an "undesirable organization".

Bellona works with ecologists, engineers, economists, attorneys, journalists, specialists in the natural and social sciences, to accomplish its objectives.

== History ==
In 1994, the Bellona Foundation's report "Sources of Radioactive Contamination in Murmansk and Archangelsk Counties" raised serious concerns about the safety of the decommissioned Soviet nuclear-powered submarines after the dissolution of the USSR. In February 1996, Russian FSB arrested Bellona's Russian expert Alexander Nikitin, a former Soviet naval officer, and charged him with treason through espionage for his contributions to Bellona's report on the nuclear safety within the Russian Northern Fleet. The Russian Supreme Court exonerated him in 2000.

In 2003, Bellona assessed radioactive contamination at Sellafield nuclear reprocessing facility in England.

At the 2009 United Nations Climate Change Conference (COP15) in Copenhagen, Bellona presented "101 Solutions to Climate Change".

In 2013, Bellona Foundation filed a police report after it learned that a "disposal well in the Norwegian Sea owned by Norway's state oil company Statoil leaked 3,428 tons of hazardous chemicals and oil-based drilling fluids over six years at the Njord site".

Russia's invasion of Ukraine on 24 February 2022 led Bellona to terminate its operations in Russia, close its offices, and relocate its staff and expertise to a new office in Vilnius, which opened in 2023.

In April 2023, Russia declared Bellona as an "undesirable" organization.

== Funding ==
Bellona's yearly spending was 25 million Norwegian Kroner (NOK) in 2001. Amongst the sources: 10 million NOK came from selling advertisements; 6 million NOK was received from the Norwegian Ministry of Foreign Affairs for projects in Russia, and 1 million NOK was received from the Norwegian government for general purposes; 6 million NOK was received from business sector to implement the B7 program; 2 million NOK came from donations and gifts.

For many years, Bellona has collaborated with major international philanthropic organizations, including the Children's Investment Fund Foundation (CIFF) and the ClimateWorks Foundation. The organization also receives project-specific funding from European and Norwegian sources, such as the European Climate Foundation (ECF), the European Union's Horizon programme, the Research Council of Norway, and the Norwegian Radiation and Nuclear Safety Authority.

== Criticism ==
In Norway, the Bellona Foundation was criticized for "seeking publicity", and in Russia — for accepting funds from the Norwegian government. Some maintain that Bellona damaged its environmental credibility by "cooperating with market agents", transforming it into more of a consultancy for private companies than an environmental NGO.

== See also ==
- CC9
