= José Lladó =

Spanish politician and businessman (1934–2024)

José Lladó Fernández-Urrutia (29 March 1934 – 14 February 2024) was a Spanish politician and businessman.

== Early life and career ==
Son of the president of the Bank Urquijo - Juan Lladó Sánchez - and grandson of the politician Jose Lladó Vallés, he took a doctor's degree in Chemical Sciences at the University of Madrid. He was a Member of Honor of the American Chemical Society. He was executive President of the CSIC. In addition, he was appointed in 1976 Minister of Trade and then, in 1977 Minister of Transport and Communications. Later, in 1979 he was Ambassador of Spain in the United States. He was the first President of the Royal Patronage of the Museo Nacional Centro de Arte Reina Sofía.

Lladó was the President of the INCIPE Foundation, president of the jury of the Arts Award of the Prince of Asturias Awards from 1991 and President of the Xavier Zubiri Foundation.

Lladó was a member of the Board of the Trustees of important Spanish companies, and he was President-Founder and principal shareholder of Técnicas Reunidas.

== Personal life and death ==
Lladó had five children from Pilar Arburua, daughter of Francisco Franco's Minister Manuel Arburúa de la Miyar: Pilar, (married (divorced) to Rafael Ordovás, son of Olympic equestrian Manuel Ordovás and secondly to Ambassador Antonio Pérez-Hernández), Juan (married to Susana Álvarez Salas), María, (married (divorced) to Jorge Pujol), José Manuel (married to Marta Tiagonce) and Marta (married to Carlos Romero, son of the Count de Fontao).

José Lladó died on 14 February 2024, at the age of 89.

== Sources ==
- "President and Foundation's Board of Management". INCIPE.
- Vegas, Patricia (23 June 2006). "José Lladó: Un ex ministro en el parqué". El Economista (in Spanish).
- Permuy, Isabel (13 November 2011). "José Lladó: "España volverá a respirar enseguida"" (in Spanish). ABC.es.
- "El Corte Inglés, Indra, José Lladó y Pere Llorens, galardonados por su aportación al comercio" (in Spanish). Europa Press. 3 November 2011.
- "Equities: Tecnicas Reunidas SA". Financial Times.
