= Diego Hidalgo Schnur =

Spanish philanthropist, intellectual and businessman (born 1942)

Diego Hidalgo Schnur (born 5 November 1942) is a Spanish philanthropist, intellectual and businessman. He is the son of Diego Hidalgo y Durán (1886–1961), who was a prominent jurist, author, intellectual and Minister of War under the Second Spanish Republic (1931–1936), and of Gerda Schnur de Hidalgo (1910–1969), also an intellectual who lived in Paris from 1926 and 1939. He speaks several languages, and is fluent in Spanish, French, English.

== Early life and education ==
Born in Madrid on 5 November 1942, he studied Law in the Complutense University of Madrid (1959-1964) and obtained a Master in Business administration from Harvard (1966-1968). He was a PhD candidate in Political Sciences in the City University of New York (1996-2001).

== Career ==
Hidalgo worked at the World Bank from 1968 to 1977 where he was upgraded and in 1974 became Chief of Division, with responsibilities over the projects of the World Bank in the 45 Sub-Saharan African countries. He was the youngest person and the first Spaniard occupying that position. He is the founder of FRIDA (Fund for Research and Investment for the Development of Africa) and President of DFC (Development Finance Corporation), from 1977.

He took part in the foundation of PRISA, the main Spanish media group and one of the most important in Spain. He currently sits on the board of PRISA, as well as the daily El País since 1980 and the radio channel Cadena SER since 1984. He also took part in the administration of several publishing houses and magazines.

In 1994, he was selected in the Fellow's Program of Weatherhead Center for International Affairs of Harvard University, where between 1996 and 1999 he was Senior Associate of the European Studies Center. In 2009 he was the winner of the Commitment to Development “Ideas in Action” Award of the Center for Global Development.

== Founder ==
He is the founder and presently honorary president of FRIDE, (Fundación para las Relaciones Internacionales y el Diálogo Exterior), of the Club of Madrid, an association of more than seventy former democratically elected heads of State and Government, the CITPax (International Toledo Center for Peace) and the Fundacio Maimona. He is the Chairman of the Board for DARA (international organization) and Concordia 21. He is also a founding member and senior fellow of the Gorbachev Foundation of North America (GFNA), and an active member of the Club of Rome and its council of Governors.

== Books ==
He has published books as El futuro de españa Taurus 1996 (the future of Spain), in the top 10 best sellers in Spain during 23 weeks and Europa, Globalización y Unión Monetaria (Europe, Globalization and Monetary Union) Siddarth Mehta, 1998.
