= CC9 =

The United Nations Climate Change Conference logo

In 2009, the Club of Madrid, the Bellona Foundation, and the utility company Hafslund ASA organized the CC9 (Climate Conference 09: Green Technology and Finance – Striking a Fair Climate Deal). It took place 4–5 June 2009 at Hafslund Manor in Sarpsborg, Norway with the aim of promoting awareness of climate change, and furthering the cause of funding and support for green technology. It was followed by a climate festival for children in the adjacent park on 6 June. CC9 was the successor to an earlier conference, CC8 (Climate Conference 08: Technology and Finance in Climate Cooperation), which had similar aims and functions.

== Climate Conference 09 ==
The objective of CC9 was to contribute to the conclusion of a climate agreement by advancing funding for green technology.

=== Notable speakers and attendants ===
His Royal Highnesses Crown Prince Haakon of Norway opened the Conference.

Among those who spoke at CC9 was Robert F. Kennedy Jr. Kennedy is the founder and current chair of the Waterkeeper Alliance, an organization working to improve water quality in the United States and elsewhere in the world. As a lawyer, Kennedy handles cases for the Natural Resources Defense Council (NRDC), a U.S. based environmental organization. Robert F. Kennedy Jr. was the first member of the Kennedy family to visit Norway.

Other notable individuals participated at CC9, including Norwegian Prime Minister Jens Stoltenberg, Norwegian Minister of the Environment and International Development Erik Solheim, and Stephen O. Andersen, director of Strategic Climate Projects in the U.S. Environmental Protection Agency (EPA).

Stephen O. Andersen, is a renowned environmental expert working for the EPA, the equivalent of the Norwegian Ministry of the Environment. Andersen has been a key player in the work of the Montreal Protocol, an international environmental treaty that negotiated the elimination of ozone-depleting gases. Andersen is the EPA's director of strategic projects, in the Climate Protection Partnerships Division.

Also from the United States, Ira Magaziner, head of the Clinton Climate Initiative (CCI), was in attendance. The CCI forms part of the William J. Clinton Foundation (founded by former US president Bill Clinton). The foundation's work includes efforts to cut the costs of climate technology in large cities.

Representing the African continent was the former president of Tanzania, Benjamin Mkapa, and the Minister of Foreign Affairs of Niger Aïchatou Mindaoudou. Mindaoudou gave a speech at CC9 entitled "What is at stake for women and the planet - climate change and sustainable development in Africa. Business models for poverty alleviation and green growth".

A number of additional participants from Asia and Europe were also present at the climate conference.
