= County of Fontao =

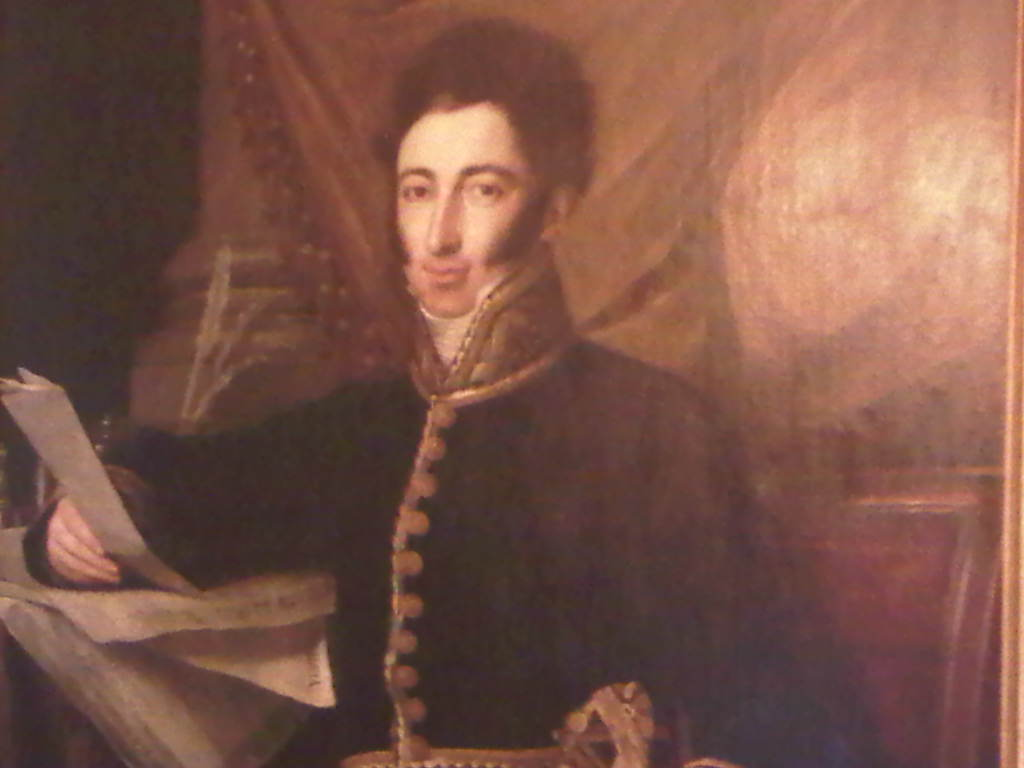
Portrait of the Spanish aristocrat and politician José María Moscoso de Altamira (1788–1855), 1st Count of Fontao. During the reign of Isabella II of Spain, he served as Minister of the Interior and Minister of Public Works, as well as President of the Cortes and the first President of the Senate.

The County of Fontao is a title of Spanish nobility granted on 8 January 1840 by the Queen Isabella II to Don José María Moscoso y Quiroga, first President of the Senate of Spain after the creation of this upper chamber in 1837. His name refers to the Galician old “Señorio” (Lordship) of Fontao situated in the province of Lugo.

Famous members include the 1st Count who was President of the Cortes and then Minister of the Police to King Ferdinand VII during the Trienio Liberal and later Minister of Public Works to Queen Isabella II and the first President of the Senate when this chamber was created in 1837. Other famous members include his great-grandson, the 4th Count, Don José Moreno Osorio, prestigious railway engineer who was president and general manager of the North Rail Transportation Company and after the Spanish Civil War, vice president of Renfe, the Spanish national railway and “Gentilhombre de camara” (Gentleman of the Bedchamber) to the King Alfonso XIII. He was, in fact, the engineer who, during the decade of 1920 brought from United States to Spain the techniques of the railway electrification system. The latter's son, the 5th Count, Don Alfredo Moreno Uribe, was also vice president of Renfe. The nephew of the latter, the present and 8th Count is Don Jose Manuel Romero Moreno, also 10th Marquis of San Saturnino. The 8th Count is the legal counsellor of the household and family of King Juan Carlos I of Spain. Equally, he is the president of the CEAR and the vice president of the FRIDE Foundations. He is institutional member of the Club of Madrid and member of the Board of the Trustees of Patrimonio Nacional.

== Counts of Fontao ==
1. Don José María Moscoso y Quiroga, 1st Count of Fontao. 1840–1854. Married to Doña María Antonia Taboada y Bueno.
2. Doña Sofía Moscoso y Taboada, 1854–1869. 2nd Countess of Fontao, daughter of the 1st Count. Married to Don José Moreno Sopranís.
3. Don Alfredo Moreno Moscoso, 1869–1921. 3rd Count of Fontao, son of the 2nd Countess. Married to Doña María Antonia Osorio Chacón.
4. Don José Moreno Osorio, 1921–1963. 4th Count of Fontao, son of the 3rd Count. Married to Doña María Uribe Garrido.
5. Don Alfredo Moreno Uribe, 1969–1981. 5th Count of Fontao, son of the 4th Count, also 8th Marquis of San Saturnino. Married to Doña Ana Rosa Gomez y Rodulfo. Without issue the title was inherited by his sister
6. Doña María Moreno Uribe 1981–1983, 6th Countess of Fontao, also 9th Marchioness of San Saturnino. Without issue the title was inherited by her sister
7. Doña Pilar Moreno Uribe 1983–1993, 7th Countess of Fontao, Married to Don Carlos Romero de Lecea.
8. Don Jose Manuel Romero Moreno 1993- current holder, 8th Count of Fontao, also 10th Marquis of San Saturnino. Married to Doña Ana Duplá del Moral
