= Customer advocacy =

Customer advocacy is a specialized form of customer service in which companies focus on what is deemed to be best for the customer. It is a change in a company's culture that is supported by customer-focused customer service and marketing techniques.

== Customer advocacy business model ==
A customer advocacy policy encompasses all aspects of customer contact, including products, services, sales and complaints. Some examples of a customer advocacy approach are suggesting a product even if the profit margin is less for the company, setting service call appointments based on the customer's (not the company's) preferred hours, or recommending a competitor's product because it is better at meeting the customer's needs. However, there are times when, if a customer is happy with the service, they will pay more for the service as a 'per se' talent fee.

== Role of the customer advocate ==
Customer advocates are facilitators between customers and the company. They are trained in cross-functional roles and empowered to provide customers with assistance in all areas of the business. The role of the customer advocate is three-fold:

- To be the main contact for the customer in handling a question or problem, and to keep the customer updated with timely and frequent information about progress towards resolving the issue.
- To facilitate a resolution by bringing together the appropriate department heads.
- To implement a procedure that ensures the problem does not occur again, or recommends products or services to better meet customers' needs.

== Measuring customer advocacy ==
Customer advocacy can be integrated into a company's strategic goals and measured through customer satisfaction, retention, and profitability. A popular proxy for customer advocacy is the Net Promoter Score. Customer advocacy programs are often measured by the value or revenue they influence for an organization. Common ways customer advocates can help drive revenue include making referrals, acting as customer references, and through upsell or cross-sell of additional products. The return-on-investment (ROI) of an advocacy program can be calculated by looking at the overall investment or program spend compared to revenue influenced by the program.
