= Club of Madrid =

Non-profit organization

Club de Madrid
- Formation: 2001; 25 years ago
- Headquarters: Madrid, Spain
- President: Danilo Türk
- Vice Presidents: Han Seung-soo; Michelle Bachelet

Club de Madrid is an independent, non-partisan, non-profit organization created to promote democracy and change in the international community. It is composed of 127 regular members from 74 countries, including 5 Nobel Peace Prize laureates and 23 first female heads of state or government. Club de Madrid is the world's largest forum of former heads of state and government.

The organisation has six honorary members, which include Aung San Suu Kyi, Ban Ki-moon, Ángel Gurría, Enrique Iglesias, Javier Solana, and Juan Somavía.

Among its main goals are the strengthening of democratic institutions and counseling on the resolution of political conflicts in two key areas: democratic leadership and governance, and response to crisis and post-crisis situations.

== History and actions ==
Club de Madrid was founded in October 2001 as a result of the Conference on Democratic Transition and Consolidation held in Madrid with the objective of creating a permanent forum for governments to consult, and "be able to access expert's opinions". The event was organized by the think tank FRIDE (Fundación para las Relaciones Internacionales y el Diálogo Exteriores).

The conference was attended by 32 current and former heads of state and government, who discussed their ideas and conclusions with over 100 experts. Among the attendees were former president of the USSR Mikhail Gorbachev, former Canadian prime minister Kim Campbell, King Juan Carlos I of Spain, former democratic prime ministers of Spain Adolfo Suárez, Leopoldo Calvo Sotelo, Felipe González and José María Aznar, former prime minister of the Central African Republic Martin Ziguélé, and US president Bill Clinton.

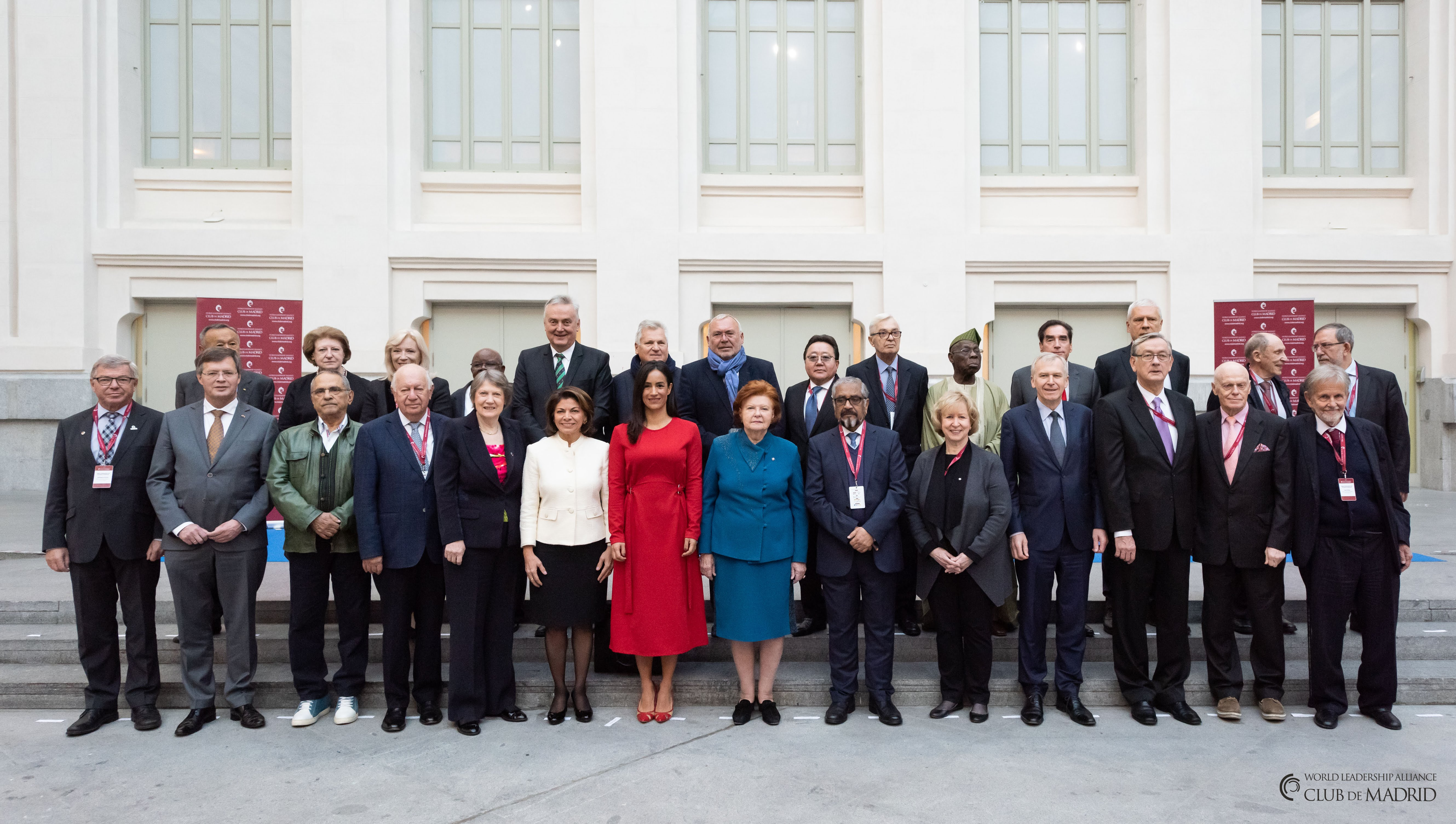
Club de Madrid members at an Annual Policy Dialogue in Madrid in 2019

The club's first secretary general was the co-founder of FRIDE, Antonio Álvarez-Couceiro, and its first president was former President of Brazil Fernando Henrique Cardoso, who held that post until 2006. In 2004, former Canadian prime minister Kim Campbell became secretary general until 2006, when the Spanish diplomat Fernando Perpiñá-Robert took the post. Former president of Chile Ricardo Lagos was elected as the organization's president in 2006, until 2010, when he ceded the position to former prime minister of the Netherlands Wim Kok. Also in 2010, Carlos Westendorp, Spanish diplomat and politician, became secretary general.

Former president of Latvia Vaira Vīķe-Freiberga was elected president of the club in 2014. In 2016, María Elena Agüero became secretary general and, in 2019, former president of Slovenia Danilo Türk was elected president, posts they both still hold.

The club's first General Assembly was held in Madrid in October 2002 approved the organization's first Annual Policy Dialogue, year-long initiatives that involve members, other organizations, and experts in working groups to formulate policy recommendations on the decided topic. The results of some Annual Policy Dialogues and other programs have been echoed and supported in national and international legislation and pacts.

List of Annual Policy Dialogues
Year	Topic	Place
2002	Democracy	Palace Hotel, Madrid
2003	The Role of the IMF and its Contribution to Democratic Governance	Palace Hotel, Madrid
2004	Democracies in Danger: Diagnoses and Prescriptions	Parliament, Madrid
2005	Democracy in the Post Communist World: Unfinished Business	Ministry of Foreign Affairs, Prague
2005	International Summit on Democracy, Security and Terrorism	Madrid, Spain
2006	Challenges of Energy and Democratic Leadership	Palace of the Senate, Madrid
2007	Democratizing Energy: Geopolitics and Power	Instituto Cervantes, Madrid
2008	Leadership for Shared Societies	Rotterdam, Netherlands
2009	Political Dimensions of the World Economic Crisis	Palacio de Congresos, Madrid
2010	Reconstruction and Democratic Development: the Case of Haiti	Representation of the European Commission in Spain, Madrid
2011	Digital Technologies for 21st Century Democracy	New York, USA
2012	Asia Pacific Forum: Building a More Resilient Pacific in the 21st Century World Order	Papeete, Tahiti, French Polynesia
2012	Harnessing 21st Century Solutions: a Focus on Women	Little Rock, Arkansas, USA
2013	South Caucasus Forum	Ganja and Baku, Azerbaijan
2014	Societies that Work: Jobs for Inclusive Growth	Coolum Beach, Queensland, Australia
2014	II Global Shared Societies Forum	Baku, Azerbaijan
2014	Democracy and Human Rights: a Call to Action	Florence, Italy
2015	Preventing and Countering Violent Extremism	Madrid, Spain
2016	Inclusive, Sustainable and Resilient Cities in the Belt and Road Initiative	Guangzhou, China
2018	Education for Shared Societies	Lisbon, Portugal
2019	Digital Transformation and the Future of Democracy	Madrid, Spain
2020	Multilateralism that Delivers	Online
2021	Rethinking Democracy	Online
2022	Leading in a World of Converging Crises	Berlin, Germany
2023	Rethinking Social Development for People and Planet	Brazil
2025	Driving Sustainable Futures for All	Nairobi, Kenya

The Club de Madrid pushed for a constitutional reform in Haiti and promoted the adoption of a National Pact in 2014 to reach a democratic consensus.

With the onset of the COVID-19 pandemic, Club de Madrid called for international cooperation, solidarity, and policies such as the "creation of an international fund for assistance to the Global South to deal with the consequences of COVID-19" and supported "the IMF’s call for coordinated fiscal stimuli to mitigate against long-lasting economic damage". The organization called on the World Bank to support the coordinated purchase of pandemic response equipment.

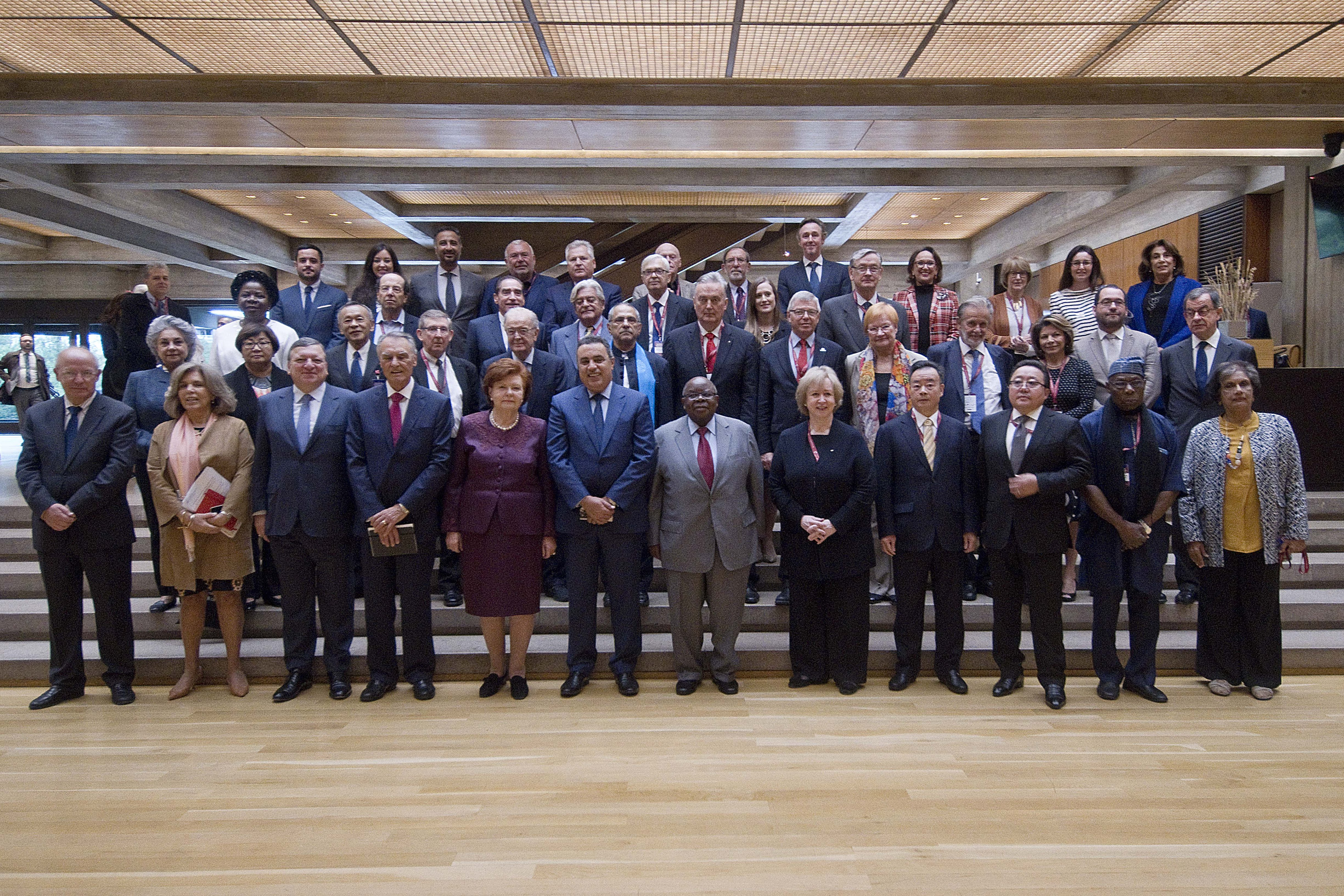
Club de Madrid members at an Annual Policy Dialogue in Portugal in 2018

Club de Madrid issued a statement in support of the 2020 International Day of the World's Indigenous Peoples, endorsing practices of restorative justice and highlighting the cosmovision of numerous indigenous peoples towards nature. Also in 2020, the organization appealed to the authorities of Belarus to "stop detentions and the use of force against unarmed demonstrators" after the presidential elections in the country.

Club de Madrid also condemned the 2021 coup d'état in Myanmar and called for the "immediate and unconditional release of President Win Myint, State Counsellor Aung San Suu Kyi, members of government, of the National League for Democracy (NLD) and of civil society activists who have been detained". Also in 2021, the organization and 46 of its members publicly supported the suspension of the WTO's intellectual property rules towards COVID-19 vaccines to make vaccination more accessible.

In June 2022, the Club de Madrid called on the Tunisian president Kais Saied to release the politician Hamadi Jebali. Club de Madrid has also repeatedly called for the release of opposition leader Alexei Navalny and other political prisoners in Russia, and for the end of the Russian invasion of Ukraine through dialogue and diplomacy.

In response to the 8 January Brasília attacks, Club de Madrid condemned the event.

In 2024, the Club of Madrid sent an open letter to the G20 group in which it supported Brazil's proposal to tax the super-rich to alleviate "extreme" inequality and raise the money needed for investment in industry and the green transition. In the letter, they warned that taxes are the foundation of a civilized, enterprising and prosperous society. The Club of Madrid pointed out that the Super Rich have unproductively accumulated trillions of dollars that could have been productively invested in communities, education, health and infrastructure. The result is extreme inequality, which is why 19 members of Club of Madrid believe that a new international agreement on the taxation of the super-rich is necessary. The letter was signed by, among others, former president of Chile Michelle Bachelet, former Slovenian president Danilo Tuerk, former Swedish prime minister Stefan Lofven, former Spanish prime ministers Felipe Gonzalez and Jose Luis Rodriguez Zapatero and former French prime minister Dominique de Villepin.

== Composition and structure ==
As of May 2025, there are 127 full members, all of whom are previous government officials with full voting rights. The club also has institutional members and foundations – private and public organizations that share similar democratic objectives, including FRIDE, the Gorbachev Foundation of North America (GFNA), both original sponsors of the founding conference in 2001, the Madrid City Council, the Regional Government of Madrid, and the Government of Spain. Additionally, there are six honorary members (e.g. Javier Solana, Aung San Suu Kyi) and several fellows, who are experts on democratic change.

Full members, representatives of the constituent foundations, the secretary general of the organization, and honorary members form the General Assembly, the highest representative and governing body of Club de Madrid. The General Assembly meets at least once a year to vote on the organization's activities and reports, the proposal of new members, and the designation of the secretary general, board of directors and president, among other activities.

The board of directors manages the interests of the organization according to the directives of the General Assembly. The body is composed of the president, currently Danilo Türk, two vice-presidents, currently former South Korean prime minister Han Seung-soo and former president of Chile Michelle Bachelet, one member from each constituent foundation, the secretary general, and up to six other members.

The president represents the organization and is elected for a term of three years, renewable once. The vice-presidents are also elected for three years, renewable once, and they work closely with the president.

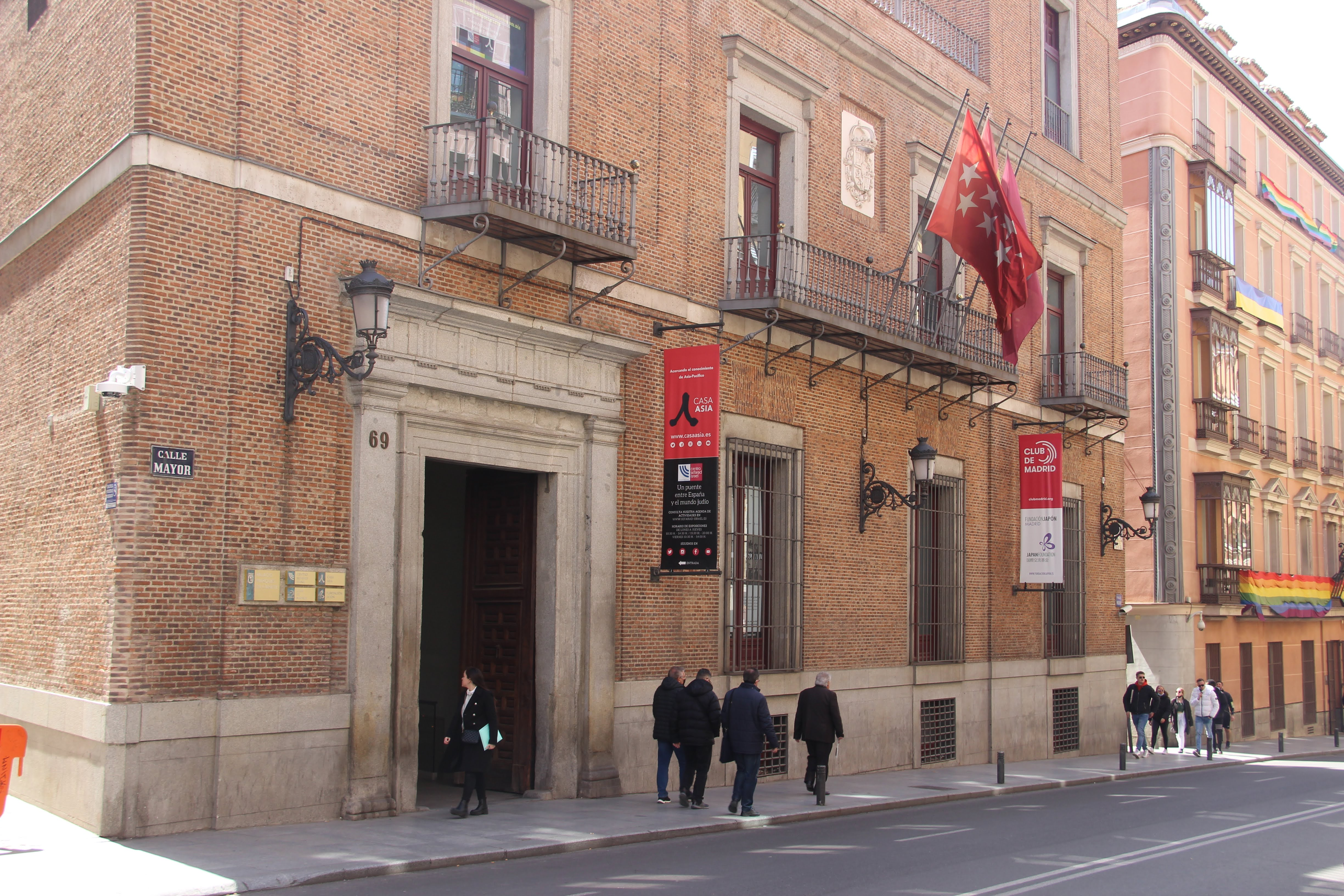
Club de Madrid's Secretariat

Club de Madrid has two advisory bodies, the President's Circle, made up of individuals and organizations that support the club's objectives, and the Advisory Committee, composed of fellows who are experts in their fields. The Secretariat, under the direction of the secretary general, is responsible for the daily management of the Club de Madrid.

== Funding ==
Club de Madrid is a non-profit organization and members offer their services on a pro bono basis. It relies financially on donations which are used to support a permanent Secretariat and fund specific projects. The club's accounts are audited annually by an external organization and publicly available.

The Club of Madrid Foundation Inc. (COMFI) is a grant-making foundation that has US 501(c)(3) tax exemption status. It exists to raise funds in support of the club's charitable and educational activities. COMFI is independent and not controlled by the club itself, but solely by a four-person board of directors.

== Members ==
Club de Madrid has 127 full members of which 17 are former Heads of State and/or government from Africa and the Middle East, 26 from the Americas, 17 from Asia-Pacific, and 60 from Europe.

=== List of current members ===
List of members as of October 2025.

Name	Age	Nation	Party	Office(s) held
Valdas Adamkus	100	Lithuania	None	President of Lithuania (1998–2003, 2004–2009)
Esko Aho	72	Finland	Centre	Prime Minister of Finland (1991–1995)
Óscar Arias	86	Costa Rica	PLN	President of Costa Rica (1986–1990, 2006–2010)
José María Aznar	73	Spain	PP	President of the Government of Spain (1996–2004)
Michelle Bachelet	75	Chile	Socialist	President of Chile (2006–2010, 2014–2018); Executive director of UN Women (2010–2013); United Nations High Commissioner for Human Rights (2018–2022)
Jan Peter Balkenende	70	Netherlands	CDA	Prime Minister of the Netherlands (2002–2010)
Joyce Banda	76	Malawi	People's Party	President of Malawi (2012–2014)
José Manuel Barroso	70	Portugal	PSD	Prime Minister of Portugal (2002–2004); President of the European Commission (2004–2014)
Carl Bildt	77	Sweden	Moderate	Prime Minister of Sweden (1991–1994); High Representative for Bosnia and Herzegovina (1995–1997)
Valdis Birkavs	84	Latvia	LC	Prime Minister of Latvia (1993–1994)
Kjell Magne Bondevik	79	Norway	Christian Democratic	Prime Minister of Norway (1997–2000, 2001–2005)
Gordon Brown	75	United Kingdom	Labour	Prime Minister of the United Kingdom (2007–2010)
Gro Harlem Brundtland	87	Norway	Labour	Prime Minister of Norway (1981, 1986–1989, 1990–1996); Director-general of the World Health Organization (1998–2003)
Jerzy Buzek	86	Poland	Civic Platform	Prime Minister of Poland (1997–2001); President of the European Parliament (2009–2012)
Felipe Calderón	64	Mexico	PAN	President of Mexico (2006–2012)
Micheline Calmy-Rey	81	Switzerland	Social Democratic	Member of the Federal Council (2003–2011) (President in 2007 and 2011)
Kim Campbell	79	Canada	Progressive Conservative	Prime Minister of Canada (1993)
Fernando Henrique Cardoso	95	Brazil	Social Democracy	President of Brazil (1995–2003)
Aníbal Cavaco Silva	87	Portugal	Social Democratic	Prime Minister of Portugal (1985–1995); President of Portugal (2006–2016)
Laura Chinchilla	67	Costa Rica	PLN	President of Costa Rica (2010–2014)
Joaquim Chissano	87	Mozambique	FRELIMO	President of Mozambique (1986–2005)
Jean Chrétien	92	Canada	Liberal	Prime Minister of Canada (1993–2003)
Helen Clark	76	New Zealand	Labour	Prime Minister of New Zealand (1999–2008)
Bill Clinton	80	United States	Democratic	President of the United States (1993–2001)
Marie-Louise Coleiro Preca	67	Malta	Labour	President of Malta (2014–2019)
Dominique de Villepin	72	France	RS	Prime Minister of France (2005–2007)
Philip Dimitrov	71	Bulgaria	SDS	Prime Minister of Bulgaria (1991–1992)
Luísa Diogo	68	Mozambique	FRELIMO	Prime Minister of Mozambique (2004–2010)
Leonel Fernández	72	Dominican Republic	PLD	President of the Dominican Republic (1996–2000, 2004–2012)
José María Figueres	71	Costa Rica	PLN	President of Costa Rica (1994–1998)
Vigdís Finnbogadóttir	96	Iceland	None	President of Iceland (1980–1996)
Vicente Fox	84	Mexico	PAN	President of Mexico (2000–2006)
Eduardo Frei Ruiz-Tagle	84	Chile	Christian Democratic	President of Chile (1994–2000)
César Gaviria	79	Colombia	Liberal	President of Colombia (1990–1994); Secretary General of the Organization of American States (1994–2004)
Amine Pierre Gemayel	84	Lebanon	Kata'eb	President of Lebanon (1982–1988)
Felipe González	84	Spain	PSOE	President of the Government of Spain (1982–1996)
Dalia Grybauskaitė	70	Lithuania	None	President of Lithuania (2009–2019)
Alfred Gusenbauer	66	Austria	Social Democratic	Chancellor of Austria (2007–2008)
António Guterres	77	Portugal	Socialist	Prime Minister of Portugal (1995–2002); UN High Commissioner for Refugees (2005–2016); UN Secretary-General (2016–present)
Tarja Halonen	82	Finland	Social Democratic	President of Finland (2000–2012)
Han Seung-soo	89	South Korea	Saenuri	Prime Minister of South Korea (2008–2009)
François Hollande	72	France	PS	President of France (2012–2017)
Osvaldo Hurtado	87	Ecuador	Christian Democratic	President of Ecuador (1981–1984)
Hamadi Jebali	77	Tunisia	Ennahdha (until 2014) None (since 2014)	Head of Government of Tunisia (2011–2013)
Ellen Johnson Sirleaf	88	Liberia	None	President of Liberia (2006–2018)
Mehdi Jomaa	64	Tunisia	None (until 2017) Tunisian Alternative (since 2017)	Head of Government of Tunisia (2014–2015)
Ivo Josipović	69	Croatia	SDP	President of Croatia (2010–2015)
Alain Juppé	81	France	UMP	Prime Minister of France (1995–1997)
Milan Kučan	85	Slovenia; Yugoslavia	Communist (until 1990); None (since 1990)	President of Slovenia (1991–2002)
John Kufuor	87	Ghana	NPP	President of Ghana (2001–2009); Chairman of the AU (2007–2008)
Chandrika Kumaratunga	81	Sri Lanka	SLFP	President of Sri Lanka (1994–2005)
Aleksander Kwaśniewski	71	Poland	None (since 1995)	President of Poland (1995–2005)
Luis Alberto Lacalle	85	Uruguay	PN	President of Uruguay (1990–1995)
Ricardo Lagos	88	Chile	PPD	President of Chile (2000–2006)
Zlatko Lagumdžija	70	Bosnia and Herzegovina	Social Democratic	Chairman of the Council of Ministers of Bosnia and Herzegovina (2001–2002)
Lee Hong-koo	70	South Korea	NKP South Korea	Prime Minister of South Korea (1994–1995)
Yves Leterme	60	Belgium	CD&V	Prime Minister of Belgium (2009–2011)
Enrico Letta	60	Italy	PD	Prime Minister of Italy (2013–2014)
Doris Leuthard	63	Switzerland	CVP/PDC/PPD/PCD	Member of the Federal Council (2006–2018) (President in 2010 and 2017)
Thabo Mbeki	84	South Africa	ANC	President of South Africa (1999–2008)
Rexhep Meidani	82	Albania	Socialist	President of Albania (1997–2002)
Carlos Mesa	73	Bolivia	FRI	President of Bolivia (2003–2005)
James Michel	82	Seychelles	US	President of Seychelles (2004–2016)
Festus Mogae	87	Botswana	BDP	President of Botswana (1998–2008)
Mario Monti	83	Italy	None	Prime Minister of Italy (2011–2013)
Olusegun Obasanjo	89	Nigeria	PDP	Head of the Federal Military Government of Nigeria (1976–1979); President of Nigeria (1999–2007)
Roza Otunbayeva	76	Kyrgyzstan	Social Democratic (2007–2010)	President of Kyrgyzstan (2010–2011)
Anand Panyarachun	94	Thailand	None	Prime Minister of Thailand (1991–1992)
George Papandreou	74	Greece	Socialist	Prime Minister of Greece (2009–2011)
Andrés Pastrana	72	Colombia	Conservative	President of Colombia (1998–2002)
Pratibha Patil	91	India	INC	President of India (2007–2012)
P.J. Patterson	91	Jamaica	PNP (until 2011)	Prime Minister of Jamaica (1992–2006)
Romano Prodi	87	Italy	Democratic	President of the European Commission (1999–2004); President of the Council of Ministers of Italy (1996–1998, 2006–2008)
Jorge Quiroga	66	Bolivia	PODEMOS	President of Bolivia (2001–2002)
Iveta Radičová	69	Slovakia	SDKÚ-DS (2006–2012)	Prime Minister of Slovakia (2010–2012)
Mariano Rajoy	71	Spain	PP	President of the Government of Spain (2011–2018)
José Manuel Ramos-Horta	76	East Timor	None	Prime Minister of East Timor (2006–2007); President of East Timor (2007–2012; 2022–present)
Poul Nyrup Rasmussen	83	Denmark	Social Democrats	Prime Minister of Denmark (1993–2001)
Mary Robinson	82	Ireland	None	President of Ireland (1990–97); UN High Commissioner for Human Rights (1997–2002)
José Luis Rodríguez Zapatero	66	Spain	PSOE	President of the Government of Spain (2004–2011)
Petre Roman	80	Romania	FSN (1989–1991)	Prime Minister of Romania (1989–1991)
Kevin Rudd	69	Australia	ALP	Prime Minister of Australia (2007–2010, 2013)
Julio María Sanguinetti	90	Uruguay	PC	President of Uruguay (1985–1990, 1995–2000)
Wolfgang Schüssel	81	Austria	ÖVP	Chancellor of Austria (2000–2007)
Jenny Shipley	74	New Zealand	National	Prime Minister of New Zealand (1997–1999)
Jóhanna Sigurðardóttir	84	Iceland	Social Democratic Alliance	Prime Minister of Iceland (2009–2013)
Fuad Siniora	83	Lebanon	FM	Prime Minister of Lebanon (2005–2009)
Alexander Stubb	58	Finland	NCP	Prime Minister of Finland (2014–2015)
Hanna Suchocka	80	Poland	UD	Prime Minister of Poland (1992–1993)
Boris Tadić	68	Serbia	Social Democratic	President of Serbia (2004–2012)
Jigme Thinley	74	Bhutan	DPT	Prime Minister of Bhutan (2008–2013)
Helle Thorning-Schmidt	59	Denmark	Social Democrats	Prime Minister of Denmark (2011–2015)
Martín Torrijos	63	Panama	PRD	President of Panama (2004–2009)
Aminata Touré	64	Senegal	APR	Prime Minister of Senegal (2013–2014)
Tsakhiagiin Elbegdorj	63	Mongolia	Democratic Party	Prime Minister of Mongolia (2004–2006); President of Mongolia (2009–2017)
Danilo Türk	74	Slovenia	None	President of Slovenia (2007–2012)
Cassam Uteem	85	Mauritius	MMM	President of Mauritius (1992–2002)
Herman Van Rompuy	79	Belgium	CD&V	Prime Minister of Belgium (2008–2009); President of the European Council (2009–2014)
Guy Verhofstadt	73	Belgium	VLD	Prime Minister of Belgium (1999–2008)
Vaira Vīķe-Freiberga	88	Latvia	None	President of Latvia (1999–2007)
Susilo Bambang Yudhoyono	77	Indonesia	Democratic Party	President of Indonesia (2004–2014)
Ernesto Zedillo	74	Mexico	PRI	President of Mexico (1994–2000)
Moussa Mara	48	Mali	Change Party	Prime Minister of Mali (2014–2015)
Hilda Heine	72	Marshall Islands	Independent	President of the Marshall Islands (2016–2020; 2024–present)
Ram Nath Kovind	77	India	BJP	President of India (2017–2022)
Carlos Alvarado	43	Costa Rica	Citizens' Action Party	President of Costa Rica (2018–2022)
Mauricio Macri	64	Argentina	Republican Proposal	President of Argentina (2015–2019)
Francisco Sagasti	78	Peru	Purple Party	President of Peru (2020–2021)
Joachim Gauck	83	Germany	Independent	President of Germany (2012–2017)
Jean-Claude Juncker	68	Luxembourg	Christian Social People's Party	Prime Minister of Luxembourg (1995–2013) President of the European Commission (2014–2019)
Stefan Löfven	65	Sweden	Social Democratic Party	Prime Minister of Sweden (2014–2021)
Viktor Yushchenko	69	Ukraine	Our Ukraine	President of Ukraine (2005–2010)
Valdis Zatlers	68	Latvia	Reform Party	President of Latvia (2007–2011)
Cellou Dalein Diallo	73	Guinea	Union of Democratic Forces of Guinea	Prime Minister of Guinea (2004–2006)
Julia Gillard	63	Australia	Australian Labor Party	Prime Minister of Australia (2010–2013)
Alain Berset	53	Switzerland	Social Democratic Party of Switzerland	President of Switzerland (2018–2023)
Natalia Gavrilița	47	Moldova	Party of Action and Solidarity	Prime Minister of Moldova (2021–2023)
Mari Kiviniemi	56	Finland	Centre Party (Finland)	Prime Minister of Finland (2010–2011)
Sanna Marin	39	Finland	Social Democratic Party of Finland	Prime Minister of Finland (2019–2023)

=== List of secretaries-general ===
Name	Start	End	Nation	Party	Office(s) held
Antonio Álvarez-Couceiro	2002	2004	Spain		Co-founder of FRIDE
Kim Campbell	2004	2006	Canada	Conservative Party	Minister of National Defence (1993) Minister of Veterans Affairs (1993) Minister of Justice and Attorney General (1990-1993) Minister of State (Indian Affairs and Northern Development) (1989-1990) Prime Minister of Canada (1993)
Fernando Perpiñá-Robert	2006	2010	Spain		Spanish diplomat
Carlos Westendorp	2010	2016	Spain	PSOE	Minister of Foreign Affairs (1995–1996)
María Elena Agüero	2016	Present	United States	None	

=== List of honorary members ===
Name	Age	Nation	Party	Office(s) held
Aung San Suu Kyi	81	Myanmar	NLD	State Counsellor of Myanmar (2016–2021)
Ban Ki-moon	82	South Korea	None	Secretary-General of the United Nations (2007–2016)
Enrique V. Iglesias	96	Uruguay; Spain	PN	President of the Inter-American Development Bank (1998–2005); Secretary General of the Iberoamerican General Secretariat (2005–13)
Javier Solana	84	Spain	Socialist	Secretary General of NATO (1995–99) and High Representative of the EU for Foreign Affairs and Security Policy (1999–2009)
José Ángel Gurria	75	Mexico	PRI	Secretary General of OECD (2006–2021)
Juan Somavia	84	Chile	None	Director of the International Labour Organization (1999–2012)

=== List of members of the constituent foundations ===
Name	Age	Nation	Party	Office(s) held
Diego Hidalgo	84	Spain	(unknown)	Founder and President of, and donor to, Fundación para las Relaciones Internacionales y el Diálogo Exterior (FRIDE); Founding Member and Senior Fellow of the Gorbachev Foundation of North America (GFNA)
T. Anthony Jones	(unknown)	United States	None	Vice-president and executive director of GFNA
George Matthews	(unknown)	United States	None	Chairman and co-founder of GFNA
José Manuel Romero Moreno	86	Spain	None	Vice President of FRIDE
Cristina Manzano		Spain		Director of EsGlobal Member of FRIDE

=== List of former members (deceased) ===
Name	Died	Nation	Party	Office(s) held
Yasuo Fukuda	October 22, 2026 (aged 90)	Japan	Liberal Democratic	Prime Minister of Japan (2007–2008)
Horst Köhler	February 1, 2025 (aged 81)	Germany	CDU	President of Germany (2004–2010)
Punsalmaagiin Ochirbat	January 17, 2025 (aged 82)	Mongolia	MPP	President of Mongolia (1990–1997)
Jimmy Carter	December 29, 2024 (aged 100)	United States	Democratic	President of the United States (1977–81)
Sebastián Piñera	February 6, 2024 (aged 74)	Chile	None	President of Chile (2010–2014; 2018–2022)
John Bruton	February 6, 2024 (aged 76)	Ireland	Fine Gael	Taoiseach of Ireland (1994–1997)
Jacques Delors	December 27, 2023 (aged 98)	European Union; France	PS	President of the European Commission (1985–1995)
Fidel V. Ramos	July 31, 2022 (aged 94)	Philippines	Lakas	President of the Philippines (1992–1998)
Rupiah Banda	March 11, 2022 (aged 85)	Zambia	MMD	President of Zambia (2008–2011)
Jorge Sampaio	September 10, 2021 (aged 81)	Portugal	PS	President of Portugal (1996–2006)
Òscar Ribas Reig	December 18, 2020 (aged 84)	Andorra	AND	Prime Minister of Andorra (1990–1994)
Tabaré Vázquez	December 6, 2020 (aged 80)	Uruguay	PS	President of Uruguay (2005–2010, 2015–2020)
Sadiq al-Mahdi	November 26, 2020 (aged 84)	Sudan	Umma	Prime Minister of Sudan (1966–1967, 1986–1989)
Benjamin Mkapa	July 24, 2020 (aged 81)	Tanzania	CCM	President of Tanzania (1995–2005)
Abdurrahim El-Keib	April 21, 2020 (aged 70)	Libya	None	Acting Prime Minister of Libya (2011–2012)
Javier Pérez de Cuéllar	March 4, 2020 (aged 100)	Peru	UPP	Secretary-General of the United Nations (1982–1991); President of the Council of Ministers of Peru (2000–2001)
Bacharuddin Jusuf Habibie	September 11, 2019 (aged 83)	Indonesia	Golkar	President of Indonesia (1998–1999)
Belisario Betancur	December 7, 2018 (aged 95)	Colombia	Conservative	President of Colombia (1982–1986)
Wim Kok	October 20, 2018 (aged 80)	Netherlands	PvdA	Prime Minister of the Netherlands (1994–2002)
Kofi Annan	August 18, 2018 (aged 80)	Ghana	None	Secretary-General of the United Nations (1997–2006)
Álvaro Arzú	April 27, 2018 (aged 72)	Guatemala	Unionist	President of Guatemala (1996–2000); Mayor of Guatemala City (2004–2018)
Ruud Lubbers	February 14, 2018 (aged 78)	Netherlands	CDA	Prime Minister of the Netherlands (1982–1994); UN High Commissioner for Refugees (2001–2005)
Quett Masire	June 22, 2017 (aged 91)	Botswana	BDP	President of Botswana (1980–1998)
Helmut Kohl	June 16, 2017 (aged 87)	Germany; West Germany	CDU	Chancellor of West Germany (1982–1990); Chancellor of Germany (1990–1998)
James Mancham	January 8, 2017 (aged 77)	Seychelles	DP	President of Seychelles (1976–1977)
Mário Soares	January 7, 2017 (aged 92)	Portugal	PS	Prime Minister of Portugal (1976–1978, 1983–1985); President of Portugal (1986–1996)
António Mascarenhas Monteiro	September 16, 2016 (aged 72)	Cape Verde	MPD	President of Cape Verde (1991–2001)
Patricio Aylwin	April 19, 2016 (aged 87)	Chile	PDC	President of Chile (1990–1994)
Abd Al-Karim Al-Iryani	November 8, 2015 (aged 81)	Yemen; North Yemen	GPC	Prime Minister of North Yemen (1980–1983); Prime Minister of Yemen (1998–2001)
Adolfo Suárez	March 23, 2014 (aged 81)	Spain	MN (until 1977); UCD (1977–82)	President of the Government of Spain (1976–81)
Tadeusz Mazowiecki	October 28, 2013 (aged 86)	Poland; PR Poland	KO "S" (1980–91); UD (1991–94)	Prime Minister of Poland (1989–91)
Inder Kumar Gujral	November 30, 2012 (aged 92)	India	JD	Prime Minister of India (1997–98)
Václav Havel	December 18, 2011 (aged 75)	Czech Republic; Czechoslovakia	OF (1989–93); None (1993–2004)	President of Czechoslovakia (1989–92); President of the Czech Republic (1993–2003)
Ferenc Mádl	May 29, 2011 (aged 80)	Hungary	None	President of Hungary (2000–05)
Raúl Alfonsín	March 31, 2009 (aged 82)	Argentina	UCR	President of Argentina (1983–89)
Leopoldo Calvo-Sotelo	May 3, 2008 (aged 82)	Spain	UCD	President of the Government of Spain (1981–82)
Lennart Meri	March 14, 2006 (aged 76)	Estonia; Soviet Union	Isamaa (since 1992)	President of Estonia (1992–2001)
Valentín Paniagua	October 16, 2006 (aged 70)	Peru	AC	President of Peru (2000–01)

== See also ==
- CC9
