= Técnicas Reunidas =

Company

Técnicas Reunidas, S.A.

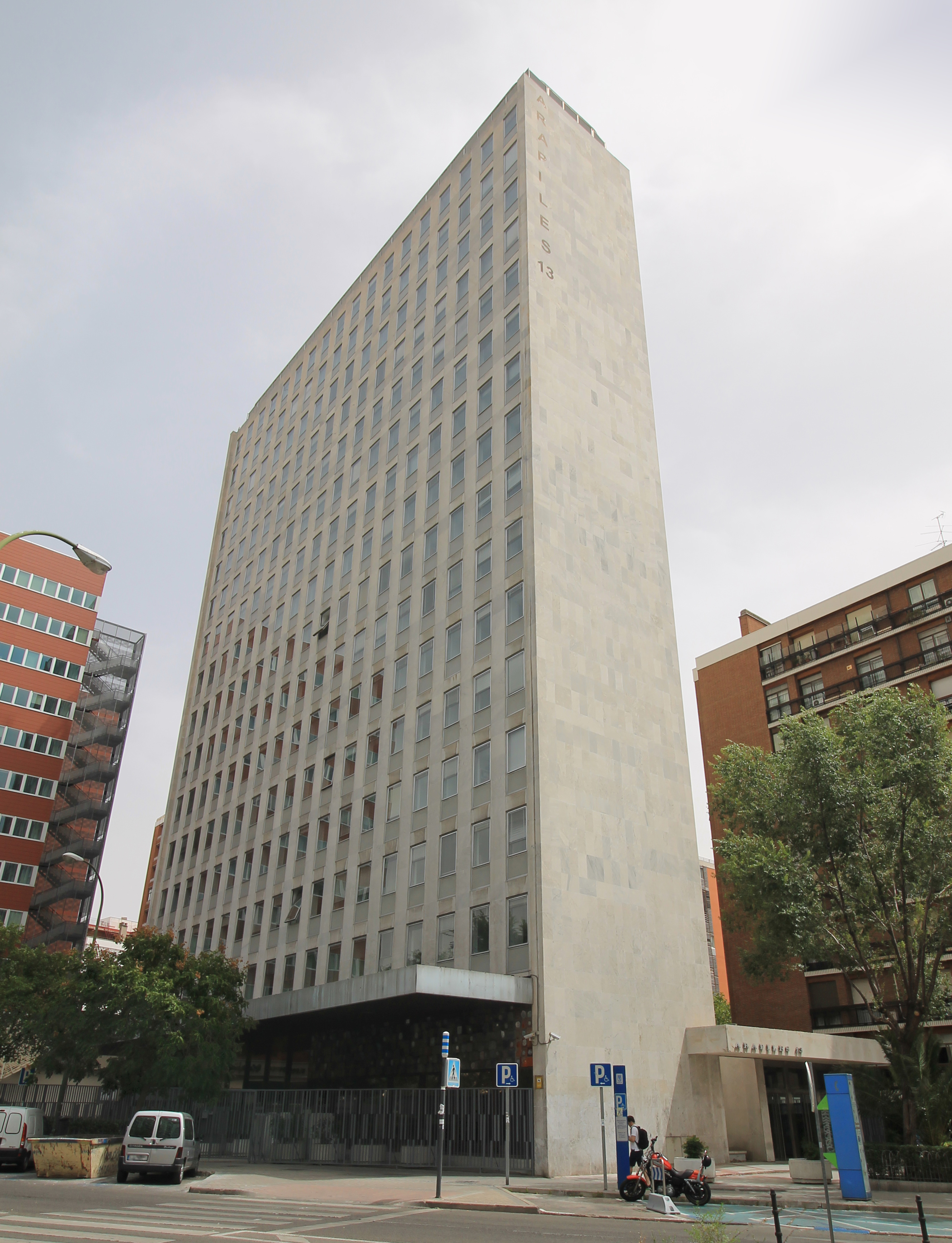
- Headquarters in Madrid, Spain
- Company type: Sociedad Anónima
- Traded as: BMAD: TRE; IBEX Medium Cap
- ISIN: ES0178165017
- Industry: Construction and engineering
- Founded: 1959
- Headquarters: Madrid, Spain
- Key people: Juan Lladó Arburúa (Chairman and CEO)
- Services: Design and construction of petrochemical facilities, power stations and industrial plants
- Revenue: ▲€4.699 billion (2019)
- Operating income: ▲€68.2 million (2019)
- Net income: ▲€110 million (2019)
- Total assets: ▲€4.280 billion (2019)
- Total equity: ▼€330 million (2019)
- Number of employees: 9,461 (2019)
- Website: www.tecnicasreunidas.es

Técnicas Reunidas, S.A. (Spanish pronunciation: [ˈteɣnikas rewˈniðas], meaning "Gathered Techniques"), or TRSA, is a Spanish-based general contractor which provides engineering, procurement and construction of industrial and power generation plants, particularly in the oil and gas sector.

TRSA is the primary holding company for a group of companies capable of providing several different integrated services for turnkey projects worldwide. Since 1959, the TRSA group of companies has designed and built over 1000 industrial plants worldwide. International projects account for 70% of the company's annual turnover, mainly in Latin America and China. The firm has also moved increasingly into the Middle East, and in January 2009 was awarded a $1.2 billion contract to develop two onshore fields in the UAE for a subsidiary of ADNOC.

== History ==
The origins of Técnicas Reunidas date back to 1959, when several Spanish businessmen and the US engineering company The Lummus Company joined forces to create Lummus Española, S.A.

In 1963, Técnicas Reunidas built its first complete refinery in Spain, thus beginning its career as a specialist in refining units.

In 1968, it built the Luján de Cuyo refinery in Argentina for YPF (Yacimientos Petrolíferos Fiscales, SA), its first project abroad.

In 1972, the company absorbed Tecniresa, adopting its current name and becoming a privately held Spanish company.

From the 1980s onwards, under the management of Álvaro García-Agulló Lladó and the chairmanship of José Lladó, the company underwent a major international expansion and currently carries out most of its activity outside Spain, mainly in the Middle East, Latin America, the Far East, and the Mediterranean area (primarily North Africa and Turkey).

In 2022, during the COVID-19 pandemic, the Spanish government, through the State Industrial Holdings Company (Sociedad Estatal de Participaciones Industriales), granted the company €340 million in aid.

== Organization ==
The business divisions of TRSA are oil and gas, power generation and infrastructures.

The areas of activity covered by TRSA's companies are: the petrochemical industry, heat transfer, cogeneration and renewable energies, fertilisers and inorganic chemistry, environmental engineering, iron and steel plants, metallurgy, mining and hydrometallurgy.

== Research and development ==
Since 1971, the company has its own research and development division. The company's R&D Centre, located in Madrid, Spain, is equipped with laboratory facilities and pilot and demonstration plants designed to be adapted to different process configurations. The R&D division develops new processes and the technological and economical improvement of existing ones, applying techniques and procedures of disciplines such as hydrometallurgy and electrochemistry. A fundamental objective is the upscaling from laboratory testing to industrial scale operations.

== See also ==
- List of oilfield service companies
