= Jose Manuel Romero Moreno =

Spanish lawyer and university professor

José Manuel Romero Moreno
- Born: June 11, 1940 (age 85); Madrid, Spain
- Education: Complutense University of Madrid
- Occupations: Lawyer, University Professor
- Title: Count of Fontao, Marquis of San Saturnino
- Awards: Knight of the Real Maestranza of Ronda

José Manuel Romero Moreno (Madrid, 11 June 1940) is a Spanish lawyer and university professor.

== Family and education ==
He is the son of stockbroker and musicologist Carlos Romero de Lecea and Pilar Moreno Uribe and grandson of Jose Moreno Osorio, count of Fontao and civil engineer. He did his elementary and secondary studies at the College of Areneros of Madrid. In 1959 he entered the Complutense University of Madrid. In his second year of college, he accompanied the Prince Juan Carlos de Borbon.

In 1981 he received his doctorate for his thesis entitled "Fundamental rights and procedural protections in the nineteenth century in Spanish".

== Career ==
He founded his law firm in 1991. It merged three years later with that of the former Minister Alberto Oliart.

In 1993 after his mother's death, he inherited the titles of Count of Fontao and Marquis of San Saturnino, continuing the family ties with the province of Lugo. That year King Juan Carlos appointed Romero as his Household's external legal counsel.

In 2004 he was appointed member of the board of directors of Patrimonio Nacional and Secretary of the Board of Real Instituto Elcano.

With the arrival of the new Monarch Felipe VI in 2014, he left the service of the Crown.

In 2015 he is appointed Chairman of SICPA Spain.

He is a Knight of the Real Maestranza of Ronda.

== Nóos case ==
In December 2011 the press discovered that, as private legal adviser to the King, Romero Moreno had been trying to force Inaki Urdangarin to cease his commercial activities linked to what later was called the Nóos case. His efforts were unsuccessful and Urdangarin continued his activities.

A year and a half later, he declared as a witness before the investigating judge describing his exact intervention in the matter. On 21 April 2016 it ended his involvement in the case declaring as a formal witness at the trial opened by this cause.

== Personal life ==
Romero Moreno married Ana María Duplá (divorced in 2017). Their children are:

- Carlos Romero Duplá (b. 1972) married to Marta Lladó Arburúa, daughter of former Minister José Lladó Fernández-Urrutia.
- José Romero Duplá (b. 1979) married to Patricia del Pozo Salinas.

== Sources ==
- Diccionario Biográfico Español. Real Academia de la Historia. Madrid 2014.
