= Manuel Arburúa de la Miyar =

Spanish politician (1902–1981)

Minister of Trade of Spain
- In office 19 July 1951 – 25 February 1957
- Prime Minister: Francisco Franco
- Preceded by: Juan Antonio Suanzes (Industry and Trade)
- Succeeded by: Alberto Ullastres

Personal details
- Born: Manuel Arburúa de la Miyar; 28 September 1902 Madrid, Kingdom of Spain
- Died: 17 December 1981 (aged 79) Madrid, Spain
- Party: Nonpartisan (National Movement)

Manuel Arburúa de la Miyar (28 September 1902 – 17 December 1981) was a Spanish politician who served as Minister of Trade of Spain between 1951 and 1957, during the Francoist dictatorship.

== Biography ==
From a family of Basque and Asturian descent, he was the son of Manuel Arburúa Dorronsoro, an employee of the Southern Railway Company who opened a tavern at 25 Infantas Street in Madrid, and his wife Amalia de la Miyar López.

He studied at the French Lycée in Madrid and then became a business teacher. His first important professional position was as director of foreign exchange at the Banco Exterior de España and later as director of the Centro de Contratación de Moneda (Currency Trading Center) from the time this institute was founded in 1931.

The Spanish Civil War caught him in Madrid, from where he moved to the rebel zone, where he served as an advisor to General Francisco Franco on monetary issues and was one of his most trusted men in the financial sphere.

In the post-war period, Arburúa was appointed undersecretary for Trade, Tariff Policy, and Currency where he developed an important policy to stabilize the peseta, obtain foreign currency, and increase exports at a particularly difficult time for the Spanish economy.

In 1942, he was appointed director of the Banco Exterior de España, a position he held until he was appointed by the dictator as Minister of Trade in 1951.

In this role, he worked intensively to open up the economy, laying the foundations for the abandonment of the regime's traditional autarky. More specifically, he promoted the free use of foreign currency, the abandonment of rationing, and the intensification of relations with the United States, with whom he signed the first trade cooperation agreement.

When he left the ministry in 1957, he returned to the Banco Exterior as president, a position he held until 1980.

He was a minister who promoted economic openness, taking the first steps towards the liberalization of the Spanish economy and opening it up to greater foreign trade. He was a Grand Cross of the Royal Order of Charles III.

An avid art collector, he assembled a collection of important paintings, including the Crucifixion by Juan de Flandes (now in the Prado Museum) and an Annunciation by Pedro Berruguete, on loan to the Bilbao Fine Arts Museum since May 2025.

== Personal life ==
He married Pilar Aspiunza and had one son José Manuel married to the Marchioness of Cortina and three daughters, Pilar married to business man José Lladó, Silvia married to Minister Marcelino Oreja, 1st Marquess of Oreja and Patricia married to Ignacio Domínguez Urquijo.
