= Regidor (disambiguation) =

A regidor is a council member of the municipal government in Spain and Latin America.

Regidor may also refer to:

- Regidor, Bolívar, a town and municipality of Colombia
- Estela Regidor (born 1970), Argentine politician
