= Aleksandr Nikitin (environmentalist) =

Russian environmentalist

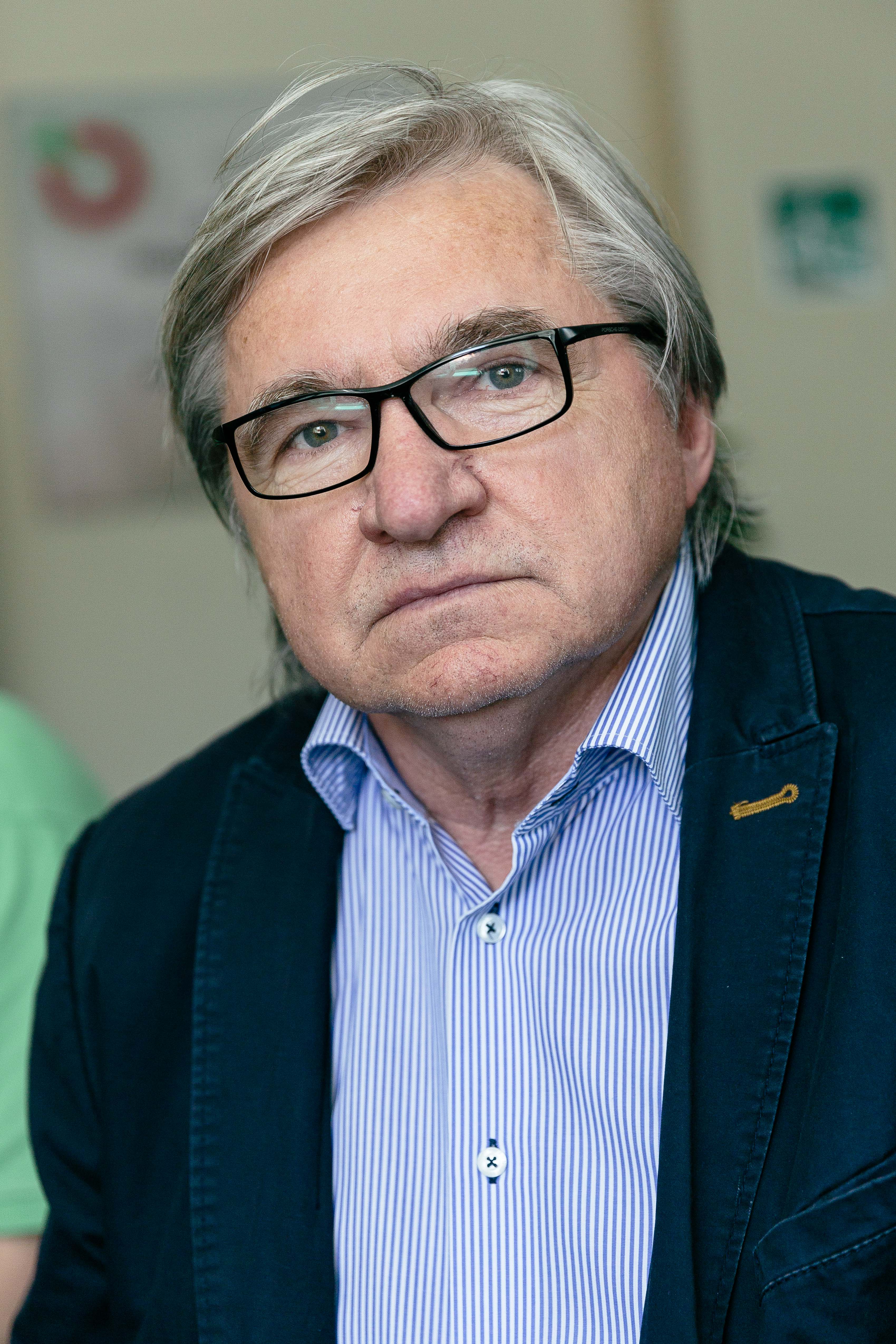

Alexander Konstantinovich Nikitin (Russian: Алекса́ндр Константи́нович Ники́тин; born 16 May 1952) is a Russian former submarine officer and nuclear safety inspector turned environmentalist. In 1996 he was accused of espionage for revealing the perils of decaying nuclear submarines, and in 2000 he became the first Russian to be completely acquitted of a charge of treason in the Soviet or post-Soviet era.

== Whistleblower and espionage accusations ==
Nikitin started to co-operate with Norwegian environmental Bellona Foundation in 1994. He was arrested in February 1996 by Russian FSB and charged with treason through espionage for his contributions to a Bellona report on the nuclear safety within the Russian Northern Fleet. On 30 August, Amnesty International declared him a prisoner of conscience and began an international campaign for his release. After having spent ten months in pre-trial detention in Saint Petersburg he was released on the order of Mikhail Katushev, the then deputy Russian Prosecutor General, in December 1996.

The charges were however, not dropped. Nikitin first stood trial in October 1998, when the Saint Petersburg City Court rejected the evidence against him. But rather than acquitting him, the Court sent the case back to the FSB for additional investigation. The Supreme Court of Russia confirmed this decision in February 1999, and the FSB filed new charges in July 1999.

The second trial started at the Saint Petersburg City Court in November 1999, and ended on 29 December with a full acquittal. The prosecution appealed to the Supreme Court, but the acquittal was confirmed and reached legal force on 17 April 2000. Nikitin was defended by a group of attorneys in law, including Yury Schmidt, Ivan Pavlov, Victor Drozdov, Henri Reznik and others.

The prosecution was, however, not willing to call it a day. On 30 May 2000 the Prosecutor General requested the governing body of the Russian Supreme Court, the Presidium, to re-open the case. The basis for the request was that “Nikitin's rights had been violated throughout the proceedings against him, and that these violations had to be repaired” (sic). The Presidium rejected the request on 13 September 2000.

Nikitin is still engaged in environmental and human rights issues in Russia. He is the head of Bellona Foundation’s Saint Petersburg branch, and is engaged in environmental and nuclear safety projects, as well as in human rights cases.

In 1997, Nikitin was awarded the Goldman Environmental Prize from the Goldman Environmental Foundation, but as a result of treason charges against him, he was prevented from attending the Prize ceremony.

Awards
Preceded by Kåre Willoch	Recipient of the Fritt Ord Award; 1998	Succeeded by NRK P2
