= Juan Antonio Suanzes =

Spanish politician (1891–1977)

Juan Antonio Suanzes Fernández

Minister of Industry and Trade of Spain
- In office 20 July 1945 – 19 July 1951
- Prime Minister: Francisco Franco
- Preceded by: Demetrio Carceller Segura
- Succeeded by: Joaquín Planell (Industry); Manuel Arburúa de la Miyar (Trade)
- In office 31 January 1938 – 9 August 1939
- Prime Minister: Francisco Franco
- Preceded by: Joaquín Bau
- Succeeded by: Luis Alarcón de la Lastra

Personal details
- Born: 20 May 1891 Ferrol, Coruña, Spain
- Died: 6 December 1977 (aged 86) Madrid, Spain
- Party: FET y de las JONS
- Occupation: Naval engineer

Juan Antonio Suanzes Fernández, 1st Marquess of Suanzes (20 May 1891 – 6 December 1977) was a Spanish naval engineer. Before the Spanish Civil War (1936–1939) he directed a shipyard. During the civil war he offered his services to the Nationalist side, and was made Minister of Industry and Trade from 1938 to 1939. He was again Minister of Industry and Commerce from 1945 to 1951. He was a member of FET y de las JONS.

== Early years (1891–1936) ==
Juan Antonio Suanzes Fernández was born in Ferrol, Coruña, on 20 May 1891. He was the oldest of six children in a family with naval traditions. His father, Saturnino Sunazes Carpegna, belonged to the General Corps of the navy. He attended a religious school for his early education. At the age of 12 he entered the naval school in Ferrol. He was promoted to midshipman (1906), frigate ensign (1908) and navy Ensign (1909). At times he was assigned to ships such as the armoured frigate Numancia, the battleship Pelayo, and the armored cruisers Emperador Carlos V and Reina Regente. In 1913 he was appointed as a lieutenant to the battleship España.

In 1915 Suanzes began to study naval engineering in Ferrol. In 1917 he was a captain of naval engineers, and a teacher at the Naval Military School of San Fernando in Cadiz. In 1920 he was named director of the Cartagena shipyard of the Sociedad Española de Construcción Naval (SECN, Spanish Society of Naval Construction). He was appointed commander of engineers in 1921. In 1922 he was made a supernumerary of the navy so he could devote himself to his work for the private company. He was in charge of the SECN shipyard at Cartagena until 1926, then was transferred to run the shipyard in Ferrol. In January 1932 he moved to Madrid with his family. In Madrid he was Inspector General of Construction for the company. A profound patriot, he became increasingly disturbed at the British ownership position in the SECN, which he felt was trying to prevent it from evolving into an independent Spanish operation.

In 1934 Suanzes left the SECN due to what he called the "intolerable interference of the English", referring to Vickers, one of the SECN proprietors. He created a small company named Estudios, Proyectos y Reparaciones (EPYR), then obtained the position of Director General of Boetticher y Navarro, S.A. (BYNSA).

== Civil War (1936–1939) ==
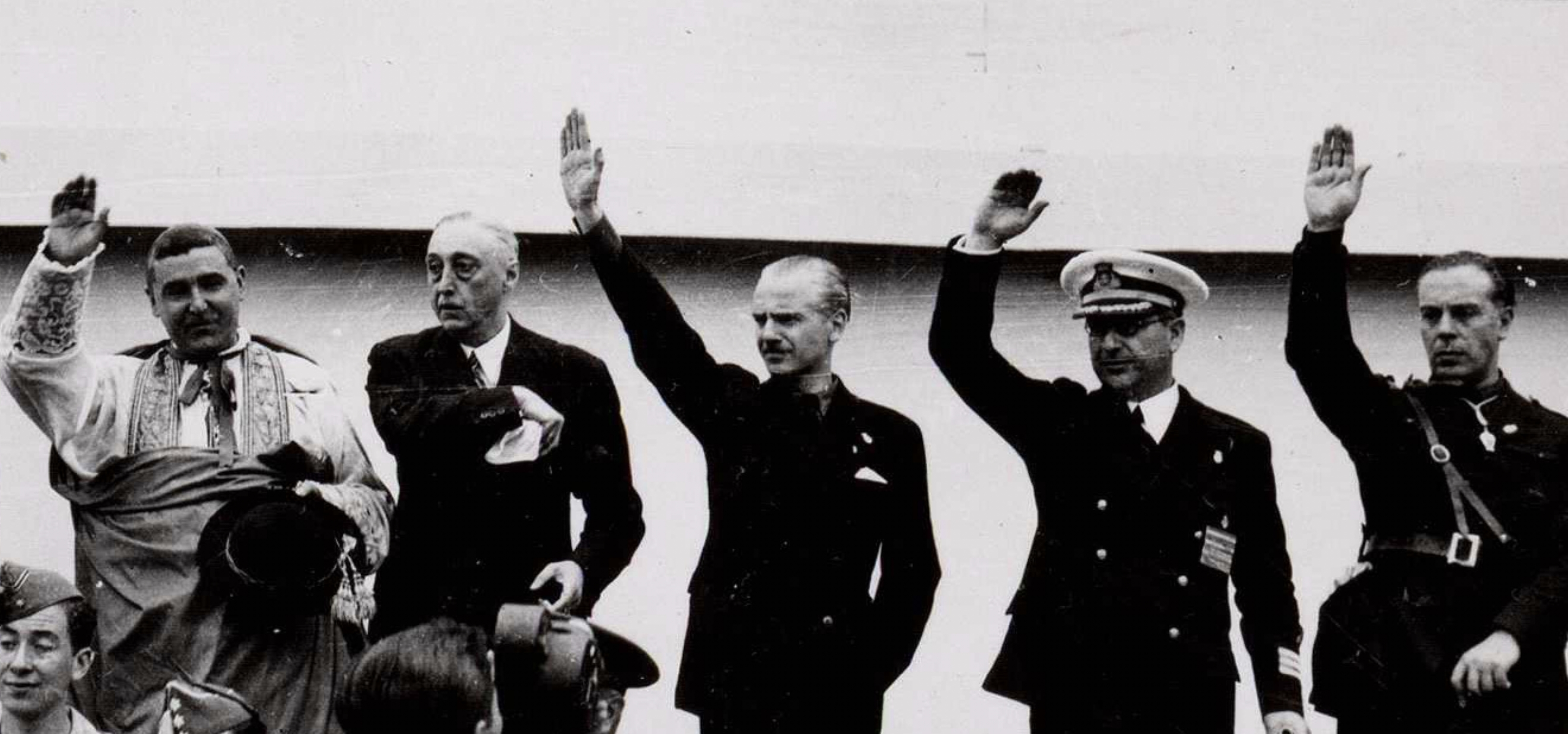
Suanzes (on the right) celebrating the first anniversary of the liberation of Bilbao on 19 June 1938.

At the start of the Spanish Civil War (1936–1939) BYNSA was taken over by the Ministry of Defense. In late October 1936 Suanzes took refuge in the Polish embassy. He left there in March 1937 and traveled via Valencia, Marseille and San Sebastián to Salamanca, where he placed himself at the disposal of General Francisco Franco. Suanzes was named colonel of naval engineers in charge of salvage. In June 1937 he was in Rome, where he asked Admiral Odoardo Somigli to help refurbish the Spanish naval vessels. His request was refused at first, but Benito Mussolini intervened and Suanzes was able to get a series of ships overhauled and rearmed by the Italians. Franco appointed him Minister of Industry and Commerce on 31 January 1938. The ministry was based in Bilbao, and the main task was recovery of industries in the areas that were coming under the control of the Nationalist forces. On 9 August 1939 he was replaced in a cabinet reshuffle by Luis Alarcón de Lastra.

== Later career (1939–1977) ==
The law of 1 September 1939 created the Office of Construction and of Naval Military Industries in the Ministry of the Navy. On 23 September 1939 Suanzes was made head of this organization, and became a member of the National Defense Council. His goal was to end existing contracts with the navy and start a new organization responsible for naval military construction. The Minister of the Navy, Salvador Moreno Fernández, delayed all his projects. He resigned in July 1941. The Instituto Nacional de Industria (INI, National Institute of Industry) was created on 25 September 1941, and on 17 October 1941 Suanzes was named president of the institute. It was inspired by the Istituto per la Ricostruzione Industriale of Fascist Italy. Suanzes was appointed Minister of Industry and Commerce on 20 July 1945, while remaining president of the INI. He held office as Minister until 19 July 1951, when he was replaced in a cabinet shuffle by Joaquín Planell Riera (Industry) and Manuel Arburúa de la Miyar (Commerce). He remained president of the INI until 1963, when Franco accepted his resignation.

Although working in the INI, Suanzes remained a naval officer and became a Brigadier General in 1950. In 1940 he became a member of the Consejo Superior de Investigaciones Científicas (CSIC, High Council for Scientific Research). He became a member of the board of Juan de la Cierva, and was named president of this company in 1942, holding that position for over twenty years. In 1956 he was appointed the first president of the Escuela de Organización Industrial (EOI, School of Industrial Organization), holding office until 1963. In 1956 he was appointed first president of the Spanish National Committee of the World Energy Conference, a position he held for the remainder of his life.

In 1960 Franco granted Suanzes and his heirs the title of Marquess of Suanzes. In 1963 he resigned from the INI and withdrew from all public activity. He died in Madrid on 6 December 1977 at the age of 86.

== Posthumous recognition ==
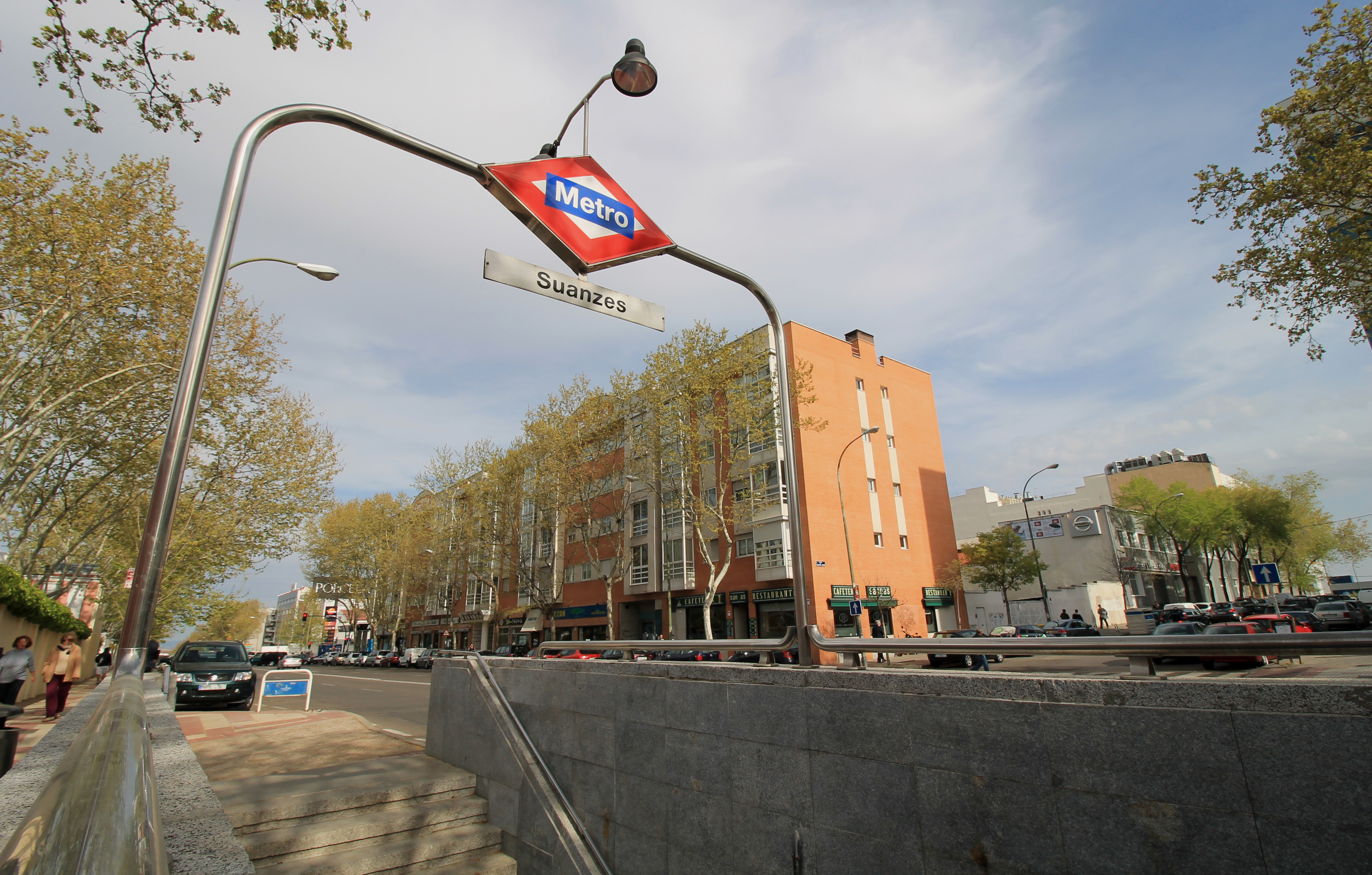
Entrance to the Suanzes metro station

An area in the neighborhood of San Blas (Madrid) was established for INI industries and their workers. In that ares, a square, a primary school, a secondary school and the Suanzes metro station were named after Suanzes. In 2022, the Democratic Memory Law abolished the title of Marquis of Suanzes.

== Publications ==
- Juan Antonio Suanzes; Instituto Nacional de Industria (Spain) (1956). Es preciso acelerar el proceso de la evolución económica. Instituto Nacional de Industria. p. 44.
- Juan Antonio Suanzes (1963). 8 discursos. Centro de Estudios Económicos y Sociales del Instituto Nacional de Industria. p. 217.

== Sources ==
- Arco Blanco, Miguel Ángel del (2012-07-12). "Juan Antonia Suanzes: Industry, Fascism and Catholicism". Right-Wing Spain in the Civil War Era: Soldiers of God and Apostles of the Fatherland, 1914–45. Bloomsbury Publishing. ISBN 978-1-4411-1479-2.
- El País (1977-12-07). "Ha fallecido Juan Antonio Suances". El País (in Spanish).
- Laruelo, Elena; Sisniega, Ana (2011). "Historia de un archivo particular: El fondo documental de Juan Antonio Suanzes" (PDF) (in Spanish). Sociedad Estatal de Participaciones Industriales (SEPI).
- Real Academia de Ciencias (2015). "Excmo. Sr. D. JUAN ANTONIO SUANZES FERNÁNDEZ" (in Spanish). Archived from the original on 2015-01-28.
- Urquijo y Goitia (2008). Gobiernos y ministros españoles en la edad contemporánea. Editorial CSIC - CSIC Press. ISBN 978-84-00-08737-1.
