= FRIDE =

Former European think tank

- Formation: 1999
- Dissolved: 31 December 2015
- Type: International Development Think Tank
- Location(s): Madrid Brussels
- President: Pedro Solbes
- Website: Official website

The FRIDE (Fundación para las Relaciones Internacionales y el Diálogo Exterior, Spanish for "Foundation for International Relations and Foreign Dialogue") was an independent European think tank headquartered in Madrid and Brussels. As of 2012, it was one of 55 think tanks in the country. It focused on the improvement of European views and ideas on various topics related to international development. It ceased its activities on 31 December 2015 due to lack of funding.

== History ==
The think tank was founded by Diego Hidalgo in 1999. Hidalgo is also the founder of another think tank, Club of Rome, and other similar organizations. FRIDE later became part of the European Think Tanks Group which also includes the German Development Institute, European Center for Development Policy Management and the Overseas Development Institute.

In 2012, FRIDE was the 77th organization among top 100 non-US think tanks and the 75th among top 150 worldwide think tanks according to the global go to think tanks ranking developed by the international relations program of the University of Pennsylvania. In the same ranking, it was the 23rd Western Europe think tank among 75 institutions.

FRIDE closed in December 2015.

== Objectives and fields of study ==
The stated objective of the FRIDE was to expand the ideas on Europe's role in the international arena with special reference to multilateralism, democratic values, security and sustainable development. It was an international development think tank. Its major study fields includes democracy, emerging powers, development cooperation, global governance, fragile states and energy security. In addition, it focused on peace and security, human rights, democracy promotion, and development and humanitarian aid. The specialization of FRIDE was on crisis and EU foreign policy, Europe and the reshaped global order, changing approaches to security and the new Middle East.

== Organizational structure ==
The organization had a president, a director a deputy director, a board of trustees, and an advisory committee. Pedro Solbes was the president and Giovanni Grevi the director of the organization.

== Activities ==
FRIDE generally realized its activities through publications, research programs and events. The FRIDE publications were policy briefs, opinion articles in the newspapers and working papers developed by its research team and also, publishes books. In addition, FRIDE organized projects, studies and analyses.

In 2010, the Club of Madrid and FRIDE functioned as the advisor bodies for the G20 summit held in Seoul. Its studies in the period of 2011–2012 were the 26th best policy report according to the global go to think tanks ranking.

== Funders ==
FRIDE's major financial source was private donors and projects. In 2010, EU funding was just 0.68% of its revenues of €2.47 million. The Madrid regional government contributed to FRIDE from 2008.
