= John Cunningham Wood =

Australian economist and author (born 1952)

John Cunningham Wood (born 1952) is an Australian economist, author, and the chief executive officer of the University Division at Navitas, known as series editor of the "Critical Assessment of Leading Economists" series of Taylor & Francis.

== Biography ==
Wood received his BE (hons) with first class honours in economics from the University of Western Australia and his D.Phil. from the University of Oxford.

Wood started his career as an academic in Australia at the University of New England. He later worked for State and Federal Governments which included the position of Speech Writer to the Prime Minister and later as economist for Ernst & Young in the 1980s. In 1994 he was appointed Hughes Professor of Business at the University of Notre Dame, Australia.

He was affiliated with the Edith Cowan University, where he was the Deputy Vice Chancellor. In 2007 he was appointed chief executive officer of University Programs to the global education provider Navitas.

== Selected publications ==
- Wood, John Cunningham. Thomas Robert Malthus, Critical Assessments. Vol. 1. Routledge Kegan & Paul, 1986.
- Wood, John Cunningham, ed. Karl Marx's economics: critical assessments. Vol. 1. Psychology Press, 1988.
- Wood, John Cunningham, ed. William Stanley Jevons: Critical Assessments. Vol. 1. Routledge, 1988.
- Wood, John Cunningham, ed. JA Schumpeter: critical assessments. Vol. 4. Taylor & Francis, 1991.
- Wood, John Cunningham, ed. Adam Smith: critical assessments. Vol. 3. Taylor & Francis, 1993.
- Wood, John Cunningham, ed. Alfred Marshall: critical assessments. Taylor & Francis, 1993.
- Wood, John Cunningham, ed. John Maynard Keynes, Critical Assessment: Second Series. Psychology Press, 1994.
- Wood, John Cunningham, and Robert D. Wood, eds. Friedrich A. Von Hayek. Vol. 1. Taylor & Francis, 2004.
