= Sixth government of Francisco Franco =

6th government of Francisco Franco
- Government of Spain
- 1962–1965
- 1966 portrait of Franco
- Date formed: 11 July 1962
- Date dissolved: 8 July 1965

People and organisations
- Head of State: Francisco Franco
- Prime Minister: Francisco Franco
- Deputy Prime Minister: Agustín Muñoz Grandes
- No. of ministers: 19 (Note: Does not include the prime minister.)
- Total no. of members: 20
- Member party: FET–JONS
- Status in legislature: One-party state

History
- Legislature terms: 7th Cortes Españolas; 8th Cortes Españolas
- Budget: 1964–65
- Predecessor: Franco V
- Successor: Franco VII

The sixth (Note: Sources differ on the numbering, depending on whether they consider every cabinet change or just major reshuffles as giving way to a different government. In this sense, the 1962–1965 period is regarded as both the sixth and the eleventh government under Franco, depending on the source.) government of Francisco Franco was formed on 11 July 1962. It succeeded the fifth Franco government and was the government of Spain from 11 July 1962 to 8 July 1965, a total of 1,093 days, or 2 years, 11 months and 27 days.

Franco's sixth cabinet was made up of members from the different factions or "families" within the National Movement: mainly the FET y de las JONS party—the only legal political party during the Francoist regime—the military, the Opus Dei and the National Catholic Association of Propagandists (ACNP), as well as a number of aligned-nonpartisan technocrats or figures from the civil service.

== Council of Ministers ==
The Council of Ministers was structured into the offices for the prime minister, the deputy prime minister and 18 ministries, including two ministers without portfolio and the office of the minister undersecretary of the presidency.

← Franco VI Government → (11 July 1962 – 8 July 1965)
Portfolio	Name	Party	Took office	Left office	Ref.
Head of State; Prime Minister	Francisco Franco	Military	30 January 1938	9 June 1973	
Deputy Prime Minister	Agustín Muñoz Grandes	Military	11 July 1962	28 July 1967	
Minister of Foreign Affairs	Fernando María Castiella	FET–JONS^{/ACNP}	25 February 1957	30 October 1969	
Minister of Justice	Antonio Iturmendi	FET–JONS^{/Trad.}	19 July 1951	8 July 1965	
Minister of the Army	Pablo Martín Alonso	Military	11 July 1962	11 February 1964†	
Minister of the Navy	Pedro Nieto Antúnez	Military	11 July 1962	30 October 1969	
Minister of Finance	Mariano Navarro Rubio	Opus Dei	25 February 1957	8 July 1965	
Minister of Governance	Camilo Alonso Vega	Military	25 February 1957	30 October 1969	
Minister of Public Works	Jorge Vigón	Military	25 February 1957	8 July 1965	
Minister of National Education	Manuel Lora-Tamayo	Nonpartisan	11 July 1962	2 June 1966	
Minister of Labour	Jesús Romeo Gorría	FET–JONS	11 July 1962	30 October 1969	
Minister of Industry	Gregorio López-Bravo	Opus Dei	11 July 1962	30 October 1969	
Minister of Agriculture	Cirilo Cánovas	FET–JONS	25 February 1957	8 July 1965	
Minister of the Air	José Lacalle Larraga	Military	11 July 1962	30 October 1969	
Minister of Trade	Alberto Ullastres	Opus Dei	25 February 1957	8 July 1965	
Minister of Information and Tourism	Manuel Fraga	FET–JONS	11 July 1962	30 October 1969	
Minister of Housing	José María Martínez Sánchez-Arjona	FET–JONS	21 April 1960	30 October 1969	
Minister Undersecretary of the Presidency	Luis Carrero Blanco	Military	19 July 1951	22 September 1967	
Minister Secretary-General of the Movement	José Solís Ruiz	FET–JONS	25 February 1957	30 October 1969	
Minister without portfolio President of the Council of National Economy	Pedro Gual Villalbí	Nonpartisan	25 February 1957	8 July 1965	
=== Changes February 1964 ===
Portfolio	Name	Faction	Took office	Left office	Ref.
Minister of the Army	Pedro Nieto Antúnez took on the ordinary discharge of duties from 11 to 21 February 1964.				
Minister of the Army	Camilo Menéndez Tolosa	Military	21 February 1964	30 October 1969	

== Departmental structure ==
Francisco Franco's sixth government was organised into several superior and governing units, whose number, powers and hierarchical structure varied depending on the ministerial department.

Unit/body rank

- (■) Undersecretary
- (■) Director-general
- (◆) Military & intelligence agency

Office (Original name)	Portrait	Name	Took office	Left office	Alliance/party	Ref.
=== Prime Minister's Office ===
Prime Minister (Presidencia del Gobierno)		Francisco Franco	30 January 1938	9 June 1973	FET–JONS (Military)	
Deputy Prime Minister (Vicepresidencia del Gobierno)		Agustín Muñoz Grandes	11 July 1962	28 July 1967	FET–JONS (Military)	
Minister Undersecretary of the Presidency (Ministro Subsecretario de la Presidencia)		Luis Carrero Blanco	19 July 1951	9 June 1973	FET–JONS (Military)	
=== Ministry of Foreign Affairs ===
Ministry of Foreign Affairs (Ministerio de Asuntos Exteriores)		Fernando María Castiella	25 February 1957	30 October 1969	FET–JONS (also a member of ACNP)	
Ministry of Foreign Affairs (Ministerio de Asuntos Exteriores)	18 October 1957 – 17 April 1964: (■) Undersecretariat of Foreign Affairs; (■) Directorate-General for Foreign Policy; (■) Directorate-General for Cultural Relations; (■) Directorate-General for Internal Regime; (■) Directorate-General for Consular Affairs; (■) Directorate-General for Economic Relations; (■) Directorate-General for International Organizations; (■) Directorate-General of the Office for Diplomatic Information; (■) Service for Chancery, Protocol and Orders–Introducer of Ambassadors; (■) Inspectorate-General for Services Abroad; 17 April 1964 – 25 April 1966: (■) Undersecretariat of Foreign Affairs; (■) Directorate-General for Foreign Policy; (■) Directorate-General for Cultural Relations; (■) Directorate-General for Internal Regime; (■) Directorate-General for Consular Affairs; (■) Directorate-General for Economic Relations; (■) Directorate-General for International Organizations; (■) Directorate-General of the Office for Diplomatic Information; (■) Directorate-General for Relations with the United States of America; (■) Service for Chancery, Protocol and Orders–Introducer of Ambassadors; (■) Inspectorate-General for Services Abroad					
=== Ministry of Justice ===
Ministry of Justice (Ministerio de Justicia)		Antonio Iturmendi	19 July 1951	8 July 1965	FET–JONS (Traditionalist)	
=== Ministry of the Army ===
Ministry of the Army (Ministerio del Ejército)		Pablo Martín Alonso	11 July 1962	11 February 1964 (died in office)	FET–JONS (Military)	
Ministry of the Army (Ministerio del Ejército)		Pedro Nieto Antúnez (ordinary discharge of duties)	11 February 1964	21 February 1964	FET–JONS (Military)	
Ministry of the Army (Ministerio del Ejército)		Camilo Menéndez Tolosa	21 February 1964	30 October 1969	FET–JONS (Military)	
=== Ministry of the Navy ===
Ministry of the Navy (Ministerio de Marina)		Pedro Nieto Antúnez	11 July 1962	30 October 1969	FET–JONS (Military)	
=== Ministry of Finance ===
Ministry of Finance (Ministerio de Hacienda)		Mariano Navarro Rubio	25 February 1957	8 July 1965	FET–JONS (Opus Dei)	
=== Ministry of Governance ===
Ministry of Governance (Ministerio de la Gobernación)		Camilo Alonso Vega	25 February 1957	30 October 1969	FET–JONS (Military)	
=== Ministry of Public Works ===
Ministry of Public Works (Ministerio de Obras Públicas)		Jorge Vigón	25 February 1957	8 July 1965	FET–JONS (Military)	
=== Ministry of National Education ===
Ministry of National Education (Ministerio de Educación Nacional)		Manuel Lora-Tamayo	11 July 1962	17 April 1968	FET–JONS (Nonpartisan)	
=== Ministry of Labour ===
Ministry of Labour (Ministerio de Trabajo)		Jesús Romeo Gorría	11 July 1962	30 October 1969	FET–JONS	
=== Ministry of Industry ===
Ministry of Industry (Ministerio de Industria)		Gregorio López-Bravo	11 July 1962	30 October 1969	FET–JONS (Opus Dei)	
=== Ministry of Agriculture ===
Ministry of Agriculture (Ministerio de Agricultura)		Cirilo Cánovas	25 February 1957	8 July 1965	FET–JONS	
=== Ministry of the Air ===
Ministry of the Air (Ministerio del Aire)		José Lacalle Larraga	11 July 1962	30 October 1969	FET–JONS (Military)	
=== Ministry of Trade ===
Ministry of Trade (Ministerio de Comercio)		Alberto Ullastres	25 February 1957	8 July 1965	FET–JONS (Opus Dei)	
=== Ministry of Information and Tourism ===
Ministry of Information and Tourism (Ministerio de Información y Turismo)		Manuel Fraga	11 July 1962	30 October 1969	FET–JONS	
=== Ministry of Housing ===
Ministry of Housing (Ministerio de la Vivienda)		José María Martínez; Sánchez-Arjona	21 April 1960	30 October 1969	FET–JONS	
=== Ministers without portfolio ===
Minister Secretary-General of FET–JONS (Ministro Secretario General de FET y de las JONS)		José Solís Ruiz	25 February 1957	30 October 1969	FET–JONS	
Minister without portfolio; President of the Council of National Economy (Ministro sin cartera; Presidente del Consejo de Economía Nacional)		Pedro Gual Villalbí	25 February 1957	8 July 1965	FET–JONS (Nonpartisan)	

== Bibliography ==
- Ynfante, Jesús (1970). "Capítulo II: Las bases de reclutamiento. 3. El Opus Dei en la enseñanza superior". La prodigiosa aventura del Opus Dei. Génesis y desarrollo de la Santa Mafia (in Spanish). Ruedo ibérico.
- Sánchez Recio, Glicerio (2013). "Familias políticas, estructuras de poder, instituciones del régimen". In Ruiz Carnicer, Miguel Ángel (ed.). Falange, las culturas políticas del fascismo en la España de Franco (1936-1975) (in Spanish). Vol. 1. Clarendon Press, University of Oxford. pp. 217–229. ISBN 978-84-9911-216-9.

Preceded by Franco V	Government of Spain; 1962–1965	Succeeded by Franco VII
