= Fifth government of Francisco Franco =

5th government of Francisco Franco
- Government of Spain
- 1957–1962
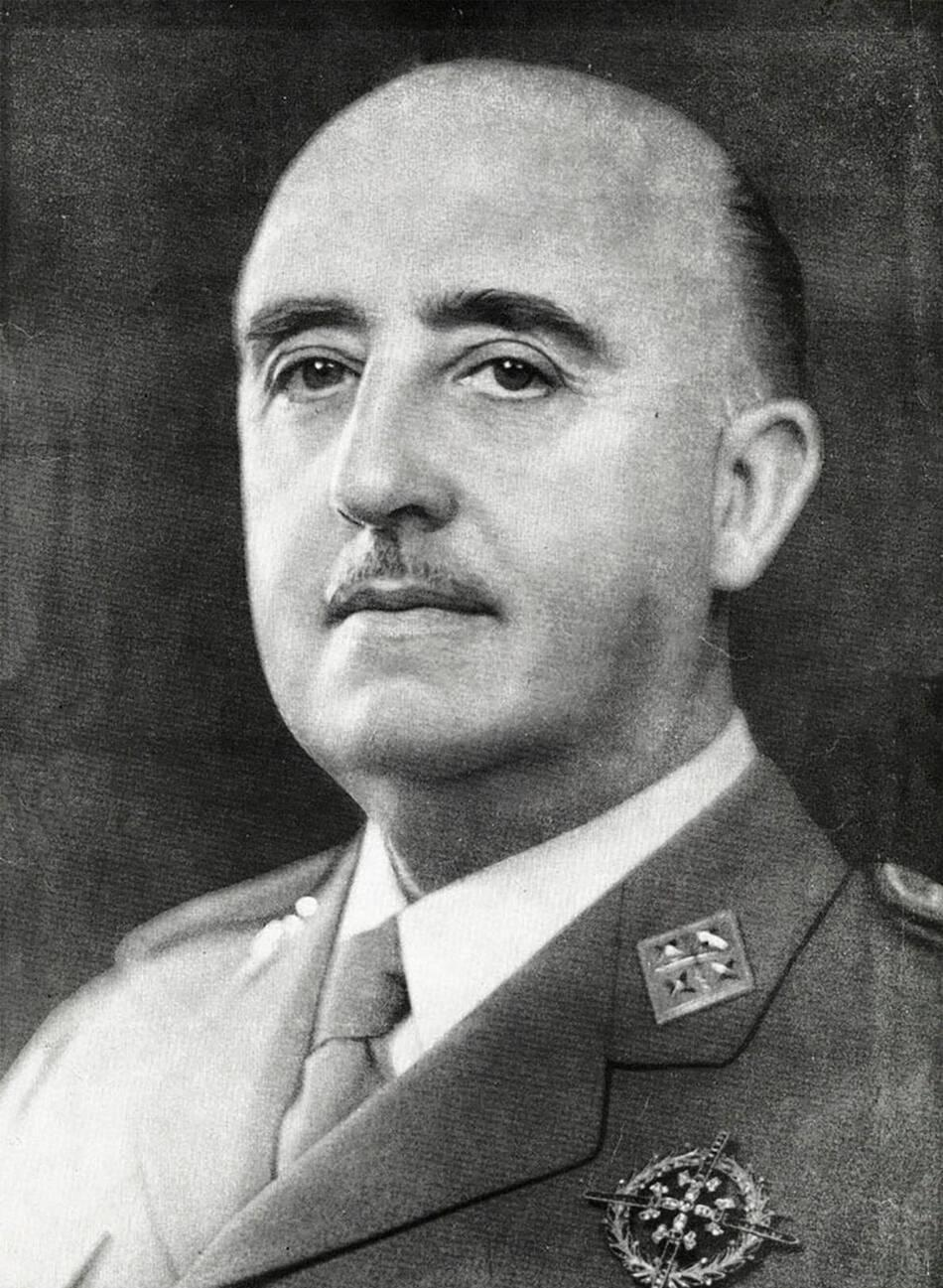
- Franco in the 1950s
- Date formed: 25 February 1957
- Date dissolved: 11 July 1962

People and organisations
- Head of State: Francisco Franco
- Prime Minister: Francisco Franco
- No. of ministers: 18 (Note: Does not include the prime minister.)
- Total no. of members: 19
- Member party: FET–JONS
- Status in legislature: One-party state

History
- Legislature terms: 5th Cortes Españolas; 6th Cortes Españolas; 7th Cortes Españolas
- Budget: 1958–59, 1960–61, 1962–63
- Predecessor: Franco IV
- Successor: Franco VI

The fifth (Note: Sources differ on the numbering, depending on whether they consider every cabinet change or just major reshuffles as giving way to a different government. In this sense, the 1957–1962 period is regarded as both the fifth and the tenth government under Franco, depending on the source.) government of Francisco Franco was formed on 25 February 1957. It succeeded the fourth Franco government and was the government of Spain from 25 February 1957 to 11 July 1962, a total of 1,962 days, or 5 years, 4 months and 16 days.

Franco's fifth cabinet was made up of members from the different factions or "families" within the National Movement: mainly the FET y de las JONS party—the only legal political party during the Francoist regime—the military, the National Catholic Association of Propagandists (ACNP) and a number of aligned-nonpartisan figures from the civil service; however for the first time, the cabinet would see the incorporation of several technocratic ministers from the Opus Dei. The new government saw the establishment for the first time of a Ministry of Housing.

== Council of Ministers ==
The Council of Ministers was structured into the office for the prime minister and 18 ministries, including one minister without portfolio and the office of the minister undersecretary of the presidency.

← Franco V Government → (25 February 1957 – 11 July 1962)
Portfolio	Name	Party	Took office	Left office	Ref.
Head of State; Prime Minister	Francisco Franco	Military	30 January 1938	9 June 1973	
Minister of Foreign Affairs	Fernando María Castiella	FET–JONS^{/ACNP}	25 February 1957	30 October 1969	
Minister of Justice	Antonio Iturmendi	FET–JONS^{/Trad.}	19 July 1951	8 July 1965	
Minister of the Army	Antonio Barroso Sánchez-Guerra	Military	25 February 1957	11 July 1962	
Minister of the Navy	Felipe José Abárzuza	Military	25 February 1957	11 July 1962	
Minister of Finance	Mariano Navarro Rubio	Opus Dei	25 February 1957	8 July 1965	
Minister of Governance	Camilo Alonso Vega	Military	25 February 1957	30 October 1969	
Minister of Public Works	Jorge Vigón	Military	25 February 1957	8 July 1965	
Minister of National Education	Jesús Rubio García-Mina	FET–JONS	15 February 1956	11 July 1962	
Minister of Labour	Fermín Sanz-Orrio	FET–JONS	25 February 1957	11 July 1962	
Minister of Industry	Joaquín Planell	Military	19 July 1951	11 July 1962	
Minister of Agriculture	Cirilo Cánovas	FET–JONS	25 February 1957	8 July 1965	
Minister of the Air	José Rodríguez y Díaz de Lecea	Military	25 February 1957	11 July 1962	
Minister of Trade	Alberto Ullastres	Opus Dei	25 February 1957	8 July 1965	
Minister of Information and Tourism	Gabriel Arias-Salgado	FET–JONS	19 July 1951	11 July 1962	
Minister of Housing	José Luis de Arrese	FET–JONS	25 February 1957	18 March 1960	
Minister Undersecretary of the Presidency	Luis Carrero Blanco	Military	19 July 1951	22 September 1967	
Minister Secretary-General of the Movement	José Solís Ruiz	FET–JONS	25 February 1957	30 October 1969	
Minister without portfolio President of the Council of National Economy	Pedro Gual Villalbí	Nonpartisan	25 February 1957	8 July 1965	
=== Changes March 1960 ===
Portfolio	Name	Faction	Took office	Left office	Ref.
Minister of Housing	Pedro Gual Villalbí took on the ordinary discharge of duties from 18 March to 21 April 1960.				
Minister of Housing	José María Martínez Sánchez-Arjona	FET–JONS	21 April 1960	30 October 1969	

== Departmental structure ==
Francisco Franco's fifth government was organised into several superior and governing units, whose number, powers and hierarchical structure varied depending on the ministerial department.

Unit/body rank

- (■) Undersecretary
- (■) Director-general
- (◆) Military & intelligence agency

Office (Original name)	Portrait	Name	Took office	Left office	Alliance/party	Ref.
=== Prime Minister's Office ===
Prime Minister (Presidencia del Gobierno)		Francisco Franco	30 January 1938	9 June 1973	FET–JONS (Military)	
Minister Undersecretary of the Presidency (Ministro Subsecretario de la Presidencia)		Luis Carrero Blanco	19 July 1951	9 June 1973	FET–JONS (Military)	
=== Ministry of Foreign Affairs ===
Ministry of Foreign Affairs (Ministerio de Asuntos Exteriores)		Fernando María Castiella	25 February 1957	30 October 1969	FET–JONS (also a member of ACNP)	
Ministry of Foreign Affairs (Ministerio de Asuntos Exteriores)	1 February – 18 October 1957: (■) Undersecretariat of Foreign Affairs; (■) Directorate-General for Foreign Policy; (■) Directorate-General for Economic Policy (disest. 3 Oct 1957); (■) Directorate-General for Cultural Relations; (■) Directorate-General for Internal Regime; (■) Directorate-General for Consular Affairs; (■) Directorate-General for Relations with Morocco; (■) Service for Chancery, Protocol and Orders–Introducer of Ambassadors; (■) Inspectorate-General for Services Abroad; 18 October 1957 – 17 April 1964: (■) Undersecretariat of Foreign Affairs; (■) Directorate-General for Foreign Policy; (■) Directorate-General for Cultural Relations; (■) Directorate-General for Internal Regime; (■) Directorate-General for Consular Affairs; (■) Directorate-General for Economic Relations; (■) Directorate-General for International Organizations; (■) Directorate-General of the Office for Diplomatic Information (U/G 25 Jan 1960); (■) Service for Chancery, Protocol and Orders–Introducer of Ambassadors; (■) Inspectorate-General for Services Abroad					
=== Ministry of Justice ===
Ministry of Justice (Ministerio de Justicia)		Antonio Iturmendi	19 July 1951	8 July 1965	FET–JONS (Traditionalist)	
=== Ministry of the Army ===
Ministry of the Army (Ministerio del Ejército)		Antonio Barroso Sánchez-Guerra	25 February 1957	11 July 1962	FET–JONS (Military)	
=== Ministry of the Navy ===
Ministry of the Navy (Ministerio de Marina)		Felipe José Abárzuza	25 February 1957	11 July 1962	FET–JONS (Military)	
=== Ministry of Finance ===
Ministry of Finance (Ministerio de Hacienda)		Mariano Navarro Rubio	25 February 1957	8 July 1965	FET–JONS (Opus Dei)	
=== Ministry of Governance ===
Ministry of Governance (Ministerio de la Gobernación)		Camilo Alonso Vega	25 February 1957	30 October 1969	FET–JONS (Military)	
=== Ministry of Public Works ===
Ministry of Public Works (Ministerio de Obras Públicas)		Jorge Vigón	25 February 1957	8 July 1965	FET–JONS (Military)	
=== Ministry of National Education ===
Ministry of National Education (Ministerio de Educación Nacional)		Jesús Rubio García-Mina	15 February 1956	11 July 1962	FET–JONS	
=== Ministry of Labour ===
Ministry of Labour (Ministerio de Trabajo)		Fermín Sanz-Orrio	25 February 1957	11 July 1962	FET–JONS	
=== Ministry of Industry ===
Ministry of Industry (Ministerio de Industria)		Joaquín Planell	19 July 1951	11 July 1962	FET–JONS (Military)	
=== Ministry of Agriculture ===
Ministry of Agriculture (Ministerio de Agricultura)		Cirilo Cánovas	25 February 1957	8 July 1965	FET–JONS	
=== Ministry of the Air ===
Ministry of the Air (Ministerio del Aire)		José Rodríguez y Díaz de Lecea	25 February 1957	11 July 1962	FET–JONS (Military)	
=== Ministry of Trade ===
Ministry of Trade (Ministerio de Comercio)		Alberto Ullastres	25 February 1957	8 July 1965	FET–JONS (Opus Dei)	
=== Ministry of Information and Tourism ===
Ministry of Information and Tourism (Ministerio de Información y Turismo)		Gabriel Arias-Salgado	19 July 1951	11 July 1962	FET–JONS	
=== Ministry of Housing ===
Ministry of Housing (Ministerio de la Vivienda)		José Luis de Arrese	25 February 1957	18 March 1960	FET–JONS	
Ministry of Housing (Ministerio de la Vivienda)		Pedro Gual Villalbí (ordinary discharge of duties)	18 March 1960	21 April 1960	FET–JONS (Nonpartisan)	
Ministry of Housing (Ministerio de la Vivienda)		José María Martínez; Sánchez-Arjona	21 April 1960	30 October 1969	FET–JONS	
=== Ministers without portfolio ===
Minister Secretary-General of FET–JONS (Ministro Secretario General de FET y de las JONS)		José Solís Ruiz	25 February 1957	30 October 1969	FET–JONS	
Minister without portfolio; President of the Council of National Economy (Ministro sin cartera; Presidente del Consejo de Economía Nacional)		Pedro Gual Villalbí	25 February 1957	8 July 1965	FET–JONS (Nonpartisan)	

== Bibliography ==
- Ynfante, Jesús (1970). "Capítulo II: Las bases de reclutamiento. 3. El Opus Dei en la enseñanza superior". La prodigiosa aventura del Opus Dei. Génesis y desarrollo de la Santa Mafia (in Spanish). Ruedo ibérico.
- Sánchez Recio, Glicerio (2013). "Familias políticas, estructuras de poder, instituciones del régimen". In Ruiz Carnicer, Miguel Ángel (ed.). Falange, las culturas políticas del fascismo en la España de Franco (1936-1975) (in Spanish). Vol. 1. Clarendon Press, University of Oxford. pp. 217–229. ISBN 978-84-9911-216-9.

Preceded by Franco IV	Government of Spain; 1957–1962	Succeeded by Franco VI
