= Seventh government of Francisco Franco =

7th government of the Spanish far-right dictator

7th government of Francisco Franco
- Government of Spain
- 1965–1969
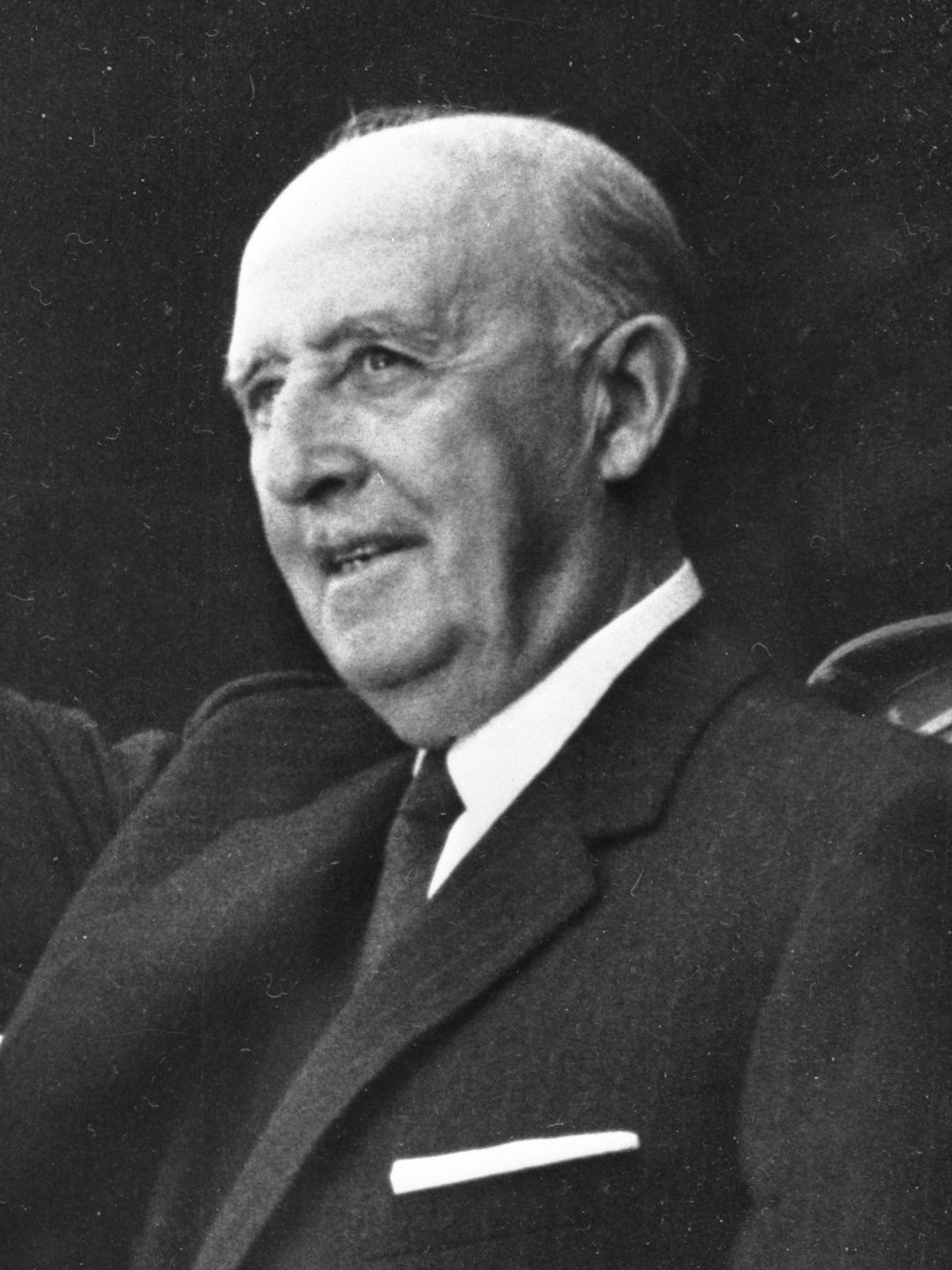
- Franco in May 1968
- Date formed: 8 July 1965
- Date dissolved: 30 October 1969

People and organisations
- Head of State: Francisco Franco
- Prime Minister: Francisco Franco
- Deputy Prime Minister: Agustín Muñoz Grandes (1965–1967); Luis Carrero Blanco (1967–1969)
- No. of ministers: 19 (Note: Does not include the prime minister.) (1965–1967); 18 (1967–1969)
- Total no. of members: 21
- Member party: FET–JONS
- Status in legislature: One-party state

History
- Legislature terms: 8th Cortes Españolas; 9th Cortes Españolas
- Budget: 1966–67, 1968–69
- Predecessor: Franco VI
- Successor: Franco VIII

The seventh (Note: Sources differ on the numbering, depending on whether they consider every cabinet change or just major reshuffles as giving way to a different government. In this sense, some consider the 1965–1969 period as a single government under Franco (the seventh), whereas others split it into two separate ones: 1965–1967 (12th) and 1967–1969 (13th).) government of Francisco Franco was formed on 8 July 1965. It succeeded the sixth Franco government and was the government of Spain from 8 July 1965 to 30 October 1969, a total of 1,575 days, or 4 years, 3 months and 22 days.

Franco's seventh cabinet was made up of members from the different factions or "families" within the National Movement: mainly the FET y de las JONS party—the only legal political party during the Francoist regime—the military, the Opus Dei and the National Catholic Association of Propagandists (ACNP), as well as a number of aligned-nonpartisan technocrats or figures from the civil service. The cabinet would see an extensive reshuffle in October 1969 as a result of internal divisions between the various factions within the Movement and the unveiling of the Matesa scandal earlier that year. During the cabinet's tenure the Organic Law of the State would be passed in 1967, regulating key aspects of the structuring and functioning of the government.

== Council of Ministers ==
The Council of Ministers was structured into the offices for the prime minister, the deputy prime minister and 18 ministries, including two ministers without portfolio.

← Franco VII Government → (8 July 1965 – 30 October 1969)
Portfolio	Name	Party	Took office	Left office	Ref.
Head of State; Prime Minister	Francisco Franco	Military	30 January 1938	9 June 1973	
Deputy Prime Minister	Agustín Muñoz Grandes	Military	11 July 1962	28 July 1967	
Minister of Foreign Affairs	Fernando María Castiella	FET–JONS^{/ACNP}	25 February 1957	30 October 1969	
Minister of Justice	Antonio María de Oriol	FET–JONS^{/Trad.}	8 July 1965	12 June 1973	
Minister of the Army	Camilo Menéndez Tolosa	Military	21 February 1964	30 October 1969	
Minister of the Navy	Pedro Nieto Antúnez	Military	11 July 1962	30 October 1969	
Minister of Finance	Juan José Espinosa San Martín	Opus Dei	8 July 1965	30 October 1969	
Minister of Governance	Camilo Alonso Vega	Military	25 February 1957	30 October 1969	
Minister of Public Works	Federico Silva Muñoz	ACNP	8 July 1965	14 April 1970	
Minister of National Education	Manuel Lora-Tamayo	Nonpartisan	11 July 1962	2 June 1966	
Minister of Labour	Jesús Romeo Gorría	FET–JONS	11 July 1962	30 October 1969	
Minister of Industry	Gregorio López-Bravo	Opus Dei	11 July 1962	30 October 1969	
Minister of Agriculture	Adolfo Díaz-Ambrona	FET–JONS	8 July 1965	30 October 1969	
Minister of the Air	José Lacalle Larraga	Military	11 July 1962	30 October 1969	
Minister of Trade	Faustino García-Moncó	Opus Dei	8 July 1965	30 October 1969	
Minister of Information and Tourism	Manuel Fraga	FET–JONS	11 July 1962	30 October 1969	
Minister of Housing	José María Martínez Sánchez-Arjona	FET–JONS	21 April 1960	30 October 1969	
Minister Undersecretary of the Presidency	Luis Carrero Blanco	Military	19 July 1951	22 September 1967	
Minister Secretary-General of the Movement	José Solís Ruiz	FET–JONS	25 February 1957	30 October 1969	
Minister without portfolio Commissioner for the Economic and Social Development Plan	Laureano López Rodó	Opus Dei	8 July 1965	12 June 1973	
=== Changes June 1966 ===
Portfolio	Name	Faction	Took office	Left office	Ref.
Minister of Education and Science (Note: On 2 June 1966, the Minister of National Education was reorganized as the Minister of Education and Science.)	Manuel Lora-Tamayo	Nonpartisan	2 June 1966	17 April 1968	
=== Changes July 1967 ===
Portfolio	Name	Faction	Took office	Left office	Ref.
Deputy Prime Minister	Vacant from 28 July to 22 September 1967.				
=== Changes September 1967 ===
Portfolio	Name	Faction	Took office	Left office	Ref.
Deputy Prime Minister; Minister Undersecretary of the Presidency	Luis Carrero Blanco	Military	22 September 1967	12 June 1973	
=== Changes April 1968 ===
Portfolio	Name	Faction	Took office	Left office	Ref.
Minister of Education and Science	José Luis Villar Palasí	Nonpartisan	17 April 1968	12 June 1973	

== Departmental structure ==
Francisco Franco's seventh government was organised into several superior and governing units, whose number, powers and hierarchical structure varied depending on the ministerial department.

Unit/body rank

- (■) Undersecretary
- (■) Director-general
- (◆) Military & intelligence agency

Office (Original name)	Portrait	Name	Took office	Left office	Alliance/party	Ref.
=== Prime Minister's Office ===
Prime Minister (Presidencia del Gobierno)		Francisco Franco	30 January 1938	9 June 1973	FET–JONS (Military)	
Deputy Prime Minister (Vicepresidencia del Gobierno)		Agustín Muñoz Grandes	11 July 1962	28 July 1967	FET–JONS (Military)	
Deputy Prime Minister (Vicepresidencia del Gobierno)		Luis Carrero Blanco	22 September 1967	12 June 1973	FET–JONS (Military)	
Minister Undersecretary of the Presidency (Ministro Subsecretario de la Presidencia)		Luis Carrero Blanco	19 July 1951	12 June 1973	FET–JONS (Military)	
=== Ministry of Foreign Affairs ===
Ministry of Foreign Affairs (Ministerio de Asuntos Exteriores)		Fernando María Castiella	25 February 1957	30 October 1969	FET–JONS (also a member of ACNP)	
=== Ministry of Justice ===
Ministry of Justice (Ministerio de Justicia)		Antonio María de Oriol	8 July 1965	12 June 1973	FET–JONS (Traditionalist)	
=== Ministry of the Army ===
Ministry of the Army (Ministerio del Ejército)		Camilo Menéndez Tolosa	21 February 1964	30 October 1969	FET–JONS (Military)	
=== Ministry of the Navy ===
Ministry of the Navy (Ministerio de Marina)		Pedro Nieto Antúnez	11 July 1962	30 October 1969	FET–JONS (Military)	
=== Ministry of Finance ===
Ministry of Finance (Ministerio de Hacienda)		Juan José Espinosa San Martín	8 July 1965	30 October 1969	FET–JONS (Opus Dei)	
=== Ministry of Governance ===
Ministry of Governance (Ministerio de la Gobernación)		Camilo Alonso Vega	25 February 1957	30 October 1969	FET–JONS (Military)	
=== Ministry of Public Works ===
Ministry of Public Works (Ministerio de Obras Públicas)		Federico Silva Muñoz	8 July 1965	14 April 1970	FET–JONS (ACNP)	
=== Ministry of Education ===
Ministry of National Education (Ministerio de Educación Nacional) (until 2 June 1966) Ministry of Education and Science (Ministerio de Educación y Ciencia) (from 2 June 1966)		Manuel Lora-Tamayo	11 July 1962	17 April 1968	FET–JONS (Nonpartisan)	
Ministry of National Education (Ministerio de Educación Nacional) (until 2 June 1966) Ministry of Education and Science (Ministerio de Educación y Ciencia) (from 2 June 1966)		José Luis Villar Palasí	17 April 1968	12 June 1973	FET–JONS (Nonpartisan)	
=== Ministry of Labour ===
Ministry of Labour (Ministerio de Trabajo)		Jesús Romeo Gorría	11 July 1962	30 October 1969	FET–JONS	
=== Ministry of Industry ===
Ministry of Industry (Ministerio de Industria)		Gregorio López-Bravo	11 July 1962	30 October 1969	FET–JONS (Opus Dei)	
=== Ministry of Agriculture ===
Ministry of Agriculture (Ministerio de Agricultura)		Adolfo Díaz-Ambrona	8 July 1965	30 October 1969	FET–JONS	
=== Ministry of the Air ===
Ministry of the Air (Ministerio del Aire)		José Lacalle Larraga	11 July 1962	30 October 1969	FET–JONS (Military)	
=== Ministry of Trade ===
Ministry of Trade (Ministerio de Comercio)		Faustino García-Moncó	8 July 1965	30 October 1969	FET–JONS (Opus Dei)	
=== Ministry of Information and Tourism ===
Ministry of Information and Tourism (Ministerio de Información y Turismo)		Manuel Fraga	11 July 1962	30 October 1969	FET–JONS	
=== Ministry of Housing ===
Ministry of Housing (Ministerio de la Vivienda)		José María Martínez; Sánchez-Arjona	21 April 1960	30 October 1969	FET–JONS	
=== Ministers without portfolio ===
Minister Secretary-General of FET–JONS (Ministro Secretario General de FET y de las JONS)		José Solís Ruiz	25 February 1957	30 October 1969	FET–JONS	
Minister without portfolio; Commissioner for the Economic and Social Development Plan (Ministro sin cartera; Comisario del Plan de Desarrollo Económico y Social)		Laureano López Rodó	8 July 1965	12 June 1973	FET–JONS (Opus Dei)	

== Bibliography ==
- Ynfante, Jesús (1970). "Capítulo II: Las bases de reclutamiento. 3. El Opus Dei en la enseñanza superior". La prodigiosa aventura del Opus Dei. Génesis y desarrollo de la Santa Mafia (in Spanish). Ruedo ibérico.
- Sáez Alba, A. (1974). "Introducción a la ACNP". La otra cosa nostra. La Asociación Católica Nacional de Propagandistas y el caso de El Correo de Andalucía (in Spanish). Ruedo ibérico.
- Sánchez Recio, Glicerio (2013). "Familias políticas, estructuras de poder, instituciones del régimen". In Ruiz Carnicer, Miguel Ángel (ed.). Falange, las culturas políticas del fascismo en la España de Franco (1936-1975) (in Spanish). Vol. 1. Clarendon Press, University of Oxford. pp. 217–229. ISBN 978-84-9911-216-9.
- Martín Puerta, Antonio (2015). "La Asociación Católica Nacional de Propagandistas durante la fase central del régimen de Franco". Hispania Sacra. 67 (135): 303–338. doi:10.3989/hs.2015.009. ISSN 0018-215X.

Preceded by Franco VI	Government of Spain; 1965–1969	Succeeded by Franco VIII
