= Fourth government of Francisco Franco =

1951–1957 government of Spain

4th government of Francisco Franco
- Government of Spain
- 1951–1957
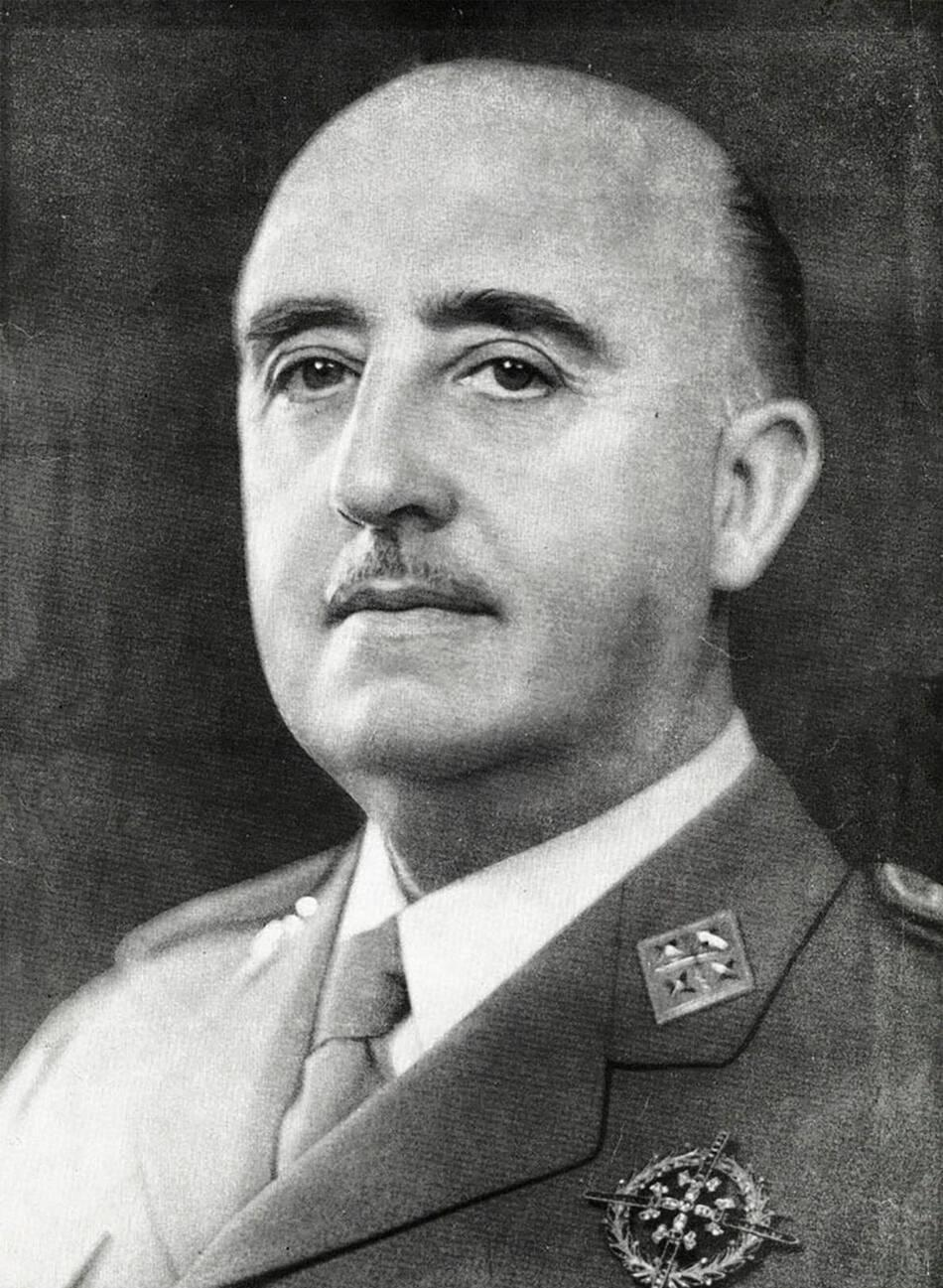
- Franco in the 1950s
- Date formed: 19 July 1951
- Date dissolved: 25 February 1957

People and organisations
- Head of State: Francisco Franco
- Prime Minister: Francisco Franco
- No. of ministers: 16 (Note: Does not include the prime minister.)
- Total no. of members: 18
- Member party: FET–JONS
- Status in legislature: One-party state

History
- Legislature terms: 3rd Cortes Españolas; 4th Cortes Españolas; 5th Cortes Españolas
- Budget: 1952–53, 1954–55, 1956–57
- Predecessor: Franco III
- Successor: Franco V

The fourth (Note: Sources differ on the numbering, depending on whether they consider every cabinet change or just major reshuffles as giving way to a different government. In this sense, some consider the 1951–1957 period as a single government under Franco (the fourth), whereas others split it into two separate ones: 1951–1956 (8th) and 1956–1957 (9th).) government of Francisco Franco was formed on 19 July 1951. It succeeded the third Franco government and was the government of Spain from 19 July 1951 to 25 February 1957, a total of 2,048 days, or 5 years, 7 months and 6 days.

Franco's fourth cabinet was made up of members from the different factions or "families" within the National Movement: mainly the FET y de las JONS party—the only legal political party during the Francoist regime—the military, the National Catholic Association of Propagandists (ACNP) and a number of aligned-nonpartisan figures from the civil service. The new government saw the establishment of the Ministry of Information and Tourism.

== Council of Ministers ==
The Council of Ministers was structured into the office for the prime minister and 16 ministries.

← Franco IV Government → (19 July 1951 – 25 February 1957)
Portfolio	Name	Party	Took office	Left office	Ref.
Head of State; Prime Minister	Francisco Franco	Military	30 January 1938	9 June 1973	
Minister of Foreign Affairs	Alberto Martín-Artajo	ACNP	20 July 1945	25 February 1957	
Minister of the Army	Agustín Muñoz Grandes	Military	19 July 1951	25 February 1957	
Minister of the Navy	Salvador Moreno Fernández	Military	19 July 1951	25 February 1957	
Minister of Justice	Antonio Iturmendi	FET–JONS^{/Trad.}	19 July 1951	8 July 1965	
Minister of Finance	Francisco Gómez de Llano	Nonpartisan	19 July 1951	25 February 1957	
Minister of Governance	Blas Pérez González	FET–JONS	3 September 1942	25 February 1957	
Minister of Industry	Joaquín Planell	Military	19 July 1951	11 July 1962	
Minister of Trade	Manuel Arburúa de la Miyar	Nonpartisan	19 July 1951	25 February 1957	
Minister of Agriculture	Rafael Cavestany	FET–JONS	19 July 1951	25 February 1957	
Minister of National Education	Joaquín Ruiz-Giménez	ACNP	19 July 1951	15 February 1956	
Minister of Labour	José Antonio Girón	FET–JONS	19 May 1941	25 February 1957	
Minister of Public Works	Fernando Suárez de Tangil	Nonpartisan	19 July 1951	25 February 1957	
Minister of the Air	Eduardo González-Gallarza	Military	20 July 1945	25 February 1957	
Minister of Information and Tourism	Gabriel Arias-Salgado	FET–JONS	19 July 1951	11 July 1962	
Minister Secretary-General of FET–JONS	Raimundo Fernández-Cuesta	FET–JONS	19 July 1951	15 February 1956	
Minister Undersecretary of the Presidency	Luis Carrero Blanco	Military	19 July 1951	22 September 1967	
=== Changes February 1956 ===
Portfolio	Name	Faction	Took office	Left office	Ref.
Minister of National Education	Jesús Rubio García-Mina	FET–JONS	15 February 1956	11 July 1962	
Minister Secretary-General of FET–JONS	José Luis de Arrese	FET–JONS	15 February 1956	25 February 1957	

== Departmental structure ==
Franco's fourth government was organised into several superior and governing units, whose number, powers and hierarchical structure varied depending on the ministerial department.

Unit/body rank

- (■) Undersecretary
- (■) Director-general
- (◆) Military & intelligence agency

Office (Original name)	Portrait	Name	Took office	Left office	Alliance/party	Ref.
=== Prime Minister's Office ===
Prime Minister (Presidencia del Gobierno)		Francisco Franco	30 January 1938	9 June 1973	FET–JONS (Military)	
Minister Undersecretary of the Presidency (Ministro Subsecretario de la Presidencia)		Luis Carrero Blanco	19 July 1951	9 June 1973	FET–JONS (Military)	
=== Ministry of Foreign Affairs ===
Ministry of Foreign Affairs (Ministerio de Asuntos Exteriores)		Alberto Martín-Artajo	20 July 1945	25 February 1957	FET–JONS (ACNP)	
Ministry of Foreign Affairs (Ministerio de Asuntos Exteriores)	16 July 1949 – 3 October 1957: (■) Undersecretariat of Foreign Affairs; (■) Directorate-General for Foreign Policy; (■) Directorate-General for Economic Policy; (■) Directorate-General for Cultural Relations; (■) Directorate-General for Internal Regime; (■) Directorate-General for Consular Affairs; (■) Directorate-General for Relations with Morocco (est. 1 Feb 1957); (■) Service for Chancery, Protocol and Orders–Introducer of Ambassadors; (■) Inspectorate-General for Services Abroad (est. 3 Dec 1954)					
=== Ministry of the Army ===
Ministry of the Army (Ministerio del Ejército)		Agustín Muñoz Grandes	19 July 1951	25 February 1957	FET–JONS (Military)	
=== Ministry of the Navy ===
Ministry of the Navy (Ministerio de Marina)		Salvador Moreno Fernández	19 July 1951	25 February 1957	FET–JONS (Military)	
=== Ministry of Justice ===
Ministry of Justice (Ministerio de Justicia)		Antonio Iturmendi	19 July 1951	8 July 1965	FET–JONS (Traditionalist)	
=== Ministry of Finance ===
Ministry of Finance (Ministerio de Hacienda)		Francisco Gómez de Llano	19 July 1951	25 February 1957	FET–JONS (Nonpartisan)	
=== Ministry of Governance ===
Ministry of Governance (Ministerio de la Gobernación)		Blas Pérez González	3 September 1942	25 February 1957	FET–JONS	
=== Ministry of Industry ===
Ministry of Industry (Ministerio de Industria)		Joaquín Planell	19 July 1951	11 July 1962	FET–JONS (Military)	
=== Ministry of Trade ===
Ministry of Trade (Ministerio de Comercio)		Manuel Arburúa de la Miyar	19 July 1951	25 February 1957	FET–JONS (Nonpartisan)	
=== Ministry of Agriculture ===
Ministry of Agriculture (Ministerio de Agricultura)		Rafael Cavestany	19 July 1951	25 February 1957	FET–JONS	
=== Ministry of National Education ===
Ministry of National Education (Ministerio de Educación Nacional)		Joaquín Ruiz-Giménez	19 July 1951	15 February 1956	FET–JONS (ACNP)	
Ministry of National Education (Ministerio de Educación Nacional)		Jesús Rubio García-Mina	15 February 1956	11 July 1962	FET–JONS	
=== Ministry of Labour ===
Ministry of Labour (Ministerio de Trabajo)		José Antonio Girón	19 May 1941	25 February 1957	FET–JONS	
=== Ministry of Public Works ===
Ministry of Public Works (Ministerio de Obras Públicas)		Fernando Suárez de Tangil	19 July 1951	25 February 1957	FET–JONS (Nonpartisan)	
=== Ministry of the Air ===
Ministry of the Air (Ministerio del Aire)		Eduardo González-Gallarza	20 July 1945	25 February 1957	FET–JONS (Military)	
=== Ministry of Information and Tourism ===
Ministry of Information and Tourism (Ministerio de Información y Turismo)		Gabriel Arias-Salgado	19 July 1951	11 July 1962	FET–JONS	
=== Ministers without portfolio ===
Minister Secretary-General of FET–JONS (Ministro Secretario General de FET y de las JONS)		Raimundo Fernández-Cuesta	19 July 1951	15 February 1956	FET–JONS	
Minister Secretary-General of FET–JONS (Ministro Secretario General de FET y de las JONS)		José Luis de Arrese	15 February 1956	25 February 1957	FET–JONS	

== Bibliography ==
- Sánchez Recio, Glicerio (2013). "Familias políticas, estructuras de poder, instituciones del régimen". In Ruiz Carnicer, Miguel Ángel (ed.). Falange, las culturas políticas del fascismo en la España de Franco (1936-1975) (in Spanish). Vol. 1. Clarendon Press, University of Oxford. pp. 217–229. ISBN 978-84-9911-216-9.

Preceded by Franco III	Government of Spain; 1951–1957	Succeeded by Franco V
