= Government of Francisco Franco =

Government of Francisco Franco may refer to:

- First government of Francisco Franco
- Second government of Francisco Franco
- Third government of Francisco Franco
- Fourth government of Francisco Franco
- Fifth government of Francisco Franco
- Sixth government of Francisco Franco
- Seventh government of Francisco Franco
- Eighth government of Francisco Franco
