= Federico Silva Muñoz =

Spanish politician (1923–1997)

Minister of Public Works of Spain
- In office 8 July 1965 – 14 April 1970
- Prime Minister: Francisco Franco
- Preceded by: Jorge Vigón
- Succeeded by: Gonzalo Fernández de la Mora

Personal details
- Born: Federico Silva Muñoz; 28 October 1923 Benavente, Kingdom of Spain
- Died: 12 August 1997 (aged 73) Madrid, Spain
- Party: ACNP (National Movement)

Federico Silva Muñoz (28 October 1923 – 12 August 1997) was a Spanish politician who served as Minister of Public Works of Spain between 1965 and 1970, during the Francoist dictatorship. He was a member of the Catholic Association of Propagandists.

== Bibliography ==
- Sáez Alba, A. (1974). "Introducción a la ACNP". La otra cosa nostra. La Asociación Católica Nacional de Propagandistas y el caso de El Correo de Andalucía (in Spanish). Ruedo ibérico.
- Martín Puerta, Antonio (2015). "La Asociación Católica Nacional de Propagandistas durante la fase central del régimen de Franco". Hispania Sacra. 67 (135): 303–338. doi:10.3989/hs.2015.009. ISSN 0018-215X.
