= Fernando Suárez de Tangil =

Spanish politician

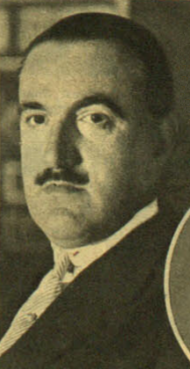

Minister of Public Works of Spain
- In office 19 July 1951 – 25 February 1957
- Prime Minister: Francisco Franco
- Preceded by: José María Fernández-Ladreda
- Succeeded by: Jorge Vigón

Personal details
- Born: Fernando Suárez de Tangil y Angulo; 3 August 1886 Madrid, Kingdom of Spain
- Died: 6 September 1964 (aged 78) Madrid, Spanish State
- Party: Nonpartisan (National Movement)

Fernando Suárez de Tangil y Angulo, 2nd Marquess of Covarrubias de Leyva (3 August 1886 – 6 September 1964), mostly known as the Count of Vallellano after his wife's title, was a Spanish politician who served as Minister of Public Works of Spain between 1951 and 1957, during the Francoist dictatorship.
