= Joaquín Planell =

Spanish general

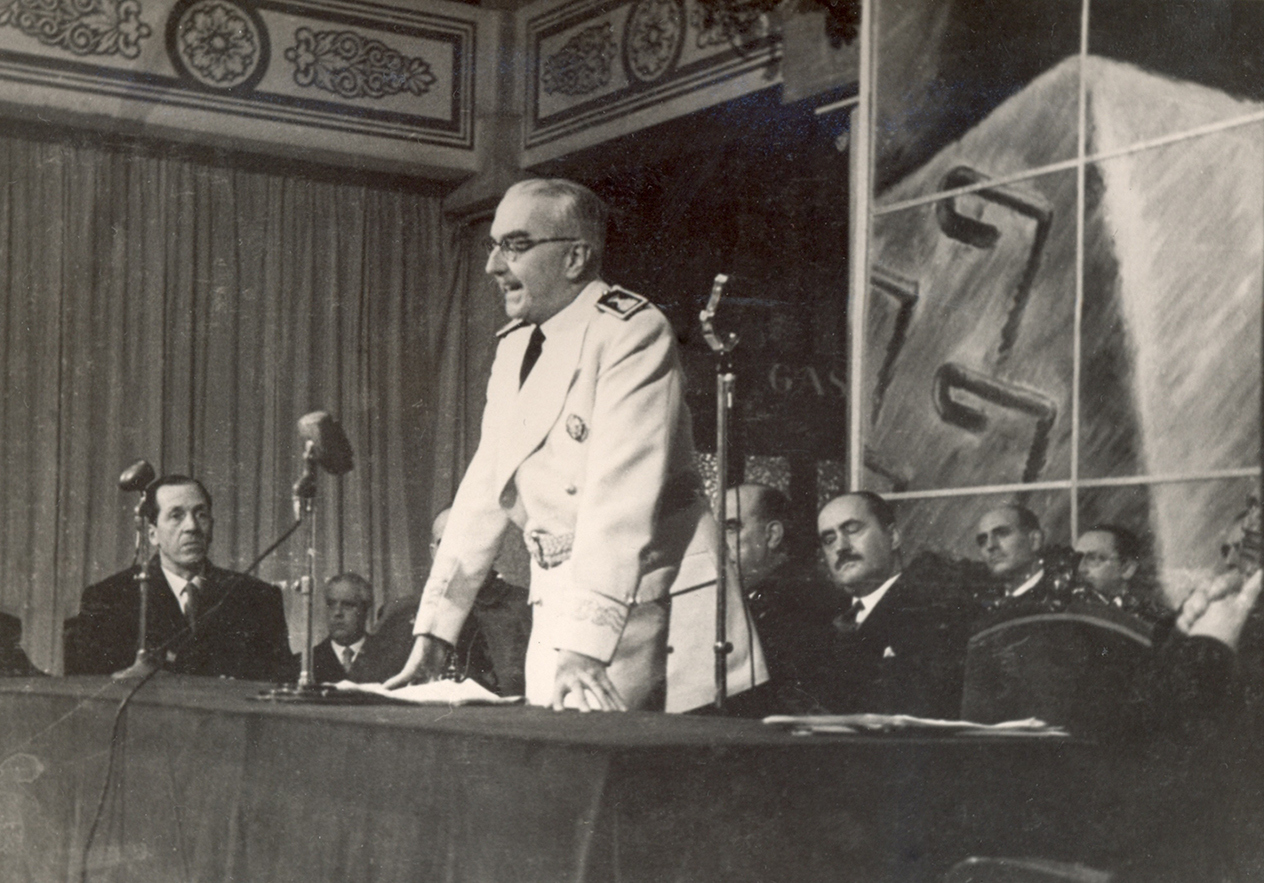
- Joaquín Planell in 1951

Minister of Industry of Spain
- In office 19 July 1951 – 11 July 1962
- Prime Minister: Francisco Franco
- Preceded by: Juan Antonio Suanzes (Industry and Trade)
- Succeeded by: Gregorio López-Bravo

Personal details
- Born: Joaquín Planell Riera; 22 November 1891 Vitoria, Kingdom of Spain
- Died: 3 July 1969 (aged 77) Madrid, Spanish State

Military service
- Branch/service: Spanish Armed Forces
- Years of service: 1910–1969

Joaquín Planell Riera (22 November 1891 – 3 July 1969) was a Spanish general who served as Minister of Industry of Spain between 1951 and 1962, during the Francoist dictatorship.
