= Cirilo Cánovas =

Spanish politician (1899–1973)

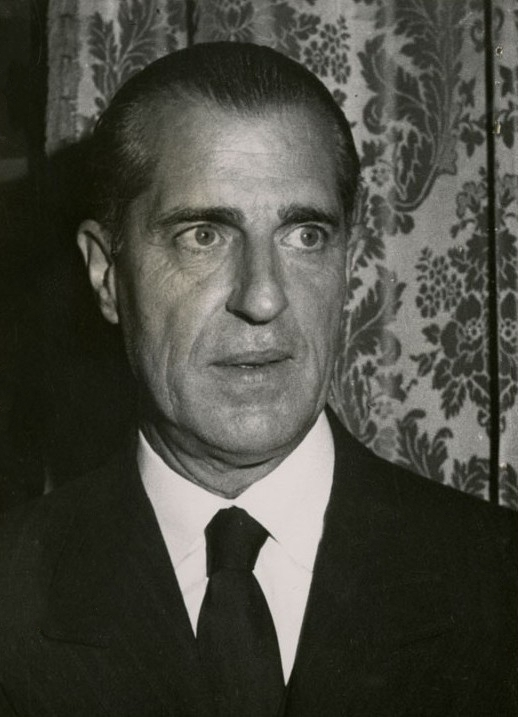
- García in 1957

Minister of Agriculture of Spain
- In office 25 February 1957 – 8 July 1965
- Prime Minister: Francisco Franco
- Preceded by: Rafael Cavestany
- Succeeded by: Adolfo Díaz-Ambrona Moreno

Personal details
- Born: Cirilo Cánovas García; 9 July 1899 Requena, Kingdom of Spain
- Died: 25 January 1973 (aged 73) Madrid, Spanish State
- Party: FET y de las JONS

Cirilo Cánovas García (9 July 1899 – 25 January 1973) was a Spanish politician who served as Minister of Agriculture of Spain between 1957 and 1965, during the Francoist dictatorship. He was a member of FET y de las JONS.
