= Jesús Romeo Gorría =

Spanish politician

Minister of Labour of Spain
- In office 11 July 1962 – 30 October 1969
- Prime Minister: Francisco Franco
- Preceded by: Fermín Sanz-Orrio
- Succeeded by: Licinio de la Fuente

Personal details
- Born: Jesús Romeo Gorría; 19 September 1916 Bilbao, Kingdom of Spain
- Died: 2 April 2001 (aged 84) Madrid, Spain
- Party: FET y de las JONS

Jesús Romeo Gorría (19 September 1916 – 2 April 2001) was a Spanish politician who served as Minister of Labour of Spain between 1962 and 1969, during the Francoist dictatorship. He was a member of FET y de las JONS.
