= Fermín Sanz-Orrio =

Spanish politician

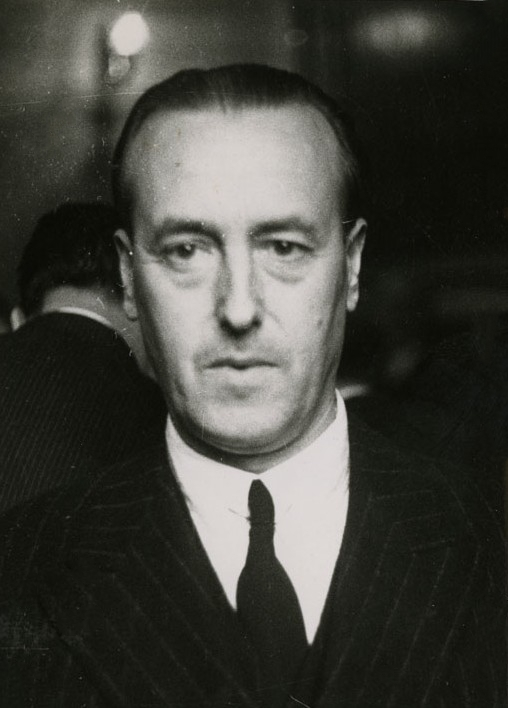

Minister of Labour of Spain
- In office 25 February 1957 – 11 July 1962
- Prime Minister: Francisco Franco
- Preceded by: José Antonio Girón
- Succeeded by: Jesús Romeo Gorría

Personal details
- Born: Fermín Sanz-Orrio y Sanz; 14 July 1901 Pamplona, Navarre, Spain
- Died: 29 November 1998 (aged 97) Madrid, Spain
- Party: FET y de las JONS (National Movement)

Fermín Sanz-Orrio y Sanz (14 July 1901 – 29 November 1998) was a Spanish politician who served as Minister of Labour of Spain between 1957 and 1962, during the Francoist dictatorship.
