= Jorge Vigón =

Spanish government official

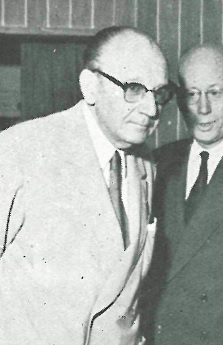

Minister of Public Works of Spain
- In office 25 February 1957 – 8 July 1965
- Prime Minister: Francisco Franco
- Preceded by: Fernando Suárez de Tangil
- Succeeded by: Federico Silva Muñoz

Personal details
- Born: Jorge Vigón Suero-Díaz; 18 May 1893 Colunga, Kingdom of Spain
- Died: 13 February 1978 (aged 84) Madrid, Spanish State

Military service
- Branch/service: Spanish Armed Forces
- Years of service: 1909–1978

Jorge Vigón Suero-Díaz (18 May 1893 – 13 February 1978) was a Spanish general who served as Minister of Public Works of Spain between 1957 and 1965, during the Francoist dictatorship.
