= Manuel Lora-Tamayo =

Minister of Education and Science of Spain
- In office 2 June 1966 – 17 April 1968
- Prime Minister: Francisco Franco
- Preceded by: Himself (National Education)
- Succeeded by: José Luis Villar Palasí

Minister of National Education of Spain
- In office 11 July 1962 – 2 June 1966
- Prime Minister: Francisco Franco
- Preceded by: Jesús Rubio García-Mina
- Succeeded by: Himself (Education and Science)

Personal details
- Born: Manuel Lora-Tamayo Martín; 21 January 1904 Jerez de la Frontera, Spain
- Died: 22 August 2002 (aged 98) Madrid, Spain
- Party: Nonpartisan (National Movement)
- Children: Emilio Lora-Tamayo

Manuel Lora-Tamayo Martín (Jerez de la Frontera, 21 January 1904 – Madrid, 22 August 2002) was a Chemist and Spanish politician who served as Minister of National Education of Spain (later renamed as Education and Science) between 1962 and 1968, during the Francoist dictatorship. He was the second president of the Spanish National Research Council (CSIC).

He was a member of the Spanish Royal Academy of Exact, Physical and Natural Sciences, the Spanish Royal Academy of Pharmacy and the Pontifical Academy of Sciences.

== Biography ==
Lora studied Chemistry and Pharmacy at the Central University (Madrid). He earned a Phd in Chemistry in 1930 and in Pharmacy in 1933. He worked at the University of Strasbourg with a grant from the Junta para Ampliación de Estudios. In 1933, he was appointed to the Chair of Organic chemistry at the Faculty of Medicine of Cádiz (University of Sevilla). In 1935 he began teaching in Seville and, finally, in 1942, he arrived at the prestigious University of Madrid.

He collaborated with José María Albareda and José Ibáñez Martín in founding the Spanish National Research Council (CSIC) in 1939. In 1962, he was appointed Minister of National Education. Later, in 1966, Lora changed the name of this institution to the Ministry of Education and Science. He was known for his cuatious reform of Spanish university system. In addition, he made a decisive contribution to the expansion of education in Spain, especially primary schools and technical training. In 1968, students protests lead to his resignation. At this difficult time, Lora had many problems the more violent views of the Minister of the Interior, Camilo Alonso Vega.

== Bibliography ==
- Veci Lavín, Carlos (2025). "Política a través de la ciencia: Manuel Lora Tamayo, ministro de Educación". Historia Contemporánea.
