= Pedro Gual Villalbí =

Spanish politician

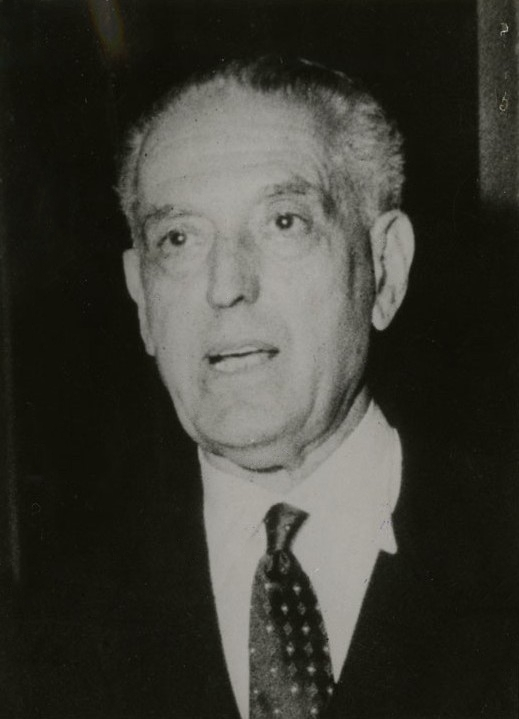

Minister without portfolio
- In office 25 February 1957 – 8 July 1965
- Prime Minister: Francisco Franco

Minister of Housing
- Acting
- In office 18 March 1960 – 21 April 1960
- Prime Minister: Francisco Franco
- Preceded by: José Luis de Arrese
- Succeeded by: José María Martínez Sánchez-Arjona

Personal details
- Born: Pedro Gual Villalbí; 20 November 1885 Requena, Kingdom of Spain
- Died: 12 January 1968 (aged 82) Madrid, Spanish State
- Party: Nonpartisan (National Movement)

Pedro Gual Villalbí (20 November 1885 – 12 January 1968) was a Spanish politician who served as a minister without portfolio between 1957 and 1965, as well as briefly as acting Minister of Housing between March and April 1960, during the Francoist dictatorship.
