= José Solís Ruiz =

Spanish politician (1913–1990)

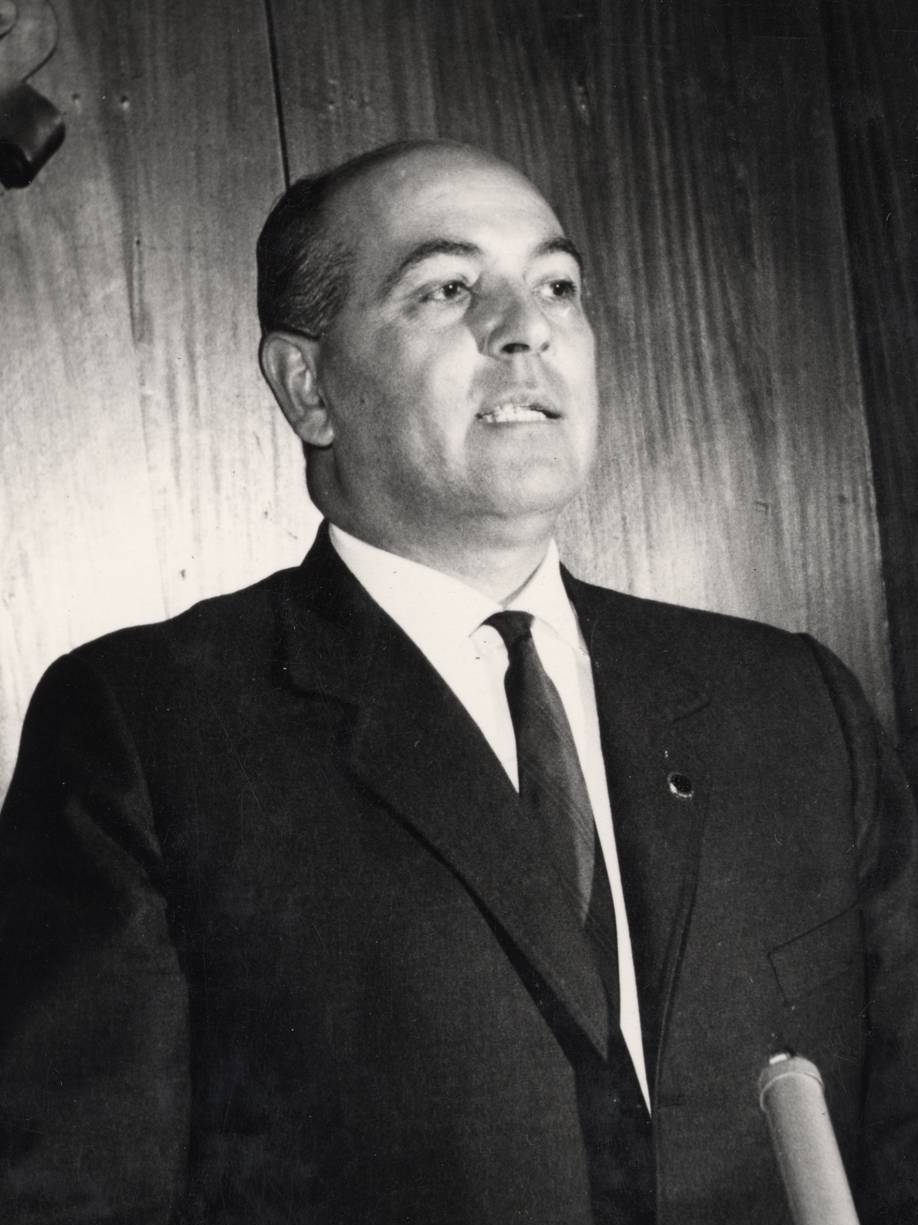
- Solís pictured in 1962.

Civil Governor of Pontevedra
- In office 15 July 1948 – 8 June 1951

Civil Governor of Guipúzcoa
- In office 8 June 1951 – 7 September 1951

National Delegate of the Spanish Syndical Organization
- In office 7 September 1951 – 29 October 1969
- Preceded by: Fermín Sanz-Orrio
- Succeeded by: Enrique García-Ramal

Secretary General of the National Movement
- In office 25 February 1957 – 29 October 1969
- Preceded by: José Luis de Arrese
- Succeeded by: Torcuato Fernández-Miranda
- In office 13 June 1975 – 11 December 1975
- Preceded by: Fernando Herrero Tejedor
- Succeeded by: Adolfo Suárez

Minister of Labour
- In office 11 December 1975 – 7 July 1976

Representative at the Cortes Españolas
- In office 1946–1975

Personal details
- Born: 27 September 1913 Cabra, Spain
- Died: 30 May 1990 (aged 76) Madrid, Spain
- Party: FET y de las JONS
- Education: University of Valladolid; University of Deusto
- Occupation: Representative politician

Military service
- Branch/service: Spanish Army
- Unit: Military Legal Corps
- Battles/wars: Spanish Civil War

José Solís Ruiz (27 September 1913 – 30 May 1990) was a Spanish politician, known for his role in Francoist Spain, during which he occupied a number of important posts.

As a member of the Military Legal Corps, during Franco's regime he became civil government of several provinces, national representative of Trade Unions and the Secretary General of the FET y de las JONS party, a primary component of the "National movement". As such, he had a prominent role in the regime's policies during their developmental stage. Among the adopted measures was the enactment of the National Movement Principles Act, one of the regime's fundamental laws. An easy-going and jovial person, he quickly became one of the most popular figures of the dictatorship and was known as "the smile of the regime".

== Biography ==
=== Youth and Training ===
He was born on 27 September 1913 in the town of Cabra in Cordoba, into a family of small agricultural land owners in Andalusia. He was the son of Felipe Solís Villechenous – the Mayor of Cabra during the dictatorship of Primo de Rivera – and Eduarda Ruiz Luna. He studied law at the University of Deusto and the University of Valladolid.

As part of the "old guard" of the Falange Española de las Juntas de Ofensiva Nacional Sindicalista(FE de las JONS), (Note: Although "old guard" José Antonio Girón de Velasco would later say that Solis was never a real member of FET y de las JONS.) he came to take part in the Civil War in support of the Nationalists. During the conflict he would reach the rank of provisional alférez. At the end of dispute, he joined the opposition Technical Trade Union Ministry, where he held the seat of Secretary of the National Metalworkers' Trade Union, a part of the national trade union center. He was part of the Military Legal Corps, which he entered through opposition. As such, in 1941 he acted as prosecutor in the trial against a group of anarchist members of the Maquis, whom Solís accused of sabotage and of wanting to restore the Republic. They would finally be sentenced to death and executed. In 1944 he was enlisted as secretary to the General Vice-Secretary of Social Ordinance, a body in charge of trade union issues, among others. Although technically an "old guard" of the Falange Española, Solís spent much of his professional career as an Army legal officer and as a union steward, so he had little contact with the original fascist movement.

=== Role in the Unions ===
In 1946, he was appointed as a representative to the Cortes Españolas, a position he held for almost all the years of the dictatorship until December 1975. During 1946, as part of his job as the Vice-secretary General of Social Ordinance, he organised the first Trade Union elections and also the first National Congress of Workers. Later he served as Civil Governor of the provinces of Pontevedra and Guipúzcoa.

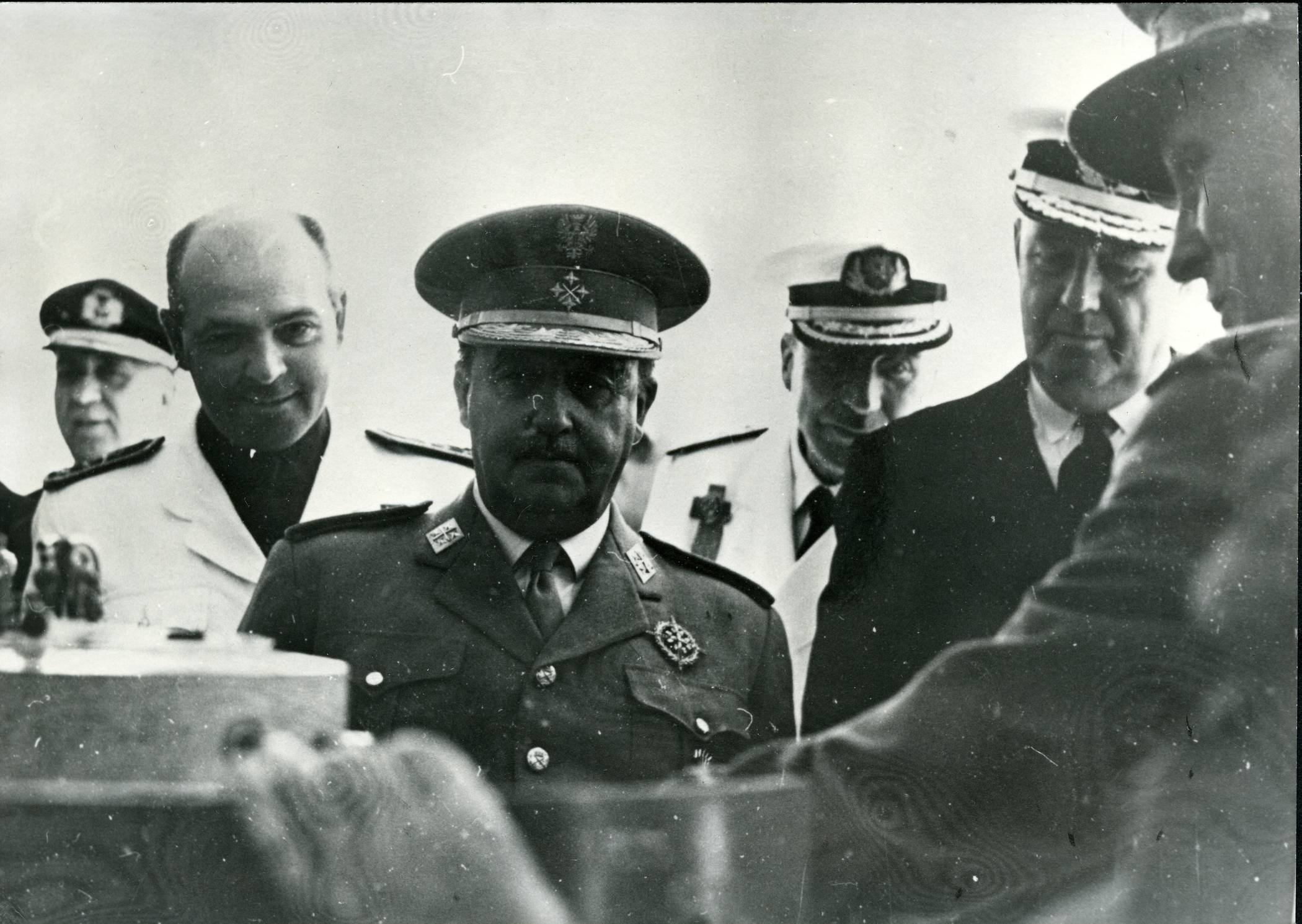
Solís pictured with Franco in 1950.

In 1951, he was appointed national Trade Union representative, replacing Fermín Sanz-Orrio, who has resigned after the Barcelona tram strike of the same year. A jovial, polite and easy-going person, Solís soon became one of the most popular leaders of the regime and would become known as the "smile of the regime". During the following years he maintained a great presence in Spanish public and political life. It should be taken into account that his time as national trade union representative also coincided with the Spanish economic boom of the 1960s, known as the Spanish miracle. Under Solís, the labor institutions achieved maximum impact; he contributed to both expanding and modernizing them.The union work "Educacion y Descanso" (EyD) became one of the most popular instruments of trade unions among the working class, owing either to its network of recreational facilities or to its wide range of cultural activities. (Note: Educación y Descanso (EyD)was a recreational organization that was dependent on the Organización Sindical Española, that existed between 1940 and 1977 and promoted leisure activities among workers – such as sports, theatre, folk music, dance and music choruses—.)

Before the rise of the "technocrats" within the government and the administration, the Falange Española party were "entrenched" in the Trade Union Organization, promoting a kind of "openness" (Note: However, the Falange's Delegación Nacional de Información e Investigación – a kind of single party intelligence service – had a carte blanche to investigate the past of candidates for trade union elections and even had the power to oversee the electoral process itself.) from the organization towards workers until this advocacy group became the core of Francoism. For example, after 1954 it was no longer necessary to possess a FET y de las JONS card to be able to participate in the trade union elections and even was even an attempt from the Francoist apparatus to attract former anarcho-syndicalist leaders to its core/bosom. Through this openness, Solís also sought to obtain the approval of the International Labour Organization (ILO). This process culminated in the 1966 union elections of "liaisons" and "jurors" who enjoyed relative freedom. But these elections did not reinforce the nationalist position, but quite the opposite, as Left-wing opposition were elected to many of the posts through the clandestine movement of the "workers’ commissions". By 1967–1968, the liberalizing experiment could not be terminated. In fact Solís had no objection to supporting the repression of the workers’ commissions during the state of emergency period decreed in 1968.

=== Secretary General of the Movement ===
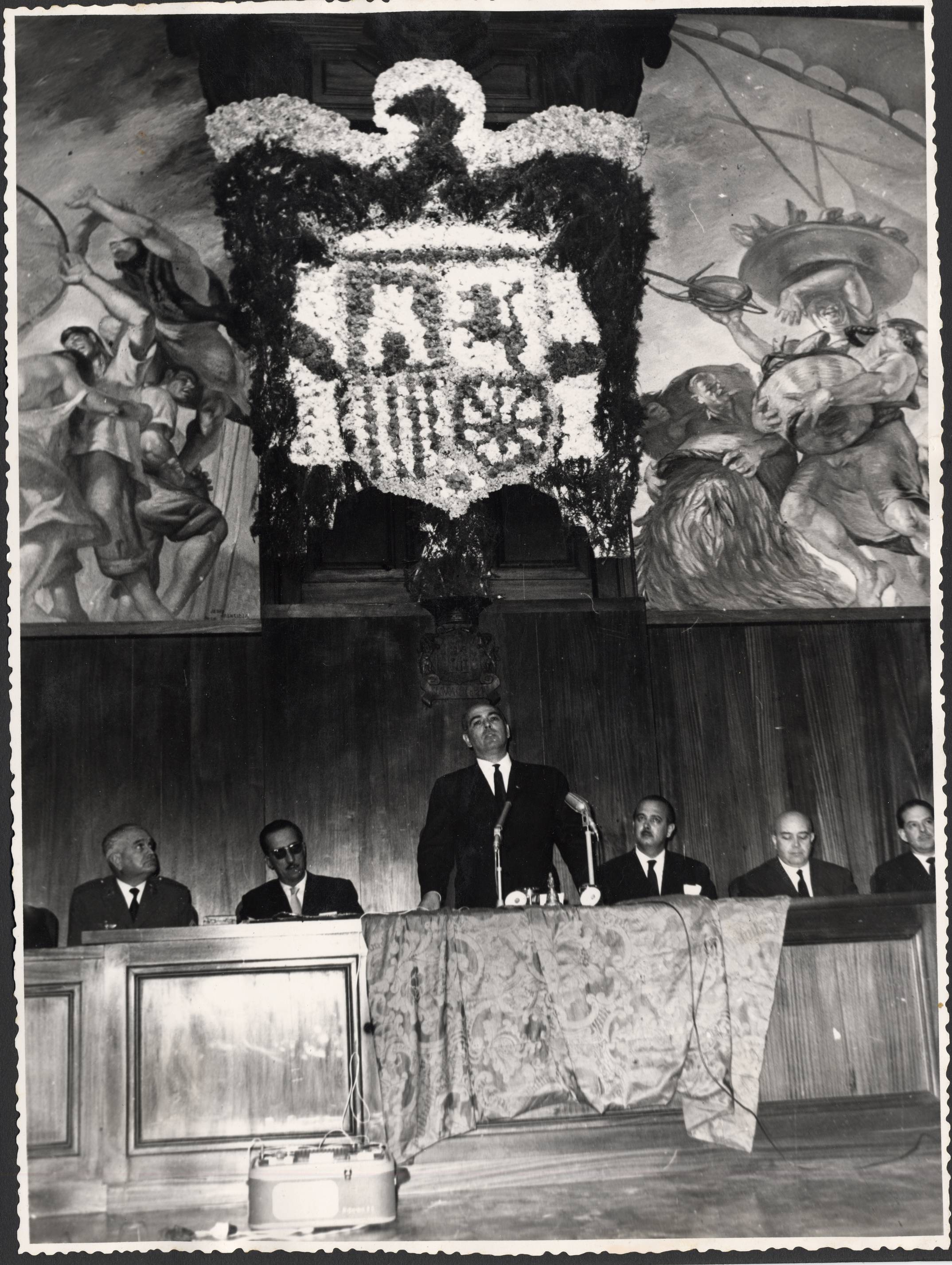
Solís in April 1962 delivering a speech on occasion of the 50th anniversary of the creation of the Cabildo of Gran Canaria.

In February 1957, he was appointed Secretary-General of the "Movement"; a position that he would juggle with his role as the national trade union representative for more than a decade. He was known for being the least dogmatic member of the Falangist sector. Solís embarked on the task of modernizing the "movement".Within the party he collaborated closely with Fernando Herrero Tejedor, who was the Deputy Secretary General of the Movement during the 1960s. His appointment as chief of the FET y de las JONS came shortly after the so-called "Crisis of February 1956". Solís encountered an antiquated party, a victim of the separation between the generation that made the civil war and the younger generations. In a short time, he drew up the draft law of principles of the national movement, which sought to provide a legal basis for the single party of the regime and would end up being approved in 1958. However, some historians have considered that this law actually meant the beginning of the end of the FET y de las JONS as a party, diluting the nationalism within the "movement".

Solís tried to assemble a nationalist project of an alternative regime to that of the Opus Dei technocrats. This project, which had already been partially employed in Labour Unions through an internal opening, was complemented by the creation of "associations" within the movement to equip the Franco regime with a certain level of popular participation in the so-called contrast of views. By October 1958 Solís had already created the National Delegation of Associations with the mission of "widening the bases of accession to the movement to collective groups" and to whose front he had appointed Manuel Fraga Iribarne. As Minister-Secretary General of the Movement, it was essential that the institutions of the Franco regime adapt to the social changes that were occurring in Spain, promoting a "political development" that complements economic growth. However, his association bill – which was already drawn up at the end of 1964 – was parked by the unmoving opposition of the Opus Dei technocrats, the undersecretary of President Luis Carrero Blanco and also by General Franco himself, with the fear that the "associations" could cause the reappearance of political parties. Solís continued to battle in this regard, and in the middle of 1969 he promoted a preliminary draft of the bases of the right of association, although again Franco did not want to promulgate it.

The great power that Solís held – single party, unions, "movement" press and radio – earned him the suspicions of many leaders in the regime. During these years, his work at the forefront of the single party was not without criticism from the most extreme sectors of Francoism, which accused Solís of keeping the party in a state of "total abandonment". He was also highly criticized for his management of the "movement" press, the set of newspapers and publications controlled by the regime. The “old guard” José Antonio Girón de Velasco came to say that Solís used the newspaper Pueblo, which in theory was the newspaper of the labour trade unions, as a means of communication in his personal service. However, Solís's main enemy among the Francoist hierarchy was Vice President Carrero Blanco.

During the second half of the 1960s, Solís fought to expand the political and economic competencies of the trade union organization. He also tried to promote the expansion of rights among the employees within enterprises, not within unions, an idea was viscerally rejected by entrepreneurs and some sectors of the government (particularly by Carrero Blanco). The matter of Franco's succession was another issue. With the appointment of Juan Carlos de Borbón as Franco's successor, Solis led a faction of the nationalist movement that preferred a dictator to a regency with no expiration date. Those in favor of regency, led by José Solís, intended to delay the return of the monarchy, but did not achieve its objective.

In October 1969, he was ousted from office. His downfall occurred in the context of the "Matesa scandal". In a movement that sought to discredit the technocrats of Opus Dei, the "movement"’s press (with the support of Ministers Manuel Fraga and José Solís) made a case of corruption, involving a businessman related to the Catholic institution, public. After the outbreak of the scandal there was a change of government. Paradoxically, Solís and Fraga were among the ministers who were fired. Opus Dei were reinforced by accepting the frank demands of Carrero Blanco in favour of a "united government without wear", which led to the so-called "one-party government". According to Bartolomé Bennassar, Solís was taken aback by his dismissal, as he believed he would have Franco's reassurances that he would remain in the cabinet. After this event, the importance of the Spanish trade union organization within the Government was diminished.

=== Return to Government ===
From June 1975, he once again occupied the position of Secretary General of the Movement in Franco's final government, after the accidental death of his predecessor Fernando Herrero Tejedor. However, by this time Solís had already left behind his previous liberal proposals. In October 1975 he was a prominent participant in the Sahara Crisis. With Franco seriously ill, on 21 October Solís travelled to Morocco to meet King Hassan II, to try and negotiate an exit and avoid direct conflict between the two countries. They would end up signing the Madrid Accords by which Spain left the territories of the Spanish Sahara, which were to be occupied by Morocco and Mauritania. (Note: Facing Solis's negotiating position, Foreign Minister Pedro Cortina was in favour of the self-determination of the Sahara.)

He formed part of the first government after the death of Franco as Minister of Labour, a position he held from 11 December 1975 to 7 July 1976. Some authors have suggested that this appointment was partially in recognition of his previous participation in the negotiations with Morocco. However, the labour situation Solís found was very complicated. The Spanish economy had weakened significantly due to the effects of the oil crisis of 1973. During the first months of 1976, the opposition's trade union forces embarked on an important campaign of mobilizations and strikes, with a total of 17,731 strikes. In this context, the Vitoria massacre occurred, during which several workers were killed by police repression. Solís retired from his post following the end of the Arias government in July 1976. He has since abandoned political life to focus on business activity. He died at his home in Madrid on 20 May 1990 and was buried in his hometown.

== Personal life ==
He married Ana María Rodríguez Sedano-Bosch, with whom he had fourteen children.

Solís collaborated with his friend Colonel Enrique Herrera Marín – Spain's military attaché in Buenos Aires – on the steps of the transfer of exiled Argentine President Juan Domingo Perón. In 1961 Perón finally settled on Spanish soil with the assistance of the Francoist government.

During the years of dictatorship, Solís became president of the International Committee for the Defense of Christian Civilization.

== Works ==
- —— (1955). Nuestro sindicalismo. Madrid.
- —— (1959). Nueva convivencia española. Madrid.
- —— (1961). José Antonio: actualidad de su doctrina.
- —— (1963). La gran realidad de nuestro fuero del trabajo. Madrid.
- —— (1975). España. Su Monarquía y su futuro. Barcelona.

== Awards ==
- Medalla de Plata al Mérito en el Trabajo (1947)
- Gran Cruz de la Orden de Cisneros (1953)
- Gran Cruz de la Orden Civil de Alfonso X el Sabio (1956)
- Gran Cruz de la Orden del Mérito Militar (1959)Gran Cruz de la Orden Imperial del Yugo y las Flechas (1961)
- Gran Cruz (con distintivo blanco) del Mérito Naval (1962)
- Gran Cruz de la Orden de Isabel la Católica (1962)
- Gran Cruz de la Orden Civil del Mérito Agrícola (1962)
- Gran Cruz de la Orden de San Raimundo de Peñafort (1963)
- Gran Cruz (con distintivo blanco) de la Orden del Mérito Aeronáutico (1967)
- Gran Cruz de la Orden de Carlos III (1969)
- Medalla de Oro al Mérito en el Trabajo (1973)
- Gran Cruz de la Orden de San Hermenegildo (1975)
- Collar de la Orden de Isabel la Católica (1976)

== Bibliography ==
- Algueró Cuervo, José Ignacio (2006). El Sahara y España. Claves de una descolonización pendiente. Idea.
- Alvar Ezquerra, Jaime (2001). Diccionario de historia de España. Tres Cantos (Madrid): Istmo. ISBN 84-7090-366-7.
- Armas Marcelo, J.J. (2008). Celebración de la intemperie. Plaza & Janés.
- Aróstegui, Julio; Marco, Jorge (2008). El último frente: la resistencia armada antifranquista en España, 1939–1952. Madrid: Los Libros de la Catarata.
- Aschmann, Birgit (1999). "Treue Freunde..."?: Westdeutschland und Spanien, 1945 bis 1963 (in German). Stuttgart: Franz Steiner Verlag.
- Amaya Quer, Àlex (2012). "Resumen de "Unidad, totalidad y jerarquía": continuidades y rupturas en la teoría y la praxis de la organización sindical española, 1939–1969". Historia y Política (28). Madrid: Universidad Complutense de Madrid, Universidad Nacional de Educación a Distancia y Centro de Estudios Políticos y Constitucionales: 305–331. ISSN 1575-0361.
- Barea López, Oscar (2014). Heráldica y genealogía en el sureste de Córdoba (SS. XIII-XIX). Madrid: Bubok Publishing S.L. ISBN 978-84-686-6224-4.
- Barreda, Mikel (2006). La Democracia española: realidades y desafíos. Análisis del sistema político español. Barcelona: UOC.
- Bennassar, Bartolomé (1996) [1995]. Franco. Clío. Crónicas de la historia. Madrid: EDAF. ISBN 978-84-414-0061-0.
- Casanova, Julián; Gil Andrés, Carlos; Douch, Martin (2014) [2009]. Twentieth-century Spain: a history. Cambridge: Cambridge University Press. ISBN 978-1-107-01696-5.
- Cazorla Sánchez, Antonio (2000). Las políticas de la victoria: la consolidación del Nuevo Estado franquista, 1938-1953. Historia. Estudios. Madrid: Marcial Pons. ISBN 978-84-95379-19-1.
- del Arco, Manuel (1970). Los 90 ministros de Franco. Madrid: Dopesa.
- Gallego, Ferran; Morente Valero, Francisco (2005). Fascismo en España: ensayos sobre los orígenes sociales y culturales del franquismo. Barcelona: El viejo topo. ISBN 978-84-96356-32-0.
- Gil Pecharromán, Julio (2008). Con permiso de la autoridad: la España de Franco (1939-1975). Historia (1 ed.). Madrid: Temas de Hoy. ISBN 978-84-8460-693-2.
- Gómez Roda, J. Alberto (2004). Comisiones obreras y la represión franquista. Universidad de Valencia.
- Hebenstreit, Maria (2014). La Oposición al Franquismo en Puerto de Sagunto (1958–1977). Universidad de Valencia.
- Lewis, Paul H. (2002). Latin Fascist Elites: The Mussolini, Franco, and Salazar Regimes. Greenwood publishing group.
- Marín, José María; Molinero, Carme; Ysàs, Pere (2010) [2001]. Historia política de España, 1939–2000. Vol. II. Madrid: Istmo.
- Mateos, Abdón; Soto Carmona, Alvaro (1997). El final del franquismo, 1959-1975: la transformación de la sociedad española. Historia de España (1 ed.). Madrid: Historia 16 Temas de Hoy. ISBN 978-84-7679-326-8.
- Michonneau, Stéphane; Núñez Seixas, Xosé M. (2014). Imaginarios y representaciones de España durante el franquismo. Collection de la Casa de Velázquez. Madrid: Casa de Velázquez. ISBN 978-84-15636-65-6.
- Míguez, Santiago (1990). La preparación de la transición a la democracia en España. Universidad de Zaragoza.
- Moradiellos, Enrique (2000). La España de Franco, 1939-1975: política y sociedad (in Spanish). Síntesis. ISBN 978-84-7738-740-4.
- Morcillo, Aurora G. (2010). The Seduction of Modern Spain. The Female Body and the Francoist Body Politic. Rosemont Publishing. ISBN 978-0-8387-5753-6.
- Muñoz Soro, Javier (2013). ""Presos de las palabras". Republicanismo y populismo falangista en los años sesenta". In Ruiz Carnicer, Miguel Angel; Institución "Fernando el Católico," (eds.). Falange: las culturas políticas del fascismo en la España de Franco (1936-1975). Actas. Historia. Zaragoza: Institución "Fernando el Católico,". ISBN 978-84-9911-216-9.
- Payne, Stanley G. (1999). Fascism in Spain, 1923–1977. University of Wisconsin Press. ISBN 978-0299165642. OCLC 1057995404.
- Powell, Charles (2007). "El reformismo centrista y la transición democrática: retos y respuestas". Historia y Política (18). Madrid: Universidad Complutense de Madrid, Universidad Nacional de Educación a Distancia y Centro de Estudios Políticos y Constitucionales: 49–82. ISSN 1575-0361.
- Preston, Paul (1995) [1990]. Politics of Revenge: Fascism and the Military in 20th-century Spain. Hoboken: Taylor and Francis. ISBN 978-0-203-40037-1.
- Rein, Raanan (1995). La salvación de una dictadura: alianza Franco-Perón 1946-1955. Biblioteca de historia. Madrid: Consejo superior de Investigaciones científicas. ISBN 978-84-00-07505-7.
- Rodríguez Puértolas, Julio (2008). Historia de la literatura fascista española. Vol. II. Akal.
- Sesma Landrín, Nicolás (1 January 2005). "El republicanismo en la cultura política falangista : de la Falange fundacional al modelo de la V República francesa". Espacio Tiempo y Forma. Serie V, Historia Contemporánea. 0 (18). Madrid: Universidad Nacional de Educación a Distancia: 261–283. doi:10.5944/etfv.18.2006.3133. ISSN 1130-0124.
- Soto Carmona, Álvaro (1 January 1995). "Auge y caída de la organización sindical española". Espacio Tiempo y Forma. Serie V, Historia Contemporánea (8). Madrid: Universidad Nacional de Educación a Distancia: 247–276. doi:10.5944/etfv.8.1995.2903. ISSN 2340-1451.
- Urquijo Goitia, José Ramón (2008) [2001]. Gobiernos y ministros españoles en la edad contemporánea. Madrid: CSIC.
