= Jesús Rubio García-Mina =

Spanish politician (1908–1976)

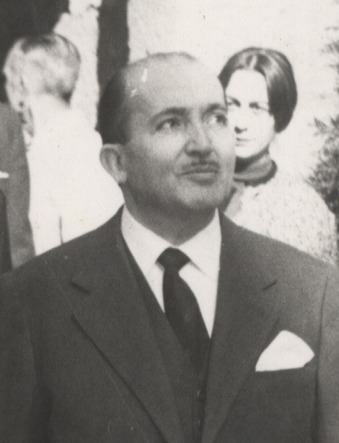

Minister of National Education of Spain
- In office 15 February 1956 – 11 July 1962
- Prime Minister: Francisco Franco
- Preceded by: Joaquín Ruiz-Giménez
- Succeeded by: Manuel Lora-Tamayo

Personal details
- Born: Jesús Rubio García-Mina; 15 August 1908 Pamplona, Navarre, Kingdom of Spain
- Died: 13 July 1976 (aged 67) Madrid, Spanish State
- Party: FET y de las JONS (National Movement)

Jesús Rubio García-Mina (15 August 1908 – 13 July 1976) was a Spanish politician who served as Minister of National Education of Spain between 1956 and 1962, during the Francoist dictatorship.
