= Mariano Navarro Rubio =

Spanish politician (1913–2001)

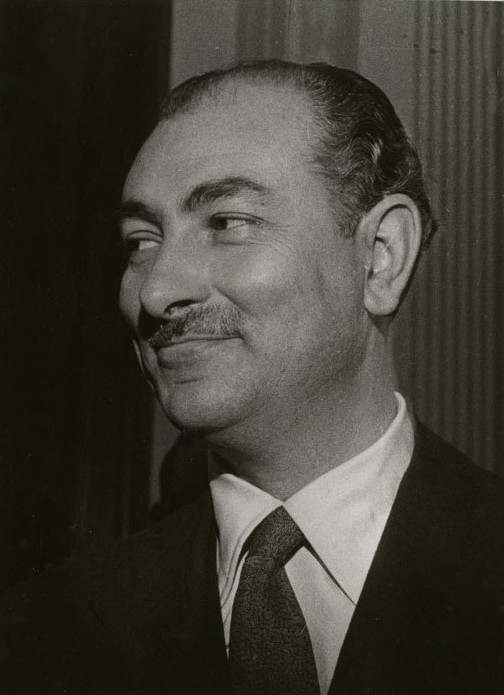

Minister of Finance of Spain
- In office 25 February 1957 – 8 July 1965
- Prime Minister: Francisco Franco
- Preceded by: Francisco Gómez de Llano
- Succeeded by: Juan José Espinosa San Martín

Personal details
- Born: Mariano Navarro Rubio; 13 November 1913 Burbáguena, Kingdom of Spain
- Died: 3 November 2001 (aged 87) Madrid, Spain
- Party: Opus Dei (National Movement)

Mariano Navarro Rubio (14 November 1913 – 3 November 2001) was a Spanish politician who served as minister of finance between 1957 and 1965, during the Francoist dictatorship. He was a member of the Opus Dei.
