= José María Martínez Sánchez-Arjona =

Spanish politician (1905–1977)

Minister of Housing
- In office 21 April 1960 – 30 October 1969
- Prime Minister: Francisco Franco
- Preceded by: Pedro Gual Villalbí (acting)
- Succeeded by: Vicente Mortes

Personal details
- Born: José María Martínez Sánchez-Arjona; 7 February 1905 Requena, Kingdom of Spain
- Died: 19 December 1977 (aged 72) Madrid, Spain
- Party: FET y de las JONS

José María Martínez Sánchez-Arjona (7 February 1905 – 19 December 1977) was a Spanish politician who served as Minister of Housing between 1960 and 1969, during the Francoist dictatorship.
