= Gregorio López-Bravo =

Spanish politician

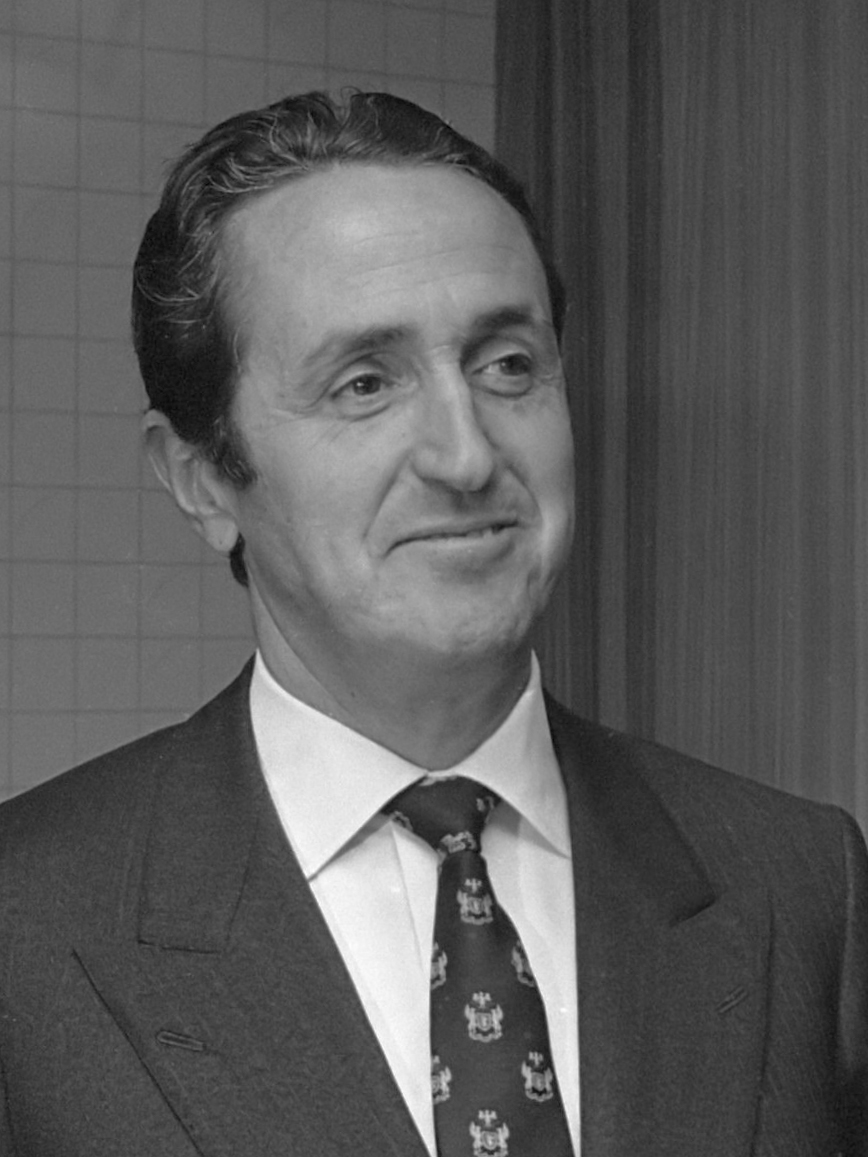
Gregorio López-Bravo y Castro (1972)

Gregorio López-Bravo y Castro (29 December 1923 in Madrid, Spain – 19 February 1985 in Bilbao, Spain) was a Spanish politician who served as Minister of Foreign Affairs between 1969 and 1973. He also served as the Minister of Industry. He was a member of the Opus Dei. He died in the Mount Oiz plane crash.
