= Antonio Iturmendi Bañales =

Spanish politician

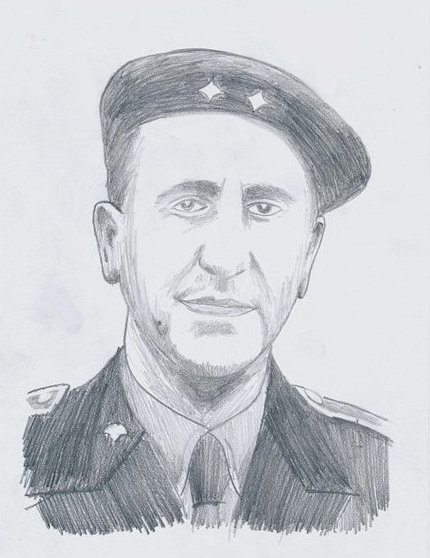
- Born: Antonio Iturmendi Bañales; 1903; Baracaldo, Spain
- Died: 1976 (aged 72–73); Madrid, Spain
- Occupation: lawyer
- Known for: politician
- Political party: Traditionalist Communion, Falange Española Tradicionalista

Antonio Iturmendi Bañales (1903–1976) was a Spanish Carlist and Francoist politician. He is best known as the Minister of Justice, serving in 1951–1965, as the Cortes speaker, serving in 1965–1969; he held the parliamentarian ticket between 1949 and 1976. He is also noted as briefly a civil governor and Tarragona and Zaragoza provinces in 1939. Though not counted among key decision-makers of the Francoist regime, he is considered instrumental in thwarting the Falangist attempt to redefine the system in the mid-1950s, and in the process of implementing the Alfonsist restoration in the 1960s.

== Family and youth ==
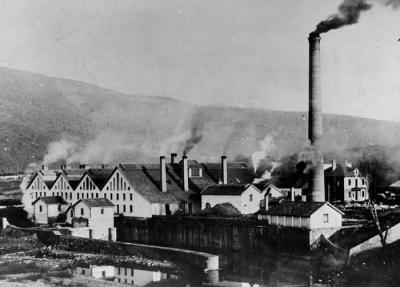
Baracaldo, early 20. c.

The Iturmendi family originated from the Navarrese town of Morentín was first noted in the mid-16th century. It got very branched, though none of its representatives got particularly distinguished. The best-known family member was Emeterio Celedonio Iturmendi Barbarín (1812-1883), a military who became an icon of Carlist insurgency; he took part in all three Carlist wars (1833-8, 1849, 1873–6) and grew to general. He was also the brother of Antonio's great-grandfather. Either the grandfather or the father of Antonio moved to Baracaldo on the Biscay coast; the latter, José Iturmendi López (1873-1955), was educated in jurisprudence and worked as a lawyer for almost half a century. In the mid-1920s he was president of Consejo Judicial of Banco Vasco and as such was involved in negotiations over Concierto Económico, periodical financial arrangements between the provincial Biscay self-government and Madrid. In the mid-1930s he became the dean of Colegio de Abogados of the Biscay province, the position held until death. Iturmendi López married Julia Bañales Menchaca (1881-1962); the couple had 11 children, 7 sons and 4 daughters.

Like his siblings, Antonio was raised in a profoundly Catholic ambience; he started education at the Doctrina Cristiana and Sagrados Corazones schools, where he obtained the baccalaureate. At unspecified time though probably around the year of 1920 he entered facultad de derecho at Universidad de Deusto, the prestigious Bilbao-based high school founded by the Jesuit Order. It is at Deusto that he graduated in law; exact date is not clear and probably fell on the mid-1920s. In 1924 Iturmendi settled his affairs with the army and in 1926 he was nominated abogado de estado, the state juridical service. The same year he successfully passed entry exams to Instituto Reus and commenced law practice in Delegación de Hacienda in Castellón, though already in 1927 he was transferred to Logroño. At unspecified time in the late 1920s Iturmendi returned to his native Biscay when posted to Bilbao.

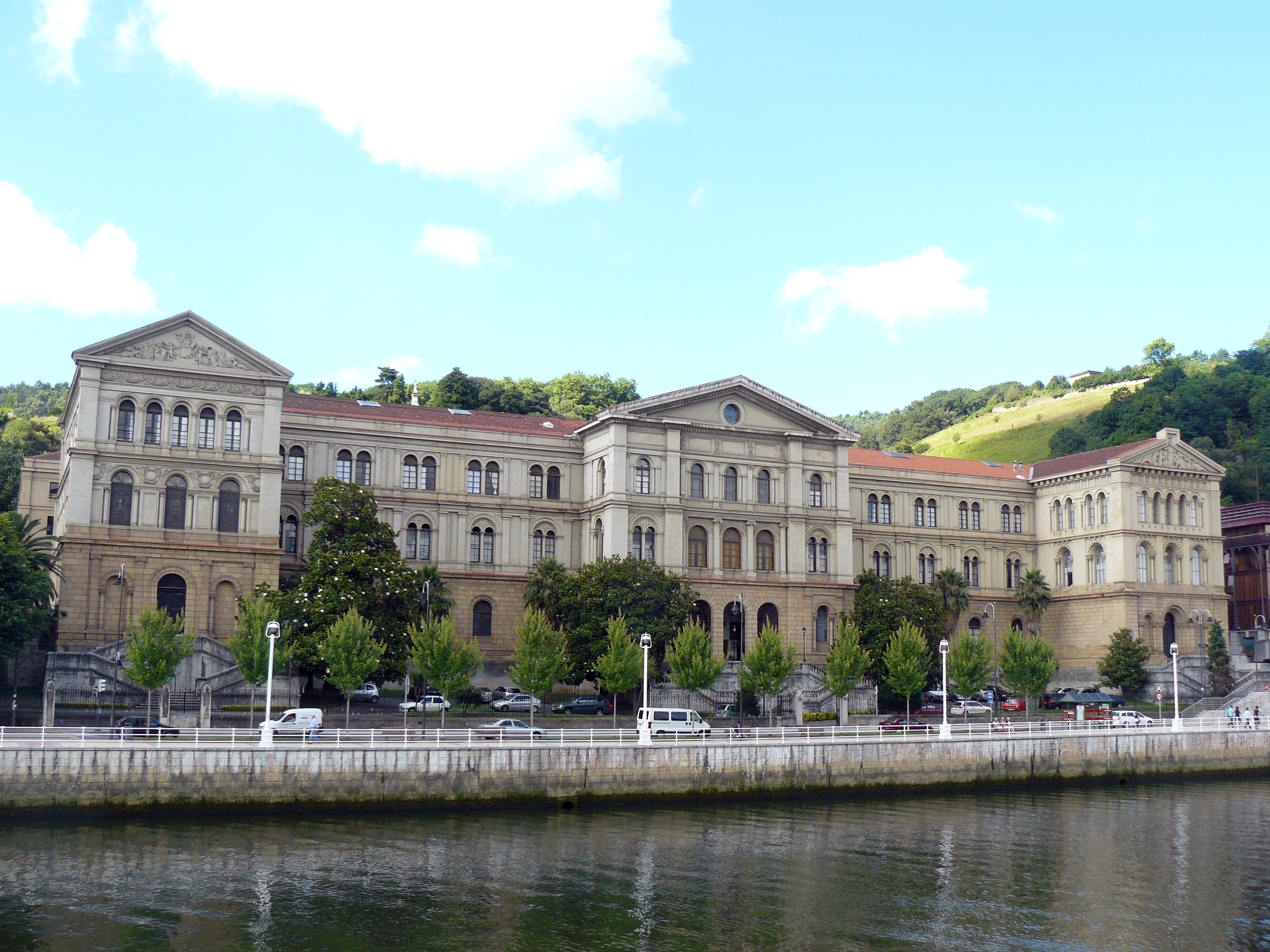
Deusto University, current view

In 1927 Iturmendi married Rita Gómez Nales (1900-1983), a Mexico-born girl from an indiano family; none of the sources consulted provides any information on her family except that they resided in Madrid. The couple settled in Bilbao. Antonio and Rita had 5 children: María Teresa, María del Pilár, María de los Angeles, Antonio and Javier Iturmendi Gómez Nales. None of them became a public figure, though Maria Teresa married Alfonso Osorio García, a Francoist and later a Christian-Democrat politician, deputy prime minister in the Suarez government. Some of Antonio's grandchildren, especially from the Osorio Iturmendi and the Iturmendi Mac-Lellan families, are high corporative executives. One Iturmendi's brother was a locally recognized lawyer and another was a military. Antonio's nephew, José Iturmendi Morales, became a scholar in jurisprudence and for 20 years until 2008 served as dean of the Law Department at Universidad Complutense in Madrid, considered one of key Spanish iusnaturalists. Antonio's niece, Juana Iturmendi Maguregui, is a Partido Popular politician and served in the Senate during the 2009–2011 term.

== Bilbao: from abogado to deputy mayor ==
Carlist standard

Close to nothing is known about Iturmendi's public engagements of the late 1920s and early 1930s, except that he continued exercising as abogado del estado in Bilbao. At unspecified time he became asesor juridico for the provincial Biscay self-government and it is likely that in this role he met Esteban Bilbao, the friend of his father and during primoderiverista period the president of the Biscay diputación; Bilbao was to become Iturmendi's lifetime political patron and Iturmendi turned his protégé and successor. In the early 1930s Iturmendi continued as a lawyer; during Dictablanda he worked with his father in the same office, but in the Republican period he set up an office of his own. None of the sources consulted clearly notes him as involved in any political activity. Later works and press notes referred to Iturmendi as a Carlist and Traditionalist, though it is not confirmed that like Esteban Bilbao he joined Traditionalist Communion or otherwise engaged in Carlist initiatives. An apparently well-known Iturmendi was recorded as involved in Acción Popular in the Biscay countryside, though it is not clear whether the person is question was Antonio, his father or any other family member.

There is no data available related to Iturmendi's stand prior and shortly after the July 1936 coup. It is not known whether he was involved in the Carlist conspiracy, where he resided during the outbreak of the Civil War and what his fate was in the next few months. In August 1936 José Iturmendi showed up in Burgos and publicly declared adhesion to the military Junta, yet a corresponding press note did not mention Antonio as accompanying his father. He reportedly accepted the Unification Decree of April 1937 and was among these Carlists who readily joined the new Francoist state party, Falange Española Tradicionalista, though the first confirmed information on his whereabouts comes from December 1937. Recommended by Esteban Bilbao, Iturmendi was nominated into a 3-member Comisión Liquidadora; once the Nationalists scrapped all separate provincial Biscay arrangements, especially Concierto Económico, the body was entrusted with engineering their legal handover to the central administration and it completed the task within few months.

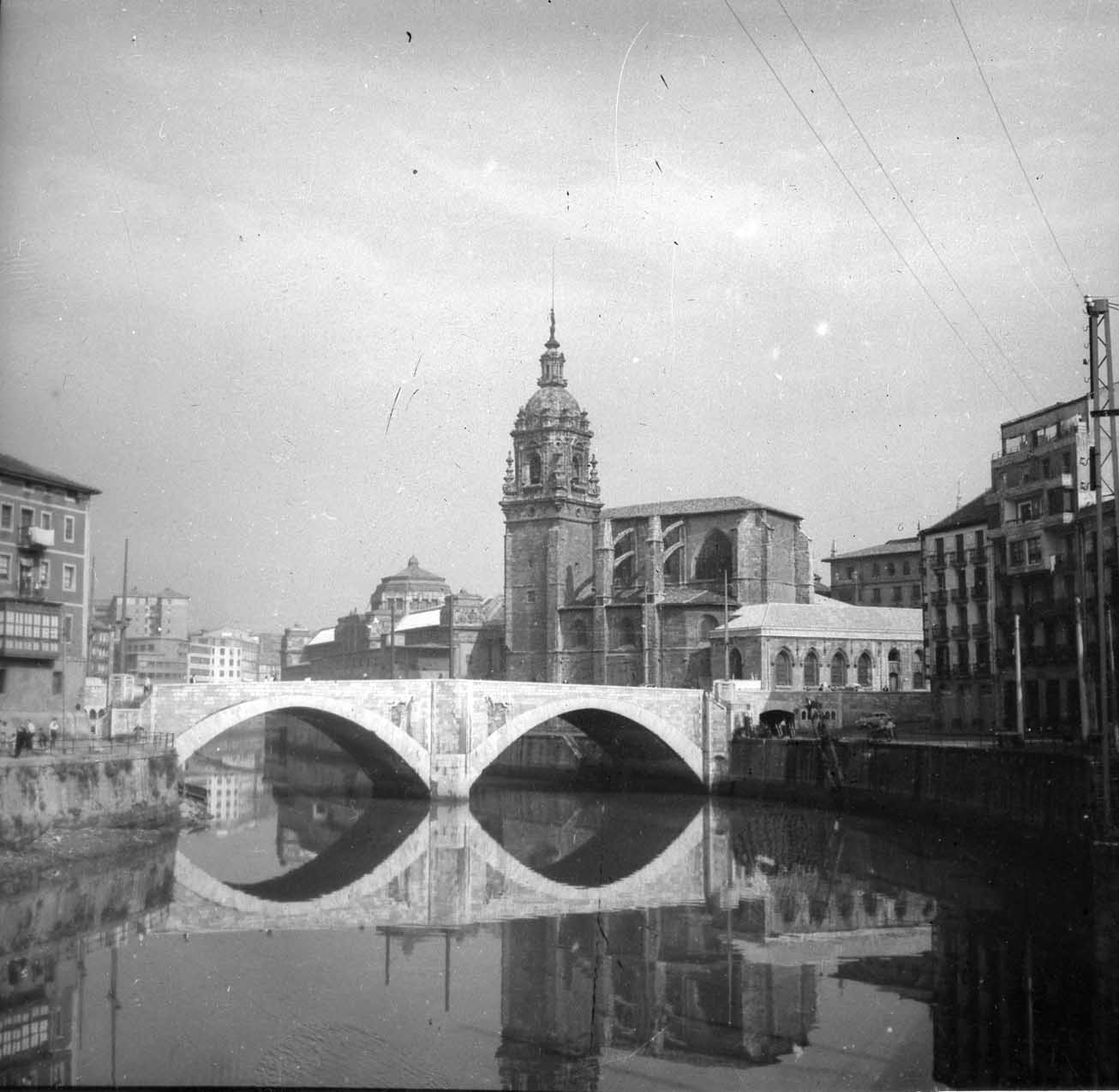
Bilbao

Also the next Iturmendi's assignment kept him busy in Bilbao. In August 1938 the Nationalist Ministry of Interior appointed the 3rd municipal administration, headed by José Lequerica; in a trademark Francoist move of balancing various political groupings, as a tractable Carlist Iturmendi was nominated primero teniente de alcalde, de facto the deputy mayor of the city. He became president of the Economic and Budgetary Commission and entered executive boards of commercial companies controlled by the city, e.g. he joined Junta de Gobierno of Caja de Ahorros de Bilbao. None of the sources consulted provides any detailed information on his activity in the town hall; it is neither clear when exactly he ceased. Most sources note that in January 1939 he was posted to a new job in Catalonia; however, some works list Iturmendi as member of the Bilbao administration until March 1939.

== Rise and demise ==
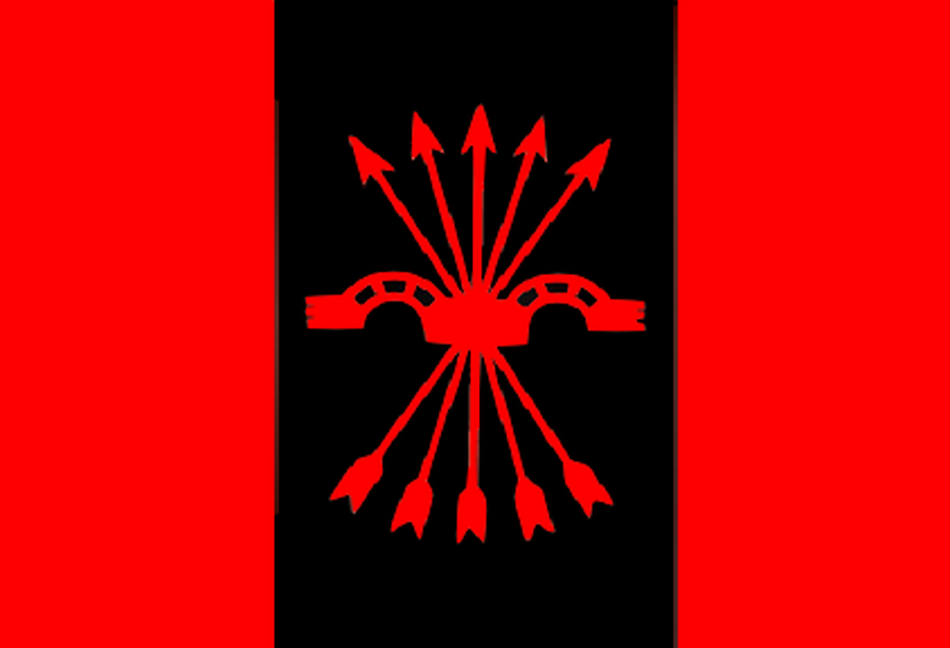
Falangist standard

In January 1939 Iturmendi was nominated the first Francoist gobernador civil in Tarragona. He is noted as involved in anti-Republican purges; officials deemed "anti-patriotic" were to be removed or suspended. Iturmendi was also recorded for his role during a conflict related to cardenal Vidal Barraquer. Furious about the archbishop's neutralist stance, Franco was determined to prevent his return to Tarragona; Iturmendi helped to outmaneuver the provisional papal nominee, Francesc Vives, and greatly contributed to final defeat of the Vatican's diplomacy in their struggle to reinstate Vidal. In March 1939 Iturmendi was transferred to civil governor position in Zaragoza, which he held for 5 months. Again, he is noted as the one whose hand "did not tremble" when dealing with officials suspected of lack of enthusiasm for the new regime.

In August 1939 Iturmendi ceased as the Zaragoza governor and was nominated head of Dirección General de Administración Local within the Ministry of Interior; the job presented him with enormous powers as he became responsible for these local nominations which were not reserved for the Minister or civil governors. Indeed, he cautiously endorsed Carlists in ranks of the local officials, noted for promoting his fellow Traditionalists in Vic, Valencia or Bilbao. He also organized from scratch Cuerpo de Funcionarios of the local administration and founded a dedicated school named Instituto de Estudios de Administración Local, serving at the same time as its vice-president.

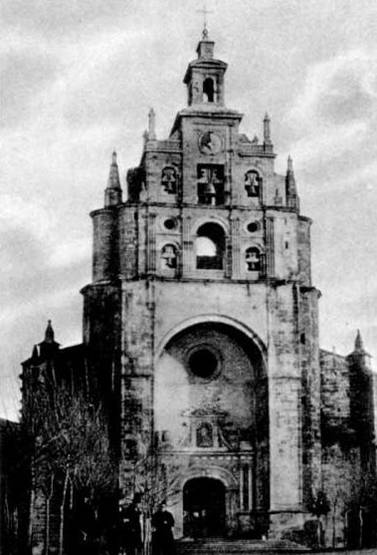
Basilica de Begoña

In September 1939 Iturmendi was appointed to the second Consejo Nacional of Falange; according to some scholars he represented the Carlist "colaboracionistas", who replaced Carlist "duros". Others count him among the hardline Falangist "blandos" and note that Iturmendi in public appeared in the black party uniform. As before taking seat in Consejo he did not seek authorization from the Carlist regent-claimant Don Javier, the latter expelled him from Comunión Tradicionalista. Undeterred, Iturmendi continued in Francoist structures. In May 1941 he ceased at Administración Local and was appointed sub-secretary in Ministry of Interior. Political background of the change remains disputed; according to one scholar Iturmendi was promoted by the new minister Valentín Galarza as part of his offensive against Serrano Suñer; another account has it that Serrano was Iturmendi's "mentor".

Iturmendi's position versus Carlism remained ambiguous. On the one hand, as high official of the Interior he monitored the intransigent party activists and denounced some as "aliadofilos". On the other, in late 1941 he visited the Falangist secretario general and demanded that Traditionalists are no longer isolated and marginalized. He maintained relations with collaborative Carlists; in August 1942 he was present during a sermon to honor the Carlist dead, which later became known as the Begoña incident. Iturmendi emerged unhurt yet he was furious about the hardline Falangism. In protest he resigned his seat in Consejo Nacional; shortly afterwards he ceased as sub-secretary in the Interior. It is not clear whether the dismissal was related to his resignation; some scholars claim that on the contrary, he was fired as part of the anti-Serranista purges in the ministry.

== From sidelines back to power ==
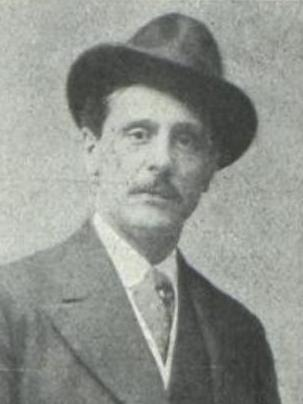
Esteban Bilbao

In late 1942 Iturmendi was not reappointed to the new Consejo Nacional and he found himself on the sidelines of official politics; according to some scholars he commenced the period of "largo ostracismo", which was to last until the end of the decade. Politically he seemed bewildered, vacillating between Javierista Carlism, Juanista Carlism, Carloctavismo and Francoism. In 1943 together with orthodox Carlist leaders he signed a letter to Franco; the signatories demanded that totalitarian features of the regime are removed and traditional institutions are brought back. Some authors claim that in 1944 Iturmendi returned to Comunión Tradicionalista, allegedly because he sensed that after the Allied takeover of Western Europe the end of Francoism was near. However, almost at the same time Iturmendi was reportedly engaged in drafting a political manifesto of the Alfonsist claimant Don Juan; it materialized in 1946 as Bases Institucionales de la Monarquía Española. Some scholars claim that the 1946 Ley de Sucesión partially acknowledged the Juanista proposal. Others suggest rather that it might have been written with the Carloctavista claimant in mind; together with Esteban Bilbao, Iturmendi emerged as one of the best known supporters of Karl Pius Habsburgo-Lorena. As at the time it appeared that Carloctavistas enjoyed some cautious backing of the regime it might have seemed that Iturmendi took part in a Francoist plot to install a puppet king. Indeed, he started to regain position in officialdom; in 1947 he was appointed to the new Consejo Nacional of Falange and as its member he automatically gained seat in the third Francoist Cortes, assembled in 1949.

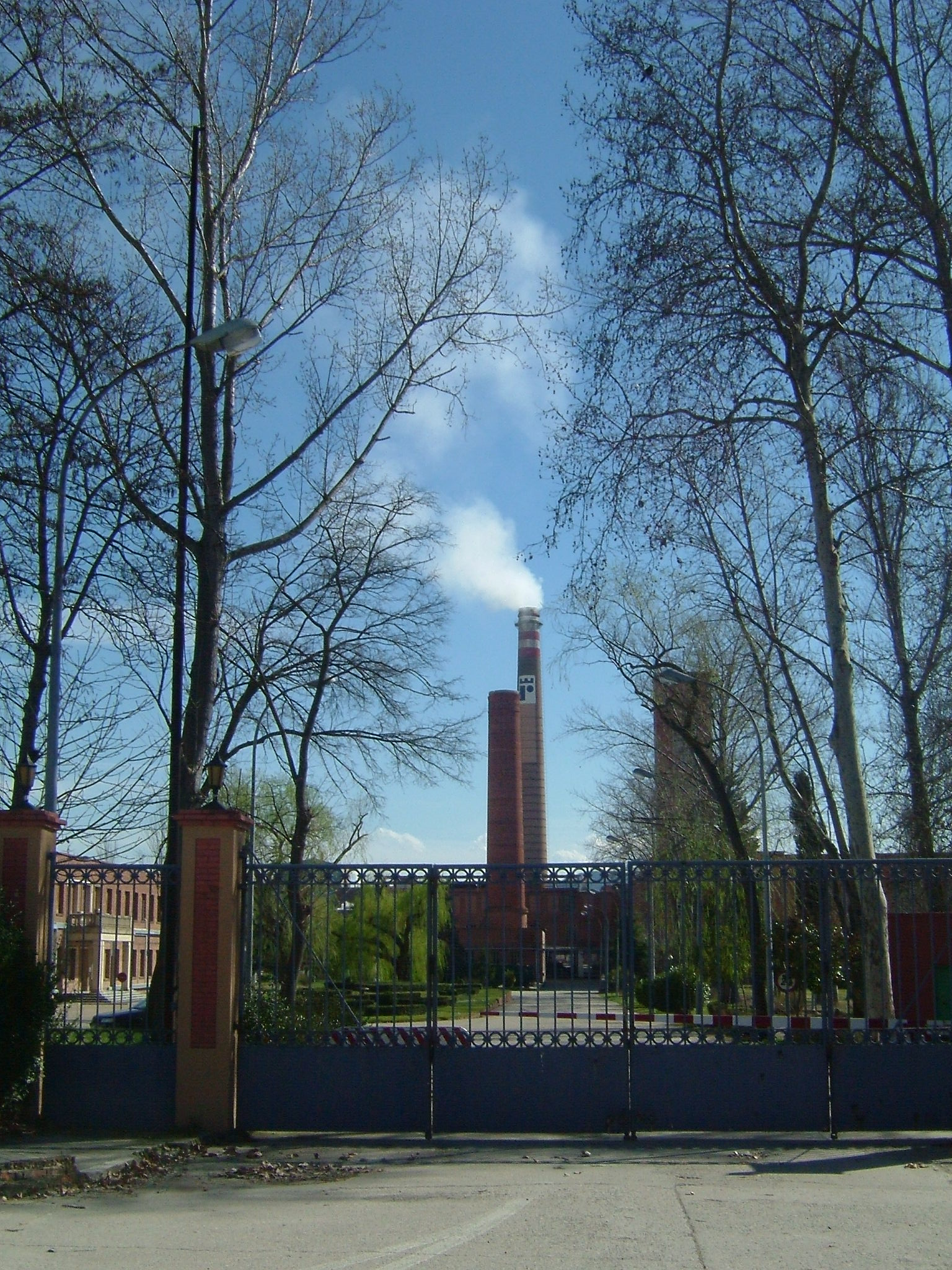
former FEFASA

Though not holding important political positions throughout most of the 1940s, Iturmendi did not entirely fall out of grace. At unspecified time in the mid-1940s he was appointed president of the executive board of Fabricación Española de Fibras Textiles Artificiales, the company created within the Instituto Nacional de Industria framework in Miranda de Ebro. As part of the Francoist plan of reaching full economic independence, FEFASA was tasked with launching production of synthetic fiber; though based on German technology, the bid was not successful before Iturmendi ceased as president. Other commercial enterprises he engaged in were Pola and Nervión, two Bilbao-based insurance companies where he worked as consejero. Iturmendi resumed also the law practice, though not in Bilbao but in Madrid; he served as abogado del estado before various Tribunales in the capital. He engaged also in more ambitious juridical activities. In a move hardly compatible with his earlier work in Liquidadora, he took part in works developing legal infrastructure for semi-autonomous governance which would incorporate some fuerista establishments into the civil code. They climaxed in Congreso Nacional de Derecho Civil in Zaragoza in 1946; its resolutions paved the way for a 1947 decree, which in turned enabled further works. They were to continue grudgingly throughout decades and ultimately turned out to be a failure, yet even 20 years later Iturmendi considered them vital for Spanish legal system.

== Minister of Justice ==
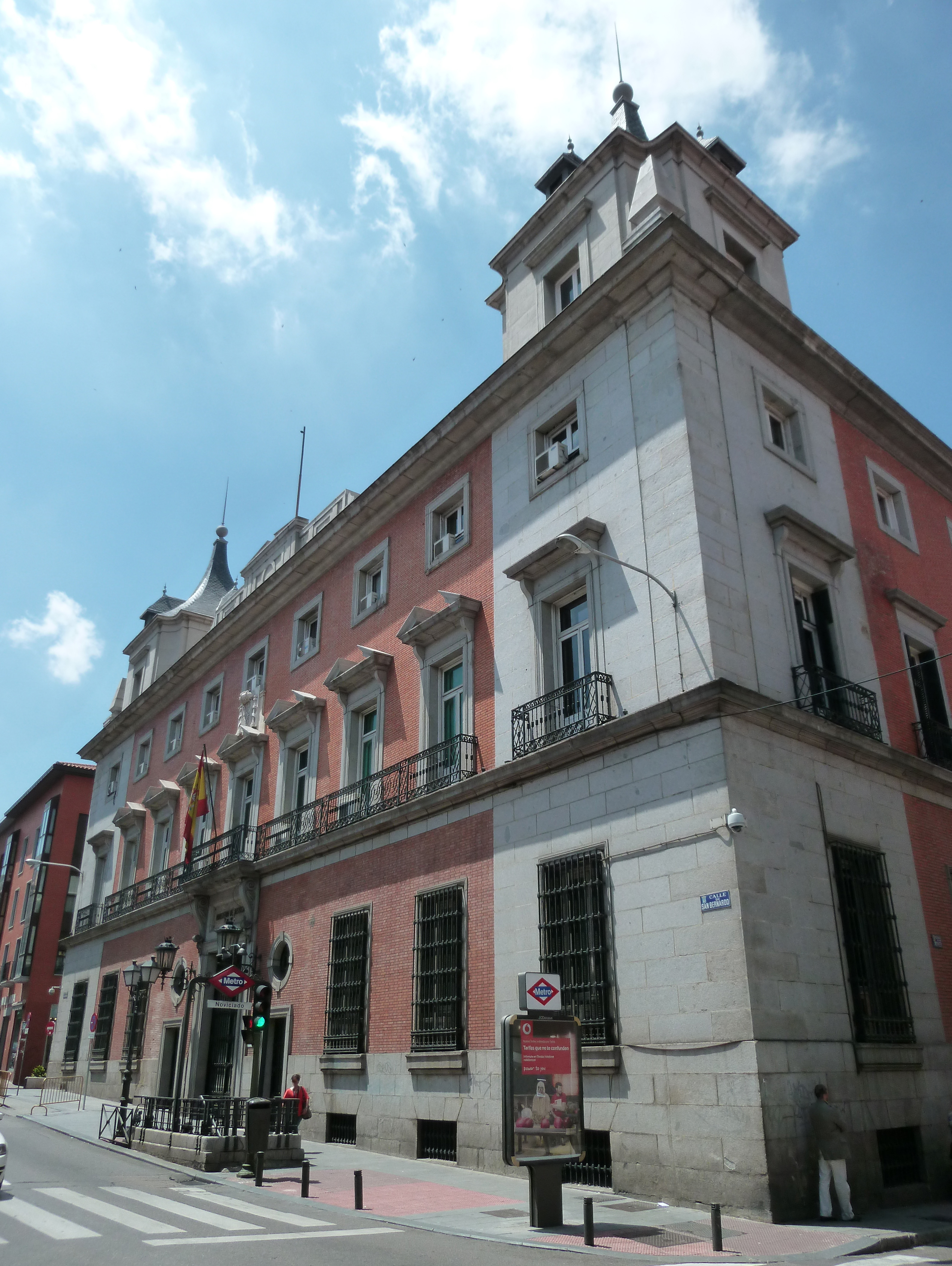
Ministry of Justice, current view

Since the late 1940s reinstated in official structures, Iturmendi rose to governmental strata when in 1951 he was nominated Minister of Justice. None of the sources consulted provides any details on mechanism of his appointment except that it was part of the Franco's balancing game and that Iturmendi followed in the footsteps of Esteban Bilbao. His term turned out to be one of the longest ministerial tenures in the Francoist Spain and lasted 14 years until 1965; until today Iturmendi remains also the longest serving Spanish minister of justice in the entire history. Moreover, during his tenure he was also many times and for short few-day periods double-hatting as a caretaker minister for Public Works, Economy, Education, Labor and Information.

By the time Iturmendi took office the regime had already mitigated its terror; also the basic Francoist legislation had already been in place. Iturmendi focused on regulations which stabilized the system further on. He soon announced his determination to do away with administrative defects of the juridical system, and then contributed to fine-tuning of the Civil Code, Ley de Jurisdicción Contencioso-Administrativa, Ley de Sociedales de Responsabilidad Limitada, Ley de Expropriación Forzosa, Ley de Venta de Bienes and Ley de Adopción. He was also chief engineer behind the concept of dual citizenship, shared by Spain and Latin American states and gradually implemented throughout the 1950s. Some scholars claim that Iturmendi's Traditionalist leaning contributed to further restrictions on public morality, like the 1956 regulations which officially delegalized prostitution or the 1958 law aimed against homosexuals. One of his final ministerial initiatives was setting up Juzgado y Tribunal de Orden Publico; in 1963 the body replaced the obsolete Tribunal Especial para la Represión de la Masonería y el Comunismo and was designed to handle high-profile political cases. In 1963 he admitted to 610 political prisoners in Spain.

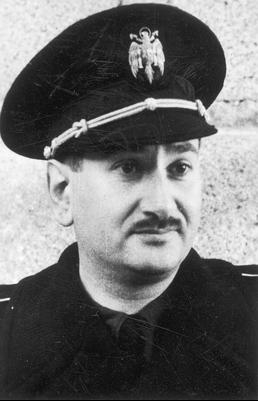
Arrese

When discussing his governmental career many scholars do not focus on Iturmendi's ministerial work but single out his stand during the 1956 crisis, when Falange hardliners led by Arrese produced the last serious attempt to convert the regime into a totalitarian system. Since 1947 continuously member of the Falangist Consejo Nacional, in 1955 Iturmendi was appointed to a party committee entrusted with drafting the law. First he tried to water it down during internal works of the committee but failed. Then as minister of justice he wrote to Franco arguing against the proposal once it had already landed on dictator's desk; Iturmendi claimed that if accepted, it would build a Soviet-style regime like these of the USSR, Poland, Yugoslavia or China. He declared that only the monarchy might prevent "tyranny of inorganic democracy" and presented his own set of legislative proposals, aimed to build "Estado do Derecho"; according to some scholars they were drafted by López Rodo. Forming a common front with the monarchists and the military Iturmendi emerged successful; the climax led to the cabinet reshuffle, sidetracking of Arrese and adoption of a vague Ley de Principios del Movimiento Nacional.

== Monarchist ==
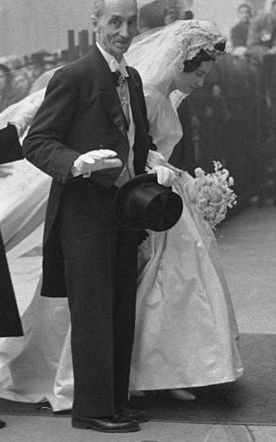
Don Javier

Iturmendi vacillated between a few political monarchist groupings active in the Francoist Spain. According to some scholars the 1953 death of Karl Pius and the apparent collapse of Carloctavismo left him disoriented. In the mid-1950s he reportedly intended "to act as intermediary" between the Carlist claimant Don Javier and Franco and a few Javierista politicians indeed considered him an acceptable partner; some historians claim that Carlist adoption of a new, collaborative strategy towards the regime might have been influenced by Iturmendi. However, others note that Iturmendi remained entirely loyal to the dictator and was even prepared to lead a new Carlist organisation sponsored by the regime and with the sole purpose to distract and fragment the Traditionalists. In the 1950s Iturmendi as the minister of justice a few times met Don Javier and always demanded that the latter tunes down his statements; in 1955 he twice met the claimant and in 1956 he threatened him and the entire Carlist executive with execution or incarceration in case they do not retract what looked like monarchical declarations. Despite these threats Don Javier and the new Carlist political leader Valiente still deemed Iturmendi tractable and their best liaison with Franco; they preferred to comply. As late as in 1957 Valiente thought of Iturmendi when sketching a planned Carlist collaborationist strategy with the intention to promote the Borbón-Parmas.

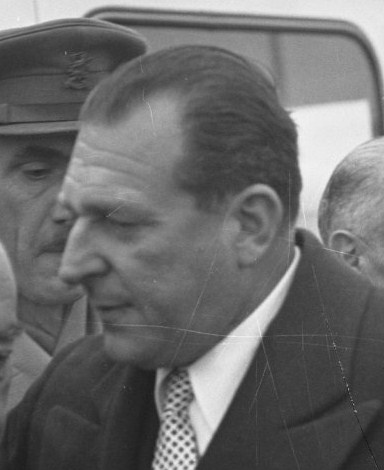
Don Juan

Many scholars suggest that in the late 1950s Iturmendi was already firmly in the Juanista camp and that his talks with the Javieristas were merely intended to make them accept Don Juan as the Carlist heir. Though he did not sign a so-called Acto de Estoril, a 1957 document in which some 50 Traditionalists declared Count of Barcelona as their dynastical leader, Iturmendi is considered a key person in behind-the-stage maneuvers and one of key Juanistas in the government; some authors claim that at the time Iturmendi already started rather to steer towards the son of Don Juan. Historians speculate that at unspecified time in the late 1950s Iturmendi joined "Operación Salmón", a long-term informal monarchist campaign to impress upon Franco the idea of crowning Don Juan Carlos. The campaign lasted for some 10 years and during the crucial period of 1962-1964 it was co-ordinated by sort of a general staff, composed of 3 ministerial heavyweights: Manuel Fraga (Information), Camilo Alonso Vega (Interior) and Iturmendi (Justice). At that time much effort was dedicated to thwarting royal ambitions of Don Javier and especially his son Don Carlos Hugo, who gained some genuine popularity. As minister of justice Iturmendi was crucial in countering efforts to obtain Spanish citizenship either for the prince or for his father; he also worked to restrict the Carlohuguista campaign in the media. In return he gained virulent hostility of the Carlos Hugo supporters, who denounced him as traitor to the Carlist cause. They also tried to insult him in public; one such incident during the 1964 Corpus Christi celebrations in Toledo triggered repression against the assailants.

== Hierarch ==
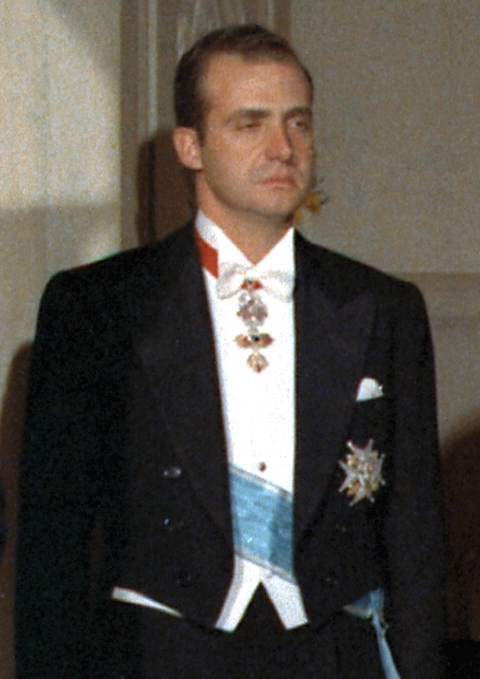
Juan Carlos, Prince of Spain

Since 1949 Iturmendi was continuously member in the Cortes by virtue of his seat in the Falangist Consejo Nacional. His parliamentary ticket was renewed in 1952, 1955, 1958, 1961 and 1964; since 1952 he held double eligibility because of his ministerial job. In 1965 he ceased as minister of justice to enable his taking seat of the Cortes speaker. The role was held by Esteban Bilbao until he resigned due to his age; as the most senior collaborative Traditionalist and the disciple of Bilbao Iturmendi inherited the job. The speaker role automatically made him president of Consejo del Reino and Consejo de Regencia, peculiar diarchic structures giving credibility to quasi-monarchic nature of the Francoist Spain. In this triple role Iturmendi enjoyed the most prestigious and distinguished positions available to civilians within the regime, even though there was very little if any political power formally attached to any of them.

It is not entirely clear what was Iturmendi's position in terms of practical politics, except that he remained utterly loyal to Franco. Some scholars counted him among key Juanista or Juancarlista supporters already since the late 1950s. Others note that faced with two overlapping sets of rivalries within the government - technocratic monarchists versus regentialists and immovilistas versus reformists - Iturmendi preferred not to take a firm stand and fluctuated. It is clear that he kept opposing the syndicalist hardliners; during 1967 works on Ley de Representacion Familiar he blocked the Falangists from entering the draft committee and ultimately ensured liberalization of the electoral law. He also remained on ice-cold terms with Carlohuguista supporters; when two of their MPs faced legal action related to so-called Cortes Transhumantes activity Iturmendi refused any assistance. His monarchist efforts were finally crowned in 1969, when Don Juan Carlos was nominated the future king of Spain; Iturmendi played a personal role in the ceremony since it was in front of him as president of the Cortes that the royal hopeful swore fidelity to the Francoist leyes fundamentales.

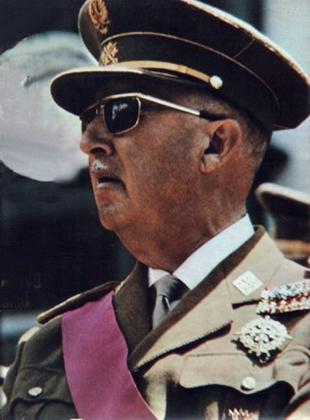
Franco

In late 1969 Iturmendi resigned as president of the Cortes, Consejo del Reino and Consejo de Regencia; he quoted his age and declared withdrawal from active politics. This did not prevent his 8th consecutive appointment to the Cortes in 1971, since not having resigned his seat in the National Council of the Movimiento he still automatically qualified as procurador. His last term lasted unexpectedly long as the parliament was not dissolved until his death; similarly he also retained membership in Consejo Nacional. Already a septuagenarian, he usually remained politically passive. However, in the early 1970s he was noted for joining forces with Traditionalist Carlists in an attempt to build Hermandad de Maestrazgo, an organization supposed to counter the progressive Carlohuguista bid to control Carlism. Following the death of Franco Iturmendi was counted among "40 de Ayete", direct Franco appointees to the council and to the Cortes still serving; others name him "pata negra franquista".

== Reception and legacy ==
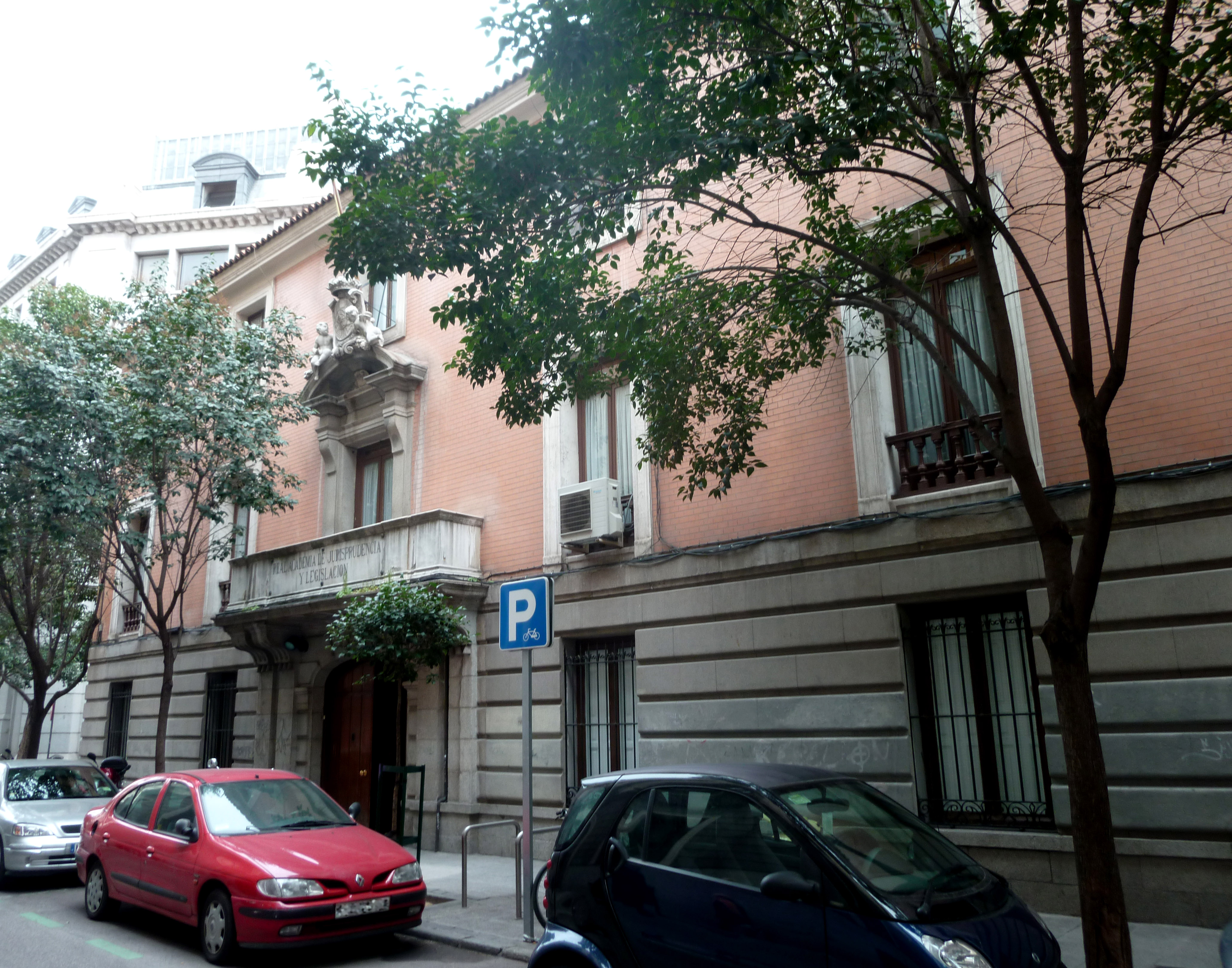
Academia de Jurisprudencia site

During the Francoist era Iturmendi was hailed in the media as a great statesman. He was decorated with a number of honors, above all Cross of Isabel la Católica, Order of Carlos III, Order of San Raimundo de Peñafort and Mérito Civil. In 1955 he was declared hijo predilecto by Baracaldo. Among many prestigious bodies he formed part of the first to be mentioned is Real Academia de Jurisprudencia y Legislación, which he joined in 1973. His numerous works were published between 1940 and 1973; they are either juridical studies or dissertations on history of Traditionalist thought. His death was acknowledged in nationwide media; most presented him as great jurist and politician. In 1977 Juan Carlos de Borbón conferred upon Iturmendi's widow the title of condesa de Iturmendi. The move was to honor the deceased as "constante defensor de la Institución Monárquica" and turned out to be one of only 6 condados created during his rule; the title is currently held by Iturmendi's grandson, Antonio Iturmendi Mac-Lellan. At least in one street has been named after him.

Over time perception of Iturmendi and his role in history changed dramatically. Though already in the 1950s he was dubbed "a scoundrel" by some orthodox Carlists and declared "a traitor" by Carlohuguista politicians and Carlohuguista historiography in the 1970s, only in the late 20th century in the Spanish public discourse his dominant image became this of a villain, member of the dictatorial authoritarian elite associated with repression. The anti-Francoist backlash of the 21st century changed street names; left-wing deputies demand that his portrait gets removed from the gallery of Cortes speakers and his official biography on the Cortes website was long in the status of "being reworked". Family relation with Iturmendi was used in campaign against his nephew, José Iturmendi Morales, when he ran for the Universidad Complutense rectorship in 2011. In some partisan works he is dubbed "canalla". There are authors who deny him the name of a Traditionalist or a Carlist.

In scientific historiographic discourse Iturmendi has not earned a monograph so far, be it a full-blown biography or a minor article. In general works dealing with Francoism he is usually acknowledged as a noticeable, but second-rate figure, a man who held two important jobs but who did not qualify among key policy-makers of the regime. Some scholars suggest that the likes of Rodezno, Bilbao and Iturmendi were instrumental in shaping Francoism as they infused Traditionalist spirit into the corporative organicist concepts of the early regime, some rather underline his role in relation to the Alfonsist restoration and the ultimate crowning of Don Juan Carlos, and some tend to present him as an opportunist who did not let "Carlism get in the way" of his career. Some mention him on the list of Basques on prominent positions within Francoism. At times he is noted as the one who delegalized prostitution in Spain, though some scholars present it as a reactionary rather than a progressive move.

== See also ==
- Carlism
- Traditionalism (Spain)
- Carlo-francoism
- Francoism
