= Ministry of Trade (Spain) =

Government ministry in Spain

- Ministerio de Comercio

Agency overview
- Formed: 20 July 1951 (first iteration); 14 July 1993 (second iteration)
- Preceding agencies: Ministry of Industry and Trade (first iteration); Ministry of Industry, Trade and Tourism (second iteration)
- Dissolved: 7 October 1980 (first iteration); 6 May 1996 (second iteration)
- Superseding agency: Ministry of Economy and Trade (first iteration) Ministry of Economy and Finance (second iteration)
- Type: Ministry
- Jurisdiction: Government of Spain

The Ministry of Trade was the department of the Government of Spain responsible for the proposal and execution of the government policy on trade, supply and currency. The department was initially constituted as a split from the Ministry of Industry and Trade in July 1951, and was enlarged in July 1977 by assuming all competences on tourism from the disestablished Ministry of Information and Tourism. It lasted until October 1980, when it was merged into the Ministry of Economy and Trade.

The department was reformed in July 1993 under Felipe González, lasting until May 1996 when its competences were transferred to the Ministry of Economy and Finance.
