= Italian economic battles =

Fascist Italian economic policies

The Italian economic battles were a series of economic policies undertaken by the National Fascist Party in Italy during the 1920s and 1930s. They were designed to increase the potential of Italy becoming a great power by reclaiming land, placing emphasis on home-grown produce and having a strong currency.

== The battles ==
- Battle for Grain – started in 1925; aimed to increase bread and cereal production in Italy to reduce the necessity for imports. It became the equivalent of the Green Revolution, with 5000 new farms being built for the extra production.
- Battle for the Lira – 1926; aimed to reduce inflation and fix the Lira at 90 to £, proving the power of the Lira and Italy
- Battle for Land – aimed to clear marshland and make it suitable for farming, as well as reclaiming land and reducing health risks
- Battle for Births – focus upon creating a larger population by encouraging women to have more children, with special incentives for those having five or more

== See also ==
- Economy of Italy under Fascism
