= Vidoni =

Vidoni may refer to:

== People ==
- Massimo Vidoni, Italian entrepreneur
- Pietro Vidoni (1610–1681), Italian cardinal

== Other uses ==
- Palazzo Vidoni-Caffarelli, palace in Rome
- Pact of the Vidoni Palace, building in Pennsylvania
