= Battle for Births =

Economic policy of Fascist Italy

The Battle for Births was one of four economic battles that took place in Fascist Italy (1922–1943), the others being the Battle for Grain (to make the country more self-sufficient), the Battle for the Lira (an increase in the value of the currency), and the Battle for Land (which involved policies of land reclamation). Prime Minister Benito Mussolini, often known as Il Duce, envisioned an Italian Empire to rival that of the Romans, and in order to carry out this objective, foresaw the need to increase the population. Mussolini pursued an often aggressive foreign policy to achieve his colonial aims: the Italian army invaded Abyssinia (now Ethiopia) in October 1935. The phrase "Battle for Births" was also used, in contemporary sources, to describe policies developed in Nazi Germany.

== Implementation ==
Mussolini feuded with the Catholic Church over a number of issues in his time in office, but their views, at that time, coincided on the issue of gender roles and contraception: both felt that women should assume a role as wife and mother, and both disagreed with contraception and abortion, with Mussolini banning the former. The Battle for Births began in 1927: Mussolini introduced a number of measures to encourage reproduction, with an objective of increasing the population from 40 million to 60 million by 1950. Loans were offered to married couples, with part of the loan cancelled for each new child, and any married man who had more than six children was made exempt from taxation. Mussolini, who had developed a cult of personality, argued that the Italian people had a duty to himself to produce as many children as possible.

In correspondence with these incentives, laws were brought in to penalize any citizens who proved to be less productive. Bachelors were taxed increasingly, and by the late 1930s, the civil service began recruiting and promoting only those who were fertile and married. The state exercised some control over the number of women in employment through nationalized businesses, and the state-owned railway company sacked all women employed since 1915, with the exception of war widows. These policies extended to private industry as well, with the majority of companies reserving promotions for married men.

== Outcome ==
Unlike the Battle for Grain and Battle for Land, which were considered to be moderately successful, the Battle for Births is seen as a failure. By 1950—seven years after Mussolini had been ousted by King Victor Emmanuel III, and five years since his execution—Italy's population stood at 47.5 million. Marriage rates stayed virtually the same during Mussolini's reign, and birth rates decreased until 1936, after which there was a modest increase. The birth rate of 112 per 1000 in 1936 was below that of pre-World War I levels (1911: 147 per 1000). Mussolini felt that the lack of enthusiasm shown by the Italian nation had cost him 15 army divisions in World War II (in which Italy had fought alongside the Axis Powers).
