= Battle of the Marshes (disambiguation) =

Battle of the Marshes can refer to:

- Battle of the Marshes, an alternative name for the Battle of Fahl in 634 or 635
- Battle of the Marshes, a battle during the Iran–Iraq War
- Battle of the Marshes (Italy), the draining of the Pontine Marshes by the Fascists in Italy, also known as "Battle for Land"
