= Agricultural policy of Fascist Italy =

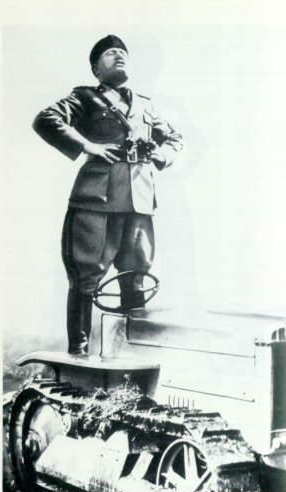
Benito Mussolini propaganda photo for the Battle for Grain

The Agricultural policy of fascism in Italy was a series of complex measures and laws designed and enforced during Italian Fascism, as a move towards attempted autarky, specifically by Benito Mussolini following the Battle for Grain and the 1935 invasion of Abyssinia and subsequent trade embargoes (despite continued trade with Germany).

== Introduction ==
During the Giolittian Era farmers were gathered into two distinct groups in Italy:

- The SAI (Italian Society of Farmers), founded in Rome in 1895, was engaged in lobbying activities and as a pressure group of farmers.
- The CNA (National Confederation of Agriculture), founded in 1910 in Bologna, which was in charge of trade unionism in agriculture.

To counter this situation, the government of Francesco Saverio Nitti issued the Visocchi-decree in 1919, followed by the Falcioni-decree in 1920, which allowed the granting of ill-cultivated and uncultivated land to cooperatives formed by war veterans. For the first time, the State gave landless peasants the necessary legal instruments to claim the right to land, despite the ambiguities and red tape.

Upon the return from the First World War, veterans returned to a promise for Latifundium, ill-cultivated land and uncultivated land to be distributed amongst them and cooperatives formed by veterans, under the Visocchi-decree in 1919 and the Falcioni-decree in 1920 under the government of Francesco Saverio Nitti. In this period there were many clashes known as the Red Biennium, in which many Italians rioted and picketed against high prices and inflation, known in Tuscany as Bocci Bocci. (A linguistic contamination of the word Bolshevism) This led to an expansion of a peasant movement with extensive and comprehensive land occupations due to a socialist hatred of veterans for the outcome of the war, who were often insulted in the street, some of whom came under attack, for instance, the Italian military officer Piero Operti who was among the residents attacked by militant socialists.

During this period two unions were created during the clashes of the Red Biennium period, known as white and red alloys, the protagonists of the clashes. Large landowners sustained a campaign of Sbracciantizzazione, selecting farmers based on personal skills, and was aimed at reducing the number of workers per day (causing a reduction of 44% to 28% of rural workers who were not landowners), failed largely due to the small assignments of land.

== The agricultural policy of Fascism ==
A fundamental principle of the Fascist agrarian policy was to apply the principles of partnership, encouraging the different social classes to work together, as opposed to the system of continuous confrontation inherent in the visions of Marxism and Capitalism.

In addition to his ideological leadership, Mussolini pursued a dictatorship of the proletariat, but favouring the peasants. The Duce aimed to create a new social class in Italy by the expropriation of large estates and the transformation of tenants into landowners and settlers.

=== Measures ===
With the seizure of power by the Fascists, a new agricultural policy was undertaken, based upon concepts of independence and sovereignty of national markets, as well as fascist policies pursued in each sector towards foreign markets. Italy during this period was importing large quantities of grain, equal to one-third of the national demand.

With Fascist aims of autarky, three main methods of intervention were pursued:

- The sbracciantizzazione.
- The reclamation and expropriation of large estates.
- The Battle for Grain.

==== The Sbracciantizzazione ====
The Sbracciantizzazione was a policy pursued by the fascists with the aim of reducing or eliminating the "work day", and reducing the number of workers per day in favor of sharecroppers, tenants, and settlers, to develop small and medium properties, in favor of the development of employment contracts and encouragement of small holdings for the farmers and labourers.

==== Reclamation and expropriation ====
1924 anti-malaria poster

The basic law for land reclamation was the Lex Serpieri n. 3256 of May 8, 1924, aimed at land reclamation work in the Pontine Marshes, with the establishment of the Land Reclamation Piscinara and reclamation consortiums (managed and funded by the state) which started channeling the waters of the river basin Astura, reclamation of swamp land, for the management of forestry and pastoral heritage.

In 1926 a royal decree was launched that established two consortia: the existing Piscinara Consortium, which was extended to encompass 48,762 hectares, and the Consortium of Reclamation of the Pontine region, 26,567 hectares, a relatively lower-lying area, sites formed from the territories under sea level and consisted mostly of marshland, thus remediation of reclamation was more complex. Because Mussolini was unable to act alone and did not want to alienate the propertied classes, land reclamation relied heavily on state subsidies.

By the end of the twenties, however, the situation changed and the control of the Consortium by the landowners was overcome thanks to the "Mussolini law" (elaborated by Arrigo Serpieri) of 1928, with which all the land that was unproductive or abandoned was expropriated by about two thirds, allowing for the passage of most reclaimed land to come under direct control of the State, which delegated it to the charity, Opera National Combatants and war Veterans (ONC) together with the management of all projects and land reclamation.

Between 1938 and 1942, the second phase of reclamation was introduced with places of interest being the Puglia and Campania, regions underwent rehabilitation work and continued during World War II, overall over a total of one million hectares of land was reclaimed by the fascist state.

In parallel with the reclamation, fascism carried out the expropriation of large land owners, and owners of thousands of acres of land largely left uncultivated and unproductive, these areas were sown with wheat or left alone to pasture resulting in revenues. The operations of expropriation brought good results in central Italy in Apulia, and less successfully towards Sicily, where the operations of the enormous extent of expropriation of large estates (500,000 hectares), occurred too close to the war to be successfully brought to completion.

==== The Battle for Grain ====
The Battle for Grain was instead a campaign (proclaimed on 20 June 1925) of autarky nationalist self-sufficiency in wheat production. It led to the establishment of the Standing Committee of the Grain, and in agreement with Mussolini, decided that the interventions of the state on agricultural production should cater mainly to the increase in the average yield of wheat per hectare, as a modest increase in the average would yield considerable results nationally.

Accordingly, the Standing Committee of the Grain had to face three major problems: Seed selection, fertilizers, and the problems of technical improvements/pricing. With a series of legal measures aimed at modernizing farming techniques (natural and chemical fertilizers, mechanization of agriculture, etc.), the protection of domestic labour from outside competition and the development of state structures (such as itinerant agricultural professorships and agricultural consortia), excellent results were obtained.

== Results ==
In 1931, six years after the first measures of the new national agricultural policy (the launch of the Battle of the Grain), Italy eliminated its trade deficit of 5 billion pounds and almost fully satisfy its need for wheat. It reached a production of 81 million tons, but it was still necessary to import a small quantity of wheat, possibly due to the population increase that occurred over that period.

Records for the year 1931 show the production of wheat per hectare following the agricultural policy reforms. In 1931, Italy produced 16.1 quintals per hectare, which after conversion is 1.77 tons per hectare. By comparison, the United States was producing 8.9 tons of wheat per hectare at that time.

According to a 2020 study, the increase in wheat productivity due to the battle for grain had unintended effects on industrialization and growth, which persisted over the long term.

== See also ==
- Nazareno Strampelli
- Battle for Grain
- Labour Charter of 1927
