= Bocci-Bocci =

The term Bocci-bocci is an Italian linguistic corruption of the word Bolshevism, meaning to "Break everything", used particularly in Florence and Tuscany during the Biennio Rosso, in which there was a number of mass strikes against high costs of living, self-management experiments towards autarky through land and factory occupation, and in Turin and Milan, workers councils were formed with factory occupation under the leadership of anarcho-syndicalists.

== See also ==
- Biennio Rosso
- Sbracciantizzazione
- Agricultural policy of Fascist Italy
