= Quota 90 =

1926 revaluation of the Italian lira

The Quota 90 (Italian: Quota novanta) was a controversial revaluation of the lira undertaken by Italian fascist dictator Benito Mussolini, announced on August 18, 1926, at a speech in Pesaro, pegging the exchange rate to Lit. 92.46 to £1 stg (19 lire against the US dollar) by December 1927, which had been the prevailing market rate when Mussolini took power in 1922.

The Quota has been described as the "most controversial measure undertaken by [Mussolini's] government before 1929", despite the general consensus that some revaluation was necessary among Italian bankers and industrialists. Minister of Finance Giuseppe Volpi—who preferred a rate of 120, or 125, against the pound—considered the quota a drastic overvaluation. Many historians regard the Quota as motivated by Mussolini's desire to "exert his will" rather than economic rationality, as a "political decision", or as a "proof of force" against industrialists. In response to requests from Volpi and industrialists to reconsider the Quota, Mussolini threatened even lower rates.

An August 8, 1926, letter from Mussolini to Volpi claimed that "the fate of the regime is tied to the lira". The revaluation led to a massive increase in mergers in 1928 and 1929, beginning a process of industrial consolidation which culminated in 1932 with .88% of corporations (144) controlling 51.7% of corporate capital. The Quota was accompanied by industrial and agricultural wage reductions in 1927, which overcompensated for the reduction in prices, decreasing the real wage and thus the purchasing power of most Italians; unemployment also rose, especially in the agricultural South.

== See also ==
- Battle for the Lira
- Economy of Fascist Italy
