= Battle for the Lira =

1920s Italian fascist economic policy

The Battle for the Lira was an economic policy undertaken by the Fascists in Italy during the 1920s as an attempt to raise the claims of Italy becoming a great power.

== Background ==
When Benito Mussolini took over as Prime Minister of Italy in 1922 the economy was in a bad state following World War I. Between 1922 and 1925, the financial and economic situation generally improved dramatically and this helped to increase the power of Italy, who strived to be one of the world's leading countries.

Italy wanted to restore some of its purchasing power. But in order for this to happen it was vital that they strengthen the lira. Mussolini took the view that a weak lira would look bad for the country when presenting Italy as a great power across Europe and the United States.

== Details ==
=== Aims ===
The policy had a number of aims. These comprised:

- to fix the lira at a rate of Lit. 92.46 ("Quota 90") to sterling (£ stg)
- to reduce inflation
- to confirm the image of Fascism bringing stability
- to show the world that Italy could be a great force, with a strong, desirable currency

In October 1922 (when Mussolini first became prime minister), Lit. 90 to £1 stg had been the prevailing rate but it had declined sharply, even reaching Lit. 150 to £1 stg in 1926.

=== Actions ===
The policy was confirmed at the Pesaro Speech on 18 August 1926 and was given the name Quota 90, referring to the value they wanted to achieve.

== Results ==
The revaluation hit Italy's export trade, but, by making imports cheaper, benefited heavy industries, such as steel and chemicals, which relied on imported raw materials. These industries later provided the basis for an expanded rearmament industry and so supported the 'active' foreign policy, which became the chief characteristic of the fascist state. Tariffs on undesirable imports such as consumer goods and foodstuffs kept their high price and restricted demand, protecting Mussolini's Battle for Grain policy. However, Italian workers were pressured into accepting wage cuts to match the new value of the lira to the point where wages fell more than food prices and living standards for working-class Italians rapidly declined.

== See also ==
- Battle for Land
- Battle for Grain
- Battle for Births
- Economy of Fascist Italy
- Quota 90
