= Sbracciantizzazione =

Sbracciantizzazione was a policy pursued by Fascist Italy during the Battle for Grain.

It was aimed at reducing the number of workers per day in favor of sharecropping, tenants, and settlers to develop small and medium properties of agricultural land, as well as the elimination of rural wage work to encourage cooperative societies, agricultural credit, and land reclamation.

The policy of Sbracciantizzazione came about during the Battle for Grain and greatly contributed to an increase in social land ownership with the policy of giving land to peasants and veterans of World War I. In the countryside of northern Italy, land reclamation intensified the disintegration of socialist co-operatives.

Amongst the concrete results achieved by this policy, there was a drastic reduction from 44% to 28% in the share of landless rural workers, and with technological modernization, the increase in the index of production rose.

== See also ==
- Agricultural policy of Fascist Italy
