= Arrigo Serpieri =

Italian economist, politician and agronomist

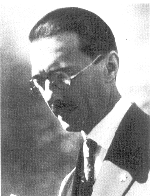
- Born: June 15, 1877; Bologna
- Died: January 29, 1960 (aged 82); Florence
- Occupation: Lecturer
- Known for: Senators of the Thirtieth Legislature of the Kingdom of Italy, economist, politician and agronomist

Arrigo Serpieri (Bologna, 15 June 1877 - Florence, 29 January 1960) was an Italian economist, politician, and agronomist. Serpieri was an expert in agricultural economics, and was undersecretary of the Ministry of Agriculture during the Fascist period.

He was also President of the Academy of Georgofili, served as rector of the University of Florence from 1937 to 1942, and was appointed Senator in 1939,

== Life ==
Born in Bologna on 15 June 1877, he led his classical studies and attended the School of Agriculture of Milan where he graduated in 1900 with a dissertation on sharecropping. Since his youth, Serpieri had attended the company of his uncle to S. Giorgio di Piano, which was considered advanced for its time. Initially he entered the Milanese school as a teacher of valuation, but in 1906 he moved to Perugia after winning the competition by a professor at the School of Agriculture of Perugia.

He taught here for one year, returning to Milan the following year when he obtained the chair holder in his school of origin. In 1922 under the Ministry of Agriculture he began his collaboration with institutions, writing and directing the Forest Act, the following year under the Ministry of Nitti in the newborn National Forestry Institute of Florence. There he resumed teaching economics and valuation. Serpieri pushed to separate the study of forestry issues by studying the problems of mountain areas.

In the First World War he served in the Army Corps of Engineers, as a lieutenant, but was soon assigned to the management of forest services and procurement, where he earned the title of captain.

He died on 29 January 1960.

== The Fascist Era ==
From 1919 to 1935 Serpieri was awarded the President's Secretariat for the Mountain. In 1923 he became Secretary of State for Agriculture, where he remained for about a year. On liberal ideas, he maintained positions far from those of the vertices of fascists, although engaged in the Battle for grain, in order to increase the production. Serpieri would have preferred a liberal position if it where not for companies choosing production of wheat under a higher gain rather than at the desire of Benito Mussolini.

Politically he belonged the National Fascist Party, and was close to the position of Socialist Filippo Turati. He was a supporter of small land ownership, competitiveness, and believed that the future would not be in the estate but in independent firms: Mussolini ignored the objections of Serpieri and proceeded with the methods he deemed best, leading, especially in the south, an explosion of landlordism and tenant farming, against the wishes of Serpieri.

He was a member of the Chamber of Deputies from 24 May 1924 to 21 January 1929.

Serpieri had the merit of beginning the process of distinguishing between business economics and agricultural engineering, up to the time treated in parallel texts on agriculture in similar ways. He was to all intents and purposes a founder the agricultural economy, and was a leading proponent of the reclamation work accomplished during the twenties. He was also considered the father of the concept of land reclamation in Italy, and charged the organizing committee of the 1st National Exhibition of Reclamation that the regime organized in celebration of the tenth anniversary of the March on Rome.

Amongst the works which show the footprints of Serpieri there is the Luzzatti Law of 2 June 1910, which favored forestry freeing it from mere intervention of hydrogeological redevelopment. His contribution to Law 337 of 30 December 1923, further corrected the Forest Law, and remained until the current revision implemented in 1952, which transferred the jurisdiction of the state forest to the regions.

Serpiere pushed the state to intervene in the financing of credit for agriculture, so as to encourage investment and the contraction of loans for business development. He tried to fight the big estates by Decree 753 of 18 May 1924, threatening to expropriate the landlords who have not turned their farms into modern companies. He reformed the organization of the Agricultural Schools, transferring skills to the Ministry of Economy (formerly divided between Economy, Education and Agriculture) and also creating agricultural technical institutes for the training of personnel with intermediate qualifications.

From 1929 to 1935 whilst Under-Secretary in the Ministry of Agriculture, he launched the Consolidated Law on land reclamation (Law no. 215, Feb 13, 1933), which defined the type of state intervention in land reclamation and pushed in favour of remedial measures to mountain areas, as well as establishing various forms of financing, including grans, and defined as an integrated plan of construction work and services, required for the development of the country. The law was going to affect the interests of many wealthy landowners, influential in politics, which led to the marginalization of Serpieri within the hierarchies of government.

In 1939 he was appointed Senator of the United XXX Legislature. After the war he played a political role in the secondary. He continued his studies and teaching since 1947.

== Works ==
- Study on vineyards in the lower Bolognese, 1901 .
- The contract farming and the conditions of the farmers in the high Milanese; 1910 .
- The proposed modifications to the Forest Act, 1911 .
- The war and the crisis of timber in Italy, with G. Rye, 1916 .
- The raw wood, with G. Rye, 1917 .
- Survey program in economic and agrarian, with V. Peglion, 1918 .
- The method of estimation of real property; 1917
- For the supply of timber in the postwar period, 1919 .
- The mountains, forests, grasslands, 1920 .
- Studies on agricultural contracts; 1920 .
- The agitation of the farmers in northern and central Europe and the reform of agrarian contracts; 1920 .
- For illustration of an organic Italian mountains - Experiments of forestry statistics, 1921 .
- The agricultural policy of the national government; 1924 .
- The agricultural policy in Italy and the recent legislation; 1925 .
- Help in research of Agricultural Economics, 1929 .
- Problems of land corporate economy; 1929 .
- The reclamation; 1930 .

The war and the Italian rural classes; 1930. Between politics and the rural economy; 1934. Land reclamation; 1937. Land reform in Italy, 1946. Legislation on land reclamation; 1948. Agricultural cooperatives for the occupancy of the land in Italy, with U. Sorbi, 1955. Principles of Agricultural Economics 1956.
