= Massimo Vidoni =

Italian entrepreneur based in Dubai

- Other names: The Truffleman
- Website: https://trufflemandubai.com/

Massimo Vidoni, also known as The Truffleman, is an Italian entrepreneur based out of the United Arab Emirates who supplies truffles and other gourmet ingredients to prominent restaurants, venues and private buyers the Middle East. Vidoni has been featured on BBC's documentary series "Inside Dubai: Playground of the Rich" and has been covered in various local and international publications, including Bloomberg, BBC Good Food, and Forbes magazine.

== Early life and career ==
Born in 1968 in the Friuli-Venezia Giulia region of Northeast Italy, Vidoni entered the truffle industry during the 1990s in New York City. He co-owned and operated Terramare, a café acclaimed for its Northern Italian specialties, prominently featuring truffles.

Vidoni also served as an independent sales agent, distributing truffles to culinary figures like Thomas Keller, Charlie Trotter, and Daniel Boulud. This solidified his reputation as a trusted supplier in the United States. Notably, Vidoni's early career included the 1997 sale of a 1kg White Truffle, a rarity in the truffle world, which earned the moniker "heavyweight champion" and was sold to Rick Moonen at the famous James Beard House.

=== Founding Italtouch ===
In 2011, Vidoni moved to Dubai, recognizing untapped potential in the local culinary landscape and in 2012 he established his brand, Italtouch. Leveraging his expertise, Vidoni positioned Italtouch as a prominent supplier of truffles, gourmet food, caviar, and specialty products.

A significant milestone for Italtouch occurred in November 2018, when Vidoni orchestrated the sale of a 1.006kg Tuber Magnatum Pico truffle to Roberto's in the Dubai International Financial Centre (DIFC). This transaction set a record as the most expensive truffle ever sold in the UAE, with an approximate value of AED187,000 (USD 51,000).

=== Digital expansion ===
During the COVID-19 pandemic, Vidoni adapted by using technology to address changing consumer needs. He introduced trufflemandubai.com, an online platform tailored to private consumers seeking premium culinary ingredients. Additionally, in 2020, he launched a home delivery service, expanding the accessibility of gourmet products.
