= Chemical industry in Italy =

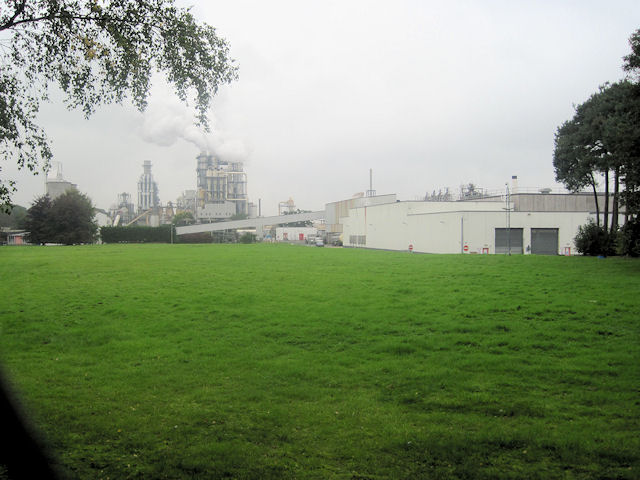
Chemical industry at Chirk

The chemical industry in Italy is a sector of businesses involved in the production and distribution of chemicals, both for industrial and consumer use. This industry has been integral to Italy's economic development and modernization.

== History ==
Italy's association with the chemical processes dates back to its ancient roots. The Romans, for instance, were known for their proficiency in various chemical processes, such as the production of dyes, glass, and certain metals.

However, the origins of a structured chemical industry in Italy can be pinpointed to the late 19th century. As the European continent experienced an Industrial Revolution, Italy too embarked on its path of industrialization, leading to a surge in the need for chemicals in various sectors like textiles, automotive, and construction. The 20th century saw significant growth with the rise of numerous chemical companies, capitalizing on Italy's strategic location in Europe, its access to the Mediterranean, and its growing domestic market.

The World Wars greatly influenced the trajectory of the chemical industry. During World War I, there was a surge in the demand for chemicals for explosives, medicines, and other wartime essentials. Following World War II, the Marshall Plan provided a boost to Italy's reconstruction efforts, and the chemical industry played a pivotal role in rebuilding the country's infrastructure and economy.

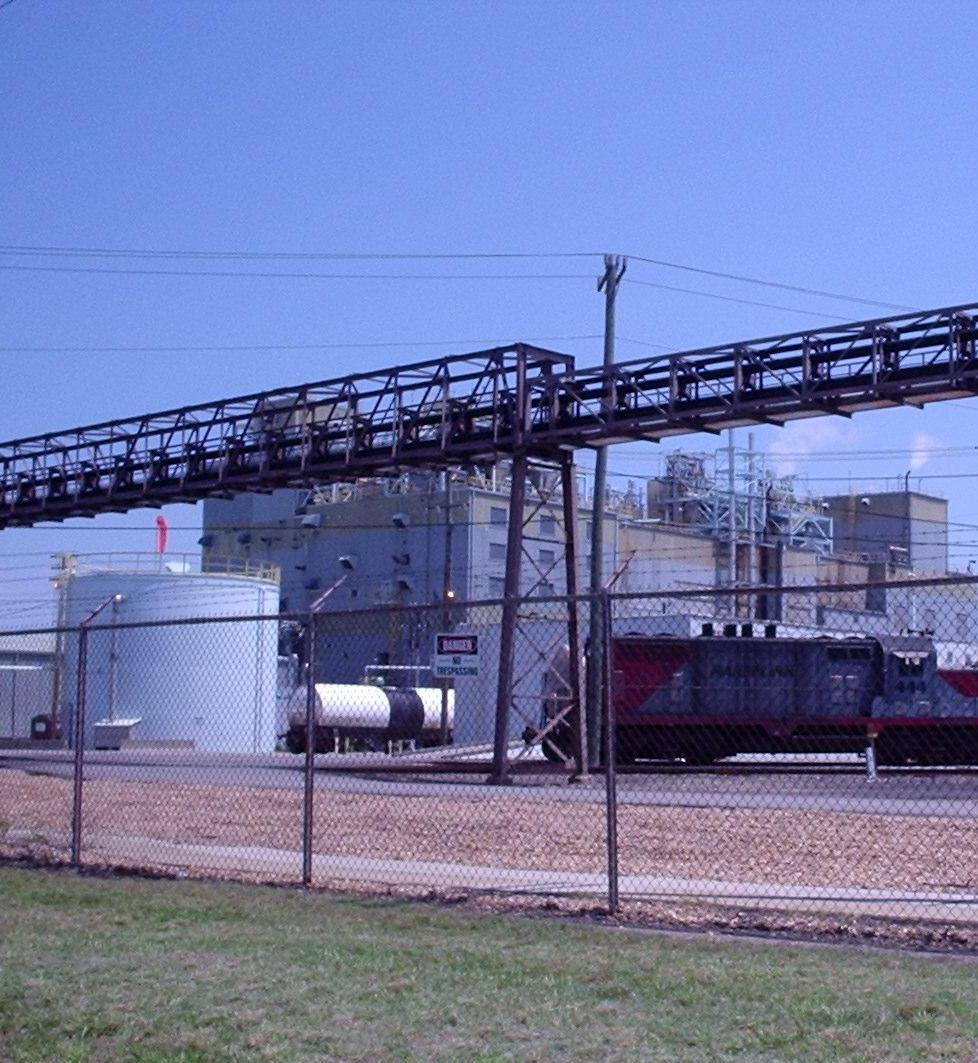

The latter half of the 20th century saw a shift towards more specialized and high-value chemicals, with a decline in the production of basic chemicals. This period also marked the rise of the pharmaceutical sector within the chemical industry, making Italy one of the prominent players in the European pharmaceutical market.

== Key sectors ==
=== Petrochemicals ===
Italy has a mature petrochemical sector, producing a variety of products such as plastics, synthetic rubber, and organic chemicals.

=== Pharmaceuticals ===
The pharmaceutical sector in Italy is one of the country's most research-intensive industries, with strong global connections and a history of significant contributions.

=== Agrochemicals ===
With a strong agricultural base, the production of fertilizers, pesticides, and other agrochemicals is another major sector.

=== Specialty chemicals ===
Italy has a niche in producing specialty chemicals used in cosmetics, food processing, and other industries.

== See also ==
- Chemical industry
- List of largest chemical producers
