= Rafael Cavestany =

Spanish politician (1902–1958)

Minister of Agriculture of Spain
- In office 19 July 1951 – 25 February 1957
- Prime Minister: Francisco Franco
- Preceded by: Carlos Rein
- Succeeded by: Cirilo Cánovas

Personal details
- Born: Rafael Cavestany y de Anduaga; 27 October 1902 Madrid, Kingdom of Spain
- Died: 17 July 1958 (aged 55) Madrid, Spanish State
- Party: FET y de las JONS

Rafael Cavestany y de Anduaga (27 October 1902 – 17 July 1958) was a Spanish politician who served as Minister of Agriculture of Spain between 1951 and 1957, during the Francoist dictatorship.
