= Labour Charter of 1927 =

Italian legislation

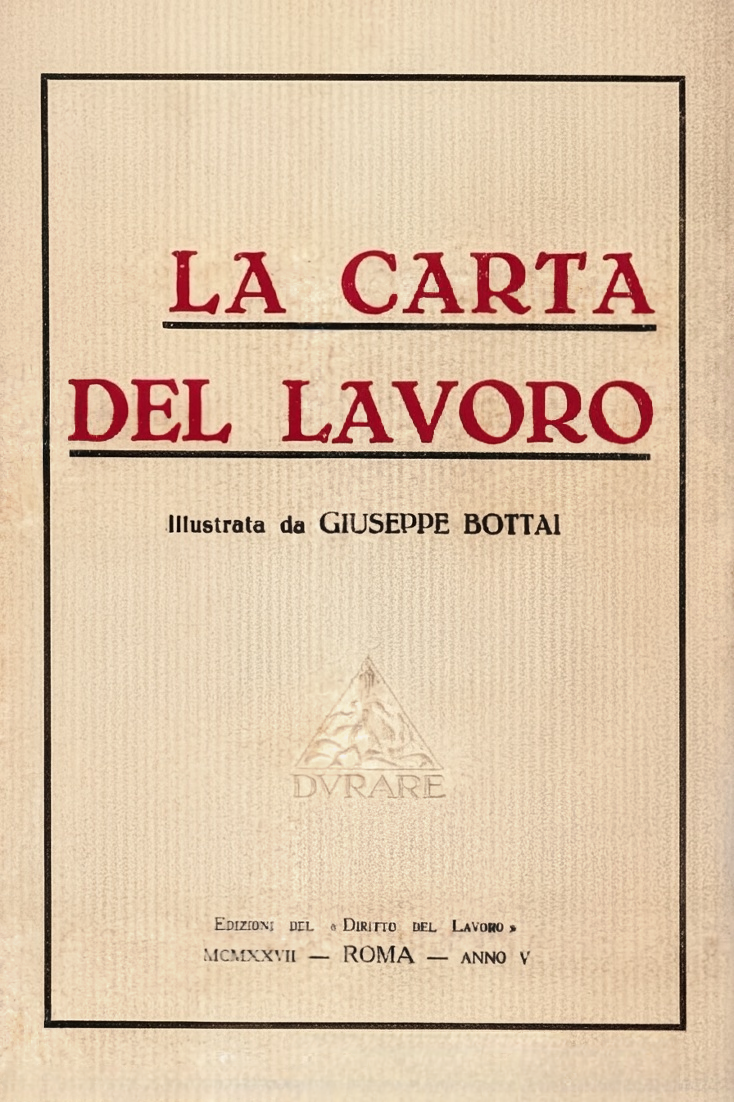
1927 edition of the Carta del Lavoro commented by Giuseppe Bottai

The Charter of Labour of 1927 (Italian: Carta del Lavoro) was one of the main pieces of legislation enacted by the Fascist Italy in the attempts to modernise the economy. The Charter was promulgated by Grand Council of Fascism and publicized in the Lavoro d'Italia newspaper on 23 April 1927. It was mainly designed by Alfredo Rocco, the Minister of Justice.

== Background ==
Benito Mussolini, the founder of fascism, called for the "direct representation of interests" already in the inaugural speech of the Fasci Italiani di Combattimento. There were two proposals on implementing a corporatist model in Fascist Italy: Giuseppe Bottai wanted to replace the Chamber of Deputies and the Senate with the corporations, while the more moderate proposals sought to transform the parliament, and more specifically the Senate, in line with the corporatist policies. In the futurist manifesto of 1918, Filippo Tommaso Marinetti supported the "transformation of parliament through the equitable participation of industrialists, farmers, engineers and businessmen in the government of the country". Alfredo Rocco wanted the integration of the organized interests of various professions and functional groups into the state through the elimination of the parliament in favour of these professional representative bodies. However, the "legal" ascent to power by fascists, the monarchy which served as an heir to the liberal era and the inter-institutional tensions complicated and limited the scope of the reform.

== Content ==
The goal of the charter was to establish a corporatist state. It had 30 articles, the first nine of which provided for the ideological framework, the institutional structure and social ethics.

Collective contracts (established by article 4) were negotiated following the issuing of the Charter of Labour, but with the effect of a decrease in wages. Collective contracts were able to ensure long term employment and large scale welfare including paid vacations and numerous other benefits workers hadn't previously enjoyed. Not until during the Great Depression did the state subsidize welfare; until then employers were made to pay for all benefits. The Charter declared private enterprise to be the most efficient mode of production.

Article 1:

"The Italian Nation is an organism having ends, life, and means of action superior to those of individuals, singly or in groups, of which it is composed. It is a moral, political, and economic unity, realized wholly in the Fascist State."

Article 2:

"Work, in all its intellectual, technical, and manual forms, is a social obligation. To this end, and only to this end, it is safeguarded by the State. The totality of production is unitary from the national point of view; its objectives are unitary and comprise the well-being of the producers and the development of national strength."

Article 3:

"There is freedom of professional or union organization. But only the union legally recognized by, and subject to, the control of the State has the right to legally represent the entire category of employers or employees by which it is constituted [...]; or to stipulate collective labor contracts binding on all those belonging to the category; or to impose on them dues, or to exercise on their behalf delegate functions of public interest."

Article 4:

"In the collective labor contract is found the concrete expression of the solidarity of the various makers of the product, by means of the conciliation of the opposing interests of the employers and the workers, and their subordination to the superior interests of production."

Article 6:

"Legally recognized professional associations insure the legal equality between employers and workers, maintain the discipline of production and work, and promotes its perfection. Corporations constitute the unitary organizations of production and integrally represent its interests [...]. Corporations are recognized legally as organs of the State [...]."

Article 7:

"The corporative State considers private initiative, in the field of production, as the most efficient and useful instrument of the Nation."

Article 9 stated that:

"State intervention in economic production may take place only where private initiative is lacking or is insufficient, or when are at stakes the political interest of the State. This intervention may take the form of control, encouragement or direct management."

Article 13:

"The duty of employment is under control of the corporate organs. Employers have the obligation to hire workers who are official members of the appropriate trades, and have the power to choose from the rolls of membership, giving precedence to the members of the party and the Fascist unions according to their seniority of membership."

== See also ==
- Economics of Italian Fascism
- Fascist socialization
- Corporatism
- Labour law
- Collective bargaining
- International Labour Organization

== Sources ==
  - Pinto, Antonio (2019). Corporatism and Fascism: The Corporatist Wave in Europe. Routledge. ISBN 9780367200398.
