= Pact of the Vidoni Palace =

On October 2, 1925, at the Palazzo Vidoni-Caffarelli in Rome, the Vidoni Pact was signed between CGII (Confederazione Generale dell'Industria Italiana) and the General Confederation of Fascist Syndical Corporations' representatives (GCFSC).

== Fascist control ==
The pact abolished Catholic, Socialist and all other independent unions and declared Fascist-controlled unions to have a monopoly on labour representation. The industrialists were hugely reluctant to sign as they feared a united labour force would pose a significant threat in the years to come, but were willing to make concessions in order to appease the National Fascist Party. The pact also prohibited workers' councils, to the dismay of Edmondo Rossoni, head of the GCFSC, who saw worker and employer integration as an essential ingredient in corporatism. Evidence suggests that the CGII had pointed out to Mussolini that worker councils were dominated by socialists and therefore had to be disbanded.

== Arbitrator ==
The state was given the authority as sole arbitrator over capital-labour negotiations, significantly increasing the power of the state. Overall, it placed Prime Minister Benito Mussolini in a far greater position of control over that of the workers within industry, and acted to effectively ban free trade unions. The pact was signed during Mussolini's fascist control of Italy and was one of many steps taken to establish his dictatorship.
