= Battle for Grain =

Fascist italian economic policy

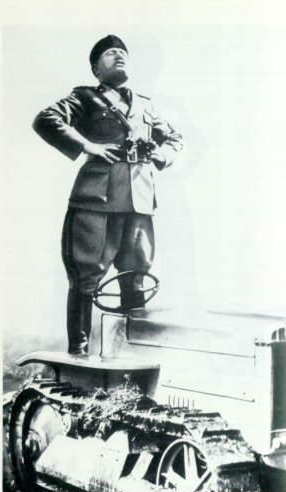
Benito Mussolini propaganda photo for the Battle for Grain

The Battle for Grain (Italian: Battaglia del grano), also known as the Battle for Wheat, was a propaganda campaign launched in 1925 during the fascist regime of Italy by Benito Mussolini, with the aim of gaining self-sufficiency in wheat production and freeing Italy from the "slavery of foreign bread". This campaign was successful in increasing wheat output and lowering the trade deficit; this happened at the expense of diversification, as many farmers who grew other produce had to clear their land for grain cultivation.

== Aims ==
Some of the policy's aims included:

- Boost grain production to make Italy self-sufficient in wheat
- Reduce the trade balance deficit
- Reduce the need of importing bread
- Project Italy as a major European power

== See also ==
- Agricultural policy of Fascist Italy
- Battle of the Lira
- Battle for Births
- Battle for Land
- Sbracciantizzazione
- Economy of Fascist Italy

== Sources ==
- Celli, Carlo. 2013. Economic Fascism: Primary Sources on Mussolini's Crony Capitalism. Axios Press.
- Fascist Italy by John Hite
- Mussolini by Denis Mack Smith
