= Battle for Land =

Fascist italian policy

The Battle for Land, started in 1928 in Italy by Benito Mussolini, aimed to clear marshland and make it suitable for farming, as well as reclaiming land and reducing health risks.

== Aims ==
The primary aims of the Battle for Land was to increase the amount of land available for cereal production, to help with the Battle for Grain. This would in turn provide more jobs and show dynamic action from the government, impressing foreign governments. Another important aim of the Battle was to improve health by reducing malaria, which was an issue due to the wildlife populating the marshlands.

== Actions ==
The government expanded the previous government's schemes of providing money to drain or irrigate farmland. Private landowners were made to cooperate with drainage schemes and other projects via the landholder association, which determined contributions. Malaria swamps were drained and a network of small farms were set up, owned by ex-servicemen, as Fascist propaganda stressed the need to revive the rural areas and to build up a strong peasantry - which would strengthen the fascist regime. The government also abolished day and short term labour. Collective contracts were negotiated which secured long-term employment in agriculture. This encouraged relocation to the countryside, particularly in the South.

== Consequences ==
Public health was improved, due to the destruction of the habitats of malaria-carrying wildlife. The Battle created thousands of jobs during the depression, and resulted in the creation of new towns for show pieces – Latina and Sabaudia – as well as reclamation of 80,000 hectares of land from the years 1928 to 1938. However, the 80,000 hectares reclaimed was only one twentieth of the propaganda claim, which was one sixth of Italy's land. Three quarters of the reclaimed land was in the North; the South, which was most in need of improvement, was largely neglected. Southern landowners who were unable to make great enough contributions in terms of finance, stock or employment had their land expropriated, albeit rarely. The Fascist regime achieved nothing in the way of land redistribution, which was, in any event, inconsistent with the central thrust of the higher-profile Battle for Grain. Due to these failures, the scheme was abandoned in 1940.
