= Second government of Francisco Franco =

1939–1945 government of Spain

2nd government of Francisco Franco
- Government of Spain
- 1939–1945
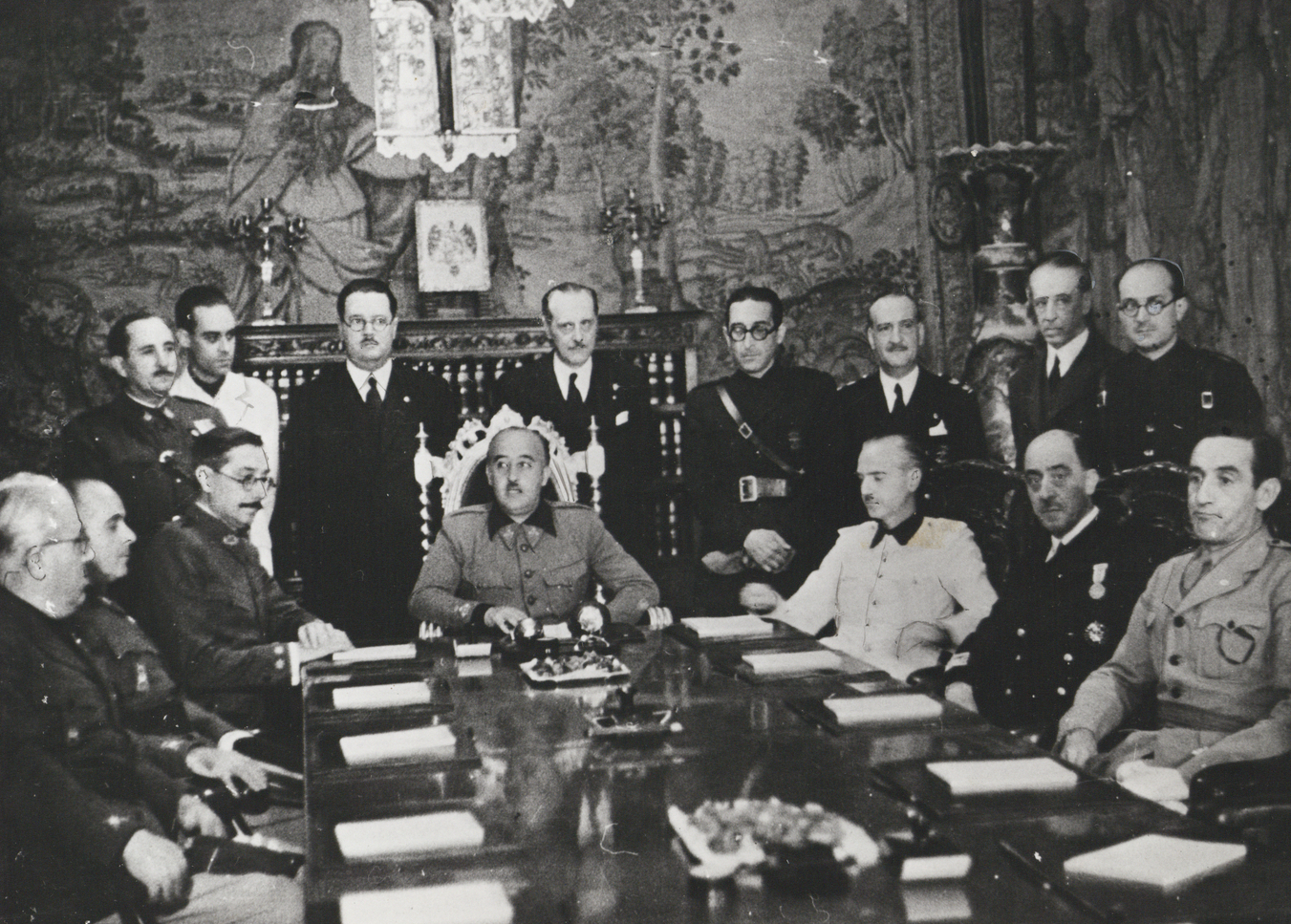
- The government in August 1939
- Date formed: 9 August 1939
- Date dissolved: 20 July 1945

People and organisations
- Head of State: Francisco Franco
- Prime Minister: Francisco Franco
- No. of ministers: 15 (Note: Does not include the prime minister.) (1939–1940); 14 (1940); 13 (1940–1945)
- Total no. of members: 25
- Member party: FET–JONS
- Status in legislature: One-party state

History
- Legislature term: 1st Cortes Españolas
- Budget: 1940, 1942, 1944, 1945
- Predecessor: Franco I
- Successor: Franco III

The second (Note: Sources differ on the numbering, depending on whether they consider every cabinet change or just major reshuffles as giving way to a different government. In this sense, some consider the 1939–1945 period as a single government under Franco (the second), whereas others split it into five separate ones: 1939–1941 (2nd), 1941–1942 (3rd), 1942–1943 (4th), 1943–1944 (5th) and 1944–1945 (6th).) government of Francisco Franco was formed on 9 August 1939, following the end of the Spanish Civil War. It succeeded the first Franco government and was the government of Spain from 9 August 1939 to 20 July 1945, a total of 2,172 days, or 5 years, 11 months and 11 days.

Coming to be known under various labels by the francoist-controlled media (such as the "Government of Peace" or the "Government of Victory"), the cabinet was made up of members from the different factions or "families" within the National Movement: mainly the FET y de las JONS party—the only legal political party during the Francoist regime—the military, the National Catholic Association of Propagandists (ACNP) and a number of aligned-nonpartisan figures from the civil service. The cabinet saw a large number of changes throughout its tenure, with two major cabinet reshuffles taking place in May 1941 and September 1942.

== Council of Ministers ==
The Council of Ministers was structured into the office for the prime minister and 15 ministries, including two ministers without portfolio.

← Franco II Government → (9 August 1939 – 20 July 1945)
| Portfolio | Name | Party | Took office | Left office | Ref. |
| Head of State; Prime Minister | Francisco Franco | Military | 30 January 1938 | 9 June 1973 | |
| Minister of Foreign Affairs | Juan Luis Beigbeder | Military | 9 August 1939 | 16 October 1940 | |
| Minister of Governance; Secretary of the Government of the State (Note: Until 21 October 1940.) | Ramón Serrano Suñer | FET–JONS | 1 January 1939 | 18 October 1940 | |
| Minister of the Army | José Enrique Varela | Military | 9 August 1939 | 3 September 1942 | |
| Minister of the Navy | Salvador Moreno Fernández | Military | 9 August 1939 | 20 July 1945 | |
| Minister of the Air | Juan Yagüe | Military | 9 August 1939 | 27 June 1940 | |
| Minister of Justice | Esteban Bilbao | FET–JONS^{/Trad.} | 9 August 1939 | 15 March 1943 | |
| Minister of Finance | José Larraz López | ACNP | 9 August 1939 | 19 May 1941 | |
| Minister of Industry and Trade | Luis Alarcón de la Lastra | Military | 9 August 1939 | 16 October 1940 | |
| Minister of Agriculture | Joaquín Benjumea | FET–JONS | 9 August 1939 | 19 May 1941 | |
| Minister of National Education | José Ibáñez Martín | ACNP | 9 August 1939 | 19 July 1951 | |
| Minister of Public Works | Alfonso Peña Boeuf | FET–JONS^{/NP} | 31 January 1938 | 20 July 1945 | |
| Minister of Labour | Joaquín Benjumea served in interim capacity from 9 August 1939 to 19 May 1941. | | | | |
| Minister Secretary-General of FET–JONS | Agustín Muñoz Grandes | Military | 9 August 1939 | 15 March 1940 | |
| Minister without portfolio Deputy Secretary-General of FET–JONS | Pedro Gamero del Castillo | FET–JONS^{/ACNP} | 9 August 1939 | 19 May 1941 | |
| Minister without portfolio | Rafael Sánchez Mazas | FET–JONS | 9 August 1939 | 15 August 1940 | |
=== Changes March 1940 ===
| Portfolio | Name | Faction | Took office | Left office | Ref. |
| Minister Secretary-General of FET–JONS | Vacant from 15 March 1940 to 19 May 1941. | | | | |
=== Changes June 1940 ===
| Portfolio | Name | Faction | Took office | Left office | Ref. |
| Minister of the Air | Juan Vigón | Military | 27 June 1940 | 20 July 1945 | |
=== Changes August 1940 ===
| Portfolio | Name | Faction | Took office | Left office | Ref. |
| ~~Minister without portfolio~~ | Discontinued on 15 August 1940 upon the officeholder's dismissal. | | | | |
=== Changes September 1940 ===
| Portfolio | Name | Faction | Took office | Left office | Ref. |
| Minister of Governance | Esteban Bilbao served in interim capacity from 12 September to 16 October 1940. | | | | |
=== Changes October 1940 ===
| Portfolio | Name | Faction | Took office | Left office | Ref. |
| Minister of Foreign Affairs | Ramón Serrano Suñer | FET–JONS | 16 October 1940 | 3 September 1942 | |
| Minister of Governance | José Lorente Sanz took on the ordinary discharge of duties from 16 October 1940 to 5 May 1941. | | | | |
| Minister of Industry and Trade | Demetrio Carceller Segura | FET–JONS | 16 October 1940 | 20 July 1945 | |
=== Changes May 1941 ===
| Portfolio | Name | Faction | Took office | Left office | Ref. |
| Minister of Governance | Valentín Galarza | Military | 5 May 1941 | 3 September 1942 | |
| Minister of Finance | Joaquín Benjumea | FET–JONS | 19 May 1941 | 19 July 1951 | |
| Minister of Agriculture | Miguel Primo de Rivera y Sáenz de Heredia | FET–JONS | 19 May 1941 | 20 July 1945 | |
| Minister of Labour | José Antonio Girón | FET–JONS | 19 May 1941 | 25 February 1957 | |
| Minister Secretary-General of FET–JONS | José Luis de Arrese | FET–JONS | 19 May 1941 | 20 July 1945 | |
| ~~Minister without portfolio~~ ~~Deputy Secretary-General of FET–JONS~~ | Discontinued on 19 May 1941 upon the officeholder's dismissal. | | | | |
=== Changes September 1942 ===
| Portfolio | Name | Faction | Took office | Left office | Ref. |
| Minister of Foreign Affairs | Francisco Gómez-Jordana | Military | 3 September 1942 | 3 August 1944† | |
| Minister of Governance | Blas Pérez González | FET–JONS | 3 September 1942 | 25 February 1957 | |
| Minister of the Army | Carlos Asensio Cabanillas | Military | 3 September 1942 | 20 July 1945 | |
=== Changes March 1943 ===
| Portfolio | Name | Faction | Took office | Left office | Ref. |
| Minister of Justice | Eduardo Aunós | FET–JONS | 15 March 1943 | 20 July 1945 | |
=== Changes August 1944 ===
| Portfolio | Name | Faction | Took office | Left office | Ref. |
| Minister of Foreign Affairs | José Félix de Lequerica | FET–JONS | 11 August 1944 | 20 July 1945 | |

== Departmental structure ==
Francisco Franco's second government was organised into several superior and governing units, whose number, powers and hierarchical structure varied depending on the ministerial department.

Unit/body rank

- (■) Undersecretary
- (■) Director-general
- (◆) Military & intelligence agency

| Office (Original name) | Portrait | Name | Took office | Left office | Alliance/party | Ref. |
=== Prime Minister's Office ===
| Prime Minister (Presidencia del Gobierno) | | Francisco Franco | 30 January 1938 | 9 June 1973 | FET–JONS (Military) | |
| Prime Minister (Presidencia del Gobierno) | 9 August 1939 –: (■) Undersecretariat of the Prime Minister's Office; (■) Directorate-General for the Geographic and Cadastral Institute; (■) Directorate-General for General Policy and Coordination; (■) Directorate-General for Morocco and Colonies (from 15 Jan 1942) | | | | | |
| Government Secretariat (Secretaría del Gobierno) | | Ramón Serrano Suñer | 2 February 1938 | 21 October 1940 | FET–JONS | |
| Government Secretariat (Secretaría del Gobierno) | See Ministry of Governance (9 August 1939 – 18 October 1940) | | | | | |
=== Ministry of Foreign Affairs ===
| Ministry of Foreign Affairs (Ministerio de Asuntos Exteriores) | | Juan Luis Beigbeder | 9 August 1939 | 16 October 1940 | FET–JONS (Military) | |
| Ministry of Foreign Affairs (Ministerio de Asuntos Exteriores) | | Ramón Serrano Suñer | 16 October 1940 | 3 September 1942 | FET–JONS | |
| Ministry of Foreign Affairs (Ministerio de Asuntos Exteriores) | | Francisco Gómez-Jordana | 3 September 1942 | 3 August 1944 (died in office) | FET–JONS (Military) | |
| Ministry of Foreign Affairs (Ministerio de Asuntos Exteriores) | | José Félix de Lequerica | 11 August 1944 | 20 July 1945 | FET–JONS | |
| Ministry of Foreign Affairs (Ministerio de Asuntos Exteriores) | 9 August 1939 – 16 October 1942: (■) Undersecretariat of Foreign Affairs; (■) Directorate-General for Policy and Treaties; (■) Directorate-General for Administrative Affairs; (■) Directorate-General for Morocco and Colonies (until 15 Jan 1942); 16 October 1942 – 31 December 1945: (■) Undersecretariat of Foreign Affairs; (■) Directorate-General for Foreign Policy; (■) Directorate-General for Economic Policy; (■) Directorate-General for General Affairs; (■) Directorate-General for America (from 9 Nov 1944); (■) Introducer of Ambassadors (from 9 Nov 1944) | | | | | |
=== Ministry of Governance ===
| Ministry of Governance (Ministerio de la Gobernación) | | Ramón Serrano Suñer | 1 January 1939 | 18 October 1940 | FET–JONS | |
| Ministry of Governance (Ministerio de la Gobernación) | | José Lorente Sanz (ordinary discharge of duties) | 16 October 1940 | 5 May 1941 | FET–JONS | |
| Ministry of Governance (Ministerio de la Gobernación) | | Valentín Galarza | 5 May 1941 | 3 September 1942 | FET–JONS (Military) | |
| Ministry of Governance (Ministerio de la Gobernación) | | Blas Pérez González | 3 September 1942 | 25 February 1957 | FET–JONS | |
| Ministry of Governance (Ministerio de la Gobernación) | 9 August – 23 September 1939: (■) Undersecretariat of the Interior; (■) Directorate-General for Internal Policy; (■) Directorate-General for Local Administration; (■) Directorate-General for Devastated Regions and Repairs; (■) Directorate-General for Charity and Social Works; (■) Directorate-General for Health; (■) Undersecretariat of Public Order; (■) Directorate-General for Security; (■) Directorate-General for Frontiers; (■) Directorate-General for Post and Telecommunication; (■) Directorate-General for Traffic Police; (■) Undersecretariat for Press and Propaganda; (■) Directorate-General for Press; (■) Directorate-General for Propaganda; (■) Directorate-General for Tourism; 23 September 1939 – 20 May 1941: (■) Undersecretariat of Governance; (■) Directorate-General for Local Administration; (■) Directorate-General for Internal Policy; (■) Directorate-General for Charity and Social Works; (■) Directorate-General for Health; (■) Directorate-General for Security; (■) Directorate-General for Post and Telecommunication; (■) Directorate-General for Architecture; (■) Directorate-General for Devastated Regions and Repairs; (■) Undersecretariat for Press and Propaganda; (■) Directorate-General for Press; (■) Directorate-General for Propaganda; (■) Directorate-General for Tourism; 20 May 1941 –: (■) Undersecretariat of Governance; (■) Directorate-General for Local Administration; (■) Directorate-General for Internal Policy; (■) Directorate-General for Charity and Social Works; (■) Directorate-General for Health; (■) Directorate-General for Security; (■) Directorate-General for Post and Telecommunication; (■) Directorate-General for Architecture; (■) Directorate-General for Devastated Regions and Repairs; (■) Directorate-General for Tourism | | | | | |
=== Ministry of the Army ===
| Ministry of the Army (Ministerio del Ejército) | | José Enrique Varela | 9 August 1939 | 3 September 1942 | FET–JONS (Military) | |
| Ministry of the Army (Ministerio del Ejército) | | Carlos Asensio Cabanillas | 3 September 1942 | 20 July 1945 | FET–JONS (Military) | |
| Ministry of the Army (Ministerio del Ejército) | 22 September 1939 – 12 July 1940: (◆) Army Staff–Chief of Staff of the Army; (■) General Secretariat of the Army; (■) Directorate-General for Military Teaching; (■) Directorate-General for Recruitment and Personnel; (■) Directorate-General for Industry and Materiel; (■) Directorate-General for Transports (Railways and Motor Racing); (■) Directorate-General for Services; (■) Directorate-General for Mutilated in War for the Homeland; (■) Inspectorate-General for Fortifications; (■) Inspectorate-General of the Civil Guard and Carabineros (disest. 15 Mar 1940); (■) Directorate-General of the Civil Guard (est. 15 Mar 1940); 12 July 1940 –: (◆) Army Staff–Chief of Staff of the Army; (■) Undersecretariat of the Army; (■) Directorate-General for Military Teaching; (■) Directorate-General for Recruitment and Personnel; (■) Directorate-General for Industry and Materiel; (■) Directorate-General for Transports (Railways and Motor Racing); (■) Directorate-General for Services; (■) Directorate-General for Fortifications and Works; (■) Directorate-General for Mutilated in War for the Homeland; (■) Directorate-General of the Civil Guard | | | | | |
=== Ministry of the Navy ===
| Ministry of the Navy (Ministerio de Marina) | | Salvador Moreno Fernández | 9 August 1939 | 3 September 1942 | FET–JONS (Military) | |
| Ministry of the Navy (Ministerio de Marina) | 16 August 1939 –: (◆) Navy Staff–Chief of Staff of the Navy; (■) General Secretariat of the Navy | | | | | |
=== Ministry of the Air ===
| Ministry of the Air (Ministerio del Aire) | | Juan Yagüe | 9 August 1939 | 27 June 1940 | FET–JONS (Military) | |
| Ministry of the Air (Ministerio del Aire) | | Juan Vigón | 27 June 1940 | 20 July 1945 | FET–JONS (Military) | |
| Ministry of the Air (Ministerio del Aire) | 1 September 1939 – 12 July 1940: (◆) Air Force Staff–Chief of Staff of the Air; (■) Undersecretariat of the Air; (■) Directorate-General for Personnel; (■) Directorate-General for Materiel; (■) Directorate-General for Infrastructure; (■) Directorate-General for Antiaeronautics; (■) Directorate-General for Civil Aviation; 12 July 1940 –: (◆) Air Force Staff–Chief of Staff of the Air; (■) General Secretariat of the Air; (■) Undersecretariat of the Air; (■) Directorate-General for Personnel; (■) Directorate-General for Instruction; (■) Directorate-General for Industry and Materiel; (■) Directorate-General for Civil Aviation; (■) Directorate-General for Infrastructure; (■) Directorate-General for Antiaeronautics | | | | | |
=== Ministry of Justice ===
| Ministry of Justice (Ministerio de Justicia) | | Esteban Bilbao | 9 August 1939 | 15 March 1943 | FET–JONS (Traditionalist) | |
| Ministry of Justice (Ministerio de Justicia) | | Eduardo Aunós | 15 March 1943 | 20 July 1945 | FET–JONS | |
=== Ministry of Finance ===
| Ministry of Finance (Ministerio de Hacienda) | | José Larraz López | 9 August 1939 | 19 May 1941 | FET–JONS (ACNP) | |
| Ministry of Finance (Ministerio de Hacienda) | | Joaquín Benjumea | 19 May 1941 | 19 July 1951 | FET–JONS | |
=== Ministry of Industry and Trade ===
| Ministry of Industry and Trade (Ministerio de Industria y Comercio) | | Luis Alarcón de la Lastra | 9 August 1939 | 16 October 1940 | FET–JONS (Military) | |
| Ministry of Industry and Trade (Ministerio de Industria y Comercio) | | Demetrio Carceller Segura | 16 October 1940 | 20 July 1945 | FET–JONS | |
=== Ministry of Agriculture ===
| Ministry of Agriculture (Ministerio de Agricultura) | | Joaquín Benjumea | 9 August 1939 | 19 May 1941 | FET–JONS | |
| Ministry of Agriculture (Ministerio de Agricultura) | | Miguel Primo de Rivera y Sáenz de Heredia | 19 May 1941 | 20 July 1945 | FET–JONS | |
=== Ministry of National Education ===
| Ministry of National Education (Ministerio de Educación Nacional) | | José Ibáñez Martín | 9 August 1939 | 19 July 1951 | FET–JONS (ACNP) | |
=== Ministry of Public Works ===
| Ministry of Public Works (Ministerio de Obras Públicas) | | Alfonso Peña Boeuf | 31 January 1938 | 20 July 1945 | FET–JONS (Nonpartisan) | |
=== Ministry of Labour ===
| Ministry of Labour (Ministerio de Trabajo) | | Joaquín Benjumea (interim) | 9 August 1939 | 19 May 1941 | FET–JONS | |
| Ministry of Labour (Ministerio de Trabajo) | | José Antonio Girón | 19 May 1941 | 25 February 1957 | FET–JONS | |
| Ministry of Labour (Ministerio de Trabajo) | 9 August 1939 –: (■) Undersecretariat of Labour; (■) Directorate-General for Labour; (■) Directorate-General for Labour Jurisdiction; (■) Directorate-General for Forecast; (■) Directorate-General for Statistics | | | | | |
=== Minister Secretary-General of FET–JONS ===
| Minister Secretary-General of FET–JONS (Ministro Secretario General de FET y de las JONS) | | Agustín Muñoz Grandes | 9 August 1939 | 15 March 1940 | FET–JONS (Military) | |
| Minister Secretary-General of FET–JONS (Ministro Secretario General de FET y de las JONS) | | José Luis de Arrese | 19 May 1941 | 20 July 1945 | FET–JONS | |
=== Ministers without portfolio ===
| Minister Deputy Secretary-General of FET–JONS, without portfolio (Ministro Vicesecretario General de FET y de las JONS, sin cartera) (until 19 May 1941) | | Pedro Gamero del Castillo | 9 August 1939 | 19 May 1941 | FET–JONS (also a member of ACNP) | |
| Minister without portfolio (Ministro sin cartera) (until 15 August 1940) | | Rafael Sánchez Mazas | 9 August 1939 | 15 August 1940 | FET–JONS | |

== Bibliography ==
- Sánchez Recio, Glicerio (2013). "Familias políticas, estructuras de poder, instituciones del régimen". In Ruiz Carnicer, Miguel Ángel (ed.). Falange, las culturas políticas del fascismo en la España de Franco (1936-1975) (in Spanish). Vol. 1. Clarendon Press, University of Oxford. pp. 217–229. ISBN 978-84-9911-216-9.

| Preceded by Franco I | Government of Spain; 1939–1945 | Succeeded by Franco III |
