= List of solicitors general of Spain =

Coat of arms of the Spanish State Lawyers Corps

This is a list of the Spanish people that have served as solicitor (or attorney) general since the 19th century and, as such, head of the Office of the Solicitor General of the State (Spanish: Abogacía General del Estado), the government agency responsible for providing legal advice to the Spanish government and other State institutions, as well as defending them before the courts of justice.

== Introduction ==
The origin of this position goes back to the 18th century, when by Royal Order of 13 May 1786, Antonio María Lozano, Prosecutor of the Council of Finance, was appointed as the first "Advisor to the General Superintendency of Finance". During the first half of the 19th century, the Superintendency of Finance was abolished and it was decided to unify all advisory powers under a new administrative body, the Directorate-General for Public Treasury Litigation (Spanish: Dirección General de lo Contencioso de la Hacienda Pública) and, at the same time, its advisors were granted the power to represent the public treasury before the courts of justice, giving rise to the current figure of the "Solicitor General of the State".

Over time, the Solicitor General went from advising only the Public Treasury to advising the entire government apparatus, becoming the head of the State's Legal Service. Today, the solicitor general answers to the minister of justice.

== List of solicitors general ==
For the purpose of this list, the date used is the date on which the decree of appointment or dismissal received royal assent, which may differ from the date of publication or of the effective taking of office.

Denotes an Acting Solicitor General.

Name	Start	End	Duration	Party	Government		Ref.
Ventura González Romero (1796–1870)	28 December 1849	14 January 1851	1 year, 17 days	Moderate	The Duke of Valencia	Isabella II (1833–1868)	
Nicolás de Mélida y Lizana (1812–1863)	14 January 1851	9 February 1851	26 days	Moderate	Juan Bravo Murillo	Isabella II (1833–1868)	
Antonio Pérez de Herrasti y Pérez de Herrasti (1860–1902)	9 February 1851	25 October 1853	2 years, 258 days	Moderate	Juan Bravo Murillo	Isabella II (1833–1868)	
Antonio Pérez de Herrasti y Pérez de Herrasti (1860–1902)	9 February 1851	25 October 1853	2 years, 258 days	Moderate	The Count of Alcoy	Isabella II (1833–1868)	
Antonio Pérez de Herrasti y Pérez de Herrasti (1860–1902)	9 February 1851	25 October 1853	2 years, 258 days	Moderate	Francisco de Lersundi y Hormaechea	Isabella II (1833–1868)	
Antonio Pérez de Herrasti y Pérez de Herrasti (1860–1902)	9 February 1851	25 October 1853	2 years, 258 days	Moderate	The Count of San Luis	Isabella II (1833–1868)	
José Juan Navarro González (1811–1880s)	25 October 1853	14 July 1854	262 days	Moderate	The Count of San Luis	Isabella II (1833–1868)	
José Juan Navarro González (1811–1880s)	25 October 1853	14 July 1854	262 days	Moderate	The Marquess of Mendigorría	Isabella II (1833–1868)	
José Juan Navarro González (1811–1880s)	25 October 1853	14 July 1854	262 days	Moderate	The Duke of Rivas	Isabella II (1833–1868)	
No appointments during this interval.					The Duke of Rivas	Isabella II (1833–1868)	
No appointments during this interval.					The Prince of Vergara	Isabella II (1833–1868)	
Jacobo Ulloa de las Riberas (1800–1877)	3 November 1854	18 October 1856	1 year, 350 days	Independent	The Prince of Vergara	Isabella II (1833–1868)	
Jacobo Ulloa de las Riberas (1800–1877)	3 November 1854	18 October 1856	1 year, 350 days	Independent	The Duke of Tetuán	Isabella II (1833–1868)	
Jacobo Ulloa de las Riberas (1800–1877)	3 November 1854	18 October 1856	1 year, 350 days	Independent	The Duke of Valencia	Isabella II (1833–1868)	
Antonio Pérez de Herrasti y Pérez de Herrasti (1860–1902)	18 October 1856	6 May 1858	1 year, 200 days	Moderate	The Duke of Valencia	Isabella II (1833–1868)	
Antonio Pérez de Herrasti y Pérez de Herrasti (1860–1902)	18 October 1856	6 May 1858	1 year, 200 days	Moderate	The Marquess of Nervión	Isabella II (1833–1868)	
Antonio Pérez de Herrasti y Pérez de Herrasti (1860–1902)	18 October 1856	6 May 1858	1 year, 200 days	Moderate	Francisco Javier de Istúriz	Isabella II (1833–1868)	
Francisco de Cárdenas Espejo (1817–1898)	6 May 1858	3 November 1863	5 years, 181 days	Moderado	Francisco Javier de Istúriz	Isabella II (1833–1868)	
Francisco de Cárdenas Espejo (1817–1898)	6 May 1858	3 November 1863	5 years, 181 days	Moderado	The Duke of Tetuán	Isabella II (1833–1868)	
Francisco de Cárdenas Espejo (1817–1898)	6 May 1858	3 November 1863	5 years, 181 days	Moderado	The Marquess of Miraflores	Isabella II (1833–1868)	
Juan Bautista Trúpita (1815–1873)	5 November 1863	17 January 1864	73 days	Moderate	The Marquess of Miraflores	Isabella II (1833–1868)	
Antonio Remón Zarco del Valle y Huet (1785–1866)	17 January 1864	22 January 1864	5 days	Moderate	Lorenzo Arrazola y García	Isabella II (1833–1868)	
Rafael Ramírez de Arellano (?–1885)	22 January 1864	28 August 1864	219 days	Moderate	Lorenzo Arrazola y García	Isabella II (1833–1868)	
Rafael Ramírez de Arellano (?–1885)	22 January 1864	28 August 1864	219 days	Moderate	Alejandro Mon y Menéndez	Isabella II (1833–1868)	
Ambrosio González y Rodríguez (1808–1881)	28 August 1864	22 February 1865	178 days	Moderate	Alejandro Mon y Menéndez	Isabella II (1833–1868)	
Ambrosio González y Rodríguez (1808–1881)	28 August 1864	22 February 1865	178 days	Moderate	The Duke of Valencia	Isabella II (1833–1868)	
Felipe Vereterra y Carreño (1816–1877)	22 February 1865	1 July 1865 (Note: This is an estimated date. It has not been possible to find Felipe Vereterra y Carreño's dismissal, but in mid-August 1865 the Junta de Clases Pasivas (the agency that managed the pensions of public employees) published his records, stating that he had accumulated 4 months and 9 days of service as advisor-general.)	129 days	Independent	The Duke of Valencia	Isabella II (1833–1868)	
Felipe Vereterra y Carreño (1816–1877)	22 February 1865	1 July 1865	129 days	Independent	The Duke of Tetuán	Isabella II (1833–1868)	
Antonio Remón Zarco del Valle y Huet (1785–1866)	1 July 1865	15 October 1865	106 days	Moderate	The Duke of Tetuán	Isabella II (1833–1868)	
Vicente Hernández de la Rua (1806–1890)	15 October 1865	15 July 1866	273 days	Moderate	The Duke of Tetuán	Isabella II (1833–1868)	
Vicente Hernández de la Rua (1806–1890)	15 October 1865	15 July 1866	273 days	Moderate	The Duke of Valencia†	Isabella II (1833–1868)	
Benito Plá y Cancela (1812–1874)	15 July 1866	6 August 1868	2 years, 22 days	Moderate	The Duke of Valencia†	Isabella II (1833–1868)	
Benito Plá y Cancela (1812–1874)	15 July 1866	6 August 1868	2 years, 22 days	Moderate	Luis González Bravo	Isabella II (1833–1868)	
Ignacio Páez Jaramillo	23 August 1868	9 October 1868	47 days	Independent	Luis González Bravo	Isabella II (1833–1868)	
Ignacio Páez Jaramillo	23 August 1868	9 October 1868	47 days	Independent	The Marquess of Havana	Isabella II (1833–1868)	
Ignacio Páez Jaramillo	23 August 1868	9 October 1868	47 days	Independent	The Duke of the Tower	The Duke of the Tower (regent) (1869–1871)	
Antonio Ramos Calderón (1835–1904)	5 November 1868 (Note: Republican politician Francisco García López (1824–1878) was appointed Advisor-General on 27 October 1868, but he did not accept the office.)	30 June 1869	237 days	Independent	The Duke of the Tower	The Duke of the Tower (regent) (1869–1871)	
Antonio Ramos Calderón (1835–1904)	5 November 1868	30 June 1869	237 days	Independent	The Marquess of Castillejos	The Duke of the Tower (regent) (1869–1871)	
Office disestablished during this interval.
Justo Pelayo de la Cuesta Núñez (1823–1889)	26 July 1874	5 January 1875	163 days	Constitutionalist	The Marquess of Sierra Bullones	List of presidents of the First Republic	
Justo Pelayo de la Cuesta Núñez (1823–1889)	26 July 1874	5 January 1875	163 days	Constitutionalist	Práxedes Mateo Sagasta	Alfonso XII (1874–1885)	
Manuel Núñez de Haro	5 January 1875	15 January 1875	10 days	Independent	Práxedes Mateo Sagasta	Alfonso XII (1874–1885)	
Emilio Cánovas del Castillo (Note: During his absence (23 July to 23 August 1877), Juan de la Concha Castañeda, Director-General for State Properties and Rights, replaced him in his functions as director-general, while Fernando de Madrazo y Kuntz, First Co-advisor, replaced him in his advisory functions.) (1832–1910)	15 January 1875	2 March 1878	3 years, 46 days	Conservative	Práxedes Mateo Sagasta	Alfonso XII (1874–1885)	
Emilio Cánovas del Castillo (1832–1910)	15 January 1875	2 March 1878	3 years, 46 days	Conservative	Antonio Cánovas del Castillo	Alfonso XII (1874–1885)	
Emilio Cánovas del Castillo (1832–1910)	15 January 1875	2 March 1878	3 years, 46 days	Conservative	Joaquín Jovellar y Soler	Alfonso XII (1874–1885)	
Emilio Cánovas del Castillo (1832–1910)	15 January 1875	2 March 1878	3 years, 46 days	Conservative	Antonio Cánovas del Castillo	Alfonso XII (1874–1885)	
Antonino Sánchez de Milla (Note: During his absence: Fernando Cos-Gayón, Under-Secretary (18 August to 19 September 1879).) (1832–1880)	2 March 1878	10 May 1880†	2 years, 69 days	Conservative	Antonio Cánovas del Castillo	Alfonso XII (1874–1885)	
Antonino Sánchez de Milla (1832–1880)	2 March 1878	10 May 1880†	2 years, 69 days	Conservative	Arsenio Martínez Campos	Alfonso XII (1874–1885)	
Antonino Sánchez de Milla (1832–1880)	2 March 1878	10 May 1880†	2 years, 69 days	Conservative	Antonio Cánovas del Castillo	Alfonso XII (1874–1885)	
Fernando de Madrazo y Kuntz (1820–1895)	10 May 1880	22 June 1880	43 days	Independent	Antonio Cánovas del Castillo	Alfonso XII (1874–1885)	
Saturnino Arenillas Paredes (?–1890)	22 June 1880	14 February 1881	237 days	Conservative	Antonio Cánovas del Castillo	Alfonso XII (1874–1885)	
Saturnino Arenillas Paredes (?–1890)	22 June 1880	14 February 1881	237 days	Conservative	Práxedes Mateo Sagasta	Alfonso XII (1874–1885)	
José Gallostra y Frau (1833–1888)	14 February 1881	17 September 1881	215 days	Liberal	Práxedes Mateo Sagasta	Alfonso XII (1874–1885)	
The Count of Albox (1842–1931)	17 September 1881	4 October 1881	17 days	Liberal	Práxedes Mateo Sagasta	Alfonso XII (1874–1885)	
Miguel Monares Insa	4 October 1881	31 December 1881	88 days	Independent	Práxedes Mateo Sagasta	Alfonso XII (1874–1885)	
Manuel Núñez de Haro	31 December 1881	11 January 1883	1 year, 11 days	Liberal	Práxedes Mateo Sagasta	Alfonso XII (1874–1885)	
Miguel Monares Insa	11 January 1883	16 January 1883	5 days	Independent	Práxedes Mateo Sagasta	Alfonso XII (1874–1885)	
Manuel Díaz Valdés	16 January 1883	12 March 1883	55 days	Independent	Práxedes Mateo Sagasta	Alfonso XII (1874–1885)	
Federico Pons y Montells (Note: During his absence: Manuel Nuñez de Haro, Under-Secretary (23 July to 20 August 1883).) (1838–1902)	12 March 1883	22 January 1884	316 days	Liberal	Práxedes Mateo Sagasta	Alfonso XII (1874–1885)	
Federico Pons y Montells (1838–1902)	12 March 1883	22 January 1884	316 days	Liberal	José Posada Herrera	Alfonso XII (1874–1885)	
Federico Pons y Montells (1838–1902)	12 March 1883	22 January 1884	316 days	Liberal	Antonio Cánovas del Castillo	Alfonso XII (1874–1885)	
Miguel Monares Insa	22 January 1884	29 January 1884	7 days	Independent	Antonio Cánovas del Castillo	Alfonso XII (1874–1885)	
José de Cárdenas Uriarte (Note: During his absence: Plácido de Jove y Hevia, Viscount of Campo Grande, Under-Secretary (16 August to 12 September 1884).) (1846–1907)	29 January 1884	1 December 1885	1 year, 306 days	Conservative	Antonio Cánovas del Castillo	Alfonso XII (1874–1885)	
José de Cárdenas Uriarte (1846–1907)	29 January 1884	1 December 1885	1 year, 306 days	Conservative	Práxedes Mateo Sagasta	Alfonso XIII (1886–1931)	
Fidel García Lomas (Note: During his absence: Manuel de Eguilior y Llaguno, Count of Albox, Under-Secretary (13 March to 7 April 1886).) (1828–1893)	3 December 1885	21 October 1886	322 days	Independent	Práxedes Mateo Sagasta	Alfonso XIII (1886–1931)	
Manuel Gómez Marín (1836–1902)	21 October 1886	13 September 1888	1 year, 328 days	Liberal	Práxedes Mateo Sagasta	Alfonso XIII (1886–1931)	
José María Carrascosa y Carrión (?–1901)	13 September 1888	30 September 1888	17 days	Independent	Práxedes Mateo Sagasta	Alfonso XIII (1886–1931)	
José María Jimeno de Lerma (1836–1905)	30 September 1888	4 October 1890	2 years, 4 days	Liberal	Práxedes Mateo Sagasta	Alfonso XIII (1886–1931)	
José María Jimeno de Lerma (1836–1905)	30 September 1888	4 October 1890	2 years, 4 days	Liberal	Antonio Cánovas del Castillo	Alfonso XIII (1886–1931)	
The Marquess of Vadillo (1848–1919)	4 October 1890	27 November 1891	1 year, 54 days	Conservative	Antonio Cánovas del Castillo	Alfonso XIII (1886–1931)	
Fermín Hernández Iglesias (1833–1909)	27 November 1891	20 December 1892	1 year, 23 days	Conservative	Antonio Cánovas del Castillo	Alfonso XIII (1886–1931)	
Fermín Hernández Iglesias (1833–1909)	27 November 1891	20 December 1892	1 year, 23 days	Conservative	Práxedes Mateo Sagasta	Alfonso XIII (1886–1931)	
Juan Rosell y Rubert (1852–1925)	20 December 1892	22 March 1895	2 years, 92 days	Liberal	Práxedes Mateo Sagasta	Alfonso XIII (1886–1931)	
Antonio Fidalgo Sánchez-Ocaña (1852–1934)	22 March 1895	11 July 1895	111 days	Independent	Práxedes Mateo Sagasta	Alfonso XIII (1886–1931)	
Antonio Fidalgo Sánchez-Ocaña (1852–1934)	22 March 1895	11 July 1895	111 days	Independent	Antonio Cánovas del Castillo†	Alfonso XIII (1886–1931)	
The Marquess of Figueroa (1861–1932)	11 July 1895	19 October 1897	2 years, 100 days	Conservative	Antonio Cánovas del Castillo†	Alfonso XIII (1886–1931)	
The Marquess of Figueroa (1861–1932)	11 July 1895	19 October 1897	2 years, 100 days	Conservative	Marcelo Azcárraga	Alfonso XIII (1886–1931)	
The Marquess of Figueroa (1861–1932)	11 July 1895	19 October 1897	2 years, 100 days	Conservative	Práxedes Mateo Sagasta	Alfonso XIII (1886–1931)	
The Marquess of Alhucemas (1859–1938)	19 October 1897	31 May 1898	224 days	Liberal	Práxedes Mateo Sagasta	Alfonso XIII (1886–1931)	
Antonio Fidalgo Sánchez-Ocaña (1852–1934)	31 May 1898	1 July 1898	31 days	Independent	Práxedes Mateo Sagasta	Alfonso XIII (1886–1931)	
Álvaro López Mora (1853–1917)	1 July 1898	9 March 1899	251 days	Liberal	Práxedes Mateo Sagasta	Alfonso XIII (1886–1931)	
Álvaro López Mora (1853–1917)	1 July 1898	9 March 1899	251 days	Liberal	Francisco Silvela	Alfonso XIII (1886–1931)	
Federico Arrazola y Guerrero (1846–1913)	9 March 1899	29 April 1899	51 days	Conservative	Francisco Silvela	Alfonso XIII (1886–1931)	
Federico de Arriaga y del Arco (?–1914)	29 April 1899	21 May 1901	2 years, 22 days	Conservative	Francisco Silvela	Alfonso XIII (1886–1931)	
Federico de Arriaga y del Arco (?–1914)	29 April 1899	21 May 1901	2 years, 22 days	Conservative	Marcelo Azcárraga	Alfonso XIII (1886–1931)	
Federico de Arriaga y del Arco (?–1914)	29 April 1899	21 May 1901	2 years, 22 days	Conservative	Práxedes Mateo Sagasta	Alfonso XIII (1886–1931)	
Antonio Fidalgo Sánchez-Ocaña (1852–1934)	21 May 1901	15 September 1910	9 years, 117 days	Independent	Práxedes Mateo Sagasta	Alfonso XIII (1886–1931)	
Antonio Fidalgo Sánchez-Ocaña (1852–1934)	21 May 1901	15 September 1910	9 years, 117 days	Independent	Francisco Silvela	Alfonso XIII (1886–1931)	
Antonio Fidalgo Sánchez-Ocaña (1852–1934)	21 May 1901	15 September 1910	9 years, 117 days	Independent	The Marquess of Pozo Rubio	Alfonso XIII (1886–1931)	
Antonio Fidalgo Sánchez-Ocaña (1852–1934)	21 May 1901	15 September 1910	9 years, 117 days	Independent	Antonio Maura	Alfonso XIII (1886–1931)	
Antonio Fidalgo Sánchez-Ocaña (1852–1934)	21 May 1901	15 September 1910	9 years, 117 days	Independent	Marcelo Azcárraga	Alfonso XIII (1886–1931)	
Antonio Fidalgo Sánchez-Ocaña (1852–1934)	21 May 1901	15 September 1910	9 years, 117 days	Independent	The Marquess of Pozo Rubio	Alfonso XIII (1886–1931)	
Antonio Fidalgo Sánchez-Ocaña (1852–1934)	21 May 1901	15 September 1910	9 years, 117 days	Independent	Eugenio Montero Ríos	Alfonso XIII (1886–1931)	
Antonio Fidalgo Sánchez-Ocaña (1852–1934)	21 May 1901	15 September 1910	9 years, 117 days	Independent	Segismundo Moret	Alfonso XIII (1886–1931)	
Antonio Fidalgo Sánchez-Ocaña (1852–1934)	21 May 1901	15 September 1910	9 years, 117 days	Independent	José López Domínguez	Alfonso XIII (1886–1931)	
Antonio Fidalgo Sánchez-Ocaña (1852–1934)	21 May 1901	15 September 1910	9 years, 117 days	Independent	Segismundo Moret	Alfonso XIII (1886–1931)	
Antonio Fidalgo Sánchez-Ocaña (1852–1934)	21 May 1901	15 September 1910	9 years, 117 days	Independent	The Marquess of Vega de Armijo	Alfonso XIII (1886–1931)	
Antonio Fidalgo Sánchez-Ocaña (1852–1934)	21 May 1901	15 September 1910	9 years, 117 days	Independent	Antonio Maura	Alfonso XIII (1886–1931)	
Antonio Fidalgo Sánchez-Ocaña (1852–1934)	21 May 1901	15 September 1910	9 years, 117 days	Independent	Segismundo Moret	Alfonso XIII (1886–1931)	
Antonio Fidalgo Sánchez-Ocaña (1852–1934)	21 May 1901	15 September 1910	9 years, 117 days	Independent	José Canalejas y Méndez†	Alfonso XIII (1886–1931)	
Pablo Garnica y Echevarría (1876–1959)	15 September 1910	30 June 1913	2 years, 288 days	Liberal	José Canalejas y Méndez†	Alfonso XIII (1886–1931)	
Pablo Garnica y Echevarría (1876–1959)	15 September 1910	30 June 1913	2 years, 288 days	Liberal	The Marquess of Alhucemas (Note: He acted as acting prime minister after the assassination of José Canalejas on 12 November 1912)	Alfonso XIII (1886–1931)	
Pablo Garnica y Echevarría (1876–1959)	15 September 1910	30 June 1913	2 years, 288 days	Liberal	The Count of Romanones	Alfonso XIII (1886–1931)	
Antonio Fidalgo Sánchez-Ocaña (1852–1934)	30 June 1913	23 March 1915	1 year, 266 days	Independent	The Count of Romanones	Alfonso XIII (1886–1931)	
Antonio Fidalgo Sánchez-Ocaña (1852–1934)	30 June 1913	23 March 1915	1 year, 266 days	Independent	Eduardo Dato	Alfonso XIII (1886–1931)	
Nicanor de las Alas Pumariño (1870–1935)	23 March 1915	18 December 1915	270 days	Conservative	Eduardo Dato	Alfonso XIII (1886–1931)	
Nicanor de las Alas Pumariño (1870–1935)	23 March 1915	18 December 1915	270 days	Conservative	The Count of Romanones	Alfonso XIII (1886–1931)	
Federico Marín y López (1850s–1920s)	18 December 1915	27 September 1920	4 years, 284 days	Independent	The Count of Romanones	Alfonso XIII (1886–1931)	
Federico Marín y López (1850s–1920s)	18 December 1915	27 September 1920	4 years, 284 days	Independent	The Marquess of Alhucemas	Alfonso XIII (1886–1931)	
Federico Marín y López (1850s–1920s)	18 December 1915	27 September 1920	4 years, 284 days	Independent	Eduardo Dato	Alfonso XIII (1886–1931)	
Federico Marín y López (1850s–1920s)	18 December 1915	27 September 1920	4 years, 284 days	Independent	The Marquess of Alhucemas	Alfonso XIII (1886–1931)	
Federico Marín y López (1850s–1920s)	18 December 1915	27 September 1920	4 years, 284 days	Independent	Antonio Maura	Alfonso XIII (1886–1931)	
Federico Marín y López (1850s–1920s)	18 December 1915	27 September 1920	4 years, 284 days	Independent	The Marquess of Alhucemas	Alfonso XIII (1886–1931)	
Federico Marín y López (1850s–1920s)	18 December 1915	27 September 1920	4 years, 284 days	Independent	The Count of Romanones	Alfonso XIII (1886–1931)	
Federico Marín y López (1850s–1920s)	18 December 1915	27 September 1920	4 years, 284 days	Independent	Antonio Maura	Alfonso XIII (1886–1931)	
Federico Marín y López (1850s–1920s)	18 December 1915	27 September 1920	4 years, 284 days	Independent	Joaquín Sánchez de Toca	Alfonso XIII (1886–1931)	
Federico Marín y López (1850s–1920s)	18 December 1915	27 September 1920	4 years, 284 days	Independent	Manuel Allendesalazar	Alfonso XIII (1886–1931)	
Federico Marín y López (1850s–1920s)	18 December 1915	27 September 1920	4 years, 284 days	Independent	Eduardo Dato†	Alfonso XIII (1886–1931)	
Juan Díaz de la Sala	27 September 1920	13 October 1920	2 years, 98 days	Independent	Eduardo Dato†	Alfonso XIII (1886–1931)	
Juan Díaz de la Sala	27 September 1920	13 October 1920	2 years, 98 days	Independent	The Count of Bugallal (Note: He acted acting prime minister after the assassination of Eduardo Dato from March 8 to March 13, 1921)	Alfonso XIII (1886–1931)	
Juan Díaz de la Sala	27 September 1920	13 October 1920	2 years, 98 days	Independent	Manuel Allendesalazar	Alfonso XIII (1886–1931)	
Juan Díaz de la Sala	13 October 1920	3 January 1923	2 years, 98 days	Independent	Antonio Maura	Alfonso XIII (1886–1931)	
Juan Díaz de la Sala	13 October 1920	3 January 1923	2 years, 98 days	Independent	José Sánchez-Guerra y Martínez	Alfonso XIII (1886–1931)	
Juan Díaz de la Sala	13 October 1920	3 January 1923	2 years, 98 days	Independent	The Marquess of Alhucemas	Alfonso XIII (1886–1931)	
Antonio Fidalgo de Solís (1878–1928)	3 January 1923	30 January 1923	3 years, 232 days	Liberal	The Marquess of Alhucemas	Alfonso XIII (1886–1931)	
Antonio Fidalgo de Solís (1878–1928)	3 January 1923	30 January 1923	3 years, 232 days	Liberal	The Marquess of Estella	Alfonso XIII (1886–1931)	
Antonio Fidalgo de Solís (1878–1928)	30 January 1923	23 August 1926	3 years, 232 days	Liberal	The Marquess of Estella	Alfonso XIII (1886–1931)	
The Count of Santamaría de Paredes (–1961)	23 August 1926	16 April 1931	4 years, 236 days	Independent	The Marquess of Estella	Alfonso XIII (1886–1931)	
The Count of Santamaría de Paredes (–1961)	23 August 1926	16 April 1931	4 years, 236 days	Independent	The Count of Xauen	Alfonso XIII (1886–1931)	
The Count of Santamaría de Paredes (–1961)	23 August 1926	16 April 1931	4 years, 236 days	Independent	Juan Bautista Aznar-Cabañas	Alfonso XIII (1886–1931)	
The Count of Santamaría de Paredes (–1961)	23 August 1926	16 April 1931	4 years, 236 days	Independent	Niceto Alcalá-Zamora	Niceto Alcalá-Zamora (1931–1936)	
Valeriano Casanueva Picazo (1889–1941)	16 April 1931	11 March 1933	1 year, 329 days	Socialist	Niceto Alcalá-Zamora	Niceto Alcalá-Zamora (1931–1936)	
Valeriano Casanueva Picazo (1889–1941)	16 April 1931	11 March 1933	1 year, 329 days	Socialist	Manuel Azaña	Niceto Alcalá-Zamora (1931–1936)	
Luis Martínez Sureda (1876–1950s)	11 March 1933	13 June 1934	1 year, 94 days	Independent	Manuel Azaña	Niceto Alcalá-Zamora (1931–1936)	
Luis Martínez Sureda (1876–1950s)	11 March 1933	13 June 1934	1 year, 94 days	Independent	Alejandro Lerroux	Niceto Alcalá-Zamora (1931–1936)	
Luis Martínez Sureda (1876–1950s)	11 March 1933	13 June 1934	1 year, 94 days	Independent	Diego Martínez Barrio	Niceto Alcalá-Zamora (1931–1936)	
Luis Martínez Sureda (1876–1950s)	11 March 1933	13 June 1934	1 year, 94 days	Independent	Alejandro Lerroux	Niceto Alcalá-Zamora (1931–1936)	
Luis Martínez Sureda (1876–1950s)	11 March 1933	13 June 1934	1 year, 94 days	Independent	Ricardo Samper	Niceto Alcalá-Zamora (1931–1936)	
Baldomero de Campo-Redondo y Fernández (1885–1957)	19 June 1934	27 February 1936	1 year, 259 days	Independent	Ricardo Samper	Niceto Alcalá-Zamora (1931–1936)	
Baldomero de Campo-Redondo y Fernández (1885–1957)	19 June 1934	27 February 1936	1 year, 259 days	Independent	Alejandro Lerroux	Niceto Alcalá-Zamora (1931–1936)	
Baldomero de Campo-Redondo y Fernández (1885–1957)	19 June 1934	27 February 1936	1 year, 259 days	Independent	Joaquín Chapaprieta	Niceto Alcalá-Zamora (1931–1936)	
Baldomero de Campo-Redondo y Fernández (1885–1957)	19 June 1934	27 February 1936	1 year, 259 days	Independent	Manuel Portela Valladares	Niceto Alcalá-Zamora (1931–1936)	
Baldomero de Campo-Redondo y Fernández (1885–1957)	19 June 1934	27 February 1936	1 year, 259 days	Independent	Manuel Azaña	Niceto Alcalá-Zamora (1931–1936)	
Luis de la Peña y Costa	27 February 1936	15 September 1936	201 days	Independent	Manuel Azaña	Niceto Alcalá-Zamora (1931–1936)	
Luis de la Peña y Costa	27 February 1936	15 September 1936	201 days	Independent	Augusto Barcia Trelles (Note: Acting prime minister from 10 to 13 May 1936)	Manuel Azaña (1936–1939)	
Luis de la Peña y Costa	27 February 1936	15 September 1936	201 days	Independent	Santiago Casares Quiroga	Manuel Azaña (1936–1939)	
Luis de la Peña y Costa	27 February 1936	15 September 1936	201 days	Independent	Diego Martínez Barrio	Manuel Azaña (1936–1939)	
Luis de la Peña y Costa	27 February 1936	15 September 1936	201 days	Independent	José Giral	Manuel Azaña (1936–1939)	
Luis de la Peña y Costa	27 February 1936	15 September 1936	201 days	Independent	Francisco Largo Caballero	Manuel Azaña (1936–1939)	
José Prat García (1905–1994)	15 September 1936	27 May 1937	254 days	Socialist	Francisco Largo Caballero	Manuel Azaña (1936–1939)	
José Prat García (1905–1994)	15 September 1936	27 May 1937	254 days	Socialist	Juan Negrín	Manuel Azaña (1936–1939)	
Due to the Civil War, it is not possible to determine who assumed the office during this interval.					Juan Negrín	Manuel Azaña (1936–1939)	
Eleazar Huerta Valcárcel (1903–1974)	15 October 1937	31 March 1939	1 year, 167 days	Socialist	Juan Negrín	Manuel Azaña (1936–1939)	
Eleazar Huerta Valcárcel (1903–1974)	15 October 1937	31 March 1939	1 year, 167 days	Socialist	National Defence Council	José Miaja (1939)	
Pedro Alfaro y Alfaro (Note: Solicitor General of the Rebel side.) (1884–1969)	2 February 1938	3 September 1941	3 years, 213 days	National Movement	Franco I	Francisco Franco (1939–1975)	
Pedro Alfaro y Alfaro (1884–1969)	2 February 1938	3 September 1941	3 years, 213 days	National Movement	Franco II	Francisco Franco (1939–1975)	
José María de Lapuerta y de las Pozas (1896–1968)	3 September 1941	16 October 1942	1 year, 43 days	National Movement	Franco II	Francisco Franco (1939–1975)	
Francisco Gómez de Llano (1896–1970)	16 October 1942	19 July 1951	8 years, 276 days	National Movement	Franco II	Francisco Franco (1939–1975)	
Francisco Gómez de Llano (1896–1970)	16 October 1942	19 July 1951	8 years, 276 days	National Movement	Franco III	Francisco Franco (1939–1975)	
José Fernández Arroyo Caro (1894–1979)	27 July 1951	8 March 1957	5 years, 224 days	National Movement	Franco IV	Francisco Franco (1939–1975)	
José Fernández Arroyo Caro (1894–1979)	27 July 1951	8 March 1957	5 years, 224 days	National Movement	Franco V	Francisco Franco (1939–1975)	
José María Zabia Pérez (1899–1986)	8 March 1957	15 November 1963	6 years, 252 days	National Movement	Franco V	Francisco Franco (1939–1975)	
José María Zabia Pérez (1899–1986)	8 March 1957	15 November 1963	6 years, 252 days	National Movement	Franco VI	Francisco Franco (1939–1975)	
Luis Peralta España (1916–1993)	15 November 1963	25 February 1966	2 years, 102 days	National Movement	Franco VI	Francisco Franco (1939–1975)	
Luis Peralta España (1916–1993)	15 November 1963	25 February 1966	2 years, 102 days	National Movement	Franco VII	Francisco Franco (1939–1975)	
Juan Antonio Ollero de la Rosa (1915–1997)	25 February 1966	20 April 1968	2 years, 55 days	National Movement	Franco VII	Francisco Franco (1939–1975)	
José María Tejera Victory (1917–1995)	4 May 1968	9 February 1973	4 years, 281 days	National Movement	Franco VII	Francisco Franco (1939–1975)	
José María Tejera Victory (1917–1995)	4 May 1968	9 February 1973	4 years, 281 days	National Movement	Franco VIII	Francisco Franco (1939–1975)	
Alfonso Carrillo de Mendoza y Morales (1913–1974)	9 February 1973	17 May 1974	1 year, 97 days	National Movement	Franco VIII	Francisco Franco (1939–1975)	
Alfonso Carrillo de Mendoza y Morales (1913–1974)	9 February 1973	17 May 1974	1 year, 97 days	National Movement	Luis Carrero Blanco†	Francisco Franco (1939–1975)	
Alfonso Carrillo de Mendoza y Morales (1913–1974)	9 February 1973	17 May 1974	1 year, 97 days	National Movement	The Duke of Fernández-Miranda (acting)	Francisco Franco (1939–1975)	
Alfonso Carrillo de Mendoza y Morales (1913–1974)	9 February 1973	17 May 1974	1 year, 97 days	National Movement	The Marquess of Arias Navarro	Francisco Franco (1939–1975)	
José Luis Gómez-Dégano y Ceballos-Zúñiga (1930–2024)	31 May 1974	17 October 1986	12 years, 139 days	National Movement	The Marquess of Arias Navarro	Francisco Franco (1939–1975)	
José Luis Gómez-Dégano y Ceballos-Zúñiga (1930–2024)	31 May 1974	17 October 1986	12 years, 139 days	National Movement	The Marquess of Arias Navarro	Juan Carlos I (1975–2014)	
José Luis Gómez-Dégano y Ceballos-Zúñiga (1930–2024)	31 May 1974	17 October 1986	12 years, 139 days	Independent	The Duke of Suárez	Juan Carlos I (1975–2014)	
José Luis Gómez-Dégano y Ceballos-Zúñiga (1930–2024)	31 May 1974	17 October 1986	12 years, 139 days	Independent	The Marquess of Ría de Ribadeo	Juan Carlos I (1975–2014)	
José Luis Gómez-Dégano y Ceballos-Zúñiga (1930–2024)	31 May 1974	17 October 1986	12 years, 139 days	Independent	Felipe González	Juan Carlos I (1975–2014)	
Fernando Valdés Dal-Ré (1945–2023)	17 October 1986	2 November 1990	4 years, 16 days	Independent	Felipe González	Juan Carlos I (1975–2014)	
Gonzalo Quintero Olivares (born 1947)	8 November 1990	18 September 1992	1 year, 315 days	Independent	Felipe González	Juan Carlos I (1975–2014)	
Emilio Jiménez Aparicio (born 1953)	2 October 1992	24 May 1996	3 years, 235 days	Independent	Felipe González	Juan Carlos I (1975–2014)	
José Javier Abad-Pérez Berenguer (1956–2003)	24 May 1996	12 May 2000	3 years, 354 days	Independent	José María Aznar	Juan Carlos I (1975–2014)	
Arturo García-Tizón López (born 1946)	12 May 2000	23 April 2004	3 years, 347 days	Popular	José María Aznar	Juan Carlos I (1975–2014)	
Joaquín Fuentes Bardají (born 1953)	23 April 2004	13 January 2012	7 years, 265 days	Socialist	José Luis Rodríguez Zapatero	Juan Carlos I (1975–2014)	
Marta Silva (born 1969)	13 January 2012	25 November 2016	4 years, 317 days	Independent	Mariano Rajoy	Juan Carlos I (1975–2014)	
Marta Silva (born 1969)	13 January 2012	25 November 2016	4 years, 317 days	Independent	Mariano Rajoy	Felipe VI (2014–present)	
Eugenio López Álvarez (born 1964)	25 November 2016	29 June 2018	1 year, 216 days	Independent	Mariano Rajoy	Felipe VI (2014–present)	
Consuelo Castro Rey (born 1964)	29 June 2018	18 June 2024	5 years, 355 days	Independent	Pedro Sánchez	Felipe VI (2014–present)	
David Vilas Álvarez (born 1973)	18 June 2024	Incumbent	2 years, 87 days	Independent	Pedro Sánchez	Felipe VI (2014–present)	
