= Third government of Francisco Franco =

1945–1951 government of Spain

3rd government of Francisco Franco
- Government of Spain
- 1945–1951
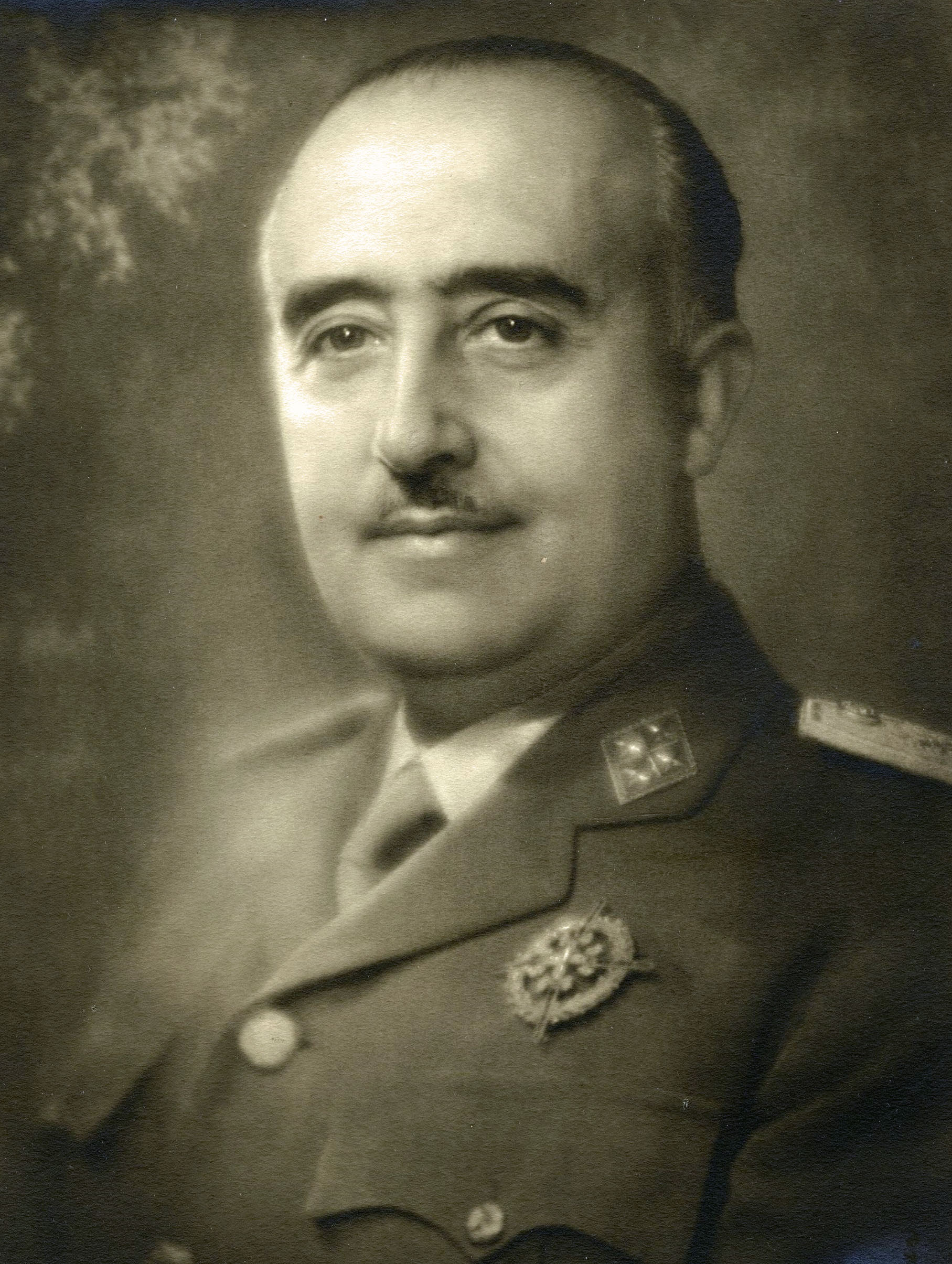
- Franco in 1950
- Date formed: 20 July 1945
- Date dissolved: 19 July 1951

People and organisations
- Head of State: Francisco Franco
- Prime Minister: Francisco Franco
- No. of ministers: 12 (Note: Does not include the prime minister.)
- Total no. of members: 12
- Member party: FET–JONS
- Status in legislature: One-party state

History
- Legislature terms: 1st Cortes Españolas; 2nd Cortes Españolas; 3rd Cortes Españolas
- Budget: 1946, 1947, 1948, 1949, 1950
- Predecessor: Franco II
- Successor: Franco IV

The third (Note: Sources differ on the numbering, depending on whether they consider every cabinet change or just major reshuffles as giving way to a different government. In this sense, the 1945–1951 period is regarded as both the third and the seventh government under Franco, depending on the source.) government of Francisco Franco was formed on 20 July 1945, following the end of World War II in Europe. It succeeded the second Franco government and was the government of Spain from 20 July 1945 to 19 July 1951, a total of 2,190 days, or 5 years, 11 months and 29 days.

Franco's third cabinet was made up of members from the different factions or "families" within the National Movement: mainly the FET y de las JONS party—the only legal political party during the Francoist regime—the military, the National Catholic Association of Propagandists (ACNP) and a number of aligned-nonpartisan figures from the civil service.

== Council of Ministers ==
The Council of Ministers was structured into the office for the prime minister and 12 ministries.

← Franco III Government → (20 July 1945 – 19 July 1951)
Portfolio	Name	Party	Took office	Left office	Ref.
Head of State; Prime Minister	Francisco Franco	Military	30 January 1938	9 June 1973	
Minister of Foreign Affairs	Alberto Martín-Artajo	ACNP	20 July 1945	25 February 1957	
Minister of the Army	Fidel Dávila Arrondo	Military	20 July 1945	19 July 1951	
Minister of the Navy	Francisco Regalado	Military	20 July 1945	19 July 1951	
Minister of the Air	Eduardo González-Gallarza	Military	20 July 1945	25 February 1957	
Minister of Justice	Raimundo Fernández-Cuesta	FET–JONS	20 July 1945	19 July 1951	
Minister of Finance	Joaquín Benjumea	FET–JONS	19 May 1941	19 July 1951	
Minister of Governance	Blas Pérez González	FET–JONS	3 September 1942	25 February 1957	
Minister of Industry and Trade	Juan Antonio Suanzes	FET–JONS	20 July 1945	19 July 1951	
Minister of Agriculture	Carlos Rein	FET–JONS	20 July 1945	19 July 1951	
Minister of National Education	José Ibáñez Martín	ACNP	9 August 1939	19 July 1951	
Minister of Labour	José Antonio Girón	FET–JONS	19 May 1941	25 February 1957	
Minister of Public Works	José María Fernández-Ladreda	Military	20 July 1945	19 July 1951	

== Departmental structure ==
Francisco Franco's third government was organised into several superior and governing units, whose number, powers and hierarchical structure varied depending on the ministerial department.

Unit/body rank

- (■) Undersecretary
- (■) Director-general
- (◆) Military & intelligence agency

Office (Original name)	Portrait	Name	Took office	Left office	Alliance/party	Ref.
=== Prime Minister's Office ===
Prime Minister (Presidencia del Gobierno)		Francisco Franco	30 January 1938	9 June 1973	FET–JONS (Military)	
Prime Minister (Presidencia del Gobierno)	–: (■) Directorate-General for the Geographic and Cadastral Institute; (■) Directorate-General for the National Institute of Statistics (est. 31 Dec 1945)					
=== Ministry of Foreign Affairs ===
Ministry of Foreign Affairs (Ministerio de Asuntos Exteriores)		Alberto Martín-Artajo	20 July 1945	25 February 1957	FET–JONS (ACNP)	
Ministry of Foreign Affairs (Ministerio de Asuntos Exteriores)	9 November 1944 – 31 December 1945: (■) Undersecretariat of Foreign Affairs; (■) Directorate-General for Foreign Policy; (■) Directorate-General for Economic Policy; (■) Directorate-General for General Affairs; (■) Directorate-General for America; (■) Introducer of Ambassadors; 31 December 1945 – 3 December 1954: (■) Undersecretariat of Foreign Affairs; (■) Directorate-General for Foreign Policy; (■) Directorate-General for Economic Policy; (■) Directorate-General for Cultural Relations; (■) Directorate-General for Internal Regime; (■) Directorate-General for Consular Affairs (est. 16 Jul 1949); (■) Service for Chancery, Protocol and Orders–Introducer of Ambassadors					
=== Ministry of the Army ===
Ministry of the Army (Ministerio del Ejército)		Fidel Dávila Arrondo	20 July 1945	19 July 1951	FET–JONS (Military)	
=== Ministry of the Navy ===
Ministry of the Navy (Ministerio de Marina)		Francisco Regalado	20 July 1945	19 July 1951	FET–JONS (Military)	
=== Ministry of the Air ===
Ministry of the Air (Ministerio del Aire)		Eduardo González-Gallarza	20 July 1945	25 February 1957	FET–JONS (Military)	
=== Ministry of Justice ===
Ministry of Justice (Ministerio de Justicia)		Raimundo Fernández-Cuesta	20 July 1945	19 July 1951	FET–JONS	
=== Ministry of Finance ===
Ministry of Finance (Ministerio de Hacienda)		Joaquín Benjumea	19 May 1941	19 July 1951	FET–JONS	
=== Ministry of Governance ===
Ministry of Governance (Ministerio de la Gobernación)		Blas Pérez González	3 September 1942	25 February 1957	FET–JONS	
=== Ministry of Industry and Trade ===
Ministry of Industry and Trade (Ministerio de Industria y Comercio)		Juan Antonio Suanzes	20 July 1945	19 July 1951	FET–JONS	
=== Ministry of Agriculture ===
Ministry of Agriculture (Ministerio de Agricultura)		Carlos Rein	20 July 1945	19 July 1951	FET–JONS	
=== Ministry of National Education ===
Ministry of National Education (Ministerio de Educación Nacional)		José Ibáñez Martín	9 August 1939	19 July 1951	FET–JONS (ACNP)	
=== Ministry of Labour ===
Ministry of Labour (Ministerio de Trabajo)		José Antonio Girón	19 May 1941	25 February 1957	FET–JONS	
=== Ministry of Public Works ===
Ministry of Public Works (Ministerio de Obras Públicas)		José María Fernández-Ladreda	20 July 1945	19 July 1951	FET–JONS (Military)	

== Bibliography ==
- Sánchez Recio, Glicerio (2013). "Familias políticas, estructuras de poder, instituciones del régimen". In Ruiz Carnicer, Miguel Ángel (ed.). Falange, las culturas políticas del fascismo en la España de Franco (1936-1975) (in Spanish). Vol. 1. Clarendon Press, University of Oxford. pp. 217–229. ISBN 978-84-9911-216-9.

Preceded by Franco II	Government of Spain; 1945–1951	Succeeded by Franco IV
