= Fernando María Castiella =

Spanish diplomat and politician

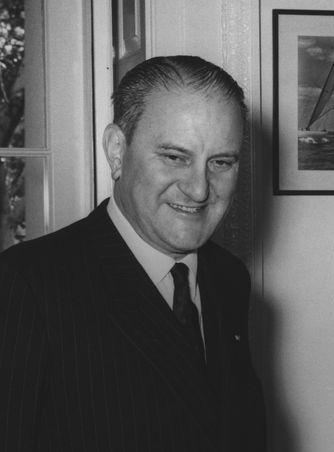

Minister of Foreign Affairs
- In office 25 February 1957 – 29 October 1969
- Preceded by: Alberto Martín-Artajo
- Succeeded by: Gregorio López-Bravo

Personal details
- Born: 9 December 1907 Bilbao, Spain
- Died: 25 November 1976 (aged 68) Madrid, Spain
- Party: FET y de las JONS; ACNP (National Movement)
- Occupation: Politician, diplomat, professor of Private International Law

Fernando María Castiella y Maíz (1907–1976) was a Spanish diplomat and politician, who served as Minister of Foreign Affairs (1957–1969) in Francoist Spain. He was a member of FET y de las JONS and the Catholic Association of Propagandists.

== Biography ==
Born in Bilbao on 9 December 1907.

He read Law and held a Doctorate from the University of Madrid. He also undertook postdoctoral specialisation at the Universities of Paris, Cambridge and Geneva and at The Hague Academy of International Law. He was appointed Catedrático of Public International Law at the University of Madrid in 1935. A Spanish Confederation of the Autonomous Right activist during the Second Republic, he often wrote in El Debate about international issues and was vice-president of the Catholic Students' Confederation.

When the Civil War started he fled from Madrid to the Nationalist zone, joining the Nationalist Army as official of the General Staff. During the Second World War he joined the Blue Division, a unit of Spanish volunteers that served in the Wehrmacht on the Eastern Front. With José María de Areilza, and wrote Reivindicaciones de España (Madrid: Instituto de Estudios Políticos, 1941), that drafted an expansionist programme over French African colonies. The book was written at the height of the Third Reich's power and Franco had considered entering war on Hitler's side.

He promoted the establishment of the Faculty of Political Science and Economics of the University of Madrid and he was the first dean. He was appointed ambassador to Peru (1948-1951) and to the Holy See (1951-1957), where he negotiated the Concordat of 1953.

Franco appointed him minister of Foreign Affairs on February 25, 1957. He set out to improve the relationship with the Western world. He tried with no success to become member of NATO and associate member of the European Common Market. He also tried to improve the terms of the defence and cooperation appointments with the United States but also with little success. He succeed, nevertheless, to be one of the co-founder countries of the Organisation for Economic Co-operation and Development (1961). Politically moderate aperturist, in 1961, he wrote a draft bill of religious freedom, although it was not passed until 1967. He tried vehemently to see the return of Gibraltar to Spanish sovereignty claiming the case was eligible for a decolonization process. He had for some decades ago written a book on Gibraltar on a such issue, but was nonetheless unsuccessful in his endeavours. After his tenure as minister, he taught Private International Law to Ph.D. students at the Complutense University in Madrid.

He died in Madrid on 25 November 1976.

== Works ==
Authored works

- Una batalla diplomática. Ed. Planeta. 1976.

Co-authored works

- Reivindicaciones de España. 1941.

== Bibliography ==
- Manuel Espadas: Franquismo y política exterior, Madrid: Rialp, 1988
- Javier Tusell; Juan Avilés, Rosa Pardo: La política exterior de España en el siglo XX, Madrid: Universidad Nacional de Educación a Distancia; Biblioteca Nueva, 2000
- Marcelino Oreja Aguirre; Rafael Sánchez Mantero: Entre la Historia y la Memoria, Fernando Maria Castiella y la Politica Exterior de España (1957-1969), written on the occasion of the centenary of his birth. Edited by the Royal Academy of Moral and Political Sciences, Madrid 2007.
- Sáez Alba, A. (1974). "Introducción a la ACNP". La otra cosa nostra. La Asociación Católica Nacional de Propagandistas y el caso de El Correo de Andalucía (in Spanish). Ruedo ibérico.
- Martín Puerta, Antonio (2015). "La Asociación Católica Nacional de Propagandistas durante la fase central del régimen de Franco". Hispania Sacra. 67 (135): 303–338. doi:10.3989/hs.2015.009. ISSN 0018-215X.
- Barreiro, Cristina (2018). "La ACNdeP y su papel político en el primer franquismo". Hispania Sacra. 70 (142): 681–689. doi:10.3989/hs.2018.047. ISSN 0018-215X. Archived from the original on 31 December 2018.

Party political offices
Preceded by Felipe Ximénez de Sandoval	National Delegate of the Servicio Exterior de Falange; 1942–1943	Succeeded by Antonio Riestra del Moral
Academic offices
Preceded by Antonio Riestra del Moral	Director of the Institute of Political Studies; 1943–1948	Succeeded by Francisco Javier Conde
Diplomatic posts
Preceded by	Ambassador to Peru; 1948–1951	Succeeded by
Preceded by Joaquín Ruiz-Giménez	Ambassador to the Holy See; 1951–1957	Succeeded by Francisco Gómez de Llano
Political offices
Preceded by Alberto Martín-Artajo	Minister of Foreign Affairs; 1957–1969	Succeeded by Gregorio López-Bravo
Academic offices
Preceded by José de Yanguas Messía	Member of the Royal Academy of Moral and Political Sciences (Medal #20); 1976	Succeeded by Juan Velarde Fuertes
