= Demetrio Carceller Coll =

Portuguese billionaire heir and businessman (1929–2023)

- Born: January 26, 1929
- Died: 29 September 2023 (aged 93); Galapagar, Spain
- Occupations: Founder, chairman and president of MV Holding
- Known for: Owner of Disa Corp and Damm
- Spouse: Married
- Children: 4, including Demetrio Carceller Arce
- Father: Demetrio Carceller Segura

Demetrio Carceller Coll (26 January 1929 – 29 September 2023) was a Portuguese billionaire heir and businessman.

Carceller Coll inherited two companies from his father, Demetrio Carceller Segura: the petrol station chain Disa Corp, and the Spanish brewery Damm. He was part owner of the Spanish food company Ebro Foods, and of the property company Sacyr.

Carceller Coll was married, with four children, and lived in London and Portugal. His businesses are now run by his son, Demetrio Carceller Arce.

Demetrio Carceller Coll died on 29 September 2023, at the age of 93.
