= Castle of Velasco =

Castle in Valle de Mena, Spain

Coordinates: 43°04′59″N 3°20′29″W

- Lezana de Mena, Burgos, Spain
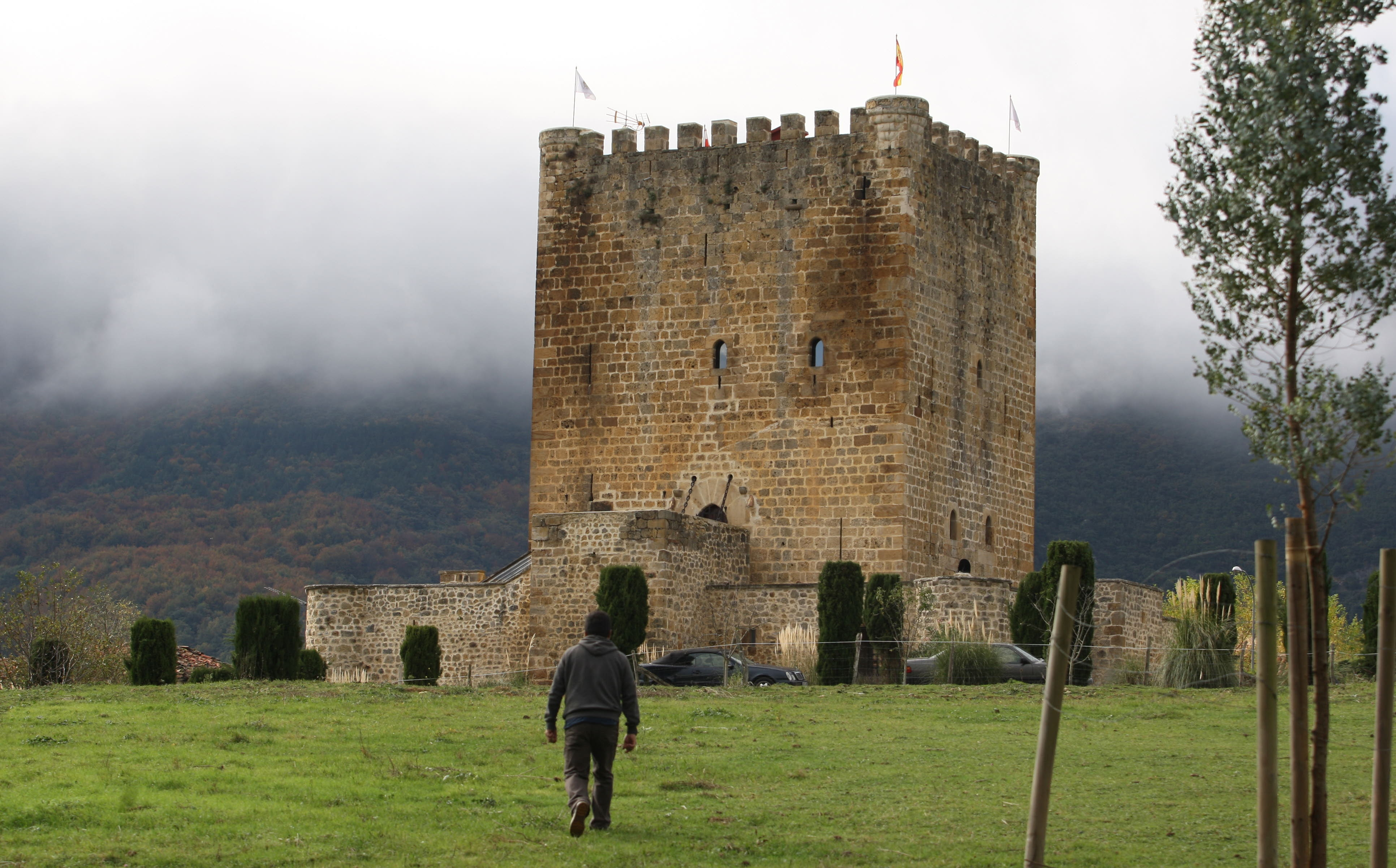

Site information
- Type: Castle
- Controlled by: Private owner
- Condition: Cultural site

Site history
- Built: 14th century
- Materials: Stone

The Castle of Velasco (Spanish: Castillo de los Velasco) is a 14th-century castle in Valle de Mena, Burgos, Spain. The medieval castle has been restored and is privately owned. The Spanish government classifies the fortification as a site of cultural interest.

== Description ==
The Castle of the Velasco is located in the town of Lezana de Mena, which belongs to the municipality of Valle de Mena, in the autonomous community of Castilla y León.

It was generically protected along with the rest of the castles in Spain on April 22, 1949, through a decree signed by the dictator Francisco Franco and the then Minister of Education, José Ibáñez Martín, published on May 5 of that same year in the Boletín Oficial del Estado.
