= Marta Silva =

Marta Silva de Lapuerta
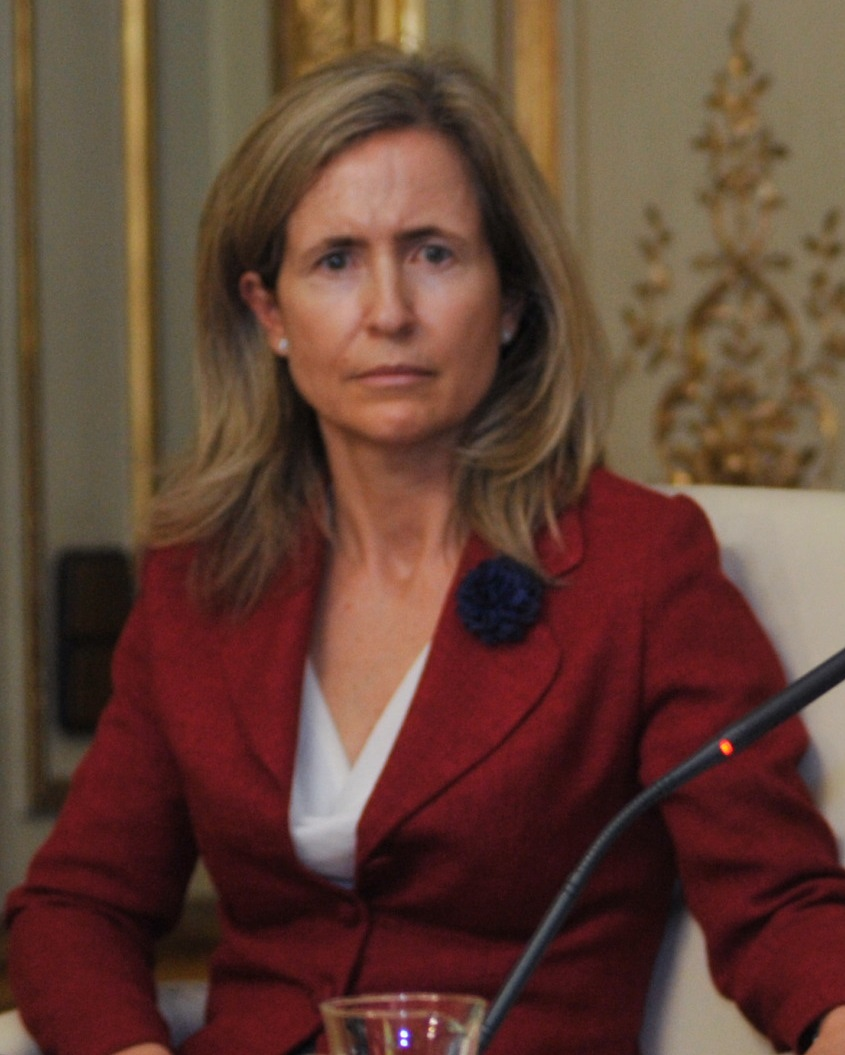

Solicitor General of Spain
- In office 13 January 2012 – 25 November 2016
- Preceded by: Joaquín Fuentes Bardají
- Succeeded by: Eugenio López Álvarez

Personal details
- Born: 15 February 1969 (age 57) Madrid, Spain
- Education: Universidad CEU San Pablo
- Occupation: Jurist
- Awards: Grand Cross of the Order of Saint Raymond of Peñafort (2013)

Marta Silva de Lapuerta (born 15 February 1969) is a Spanish jurist. A member of the State Lawyers Corps since 1996, she was the Solicitor General of Spain from 2012 to 2016, the first woman to hold the office. She also served on the boards of Real Madrid CF and Sacyr.

== Biography ==
Silva was born in Madrid. Her father Federico Silva Muñoz (1923–1997) was also a member of the State Lawyers Corps, and the Minister of Public Works from 1965 to 1970 during the dictatorship of Francisco Franco. She was the youngest of nine children, including Rosario Silva de Lapuerta (born 1954), who in 1978 became the first woman member of the State Lawyers Corps, and later served on the European Court of Justice. On her maternal side, her uncle Álvaro Lapuerta (1927–2018) was another member of the same body, and the treasurer of the People's Party (PP) from 1993 to 2008; her grandfather José María de Lapuerta (1897–1968) was also a state lawyer.

Silva graduated with a law degree from the Universidad CEU San Pablo in Madrid. She was admitted to the State Lawyers Corps in 1996. She was on the board of directors at Real Madrid CF during the first presidency of Florentino Pérez (2000–2006), serving as secretary general. Also on the board was Luis del Rivero, president of the construction company Sacyr, who appointed her onto its board.

In January 2012, the Minister of Justice, Alberto Ruiz-Gallardón, appointed Silva as Solicitor General of Spain. She was the first woman to hold the office. In November 2015, she filed the state's appeal against a motion passed by the Parliament of Catalonia to begin the process of independence. She was replaced by Eugenio López Álvarez in November 2016.

Silva received the Grand Cross of the Order of Saint Raymond of Peñafort, a state award for services to law and justice, in 2013.
