= Francisco de Cárdenas Espejo =

Spanish lawyer, journalist and politician

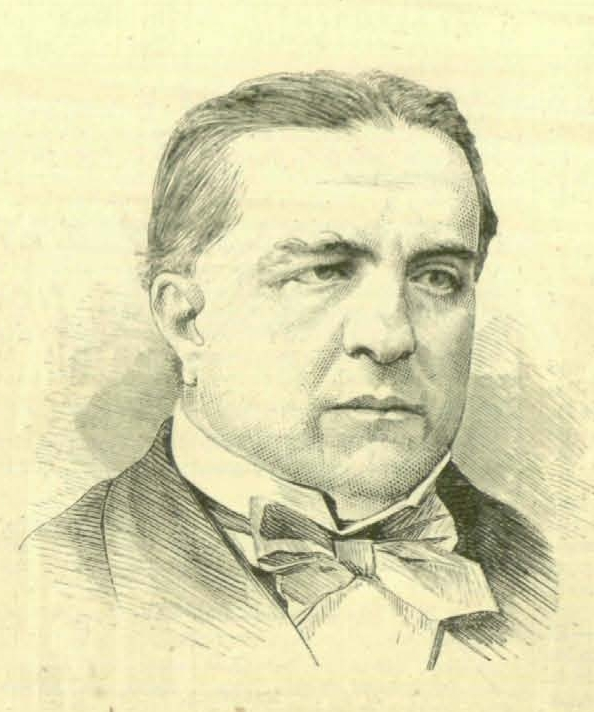
Francisco de Cárdenas; from La Ilustración Española y Americana (1875)

Francisco de Cárdenas Espejo (4 February 1817, Seville - 3 July 1898, Madrid) was a Spanish lawyer, journalist and politician who served as Minister of Justice under King Alfonso XII. Previously he served as 5th Solicitor General of Spain.

== Biography ==
After studying law in his home town, in 1839 he became Professor of Moral Philosophy, Logic and Grammar at the University of Seville. In 1853, he was elected a Deputy for the Province of Zaragoza and, in 1864, was named a Senator for life.

Following the Revolution of 1868, he retired from politics and did not return to elected office until after the Bourbon Restoration when he was chosen as a Senator for the Province of Córdoba and reaffirmed as a Senator for life in 1877. He served as Minister of Justice from 1874 to 1875 during the government of Antonio Cánovas and abolished numerous laws that had been enacted during the Sexenio Democrático.

He founded several conservative periodicals between 1839 and 1847. He also served as the Spanish Ambassador to France and the Holy See. In addition, he was a member of the Real Academia de la Historia and the Real Academia de Ciencias Morales y Políticas; of which he also served as President.

== Selected works ==
- Ensayo sobre la historia de la propíedad territorial en España, J.Noguera, 1873 Digitalized online @ the HathiTrust
- Estudios jurídicos, P. Nuñez, 1884
- De los vicios y defectos más notables de la legislación civil de España, y de las reformas que para subsanarlas se proponen en el proyecto de código civil, R. Rodríguez de Rivera, 1852
- De la influencia del teatro en las costumbres y la protección que puede dispensarle el Estado: Informe de la Real Academia de Ciencias Morales y Políticas, E. Martínez, 1880 Digitalized online @ the HathiTrust
