= Francisco Gómez de Llano =

Spanish politician and diplomat

Francisco Gómez de Llano (1896–1970) was a Spanish politician and diplomat. In Francoist Spain, he served as Minister of Finance (1951–1957) and as Ambassador to the Holy See (1957–1962).

== Biography ==
Born on 22 October 1896 in Madrid. After earning a Licentiate degree in Law at the University of Madrid, he joined the elite State Lawyers Corps. He served as official during the dictatorship of Primo de Rivera. He was a member of the Asociación Católica Nacional de Propagandistas (A.C.N. de P.).

In Francoist Spain, from July 1951 to February 1957, he served as Minister of Finance, espousing the paradigm of restraint of public spending in order to balance public budget. With a political profile described as one of a "technocrat" and not substantially involved with Falangism, Gómez de Llano sometimes clashed with his Falangist peers at the Council of Ministers. Appointed as Ambassador to the Holy See in 1957, he served in the diplomatic mission in the Vatican until 1962, when he was replaced by José María Doussinague. Later in his life, he served as Chairman of the Banco Hipotecario de España (BHE).

He died in Madrid on 31 October 1970.

== Decorations ==
- Grand Cross of the Order of Isabella the Catholic (1954)
- Grand Cross of the Order of the Agricultural Merit (1955)
- Gold Medal to Merit in the Insurance (1955)
- Grand Cross of the Order of St. Raymond of Peñafort (1957)
- Grand Cross of the Order of Charles III (1957)
- Grand Cross of the Order of Naval Merit (1957)

Political offices
Preceded by Joaquín Benjumea Burín	Minister of Finance; 1951–1957	Succeeded by Mariano Navarro Rubio
Diplomatic posts
Preceded by Fernando María Castiella	Ambassador to the Holy See; 1957–1962	Succeeded by José María Doussinague
Business positions
Preceded by	Chairman of the Banco Hipotecario de España; 1962–1968	Succeeded by
