= Juan Velarde (economist) =

Spanish economist (1927–2023)

Juan Velarde Fuertes (26 June 1927 – 3 February 2023) was a Spanish economist. He was serving as President of the Royal Academy of Moral and Political Sciences.

== Early life and education ==
Juan was born in the Asturian town of Salas on June 26, 1927. (of which he was named Favorite Son). After studying at the Ramiro de Maeztu Institute, he graduated and received his doctorate with an Extraordinary Prize in Economic Sciences at the University of Madrid, with the first promotion of these studies in Spain (1956).

== Career ==
In 1951, Fuertes entered the national body of labor inspection. He worked as the Directorate of the Institute of Labor Studies and Social Security until 1982. Throughout his life he wrote about economic issues in different media and publications, such as the Revista de Economía Política, La Hora, Alférez and Alcalá. Between 1952 and 1979 he directed the economic section of the newspaper Arriba.

From 1979 to 1986 he contributed a column in the newspaper Ya. From 1986 he collaborated regularly in the newspaper ABC. He collaborated with the current affairs magazine Época; for years published articles in articles in Expansión and a weekly Tribuna in El Economista

== Works ==
- 'Cien años de la economía española' por Ediciones Encuentro ('One hundred years of Spanish economy' by Ediciones Encuentro) 2009
