= José Lorente Sanz =

Spanish politician

Minister of Governance of Spain
- Acting
- In office 16 October 1940 – 5 May 1941
- Prime Minister: Francisco Franco
- Preceded by: Ramón Serrano Suñer
- Succeeded by: Valentín Galarza

Personal details
- Born: 1902
- Died: 2001 (aged 98–99)
- Party: FET y de las JONS (National Movement)

José Luis Lorente Sanz (1902 – 2001) was a Spanish politician who served as acting Minister of Governance of Spain replacing outgoing minister Ramón Serrano Suñer between 1940 and 1941, during the Francoist dictatorship.
