= Alberto Martín-Artajo =

Spanish politician (1905–1979)

Minister of Foreign Affairs of Spain
- In office 20 July 1945 – 25 February 1957
- Prime Minister: Francisco Franco
- Preceded by: José Félix de Lequerica
- Succeeded by: Fernando María Castiella

Personal details
- Born: Alberto Martín-Artajo y Álvarez; 2 October 1905 Madrid, Spain
- Died: 31 August 1979 (aged 73) Madrid, Spain
- Party: ACNP (National Movement)

Alberto Martín-Artajo Álvarez (2 October 1905, in Madrid – 31 August 1979, in Madrid) was a legal technocrat for the Nationalist government during the Spanish Civil War and for the succeeding reign of caudillo Francisco Franco, and a Spanish Minister of Foreign Affairs. He served as the Foreign Minister from 1945 to 1957. Ideologically, he was not a Falangist (a member of the original Falange Española, the fascist-like party, before it absorbed the other anti-Republican parties), but a monarchist and a leader of the dynamic and powerful Catholic movement within the Francoist coalition. During the time of the Second Spanish Republic, he had been a member of the Spanish Confederation of the Autonomous Right (CEDA, existed 1933–1937).

He received his secondary education at Our Lady of Remembrance College, Madrid. Martín-Artajo earned a law degree from the University of Madrid. He became a staff attorney of the Council of State in 1931. During the Republic, Martín-Artajo worked closely with Ángel Herrera Oria, the director of the Catholic newspaper El Debate and belonged to the lay National Catholic Association of Propagandists (propagandistas). With the start of the Spanish Civil War, Martín-Artajo went over to the insurgent Nationalists. He was a legal adviser to the Nationalist government's Junta Técnica del Estado (State Technical Council), Franco's cabinet, (Note: At the beginning of the Civil War (July 1936), the insurgents created the Junta de Defensa Nacional (National Defense Council) to carry out the function of the Council of Ministers, the Spanish cabinet. The JDN was replaced by the Junta Técnica del Estado (State Technical Council) on 1 October 1936. Finally, a cabinet composed of ordinary ministerial departments was created by a law of 30 January 1938.) and to the Nationalist government's Labor Ministry. In 1940, Generalissimo Franco appointed him president of the mass movement, Catholic Action.

In 1945, Martín-Artajo participated in the drafting of the quasiconstitutional "Fuero of the Spanish People", a list of rights, freedoms, and responsibilities.

In July 1945, fresh after the defeat of the Third Reich, Franco wanted to present the Spanish government as "Catholic" rather than a profascist, in the face of ostracism from other Western countries. Franco wanted to appoint Martín-Artajo Minister of Foreign Affairs. After consulting with the Primate of Spain, Cardinal Enrique Pla y Deniel, he accepted the portfolio of Foreign Affairs and resigned from his position at Catholic Action. His diplomatic efforts succeeded in breaking Spain's isolation. On 8 March 1953, Martìn-Artajo received the Ancient Order of Sikatuna for his "exceptional and meritorious services to the Republic of the Philippines", becoming the first person to be given the honor after its creation. He effectuated the signing of the Concordat with the Holy See in August 1953, the bilateral Pact of Madrid with the United States the following September, and Spain's entry into the United Nations in 1955.

After retiring from the Foreign Ministry, he worked on the Council of State and at the publisher, Editorial Católica.

== Sources ==
- Calvo-González, Oscar (10 September 2007). "American Military Interests and Economic Confidence in Spain under the Franco Dictatorship". The Journal of Economic History. 67 (3): 740–767. doi:10.1017/S0022050707000290. S2CID 154438737.
- "Ha fallecido Alberto Martín Artajo". El País (in Spanish). 31 August 1979.
- Jerez, Miguel (1992). "Business and Politics in Spain: From Francoism to Democracy". Archived from the original on 13 February 2012.
- Linz, Juan J.; Jerez, Miguel; Corzo, Susana. "Ministers and Regimes in Spain: From First to Second Restoration, 1874-2001. Center for European Studies Working Paper No. 101" (PDF). Archived from the original (PDF) on 1 July 2010.
- "Franco's Voice Abroad; Alberto Martin Artajo Early Catholic Leader". The New York Times. 10 April 1956.
- Palomares, Cristina (2005). The quest for survival after Franco: moderate Francoism and the slow journey to the polls, 1964-1977. Brighton: Sussex Academic Press.
- Portero, Florentino [in Spanish] (2007). "El legado Castiella". ABC (in Spanish). Madrid.
- Preston, Paul (1995). The Politics of Revenge: Fascism and the Military in Twentieth-century Spain. Routledge.
- Sáez Alba, A. (1974). "Introducción a la ACNP". La otra cosa nostra. La Asociación Católica Nacional de Propagandistas y el caso de El Correo de Andalucía (in Spanish). Ruedo ibérico.
- Martín Puerta, Antonio (2015). "La Asociación Católica Nacional de Propagandistas durante la fase central del régimen de Franco". Hispania Sacra. 67 (135): 303–338. doi:10.3989/hs.2015.009. ISSN 0018-215X.
- Barreiro, Cristina (2018). "La ACNdeP y su papel político en el primer franquismo". Hispania Sacra. 70 (142): 681–689. doi:10.3989/hs.2018.047. ISSN 0018-215X. Archived from the original on 31 December 2018.
