= José Larraz López =

Spanish politician

Minister of Finance of Spain
- In office 9 August 1939 – 19 May 1941
- Prime Minister: Francisco Franco
- Preceded by: Andrés Amado Reygondaud
- Succeeded by: Joaquín Benjumea

Personal details
- Born: José Larraz López; 27 April 1904 Cariñena, Kingdom of Spain
- Died: 17 November 1973 (aged 69) Madrid, Spanish State
- Party: ACNP (National Movement)

José Larraz López (Cariñena, 27 April 1904 – Madrid, 17 November 1973) was a Spanish politician who served as Minister of Finance of Spain between 1939 and 1941, during the Francoist dictatorship. He was a member of the Catholic Association of Propagandists.

== Bibliography ==
- Sáez Alba, A. (1974). "Introducción a la ACNP". La otra cosa nostra. La Asociación Católica Nacional de Propagandistas y el caso de El Correo de Andalucía (in Spanish). Ruedo ibérico.
- Martín Puerta, Antonio (2015). "La Asociación Católica Nacional de Propagandistas durante la fase central del régimen de Franco". Hispania Sacra. 67 (135): 303–338. doi:10.3989/hs.2015.009. ISSN 0018-215X.
- Barreiro, Cristina (2018). "La ACNdeP y su papel político en el primer franquismo". Hispania Sacra. 70 (142): 681–689. doi:10.3989/hs.2018.047. ISSN 0018-215X. Archived from the original on 31 December 2018.
