= Joaquín Benjumea =

Spanish politician (1878–1963)

Minister of Finance of Spain
- In office 19 May 1941 – 19 July 1951
- Prime Minister: Francisco Franco
- Preceded by: José Larraz López
- Succeeded by: Francisco Gómez de Llano

Minister of Agriculture of Spain
- In office 9 August 1939 – 19 May 1941
- Prime Minister: Francisco Franco
- Preceded by: Raimundo Fernández-Cuesta
- Succeeded by: Miguel Primo de Rivera y Sáenz de Heredia

Minister of Labour of Spain
- Interim
- In office 9 August 1939 – 19 May 1941
- Prime Minister: Francisco Franco
- Preceded by: Pedro González Bueno (Trade Union Organization and Action)
- Succeeded by: José Antonio Girón

Personal details
- Born: Joaquín Benjumea y Burín; 17 January 1878 Seville, Spain
- Died: 30 December 1963 (aged 85) Seville, Spain
- Party: FET y de las JONS

Joaquín Benjumea y Burín, 1st Count of Benjumea (17 January 1878 – 30 December 1963) was a Spanish politician who served as Minister of Agriculture and acting Minister of Labour of Spain between 1939 and 1941 and as Minister of Finance between 1941 and 1951, during the Francoist dictatorship. He was a member of FET y de las JONS.
