= José María Fernández-Ladreda =

Spanish general

José María Fernández Ladreda
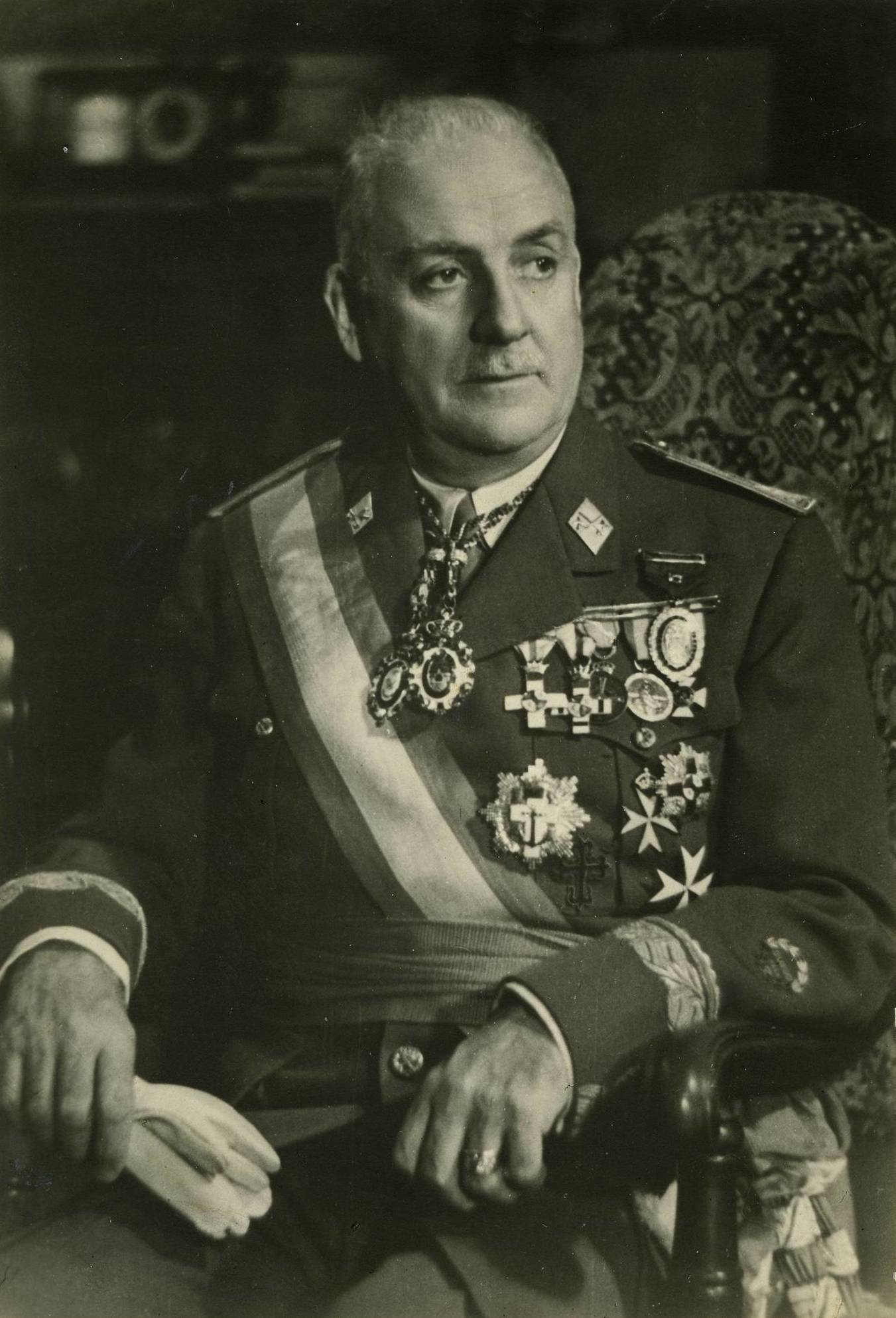

Minister of Public Works of Spain
- In office 20 July 1945 – 19 July 1951
- Prime Minister: Francisco Franco
- Preceded by: Alfonso Peña Boeuf
- Succeeded by: Fernando Suárez de Tangil

Personal details
- Born: José María Fernández-Ladreda y Menéndez-Valdés; 14 March 1885 Oviedo, Kingdom of Spain
- Died: 20 September 1954 (aged 69) Siero, Spanish State

Military service
- Branch/service: Spanish Armed Forces
- Years of service: 1903–1954

José María Fernández-Ladreda y Menéndez-Valdés, Count of San Pedro (14 March 1885 – 20 September 1954) was a Spanish general who served as Minister of Public Works of Spain between 1945 and 1951, during the Francoist dictatorship.
