= Pedro Gamero del Castillo =

Spanish politician

- Born: Pedro Gamero del Castillo; November 20, 1910; Seville
- Died: December 9, 1984 (aged 74); Madrid
- Education: University of Seville
- Occupation: Businessman
- Known for: Politician
- Political party: FET y de las JONS; ACNP (National Movement)

Pedro Gamero del Castillo (20 November 1910, in Seville – 9 December 1984, in Madrid) was a Spanish politician and figure in the Spanish Civil War. He was a member of FET y de las JONS and the Catholic Association of Propagandists.

== Early years ==
Gamero first entered politics whilst attending the University of Seville where he was leader of the student movement. Initially a member of the monarchist Acción Española he joined the Falange in July 1936 and was soon appointed Civil Governor of Seville. He was involved in talks with Carlists leaders in Lisbon in 1937 over merging with the Falange but the contacts failed because of his endorsement of Don Juan de Borbon as rightful heir to the throne of Spain, although subsequently Franco merged the two movements by decree. Following the establishment of the Falange Española Tradicionalista y de las Juntas de Ofensiva Nacional-Sindicalista later that same year Gamero was appointed to its Junta Politica, confirming his status as the rising star of the movement. In the final days of the civil war he served with the Spanish Navy.

== Government role ==
After the civil war Gamero was taken under the wing of Ramón Serrano Súñer and became his protégé. In 1939 he became the youngest minister in Franco's post-war government, serving as Minister without Portfolio and vice-general secretary of the Movement from 1939. He was even acting General Secretary for a spell in 1940. However Gamero was no Francisco Franco loyalist and his ambitions for Serrano Súñer led to problems for him. He consulted in January 1941 with Hans Lazar, the press secretary of the German Embassy and told him that a Serrano Súñer government would commit to the Axis powers and thus asked for him to arrange for the Nazis to publicly back his mentor. Nevertheless, Gamero was a committed Catholic, who beneath a pro-German exterior was alienated by what he saw as the godless nature of the Nazi vision, and offered discreet support to British efforts to keep Spain out of the war through contacts at the British embassy in Madrid. After growing differences with Franco, Gamero became the first minister to offer his resignation in public in March 1941. However, Franco did not accept the resignation until May as part of a cabinet reshuffle. In July 1943, Gamero, along with various members of the Cortes and several senior army officers, called upon Franco to prepare for the post-Second World War era by restoring the monarchy under Don Juan. Fearing the growing influence of Nazi agents Franco acted and in May 1941 Gamero was deprived of his position, along with a number of pro-Nazis such as Dionisio Ridruejo and Sancho Dávila y Fernández de Celis. Increasingly becoming noted for cronyism and financial corruption, Gamero was finally removed from his seat on the Council of State in 1943 after publicly calling for the restoration of the monarchy. He remained a member of the Consejo de Estado, the Council of State, having gained admission through academic merit as a jurist.

== Later years ==
Deprived of his government office Gamero was part of a 1944 monarchist plot to overthrow Franco. whilst he was also closely involved in the machinations of monarchist General Alfredo Kindelán. By then Gamero was convinced the future of Spain lay in a constitutional monarchy. From 1946 onwards he worked on ideas for a new constitution and became part of the council of wise man advising Don Juan living in exile at Estoril in Portugal. Devoting himself to business, he was on the board or helping to run a number of major Spanish companies covering banking,(vice-president of Banco Hispano-Americano, property (Vallehermoso) and shipbuilding (Astilleros Espanoles), and latterly became a founding shareholder in El País, the new newspaper that played a fundamental role in the transition to democracy.

== Bibliography ==
- Sáez Alba, A. (1974). "Introducción a la ACNP". La otra cosa nostra. La Asociación Católica Nacional de Propagandistas y el caso de El Correo de Andalucía (in Spanish). Ruedo ibérico.
- Martín Puerta, Antonio (2015). "La Asociación Católica Nacional de Propagandistas durante la fase central del régimen de Franco". Hispania Sacra. 67 (135): 303–338. doi:10.3989/hs.2015.009. ISSN 0018-215X.
- Barreiro, Cristina (2018). "La ACNdeP y su papel político en el primer franquismo". Hispania Sacra. 70 (142): 681–689. doi:10.3989/hs.2018.047. ISSN 0018-215X. Archived from the original on 31 December 2018.
