= Royal Academy of Moral and Political Sciences =

Academy of social sciences in Spain

Coordinates: 40.4152°N 3.7102°W

- Real Academia de Ciencias Morales y Políticas
- Arms of the Royal Academy of Moral and Political Sciences
- Abbreviation: RACMYP
- Formation: 30 September 1857; 168 years ago
- Type: learned society
- Location: Madrid, Spain
- Region served: Spain
- Protector: Felipe VI (as King of Spain)
- President: Benigno Pendás García (since 2021)
- Parent organization: Institute of Spain
- Website: www.racmyp.es

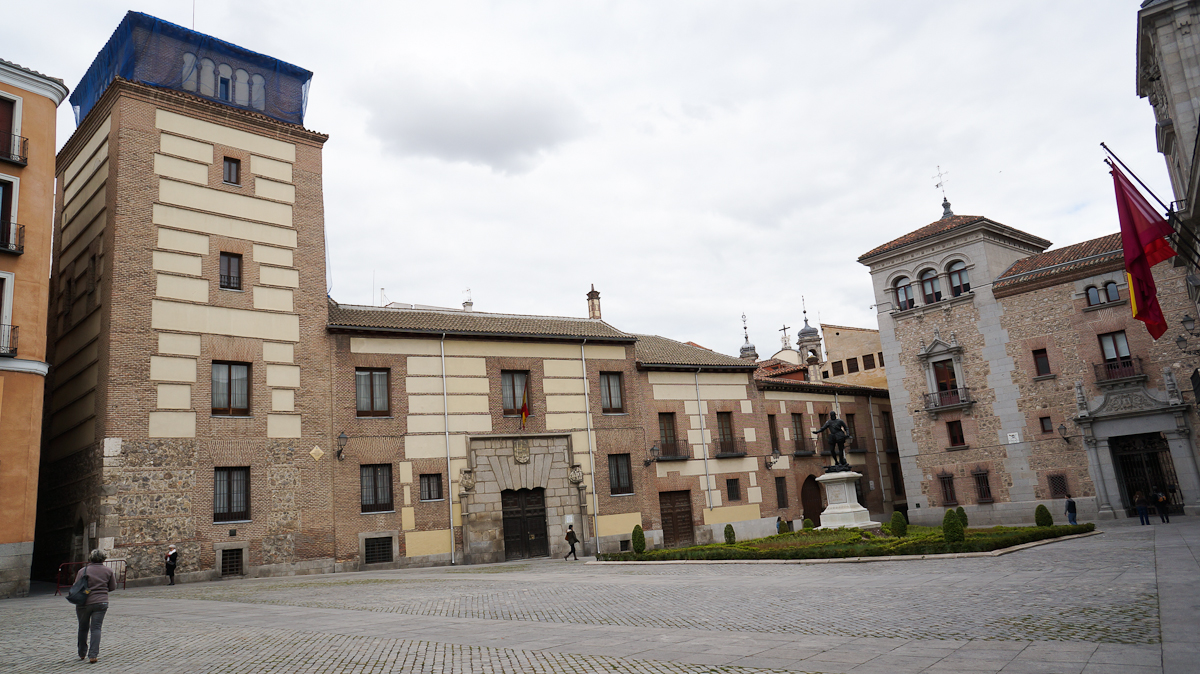
Headquarters of the Royal Academy in the Plaza de la Villa, Madrid

The Royal Academy of Moral and Political Sciences (Spanish: Real Academia de Ciencias Morales y Políticas, RACMP) is a Spanish institution in Madrid that studies and discuss issues related to social, economic, philosophical, political and juridical knowledge. It was created on 30 September 1857, by Royal Decree of Queen Isabella II.

The Academy provides a place for debate on ideas and major questions facing our society; serving as a center for the diffusion of knowledge and an investigative laboratory. Its work is based on the cumulative knowledge of its Academicians; significant personalities from the fields of politics, economics and social sciences of the last century and a half.

The objective was to establish a counterpart to the Royal Academy of History. In pursuit of that goal, its first members included progressive thinkers such as Salustiano Olózaga in addition to more moderate figures, which included Juan Bravo Murillo and Modesto Lafuente.

The Directorate of the Academy is composed of a President and five other members who serve in executive functions and ensure compliance with statutes and regulations. The Academy itself is divided into four sections: Ciencias Filosóficas, Ciencias Políticas y jurídicas, Ciencias Sociales and Ciencias Económicas.

The headquarters of the Academy are located in the Casa y Torre de los Lujanes, the oldest public building in Madrid, where weekly plenary sessions are held for debates. Lectures, presentations and assorted events are also provided for the public. The library, which contains over 140,000 volumes, is open to researchers from around the world.

Among those who have been members of the Academy are politicians and jurists such as Francisco Martínez de la Rosa, Antonio Alcalá Galiano, Antonio Cánovas del Castillo, Julián Besteiro and Faustino Rodríguez-San Pedro y Díaz-Argüelles. Notable members who were specialists in various fields of the social sciences include Antonio Cavanilles, Marcelino Menéndez y Pelayo, Joaquín Ruiz-Giménez and Salvador de Madariaga.

== Presidents of the Academy ==
- Pedro José Pidal y Carniado
- Lorenzo Arrazola y García
- Florencio Rodríguez Vaamonde
- Manuel García Barzanallana
- Francisco de Cárdenas Espejo
- Laureano Figuerola y Ballester
- Antonio Aguilar y Correa
- Alejandro Groizard y Gómez de la Serna
- Joaquín Sánchez de Toca y Calvo
- Antonio Goicoechea Cosculluela
- José Gascón y Marín
- José María de Yanguas Messía
- Alfonso García Valdecasas
- Luis Díez del Corral y Pedruzo
- Enrique Fuentes Quintana
- Sabino Fernández Campo
- Marcelino Oreja Aguirre
- Juan Velarde Fuertes
- Miguel Herrero y Rodríguez de Miñón
- Benigno Pendás García (current)
