= Solicitor General of Spain =

Spanish government chief lawyer

Solicitor General of the State
- Abogado General del Estado
- Coat of Arms of the Spanish Legal Service

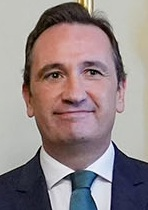
- Incumbent; David Vilas Álcarez since 18 June 2024
- Ministry of Justice; Office of the Solicitor General
- Style: The Most Illustrious (formal); Mr./Mrs. Solicitor General (informal)
- Member of: Council of State; General Commission of Secretaries of State and Undersecretaries
- Nominator: The Minister of Justice after hearing the Council of Ministers
- Appointer: The Monarch
- Term length: No fixed term
- Constituting instrument: Law 52/1997, of 27 November, on Legal Assistance to the State and Public Institutions.
- Precursor: Advisor to the General Superintendency of Finance (1786–1849)
- Formation: 28 December 1849; 176 years ago
- First holder: Ventura González Romero
- Deputy: Director-General for Advisory Services
- Website: Office of the Solicitor General of Spain

The Solicitor General of the State (Spanish: Abogado General del Estado) is the Spanish government chief lawyer and, as such, is the head of the Spanish Legal Service, the agency responsible for giving legal advice to central government, its agencies, and all State institutions or other public administration within its jurisdiction, as well as representing them before the courts of justice.

The solicitor general, with the administrative rank of under-secretary, is also the head of the State Lawyers Corps, the civil servants who have constituted the legal service since 1881.

Originally established in the 19th century within the Ministry of Finance, the position evolved from providing advice and representation to the Public Treasury to offering these same services to the entire government apparatus. Today, the Office of the Solicitor General is part of the Ministry of Justice and its head is appointed by the Monarch, on the advice of the minister of justice, among the active State lawyers.

== Solicitor General's Office ==
The Office of the Solicitor General (Spanish: Abogacía General del Estado) is a department of the Ministry of Justice which assumes the direction of the State Legal Service; in such concept, corresponds to it the direction, coordination and inspection of the services entrusted to State attorneys, ensuring in all cases the maintenance of the principle of unity of doctrine in the exercise of the powers attributed to them.

The Solicitor General's Office is assisted by a Technical Cabinet, two directorates-general, four deputy director-generals, and the different offices of the State Solicitor's before courts and other bodies, namely:

- The Solicitor General's Technical Cabinet, which is responsible for supporting the solicitor general.
- The Directorate-General for Advisory Services, which is responsible for the legal advice of the General State Administration and its different agencies, including State-owned companies, as well as giving legal advice to the autonomous communities and local administrations.
- The Directorate-General for Litigation, which is responsible for the representation and defense of the State and its autonomous agencies, as well as other public bodies and entities; state-owned companies and foundations with state participation; autonomous communities, local administrations and the constitutional bodies before any jurisdictions and jurisdictional organs, to the conflicts of jurisdiction and conflicts and questions of competence and to the preliminary and extrajudicial procedures in which the State is interested. It also corresponds to give legal advice on claims prior to the civil and labor court, in cases in which the opinion of the deputy general directorate is requested, and of the files for the payment of costs to be condemned by the State when it arises controversy. Likewise, it is responsible for ensuring the effectiveness of the principle of unity of doctrine in the scope of litigation, formulating general criteria for action in the trial for State attorneys.
- The Deputy Directorate for Human and Material Resources of the Solicitor General's Office, which assists the solicitor general regarding the internal policies of human and material resources, as well as those related to economic and budgetary affairs.
- The Deputy Directorate-General for Constitutional and Human Rights, which is responsible for the representation and defense of the State and its autonomous agencies as well as other bodies of the State in trial before the Constitutional Court. In the same way, it will develop the advice on procedural or substantive issues derived from the approach or processing of constitutional procedures; as well as, in particular, the advice, when requested by the Government or any of its members, on the constitutionality of the draft bills of any rank that have to be submitted for approval, and the legal examination and report, to petition of the Government or of any of its members, of the dispositions or resolutions of the autonomous communities that may be challenged before the Constitutional Court. Its also in charge of the representation of Spain before the European Court of Human Rights and the legal advice about European Convention on Human Rights issues and the legal advice about any other international treaty about human rights signed by Spain.
- The Deputy Directorate-General for European Union and International Affairs, which is responsible for the representation and defense of the Kingdom of Spain before the judicial bodies of the European Union and before the International Criminal Court. It also has competences, in coordination with the Ministry of Foreign Affairs, in legal assistance in the infringement proceedings opened by the European Commission against Spain. It also offers legal assistance in the field of European Union law.
- The Deputy Directorate-General for Internal Audit and Knowledge Management, which is responsible for the coordination of relations between State Solicitors Offices that perform advisory functions and State Solicitors Offices that perform litigation functions. Likewise, it corresponds to this Deputy General Directorate the promotion of research works and the organization of activities aimed at the knowledge and dissemination of legal issues of national or international scope, as well as the organization of training and improvement activities for the civil servants of the State Lawyers Corps.

The following officies are also part of the Office of the Solicitor General:

- The Solicitor's Office before the Supreme Court.
- The Solicitor's Office before the Audiencia Nacional.
- The Solicitor's Office before the Court of Auditors.
- The Solicitor's Office in the different government departments.
- The Solicitor's Office in the different agencies of the Administration.

== History ==
The Office of the Solicitor General was established in 28 December 1849 succeeding the ancient position of "Advisor to the Superintendency General of Finance". The position of advisor was established by Royal Order of 13 May 1786 to assist the minister and treasury officials in all legal and financial matters.

By the middle of the 19th century, the Superintendency General of Finance disappeared because the Ministry of Finance assumed most of its functions and, since it had numerous advisors throughout the department, it was decided in 1849 to unify it by creating the Directorate-General for Public Treasury Litigation (Spanish: Dirección General de lo Contencioso de la Hacienda Pública). With this reform, advisors ceased to be mere advisors and became representatives of the Public Treasury before the courts, that is, its lawyers.

Five years later, the Directorate-General was transformed into the Office of the Advisor-General of the Ministry of Finance (Spanish: Asesoría General del Ministerio de Hacienda). Without major changes for the next twenty years, in 1877 it underwent its most important reform. The 1877 reform added to the Office of the Advisor-General the term "Directorate-General for State Litigation" (Spanish: Dirección General de lo Contencioso del Estado), prohibited the admission of lawsuits against the Administration without first exhausting all administrative appeals and subordinated the Prosecution Ministry to the Advisory-Directorate, which should be consulted on those judicial matters that affect the general interest.

Between the period known as the Sexenio Democrático (Six democratic years), the Office of the Advisor-General was replaced by a small department whithin the Undersecretariat of the Ministry of Finance. Re-established it after this period, from 1881 onwards the name "Directorate-General for State Litigation" definitively replaced that of "Office of the Advisor-General of the Ministry of Finance" and the State Lawyers Corps was created.

A century later, in 1985, the Directorate-General for State Litigation was reorganized once more, transferred to the Ministry of Justice and renamed as "Directorate-General of the State Legal Services". In 2000 it was renamed as "Office of the Solicitor General of the State-Directorate of the State Legal Service" and, since 2022, the name has been simplified to that of "Office of the Solicitor General of the State"
