= Demetrio Carceller Segura =

Spanish politician (1894–1971)

Minister of Industry and Trade of Spain
- In office 16 October 1940 – 20 July 1945
- Prime Minister: Francisco Franco
- Preceded by: Luis Alarcón de la Lastra
- Succeeded by: Juan Antonio Suanzes

Personal details
- Born: Demetrio Carceller Segura; 22 December 1894 Las Parras de Castellote, Kingdom of Spain
- Died: 16 November 1971 (aged 76) Madrid, Spanish State
- Party: FET y de las JONS (National Movement)

Demetrio Carceller Segura (22 December 1894 – 16 November 1971) was a Spanish politician who served as Minister of Industry and Trade of Spain between 1940 and 1945, during the Francoist dictatorship.
