= Catholic Association of Propagandists =

Private Spanish catholic foundation

- Asociación Católica de Propagandistas
- Established: 1908
- Founder: Ángel Ayala
- Headquarters: Madrid
- Official language: Spanish
- Leader: José Masip Marzá

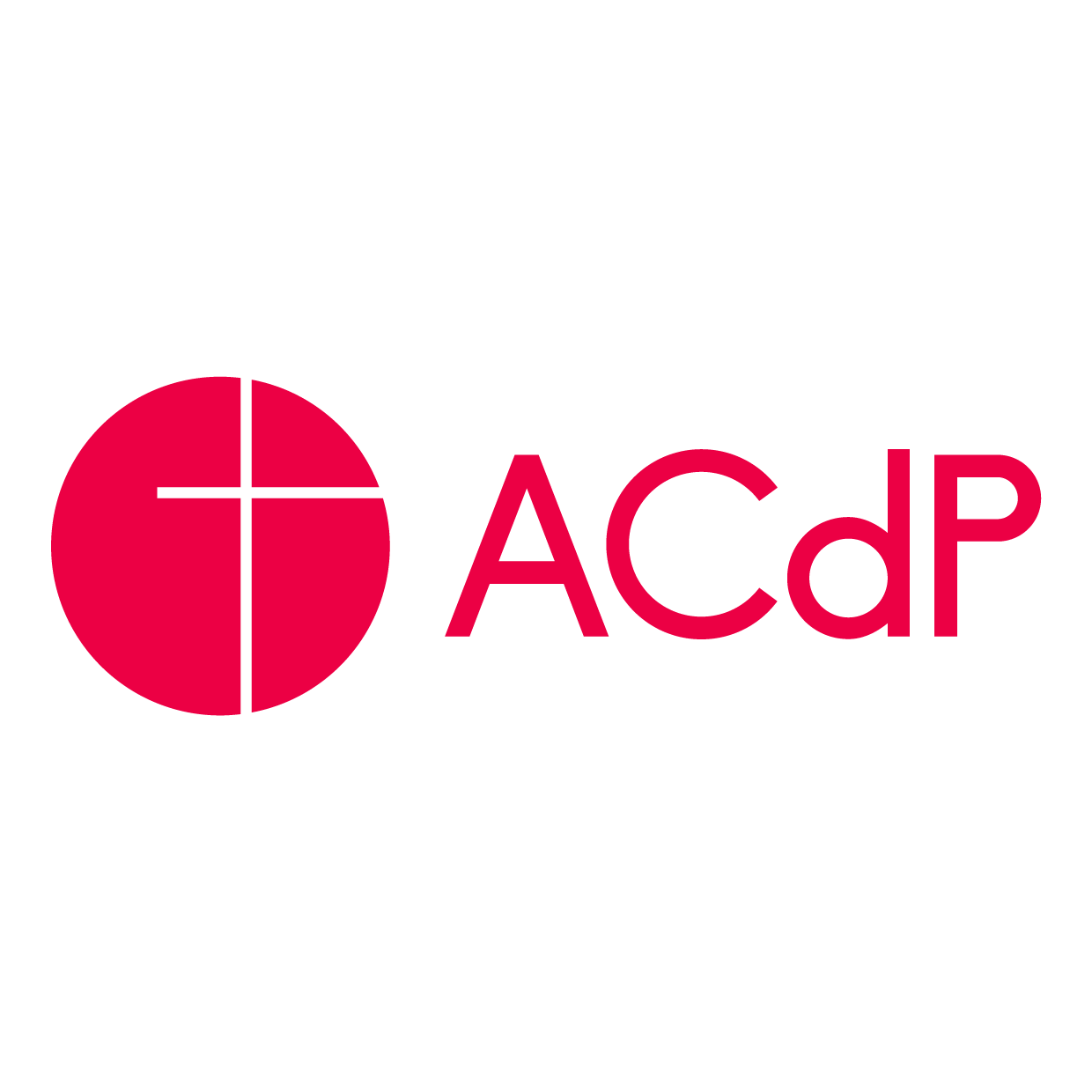
The Catholic Association of Propagandists logo

The Catholic Association of Propagandists (Spanish: Asociación Católica de Propagandistas, ACdP), previously the National Catholic Association of Propagandists (Spanish: Asociación Católica Nacional de Propagandistas, ACNP) and originally founded as the National Catholic Association of Young Propagandists Spanish: Asociación Católico-Nacional de Jóvenes Propagandistas, ACNJP), is a private association of Spanish Catholic faithful founded in 1908 by the Jesuit priest Ángel Ayala. Its goals are oriented towards the propagation of the Catholic faith and the apostolate in public life, training and encouraging its members to actively participate in society, working to make the message of Jesus and the Church present in all areas.

== Notable members ==
- José Larraz López, Minister of Finance of Spain (1939–1941)
- José Ibáñez Martín, Minister of National Education of Spain (1939–1951)
- Pedro Gamero del Castillo, Minister Deputy Secretary-General of FET–JONS, without portfolio (1939–1941)
- Alberto Martín-Artajo, Minister of Foreign Affairs of Spain (1945–1957)
- Joaquín Ruiz-Giménez, Minister of National Education of Spain (1951–1956)
- Fernando María Castiella, Minister of Foreign Affairs of Spain (1957–1969)
- Federico Silva Muñoz, Minister of Public Works of Spain (1965–1970)
- Tomás Garicano, Minister of Governance of Spain (1969–1973)
- Alfredo Sánchez Bella, Minister of Information and Tourism of Spain (1969–1973)

== Bibliography ==
- Sáez Alba, A. (1974). "Introducción a la ACNP". La otra cosa nostra. La Asociación Católica Nacional de Propagandistas y el caso de El Correo de Andalucía (in Spanish). Ruedo ibérico.
- Martín Puerta, Antonio (2015). "La Asociación Católica Nacional de Propagandistas durante la fase central del régimen de Franco". Hispania Sacra. 67 (135): 303–338. doi:10.3989/hs.2015.009. ISSN 0018-215X.
- Barreiro, Cristina (2018). "La ACNdeP y su papel político en el primer franquismo". Hispania Sacra. 70 (142): 681–689. doi:10.3989/hs.2018.047. ISSN 0018-215X. Archived from the original on 31 December 2018.
