= Blas Pérez González =

Spanish jurist and politician (1898–1978)

Minister of Governance of Spain
- In office 3 September 1942 – 25 February 1957
- Prime Minister: Francisco Franco
- Preceded by: Valentín Galarza
- Succeeded by: Camilo Alonso Vega

Prosecutor of the Supreme Court
- In office 10 November 1938 – 3 September 1942
- Preceded by: Leopoldo Garrido Cavero
- Succeeded by: Manuel de la Plaza Navarro (Acting: Ramón García del Valle y Salas)

Personal details
- Born: Blas Pérez González; 13 August 1898 Santa Cruz de La Palma, Kingdom of Spain
- Died: 7 February 1978 (aged 79) Madrid, Spanish State
- Party: FET y de las JONS

Blas Pérez González (13 August 1898 – 7 February 1978) was a Spanish politician who served as Minister of Governance of Spain between 1942 and 1957, during the Francoist dictatorship, who was a member of FET y de las JONS.
