= State Lawyers Corps =

Spanish civil servant organization

Emblem

The State Lawyers Corps (Spanish: Cuerpo de Abogados del Estado) is a body of top civil servants in Spain, dependent on the Solicitor General of the State, itself organically integrated (currently) within the Ministry of Justice.

It was created in 1881. It is formed by licentiate graduates (later graduates) in Law, who join the body after passing a public examination, considered among the hardest to pass in Spain. Experts in the ins and outs of the Public Administration, and with a valued social network, the State Lawyers are also highly sought in the private sector.
