= José Ibáñez Martín =

Spanish politician

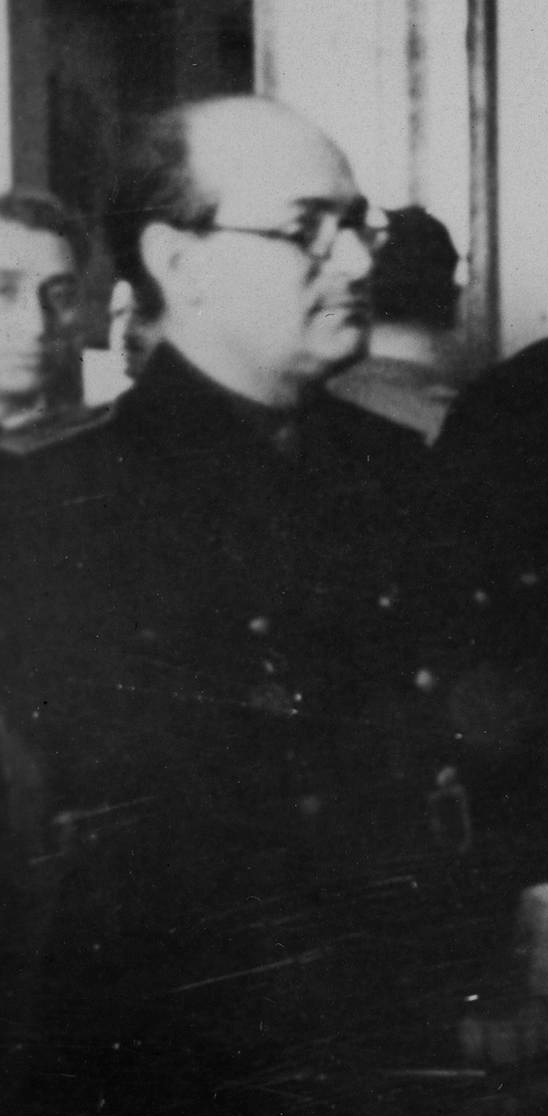
José Ibáñez Martín in 1944

José Ibáñez Martín (18 December 1896 in Valbona, Aragon – 21 December 1969 in Madrid) was a Spanish politician who was a long-serving member of the Cabinet of Francisco Franco: from 1939 to 1951, he served as Minister of National Education.

Between 1939 and 1967 he also founded and served as President of the Spanish National Research Council.

== Biography ==
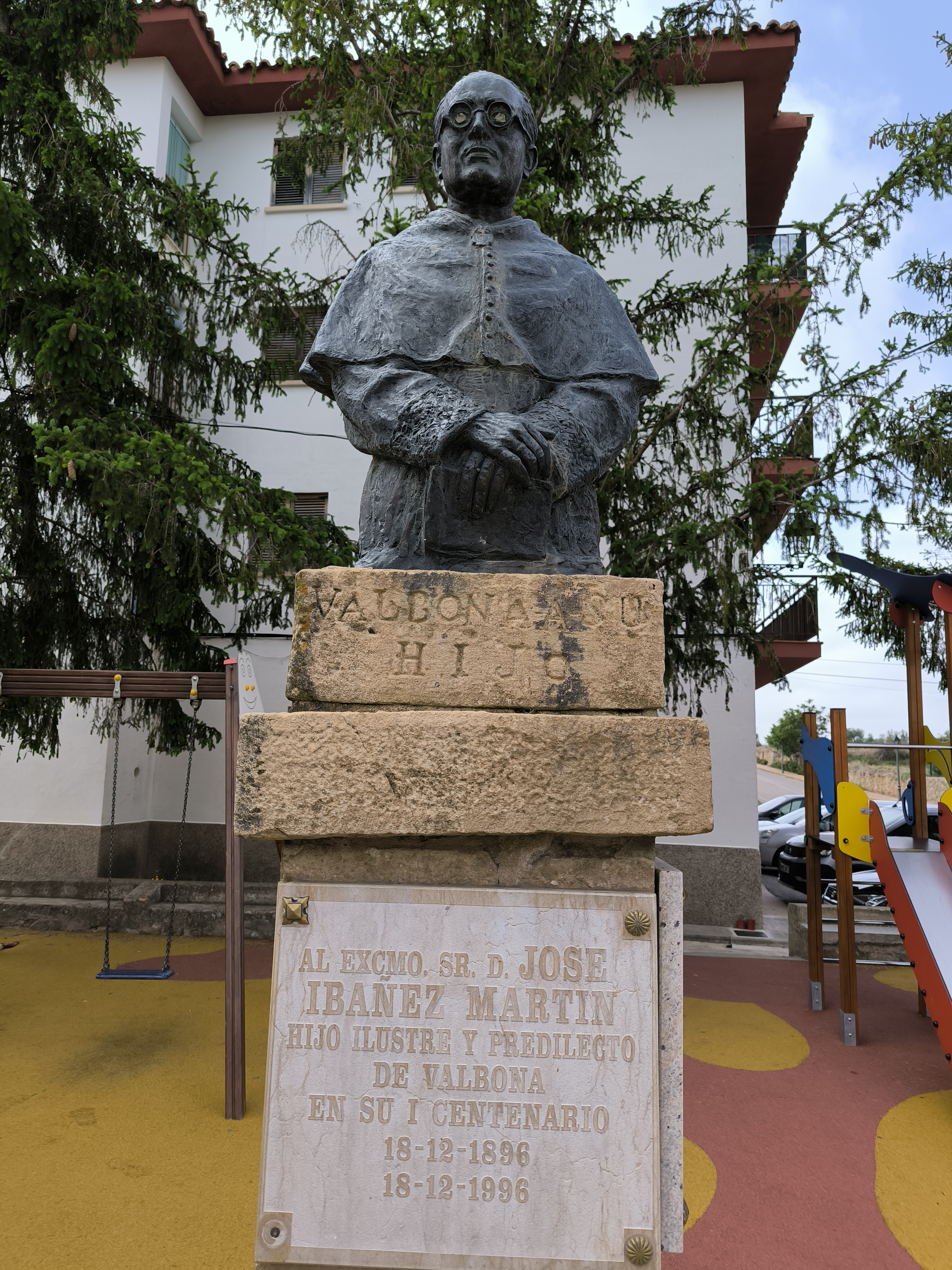
Monument a José Ibáñez Martín a Valbona.

A supporter of Miguel Primo de Rivera, 2nd Marquis of Estella in his youth, during the Second Spanish Republic Ibáñez Martín served as a deputy for the Spanish Confederation of the Autonomous Right (CEDA). He was a member of the Catholic Association of Propagandists (ANCP), the propaganda movement founded by Ángel Herrera Oria that formed the basis for the Catholic party Popular Action. Ibáñez Martín was impressed by Leo XIII and Pius XI.

Thrwoing his lot in with the Nationalist side in the Spanish Civil War, he became staunchly loyal to Francisco Franco. Ibáñez Martín spent part of the civil war out of the country as Franco had despatched him to Latin America with a mission to promote the Nationalist cause amongst the Spanish-speaking people there.

Appointed as Minister of Education in succession to Pedro Sainz Rodríguez in 1939, a post he held until 1951, Ibáñez Martín laid the foundations for the Spanish education system until the 1960s through laws such as the Spanish University Organisation Act (1943) and the Primary Education Act (1945). In general, he opposed the ideas prevailing during the first two years of the Republic, represented by the Free Institution of Education.

As Minister of Education in the early 1940s he ensured that catholics would no longer be hindered in the efforts to obtain teaching posts at universities. Although he was not a member of Opus Dei, Ibáñez Martín was friends with one of its members, José María Albareda, with whom he founded the Spanish National Research Council.

He enjoyed a growth in influence in the immediate aftermath of the Second World War as Franco sought to trim his cabinet of anybody who have a Catholic programme as an alternative to fascism. As a result, Ibáñez Martín was given control over the press as well as retaining his role as Education Minister.

Ibáñez Martín was the Spanish ambassador to Portugal from 1958 to 1969.
