= José Antonio Girón =

Spanish politician

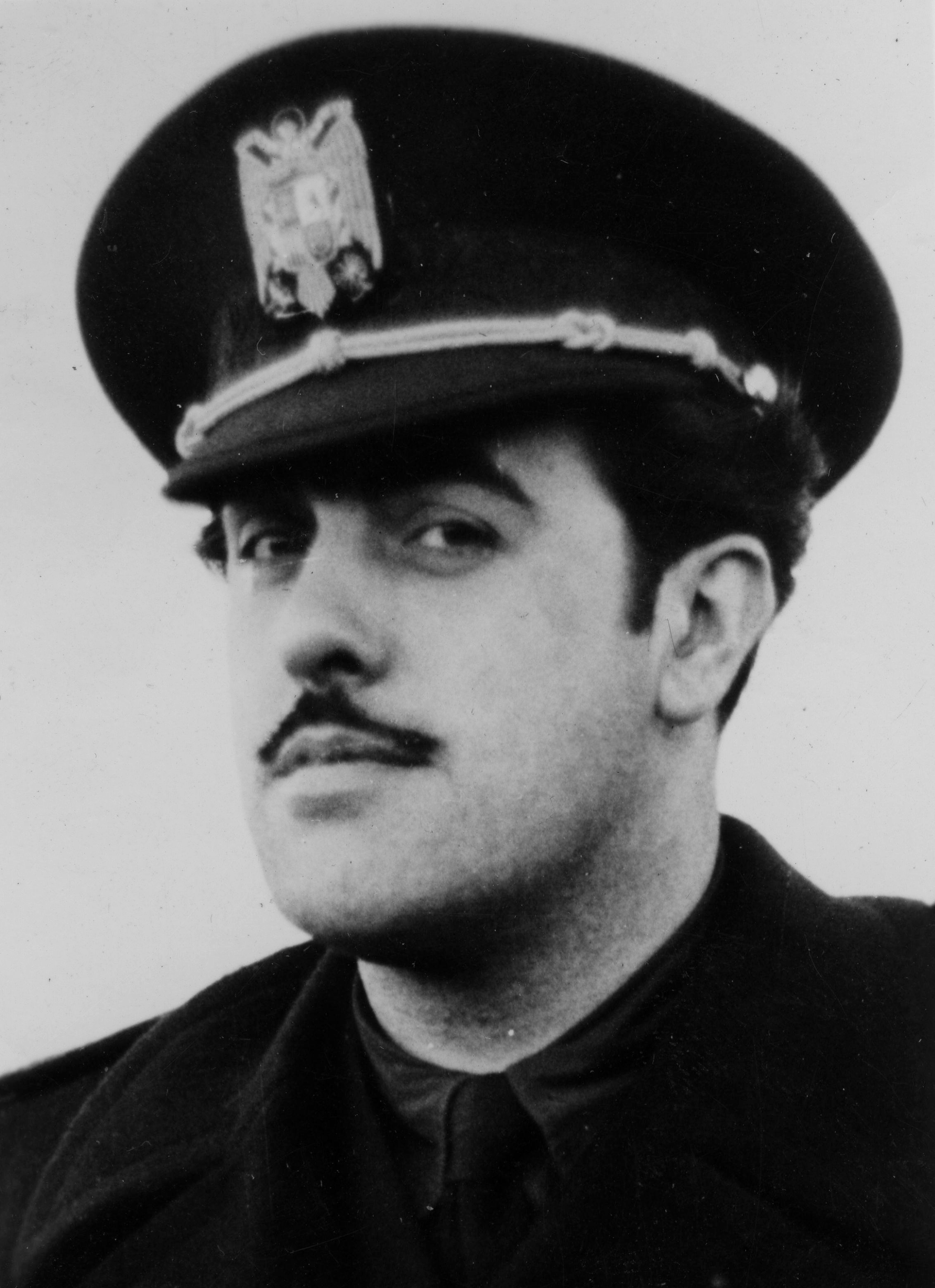
José Antonio Girón in the 1940s.

José Antonio Girón de Velasco (28 August 1911, Herrera de Pisuerga, Palencia – 22 August 1995, Fuengirola, Málaga) was a prominent Spanish Falangist politician. He was minister of Labor (1941–57), counselor of the Council of the Realm and member of the Cortes Españolas. He was one of the most heard voices against any kind of changes during the last years of Francoist regime, taking part in the political group known as "the Bunker", for their reluctance to the Spanish transition to democracy after Franco's death.

He began his political activities during his university studies in Valladolid. In 1931 he joined Juventudes Castellanas de Acción Hispánica (Castilian Youth for Spanish Action), a small political group founded in Valladolid by Onésimo Redondo, that would merge with Ramiro Ledesma's Juntas de Ofensiva Nacional-Sindicalista (Unions of the National-Syndicalist Offensive) and José Antonio Primo de Rivera's Falange Española de las JONS. He fought in the Civil War on the Nationalist side and commanded units of Falangist militias. After the war, he was appointed national delegate of Veterans and in 1941 minister of Labor, when he was only 30. He deployed an intense activity, like the labor institutes for training workers and the development of the social security system (Instituto Nacional de Previsión). He was removed from the Ministry in 1957 according to the liberalizing shift that Franco wished for the Spanish economy (Stabilization Plan). The previous year, Girón had decreed a salary increase that the Spanish economy could not afford.

Throughout Francoism, Girón was one of the leaders of Falange and he increasingly showed his dissent, according to the Falangist principles, to many policies of the regime. Notably, he was strongly opposed to opportunism. He yearned for the Falangist 'pending revolution', as Primo de Rivera's ideas just inspired a few policies but Francoism was not really an actual Falangist regime, but a consensus of rightist and authoritarian tendencies. After Franco's death, both he and Blas Piñar were the natural leaders of the "Bunker" in the Cortes Españolas, and voted against the Political Reform Act of 1976 that allowed the transition to democracy.

Girón died on 22 August 1995.

== Bibliography ==
- Bardavío, Joaquín; Sinova, Justino: Todo Franco: franquismo y antifranquismo de la A a la Z, Barcelona: Plaza & Janés, 2000
- Girón, José Antonio: Si la memoria no me falla, Barcelona: Planeta (memoir)
- Payne, Stanley: The Franco regime, 1936-1975, Madison, Wisconsin: University of Wisconsin Press, 1987
- Preston, Paul: Franco: a Biography, New York: BasicBooks, 1993
