= President of the Regency Council =

During the Francoist dictatorship of Spain, after the Spanish Civil War, the caudillo Francisco Franco created the Regency Council. During his visit to Portugal, from 22 October 1949 to 27 October 1949 several individuals acted as a collegial regency. Otherwise Franco himself held the role until he died on 20 November 1975. It then passed, for two days, to Alejandro Rodríguez de Valcárcel, to allow for the formalities surrounding the restoration of the House of Bourbon, in the person of King Juan Carlos.

== Presidents of Regency Council (1947–1975) ==
President of the Regency Council
Alejandro Rodríguez de Valcárcel	20 November 1975	22 November 1975

== See also ==
- List of Spanish Regents
