= Francoist Spain =

Period of Spanish history (1936–1975)

Coordinates: 40°31′17″N 03°46′30″W

Spanish State Estado Español
- 1936–1975
- State flag (1945–1977) Coat of arms (1945–1977)
- Motto: Una, Grande y Libre ("One, Great and Free"); Plus Ultra ("Further Beyond")
- Anthem: Marcha Granadera ("Grenadier March") Cara al Sol (unofficial) ("Facing the Sun")
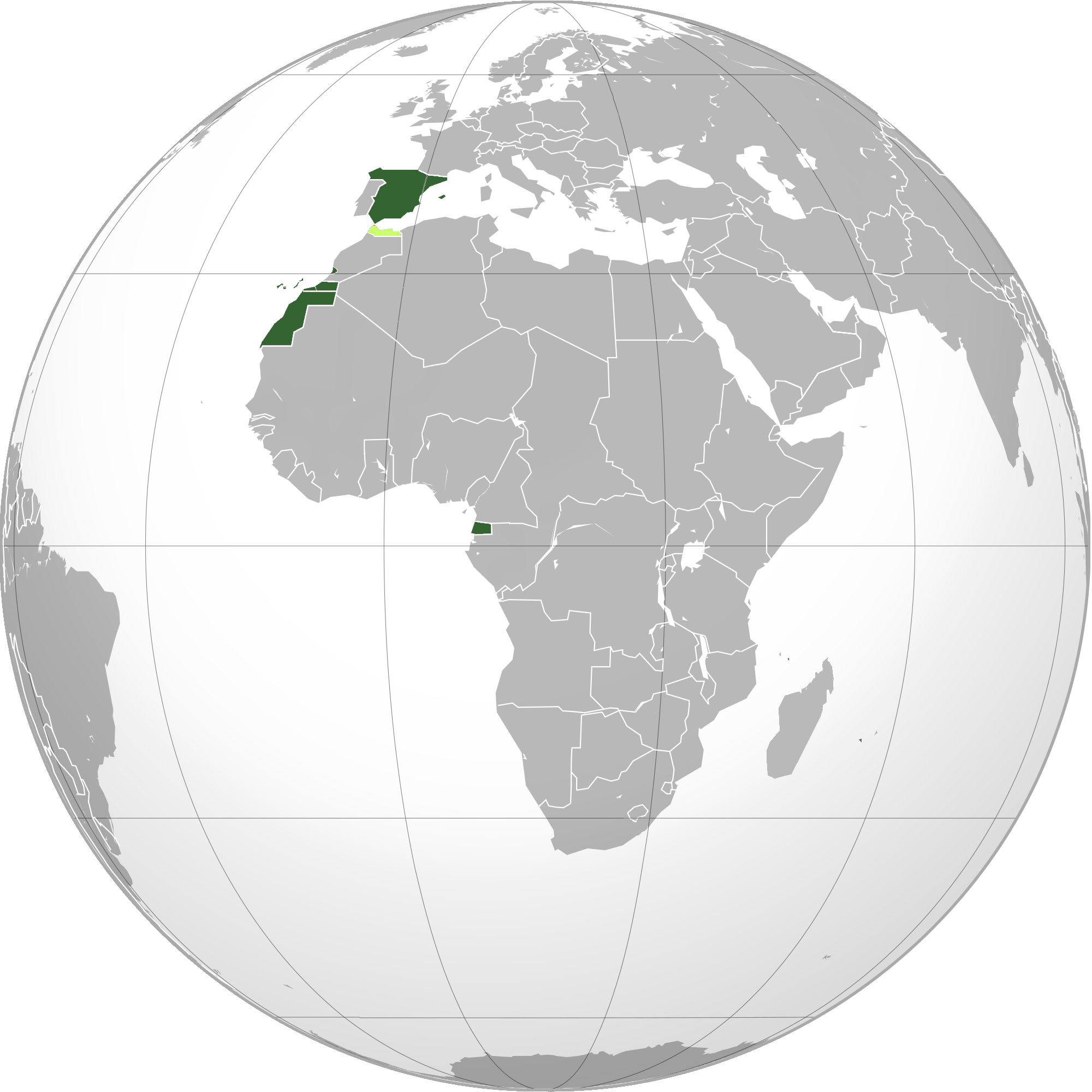
- Territories and colonies of the Spanish State: Spain, Ifni, Western Sahara and Guinea; Protectorate in Morocco; Tangier International Zone
- Capital and largest city: Madrid (Note: In wartime, Salamanca served as the de facto Nationalist capital and centre of power, while administrative functions were moved to Burgos.)
- Official languages: Spanish
- Religion: Catholicism (official, under the doctrine of National Catholicism)
- Demonym: Spanish, Spaniard
- Government: Unitary one-party (Note: The 1937 Unification Degree established FET y de las JONS as the sole legal party of the regime.) dictatorship (Note: The regime went through several transformations, with its anti-democratic nature and Franco as head of state and dictator among the main constants, evolving from a military junta early in the Civil War to matching or being similar to fascist totalitarianism in the 1940s and afterwards, becoming closer to more conventional authoritarian conservatism while still preserving fascist features and base principles and a "major radical fascist ingredient."): de jure monarchy after 1947 (Note: The 1947 Law of Succession declared Spain a de jure kingdom, but Franco remained head of state until 1975.)
- Head of state
  - 1936–1975: Francisco Franco (Note: As Caudillo (since 1938) and Jefe del Estado)
  - 1975: Alejandro Rodríguez de Valcárcel (Note: As President of the Regency Council)
- Prime Minister
  - 1938–1973: Francisco Franco
  - 1973: Luis Carrero Blanco
  - 1973: Torcuato Fernández-Miranda (acting)
  - 1973–1975: Carlos Arias Navarro
- Prince
  - 1969–1975: Juan Carlos de Borbón
- Legislature: None (rule by decree, until 1942); Cortes Españolas (since 1942)
- Historical era: Interwar period; World War II; Cold War
  - Civil War: 17 July 1936
  - Francisco Franco's rule started: 1 October 1936
  - Nationalist victory: 1 April 1939
  - Succession law: 6 July 1947
  - Organic Law: 1 January 1967
  - Death of Francisco Franco: 20 November 1975
  - Regency Council administration: 20–22 November 1975
  - Proclamation of King Juan Carlos I: 22 November 1975

Area
- 1940: 856,045 km^{2} (330,521 sq mi)

Population
  - 1940: 25,877,971
- Currency: Spanish peseta
- Calling code: +34
Preceded by
Nationalist zone
Second Spanish Republic
Spanish West Africa
Spanish Territories on the Gulf of Guinea
Succeeded by
Spanish transition to democracy
Kingdom of Morocco
Equatorial Guinea

Francoist Spain (Spanish: España franquista), also known as Nationalist Spain, Falangist Spain, the Franco regime, or the Franco dictatorship, officially the Spanish State (Estado Español), was a state established in Nationalist-held territories of Spain ruled by Francisco Franco during the Spanish Civil War from 1936 to 1939 and then comprising the whole of Spain from 1939 until Franco's death in 1975.

The regime emerged from the Nationalist side in the Spanish Civil War and developed into a dictatorship centred on Franco and the institutions of the FET y de las JONS, also called Movimiento Nacional, resembling those of Fascist Italy and Nazi Germany or Catholic corporatism. Its ideology revolved around Franco's personality cult, anti-communist and counter-Enlightenment Spanish ultranationalism, National Catholicism, the myth of the Civil War as the national rebirth, and in the earlier phases, national syndicalism. In Francoist regime, historians admit similarities to fascism in terms of functioning and ideology, especially during the first phase called the "First Francoism", during which Spain is characterized from semi-fascist to straightly fascist and as a totalitarian or quasi-totalitarian regime, while afterwards by form it moved in a less fascist and "more conventionally authoritarian" direction, Despite seemingly moving away from fascism after the 1940s, it kept its base principles and core myths and continued supporting fascists and neo-fascism abroad. The opinions on whether the Spanish State was fascist have evolved over time: while a line that emerged in the 1960s described it as conservative authoritarian and pluralist as opposed to fascism, later authors have been increasingly noting the fascist and totalitarian characteristics while contesting the claims about its pluralism and have been defining it as a fascist regime, thus leaving the issue to a debate.

During the Second World War, the Spanish State remained formally non-belligerent or neutral, but in practice was supportive of the Axis powers. After a period of postwar isolation and autarky, the regime shifted in the 1950s toward economic liberalization and technocratic government. Following Franco's death in 1975, Spain entered the Spanish transition to democracy.

== Establishment ==
On 1 October 1936, Franco was formally recognised as Caudillo of Spain—the Spanish equivalent of the Italian Duce and the German Führer—by the Junta de Defensa Nacional (National Defense Junta), which governed the territories occupied by the Nationalists. In April 1937, Franco assumed control of the Falange Española de las JONS, then led by Manuel Hedilla, who had succeeded José Antonio Primo de Rivera, who was executed in November 1936 by the Republican government. He merged it with the Carlist Comunión Tradicionalista to form the Falange Española Tradicionalista y de las JONS. The sole legal party of Francoist Spain, it was the main component of the Movimiento Nacional (National Movement). The Falangists were concentrated at the local government and grassroots level, entrusted with harnessing the Civil War's momentum of mass mobilisation through their auxiliaries and trade unions by collecting denunciations of enemy residents and recruiting workers into the trade unions. The new government was a one-party authoritarian dictatorship explicitly modeled after Fascist Italy and Nazi Germany albeit with its own unique Spanish characteristics. Although Falangists held some important posts, the Falange's role in the regime remained limited and carefully delimited by Franco, with major areas of power retained by other institutions, especially the Catholic Church and the Army. However, the Falange remained the sole party.

The Francoists took control of the entirety of Spain through a comprehensive and methodical war of attrition (guerra de desgaste) which involved the imprisonment and executions of Spaniards found guilty of supporting the values promoted by the Republic: regional autonomy, liberal or social democracy, free elections, socialist leanings, and women's rights, including the vote. The right-wing considered these "enemy elements" to comprise an "anti-Spain" that was the product of Bolsheviks and a "Judeo-Masonic conspiracy". The latter allegation pre-dated Falangism, having evolved after the Reconquista of the Iberian Peninsula from the Islamic Moors. Falangist founder Jose Antonio Primo de Rivera had a more tolerant position than the National Socialists in Germany. This was influenced by the small size of the Jewish community in Spain at the time that did not favor the development of strong antisemitism, despite its history. Primo de Rivera saw the solution to the "Jewish problem" in Spain as simple: the conversion of Jews to Catholicism.

With the end of the Spanish Civil War, according to the regime's own figures there were more than 270,000 men and women held in prisons and some 500,000 had fled into exile. Large numbers of those captured were returned to Spain or interned in Nazi concentration camps as "stateless enemies". Between six and seven thousand exiles from Spain died in Mauthausen. It has been estimated that more than 200,000 Spaniards died in the first years of the dictatorship from 1940 to 1942 as a result of political persecution, hunger and disease related to the conflict.

Francisco Franco and Adolf Hitler at the Meeting at Hendaye, 1940

Spain's strong ties with the Axis powers led Franco to seriously consider joining them during the Second World War for ideological sympathies and irredentism with a particular focus on reclaiming the British territory of Gibraltar and taking over French Morocco, with the ideal of merging it with Spanish Morocco, alongside annexing the Oran district of Algeria, and French Cameroon as well as large amounts of food, oil, grain and other resources. This was partially fulfilled by Spain taking over the international city of Tangier after Germany defeated France. Franco would then send Juan Vigón to speak with Hitler, followed by a subsequent letter explaining Spanish demands. Hitler initially ignored such an offer, convinced that the war would soon be over and Britain would eventually come asking for terms of peace. Eventually, Hitler and the German government would turn their attention to Spanish belligerence in response to hardened British resistance during the Battle of Britain, chiefly to seize Gibraltar, and initially agreed to its demands (particularly territorial ones), but made unreasonable terms such as asking for the annexation of one of the Canary Islands and Spanish Guinea alongside territorial bases in Spanish Morocco, which were rejected by the Spaniards. These negotiations culminated in the Meeting at Hendaye between Franco and Hitler on October 23, 1940. The meeting ended in failure due to Franco's extensive demands and Hitler's reluctance to fulfill them to maintain friendly relations with Vichy France after the Battle of Dakar and disillusionment over Spanish rejection of German territorial demands during the negotiations. Another attempt at bringing Spain into the war for Operation Felix in December 1940 involving Franco and Wilhelm Canaris also ended in failure with Franco himself citing Britain's uncontested naval and aerial dominance, the worsening economic conditions, reliance on food and oil imports from the Allies and the Germans' lack of firm commitments. For the rest of the war, Spain remained neutral but continued to assist the Axis through various means such as sending the Blue Division to fight on the Eastern Front, allowing German submarines to operate in Spanish ports, permitting Gestapo spies to operate in Spain and sending tungsten and foodstuffs to Germany.

Spanish ties to the Axis resulted in its international ostracism and isolation in the early years following the war as Spain was not allowed to join the United Nations and was explicitly condemned in a 1946 resolution, ensuring that Spain would not become a founding member until 1955. (Note: See member states of the United Nations.) This changed by the early 1950s with the Cold War that soon followed the end of hostilities in 1945, in the face of which Franco's strong anti-communism naturally tilted its regime to ally with the United States. Independent political parties and trade unions were banned throughout the duration of the dictatorship. Nevertheless, once decrees for economic stabilisation were put forth by the late 1950s, the way was opened for massive foreign investment—"a watershed in post-war economic, social and ideological normalisation leading to extraordinarily rapid economic growth"—that marked Spain's "participation in the Europe-wide post-war economic normality centred on mass consumption and consensus, in contrast to the concurrent reality of the Soviet bloc".

On 26 July 1947, Spain was declared a kingdom, but no monarch was designated until in 1969 Franco established Juan Carlos of Bourbon as his official heir-apparent. Franco was to be succeeded by Luis Carrero Blanco as Prime Minister with the intention of continuing the Francoist regime, but those hopes ended with his 1973 assassination by the Basque separatist group ETA. With the death of Franco on 20 November 1975, Juan Carlos became the King of Spain. He initiated the country's subsequent transition to democracy, ending with Spain becoming a constitutional monarchy with an elected parliament and autonomous devolved governments.

== Government ==
After Franco's victory in 1939, the Falange was declared the sole legally sanctioned political party in Spain and it asserted itself as the main component of the National Movement. In a state of emergency-like status, Franco ruled with, on paper, more power than any Spanish leader before or since. He was not even required to consult his cabinet for most legislation. According to historian Stanley G. Payne, Franco had more day-to-day power than Adolf Hitler or Joseph Stalin possessed at the respective heights of their power. Payne noted that Hitler and Stalin at least maintained rubber-stamp parliaments, while Franco dispensed with even that formality in the early years of his rule. According to Payne, the lack of even a rubber-stamp parliament made Franco's government "the most purely arbitrary in the world." The 100-member National Council of the Movement served as a makeshift legislature until the passing of the organic law of 1942 and the Ley Constitutiva de las Cortes (Constituent Law of the Cortes) the same year, which established the Cortes Españolas.

The Organic Law made the executive government ultimately responsible for passing all laws, while defining the Cortes as a purely advisory body elected by neither direct nor universal suffrage. The Cortes had no power over government spending, and the government was not responsible to it: ministers were appointed and dismissed by Franco alone as the "Chief" of state and government. The Ley del Referendum Nacional (Law of the National Referendum), passed in 1945 approved for all "fundamental laws" to be approved by a popular referendum, in which only the heads of families could vote. Local municipal councils were appointed similarly by heads of families and local corporations through local municipal elections while mayors were appointed by the government. It was thus one of the most centralised countries in Europe and certainly the most centralised in Western Europe following the fall of the Portuguese Estado Novo in the Carnation Revolution.

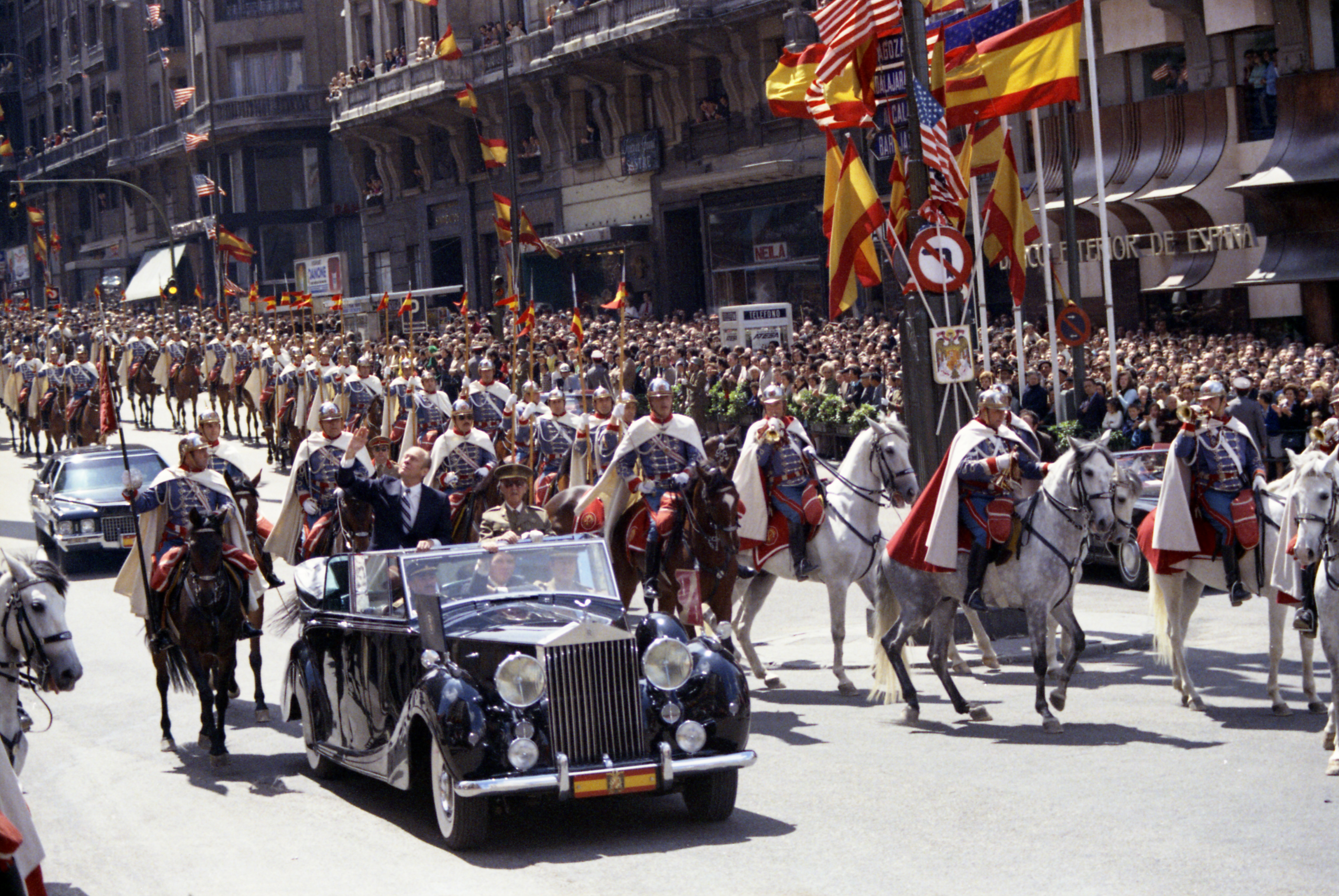
Franco and U.S. President Gerald Ford riding in a ceremonial parade in Madrid, 1975

The referendum law was used twice during Franco's rule—in 1947, when a referendum revived the Spanish monarchy with Franco as de facto regent for life with sole right to appoint his successor; and in 1966, another referendum was held to approve a new "organic law", or constitution, supposedly limiting and clearly defining Franco's powers as well as formally creating the modern office of Prime Minister of Spain. By delaying the issue of republic versus monarchy for his 36-year dictatorship and by refusing to take up the throne himself in 1947, Franco sought to antagonise neither the monarchical Carlists (who preferred the restoration of a Bourbon) nor the republican "old shirts" (original Falangists). Franco ignored the claim to the throne of Infante Juan, Count of Barcelona, son of the last king, Alfonso XIII, who designated himself as his heir; Franco found him too liberal. Instead, in 1969, Franco selected the young Juan Carlos of Bourbon, son of Infante Juan, as his officially designated heir to the throne, shortly after his 30th birthday (the minimum age required under the Law of Succession).

In 1973, due to old age and to lessen his burdens in governing Spain he resigned as Prime Minister and named Navy Admiral Luis Carrero Blanco to the post, but Franco remained as Chief of State, Commander-in-Chief of the Armed Forces and Jefe del Movimiento (Chief of the Movement). However, Carrero Blanco was assassinated in the same year and Carlos Arias Navarro became the country's new Prime Minister.

== Armed forces ==
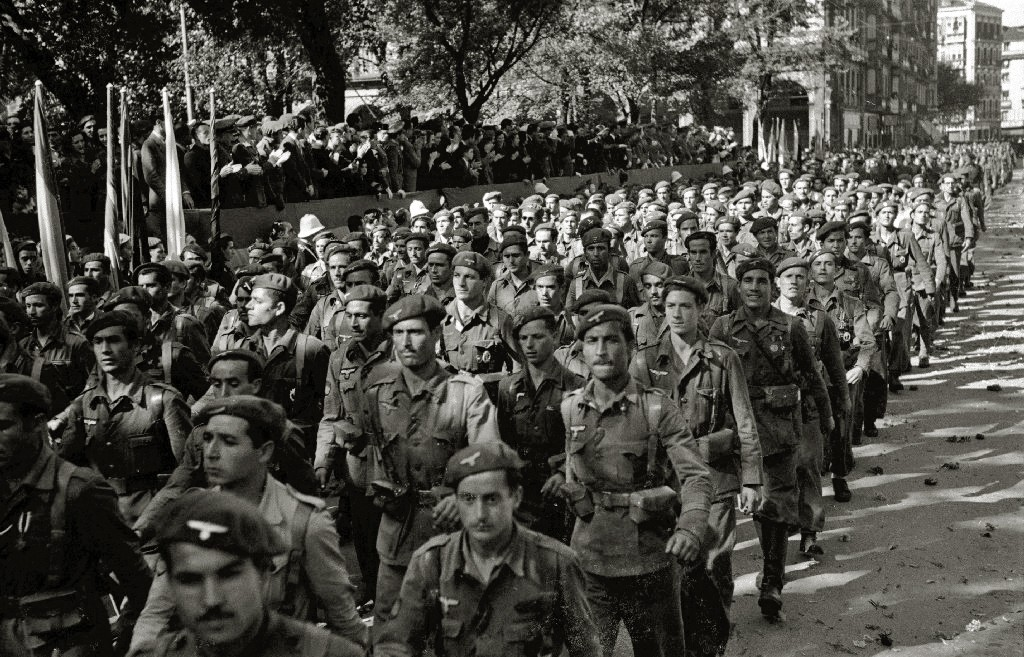
Armed forces in San Sebastián, 1942

During the first year of peace, Franco drastically reduced the size of the Spanish Army—from almost one million at the end of the Civil War to 250,000 in early 1940, with most soldiers two-year conscripts. Concerns about the international situation, Spain's possible entry into World War II, and threats of invasion led him to undo some of these reductions. In November 1942, with the Allied landings in North Africa and the German occupation of France bringing hostilities closer than ever to Spain's border, Franco ordered a partial mobilization, bringing the army to over 750,000 men. The Air Force and Navy also grew in numbers and in budgets to 35,000 airmen and 25,000 sailors by 1945, although for fiscal reasons Franco had to restrain attempts by both services to undertake dramatic expansions. The army maintained a strength of about 400,000 men until the end of the Second World War.

== Colonial empire and decolonisation ==
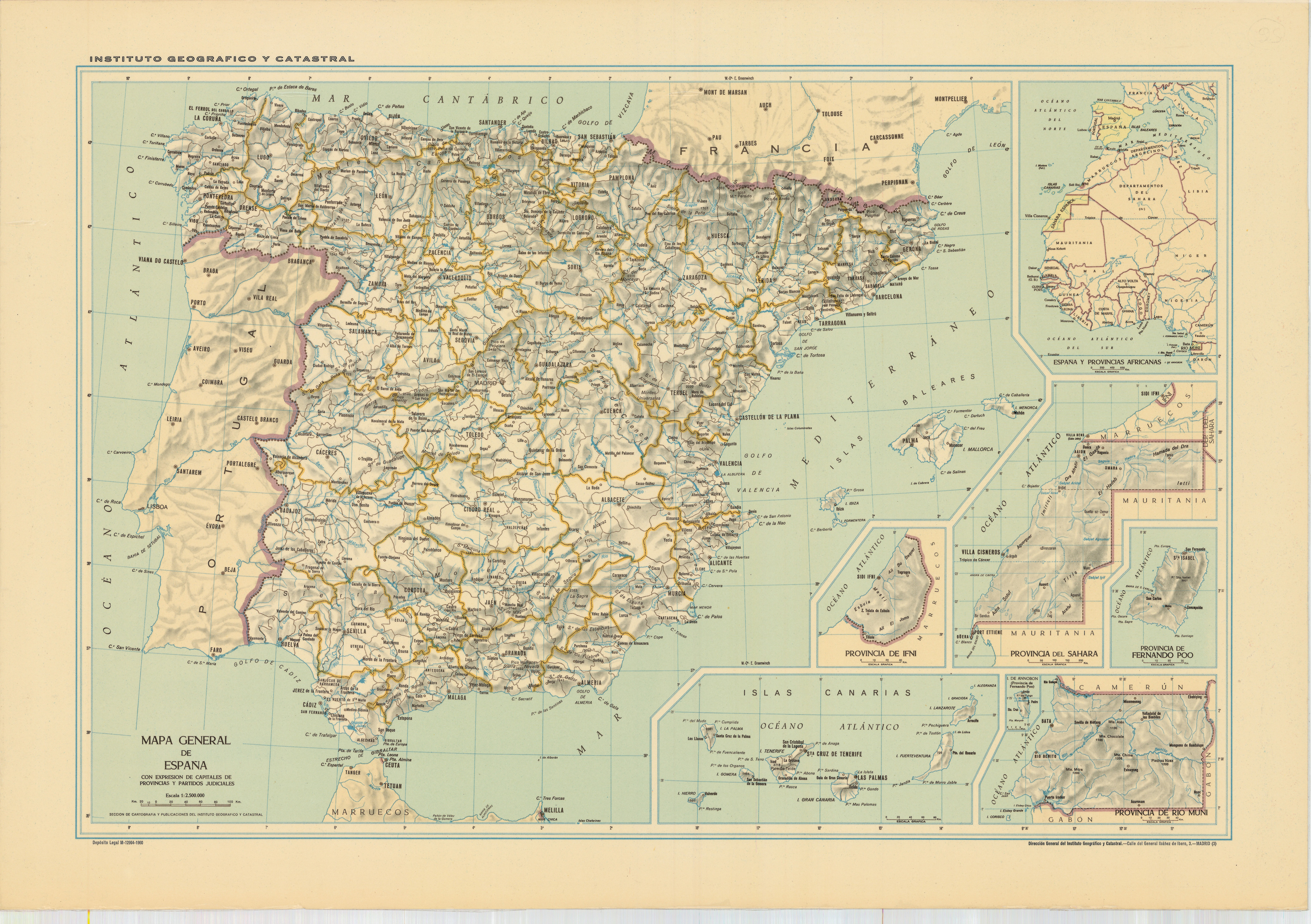
Map of Spain in 1960. Present-day Equatorial Guinea and Western Sahara, as well as the Ifni territory (Morocco), were still part of Spain.

Franco reflecting on his time in Africa said that “Without Africa I can scarcely explain myself to myself, nor can I explain myself properly to my comrades in arms.”

While it attempted to keep them, Francoist Spain was forced to decolonize the last remnants of its colonial empire in north and central Africa. During the Algerian War (1954–1962), Madrid became the base of the Organisation armée secrète right-wing French Army group which sought to preserve French Algeria. Despite this, Franco was forced to make some concessions. When the French protectorate in Morocco became independent in 1956, Spain surrendered its Spanish protectorate in Morocco to Mohammed V, retaining only a few exclaves, the Plazas de soberanía. In 1958, Spanish Sahara and Sid Infi became de jure provinces within Spain, and in 1959, Spanish Guinea became an overseas province. This was an effort to avoid decolonisation by the Spanish Government.

In 1968, under United Nations pressure, Franco granted Spain's colony of Equatorial Guinea its independence and the next year ceded the exclave of Ifni to Morocco. The year after, Mohammed V invaded Spanish Sahara during the Ifni War (known as the "Forgotten War" in Spain). Only in 1975, with the Green March and the military occupation, did Morocco take control of all of the former Spanish territories in the Sahara. Under Franco, Spain also pursued a campaign to gain sovereignty of the British overseas territory of Gibraltar and closed its border in 1969. The border would not be fully reopened until 1985.

== Francoism ==
Initially the regime embraced the definition of a totalitarian state or the nacional-sindicalista labels, former inspired by Fascist Italy and Nazi Germany; national syndicalism became one of the main ideological components of the earlier phases of the regime. Following the defeat of Fascism in World War II, "organic democracy" was the new moniker the regime adopted for itself, yet it only sounded credible to staunch believers. Other later soft definitions include "authoritarian regime" or "constituent or developmental dictatorship", the latter having inner backing from within the regime. The consistent points in Francoism throughout history included authoritarianism, anti-Communism, Spanish nationalism - more so, ultranationalism, national Catholicism, and a highly centralised state; the regime has also been described as strongly marked by anti-Masonry since the beginning of the Civil War; unlike some nationalist dictators, Franco rejected the Enlightenment ideas. While the regime evolved along with its protracted history, its essence remained, underpinned by the legal concentration of all powers into a single person, Francisco Franco, "Caudillo of Spain by the Grace of God", embodying national sovereignty and "only responsible before God and History". The estimates of proximity of the regime to fascism has changed over time as well, with the authors before 1964 typically viewing it as fascist totalitarian, then afterwards as authoritarian, pluralist and conservative; then these estimates have been increasingly contested as well, with more recent authors defining it as fascist or emphasizing its relation to fascism once again.

Regarding Franco personally, Stanley G. Payne, a scholar of Spain and fascism, asserted that "scarcely any of the serious historians and analysts of Franco consider him to be a core fascist", and Paul Preston agrees that Franco's personal beliefs were not fascist but rather "deeply conservative", what according to Preston did not change him leading a fascist regime. However, Richard Griffiths argues that such distinction between Franco's conservatism and fascism would not be understood by Franco himself or his contemporaries. Other authors write that while Franco was note a "complete fascist," he sympathized with fascism and its ideas, what may explain his regime supporting fascists and neo-fascism after 1945.

=== Development ===
The Falange Española de las JONS, a fascist party formed during the Second Republic, was fused by Franco with the Carlists in April 1937 to create the Falange Española Tradicionalista y de las JONS (FET y de las JONS), which became the regime's official political movement. During Franco's rule it functioned as the sole legal political organization and was commonly referred to as the Movimiento Nacional ("National Movement").

The United Nations Security Council voted in 1946 to deny the Franco regime recognition until it developed a more representative government.

=== Fascism and authoritarianism ===
While the undemocratic and dictatorial nature of the regime has always been something universally agreed upon, as time went, estimates of its precise nature have been changing. The labels applied to Francoist Spain in literature vary: they inclide fascism, or a traditional military dictatorship, or a personalist dictatorship "tinged with fascist elements in its repressive aparatus", the only constants of which were its anti-democratic nature and Franco as head of state, or as a regime which underwent fascisation without reaching the point of becoming a fascist regime.

Until 1964, it was commonly defined as totalitarian and as a Spanish variation of fascism. Then, amidst the Cold War (in which Franco was on the side of the Western Bloc), the political scientist Juan José Linz presented a different line of interpretation, arguing that it was 'authoritarian as opposed to fascist totalitarian; his arguments were tat the regime exhibited 'limited political pluralism' through the heterogeneous composition of the regime coalition, and the predominance of the army, the Church and conservative elites over the single-party model found in Fascist Italy and Nazi Germany; Linz claimed that Francoism lacked a totalitarian ideology. Linz was either accused of whitewashing the regime or being praised as the elaborator of its "first scientific conceptualization"; this led to a debate on whether the regime was authoritarian or fascist, or totalitarian and non-fascist, or fascist and authoritarian. Later authors have subjected Liz's paradigm to criticism. Though the abstractions Linz based on his perception of Francoism became important for general categories of political science, critics noted that Spain was far less static and much more ideological in terms of nationalism, fascism and Catholicism than Linz seemingly thought or publicly presented, while what he defined as 'limited pluralism' of Francoism is in fact found in regimes called totalitarian, like Fascist Italy. Conteporary authors note that Linz's claims about the "semi-opposition" and division of power within the Spanish State are not confirmed by archival sources. A range of contemporary historians believe it accurate to use the term totalitarianism towards Francoism, though usually they limit it with the eariler phase of "First Francoism". Here, Julián Sanz Hoya writes that "Franco's regime in the first twenty years had totalizing pretensions in relation to social control (including private life, morality, and customs), the monopoly of politics and public space, and even the control of the economy (think of the strong interventionism of autarky)." Helen Graham writes that Spain was "fascist in the 1940s and totalitarian for far longer, until macro-economic changes... hollowed out Francoism's own ideological categories (and its 'disciplinary' efficacy), but not its obsession with social control, which it called 'social peace'."

After Linz presented his concepts, many authors followed him. Similarly to Linz, Walter Laqueur in 1996 wrote that the Francoist regime, a "strongly authoritarian" one, was ruled by "conservatives in all essential respects" with the fascists (Falangists) becoming only "junior partners in the government" "without being able to shape it substantially." Enrique Moradiellos in 2017 characterized Francoism as "above all" a military dictatorship that was first fascistized and later transformed into an essentially authoritarian regime, despite retaining fascistic features. Linz later admitted that originally the regime had totalitarian tendencies; later authors following the definition also assessed it to a regime most close to fascist totalitarianism of all the regimes in Europe except for Italy and Germany.

Stanley G. Payne in a 1987 work follows Linz in definition of Francoism as 'authoritarian' as opposed to fascist, but describes the regime of 1936–1945 as initially "semi-fascist", while later emphasizing its evolution into a more conservative, Catholic-corporatist authoritarian order. Roger Griffin, a "new consensus" historian of fascism like Payne, called Francoism a para-fascist regime to distinguish it from "true" fascism shaped by "revolutionary mission." Ismael Saz treats Francoism as a regime that underwent fascistization without ever becoming a fully fascist state in the Italian or German sense, though its first phase may be called fascist or quasi-fascist and totalitarian or quasi-totalitarian. On this reading, the dictatorship combined fascist elements with military rule, political Catholicism, monarchism and traditionalist conservatism, and its character changed over time, especially after World War II and again with the rise of technocratic elites in the late 1950s.

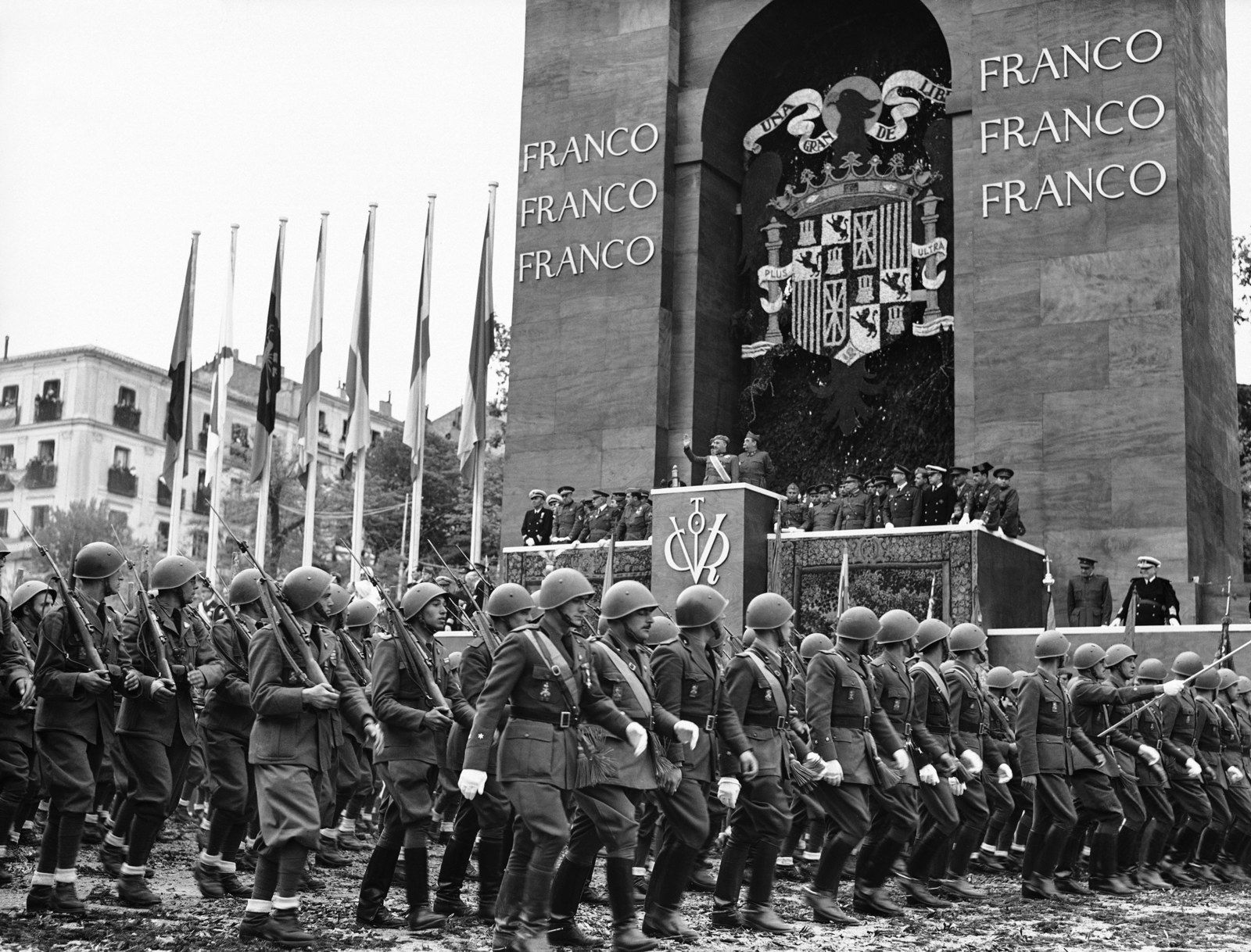
Franco (at the tribune) performing the Roman salute during the parade celebrating his victory in the Spanish Civil War, 1939

Still, later scholars, such as Paul Preston after 2005 and Julián Casanova in 2010 define the regime as belonging to the family of European fascism. A 2021 author calls it "Fascismo a la española" ("Spanish-style Fascism") or as a specific variant of Fascism marked by the preponderance of the Catholic Church, the Armed Forces and Traditionalism; the Oxford Living Dictionary and Oxford's A Dictionary of Philosophy present Franco's regime as an example of fascism. Authors like Preston and Casanova, believe it adequate to classify Francoism as a form of fascism, even though with a specific Catholic-traditionalist and corporative structure and a specifically important role of the military. The main points made by these historians are that Fascist Italy and to a lesser extent Nazi Germany were similar heterogenous alliances of radical fascism and conservatism and displayed similar 'limited pluralism', while the Nationalist faction as a whole may be regarded as a fascist movement, since in the course of the Civil War the Nationalists displayed a unity of "regiments in the same army", having passed through radicalization and fascization during the war and prior to it. Ferran Gallego in 2019 noted that the regime shared essential similarities with fascist regimes of Italy and Germany in culture, politics and social sphere, and that the internal unity of the Nationalists led to them establishing a fascist regime. Meanwhile, the alliance of rightist factions cited as 'pluralism' may be compared to the one which took place in Fascist Italy.

Martin Blinkhorn here follows Preston. He writes that all regimes called fascist (Germany included) in fact were not fully fascist, but coalitions radicalized to different degrees. He thus believes Fascist Italy to be similar to Spain as a compromise between the fascist and national syndicalist radicals with authoritarian clerical tendencies, conservative elites and traditional institutions like the army, and calls Francoism "the only European regime with a major radical fascist ingredient to survive long beyond 1945." At the same time, he writes that after its "fascist phase", the regime in terms of form became "more conventionally authoritarian."

Some recent studies emphasize the ideological similarities of Francoism and fascism and examined the myths at the core of Francoism, noting that it propagated a concept of a "New Man" as an ideal to be used for rebuilding of the Spanish society through the "bonfire" of the Spanish Civil War, similarly to fascism in other countries; in Spain the "New Man" was based on an image of a "Crusader knight" guided by "combatitive Christianity." The Civil War as the collective rebirth was thus the central myth of the regime. Authors of recent studies like Justin Crumbaugh and Nil Santiáñez believe that Francoism as a form of fascism should be regarded in its own terms and in connection through domestic history of politics and colonialism rather than defined through deviations from Germany and Italy, what "will enable deeper understanding not only of Spanish fascism but of fascism as a whole"; such authors stress that Francoism had been a profound influence for the European, Latin American and U. S. far-right after World War II.

Later authors also noted that the formal changes after 1943-1945 did not necessarily mean a meaningful "defascistization" as suggested by Payne, and while Falangism lost its hegemony, it remained the centre of political life in important areas, while the regime kept its base principles, 'vertical syndicalism' included. The Spanish State also supported neo-fascist movements in Europe up to the 1960s and, after World War II, the "ratlines" for fascists and war criminals.

=== Spanish nationalism ===
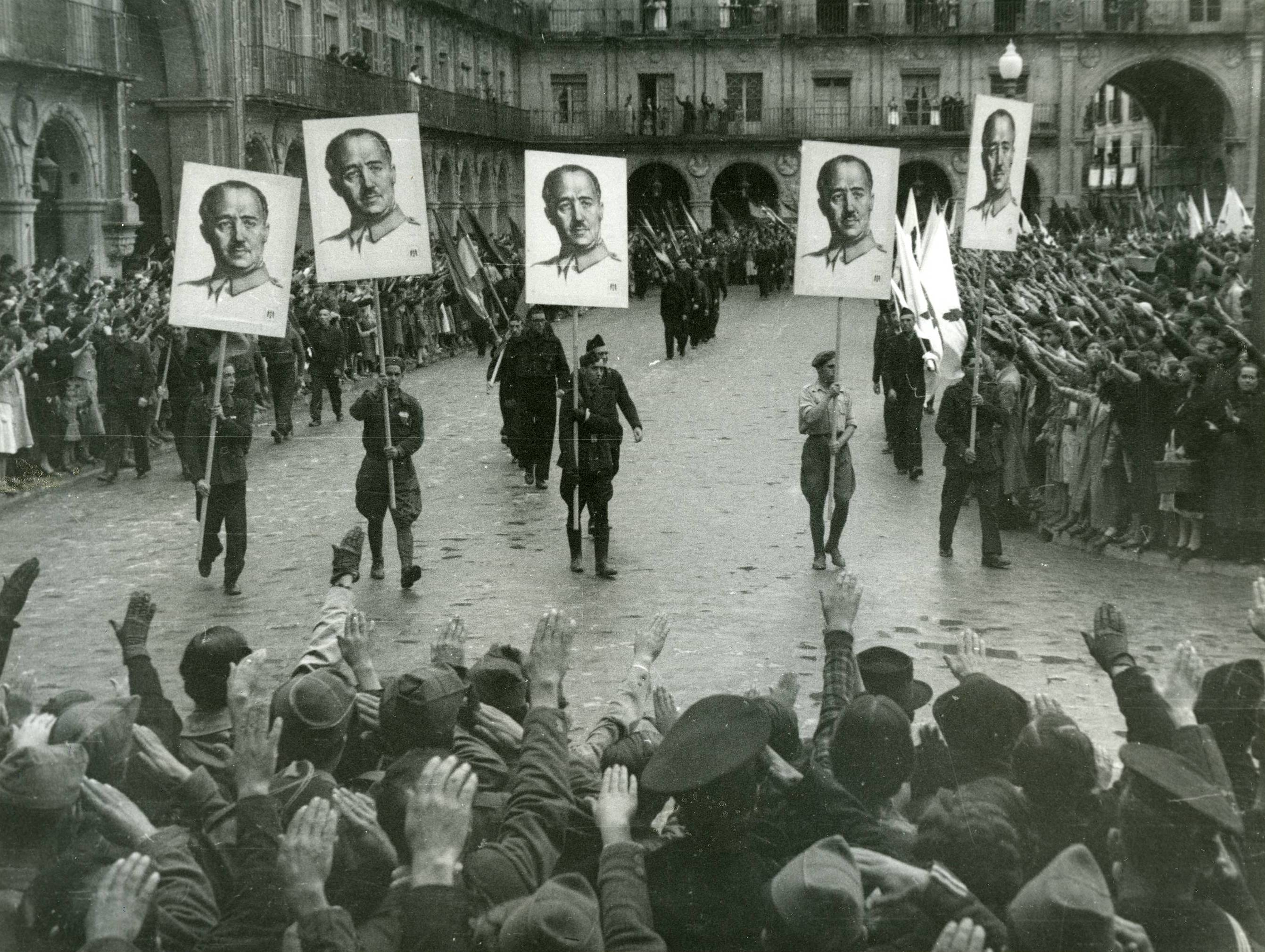
Francoist demonstration in Salamanca in 1937

Franco's Spanish nationalism promoted a Castilian-centric unitary national identity by repressing Spain's cultural diversity. Bullfighting and flamenco were promoted as national traditions, while those traditions not considered Spanish were suppressed. Franco's view of Spanish tradition was somewhat artificial and arbitrary: while some regional traditions were suppressed, Flamenco, an Andalusian tradition, was considered part of a larger, national identity. All cultural activities were subject to censorship and many were forbidden entirely, often in an erratic manner. This cultural policy relaxed somewhat over time, particularly after the Press Law of 1966 gave the press greater freedom and influence.

Franco was reluctant to enact any form of administrative and legislative decentralisation and kept a fully centralised form of government with a similar administrative structure to that established by the House of Bourbon and General Miguel Primo de Rivera. Francoist Spain was a highly centralised state, and regional self-government was not restored after the Civil War. These structures were modelled after the centralised French state. As a result of this type of governance, government attention and initiatives were irregular and often depended more on the goodwill of government representatives than on regional needs. Thus inequalities in schooling, health care or transport facilities among regions were patent: historically affluent regions like Madrid, Catalonia or the Basque Country fared much better than others such as Extremadura, Galicia or Andalusia.

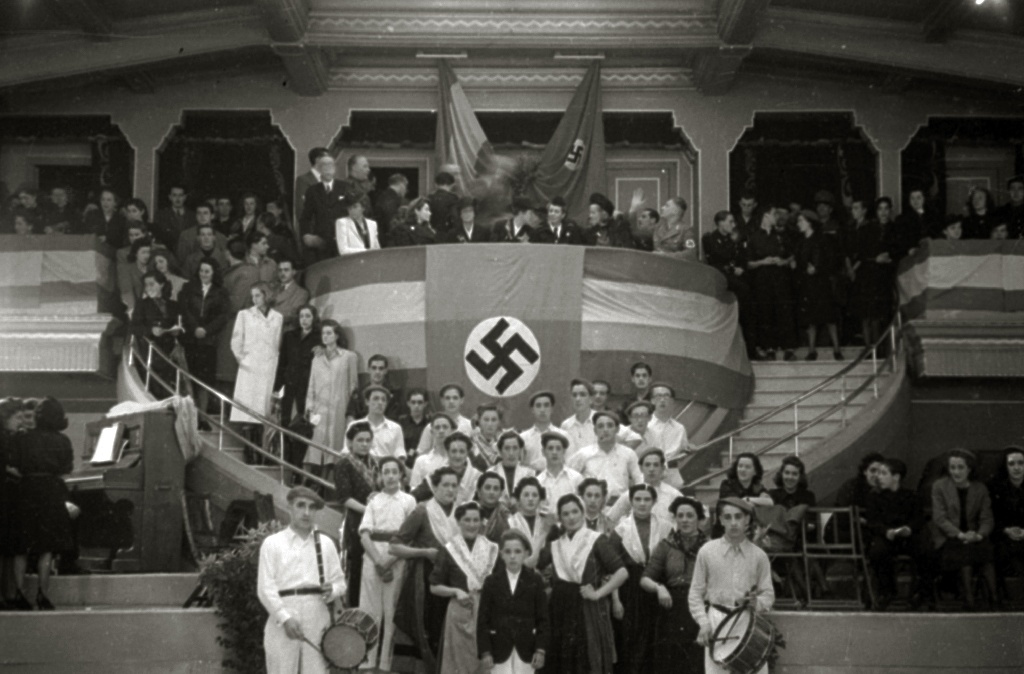
Falangist celebration in 1941

Franco eliminated the autonomy granted by the Second Spanish Republic to the regions and abolished the centuries-old fiscal privileges and autonomy (the fueros) in two of the three Basque provinces: Guipuzcoa and Biscay, which were officially classified as "traitor regions". The fueros were kept in the other Basque provinces, Alava and Navarre, this last one also a former kingdom during the Middle Ages and the cradle of the Carlists, possibly due to the region's support during the Civil War.

Franco also used language politics in an attempt to establish national homogeneity. Despite Franco himself being a native Galician, the government revoked the official statute and recognition for the Basque, Galician and Catalan languages that the Republic had granted them, as well as other languages such as Asturleonese, Aragonese and Aranese (a dialect of Occitan spoken in the Val d'Aran). The former policy of promoting Spanish (Castilian) as the only official language of the state and education was resumed, even though millions of the country's citizens spoke also other languages. The legal usage of languages other than Spanish was forbidden: all government, notarial, legal and commercial documents were to be drawn up exclusively in Spanish and any written in other languages were deemed null and void. The use of any other language was forbidden in schools, advertising, religious ceremonies and on-road and shop signs. Publications in other languages were generally forbidden, though citizens continued to use them privately. During the late 1960s, these policies became more lenient yet non-Castilian languages continued to be discouraged and did not receive official status or legal recognition. Additionally, the popularisation of the compulsory national educational system and the development of modern mass media, both controlled by the state and exclusively in Spanish, reduced the competency of speakers of Basque, Catalan, Galician, Asturleonese, Aragonese and Aranese.

Franco also promoted the idea that Spaniards were not "European", or at the very least that they were distinct from the cultures of Mainland Europe. A state certified archeologist during the beginnings of the dictatorship was quoted as saying that Spain's "roots" were neither racially nor culturally European, that the culture "entered via the Pyrenees" (and had been rejected), and that Spaniards were "Berber" rather than "Alpine". These were also promoted in tourism during the 1950s and 1960s with the expression "Africa begins at the Pyrenees". Franco's Africanist view, while gradually becoming less prevalent, survived until the end of the regime.

==== Ultranationalism ====
Franco's nationalism is described as one of a radical degree, or as ultranationalism. According to Helen Graham, the radicalization of the Civil War transformed the Francoist military-conservative project into one based on modern ultranationalism. According to her, "ultranationalism based on integrist Catholicism and an anti-communist discourse functioned as the ideological glue binding together the victorious coalition and its social support base across Spain." Francisco Cobo Romero writes that, besides neutering left-wing advances by using an essentially antiliberal brand of ultranationalism, "in its attempt to emulate Fascism, Francoism resorted to the sacralization and mystification of the motherland, raising it into an object of cult, and coating it with a liturgic divinization of its leader".

=== National Catholicism ===
Franco's regime often used religion as a means to increase his popularity throughout the Catholic world, especially after the Second World War. Franco himself was increasingly portrayed as a fervent Catholic and a staunch defender of Roman Catholicism, the declared state religion. The regime favoured very conservative Roman Catholicism and reversed the secularisation process that had taken place under the Republic. As Julián Casanova notes, Fascism and Catholicism were "the two cornerstones" of the New State that emerged as the war progressed. According to historian Julian Casanova, "the symbiosis of religion, fatherland and Caudillo" saw the Church assume great political responsibilities, "a hegemony and monopoly beyond its wildest dreams" and it played "a central role in policing the country's citizens".

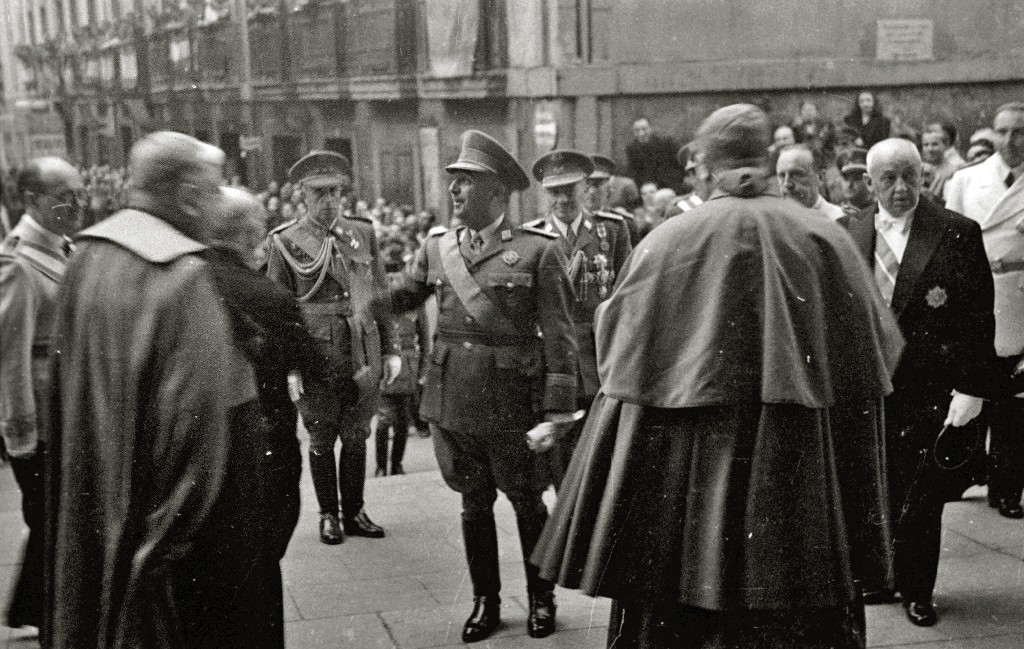
Franco with Catholic Church dignitaries in 1946

The Law of Political Responsibility of February 1939 turned the Church into an extralegal body of investigation as parishes were granted policing powers equal to those of local government officials and leaders of the Falange. Some official jobs required a "good behaviour" statement by a priest. According to historian Julian Casanova, "the reports that have survived reveal a clergy that was bitter because of the violent anti-clericalism and the unacceptable level of secularisation that Spanish society had reached during the republican years" and the law of 1939 made the priests investigators of peoples' ideological and political pasts.

The authorities encouraged denunciations in the workplace. For example, Barcelona's city hall obliged all government functionaries to "tell the proper authorities who the leftists are in your department and everything you know about their activities". A law passed in 1939 institutionalised the purging of public offices. The poet Carlos Barral recorded that in his family "any allusion to republican relatives was scrupulously avoided; everyone took part in the enthusiasm for the new era and wrapped themselves in the folds of religiosity". Only through silence could people associated with the Republic be relatively safe from imprisonment or unemployment. After the death of Franco, the price of the peaceful transition to democracy would be silence and "the tacit agreement to forget the past", which was given legal status by the 1977 Pact of Forgetting.

Civil marriages that had taken place in the Republic were declared null and void unless they had been validated by the Church, along with divorces. Divorce, contraception and abortions were forbidden. Children had to be given Christian names. Franco was made a member of the Supreme Order of Christ by Pope Pius XII whilst Spain itself was consecrated to the Sacred Heart.

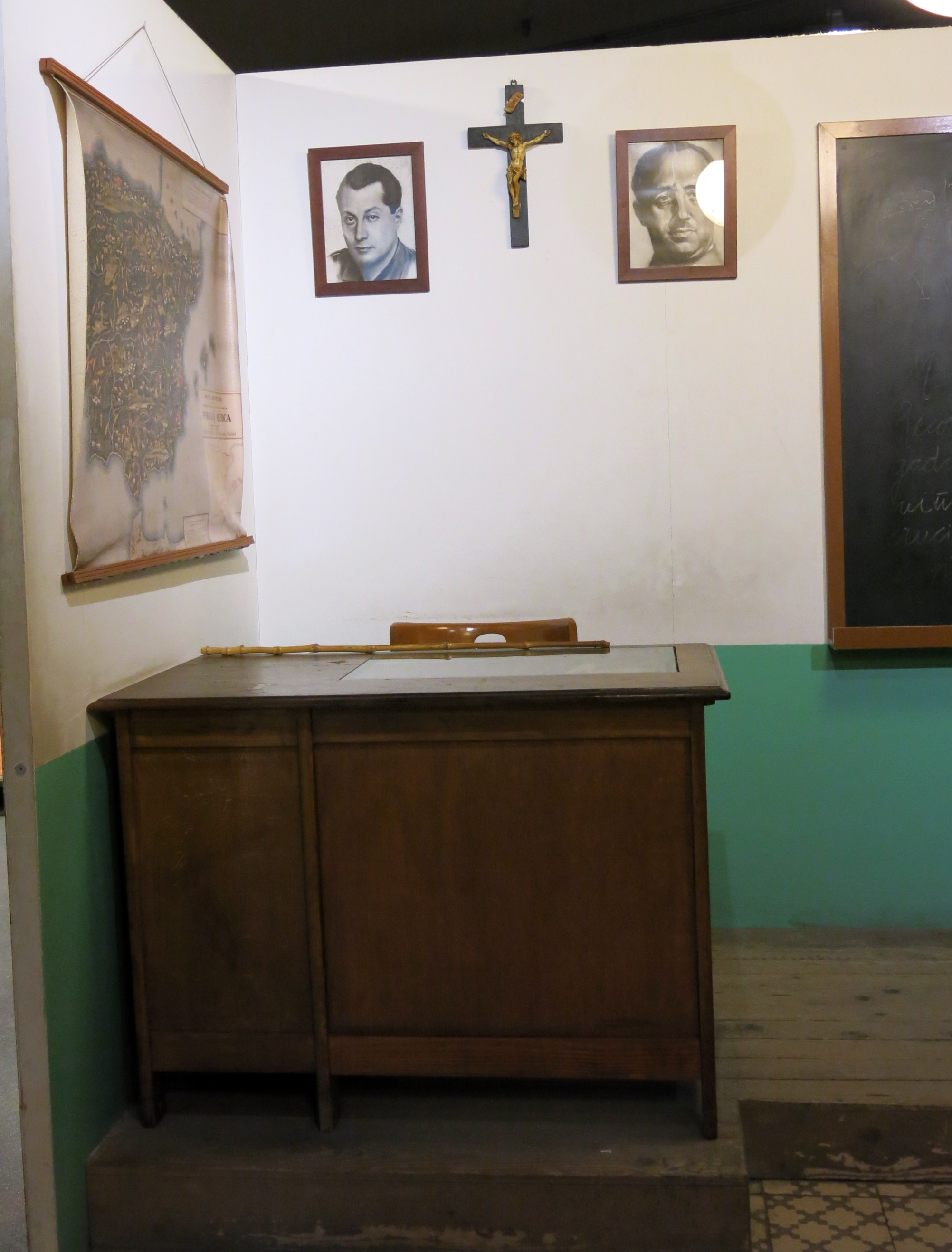
A recreation of a typical classroom from the Franco era, featuring a crucifix and portraits of Franco (on the right) and José Antonio Primo de Rivera (on the left). Taken at the Museum of the History of Catalonia.

The Catholic Church's ties with the Franco dictatorship gave it control over the country's schools and crucifixes were once again placed in schoolrooms. After the war, Franco chose José Ibáñez Martín, a member of the National Catholic Association of Propagandists, to lead the Ministry of Education. He held the post for 12 years, during which he finished the purging of the ministry begun by the Commission of Culture and Teaching headed by José María Pemán. Pemán led the Catholicizing of state-sponsored schools and allocated generous funding to the Church's schools. Romualdo de Toledo, head of the National Service of Primary Education, was a traditionalist who described the model school as "the monastery founded by Saint Benedict". The men in charge of the education system sanctioned and sacked thousands of teachers of the progressive left. In some provinces, like Lugo, practically all the teachers were dismissed. This process also affected tertiary education, as the ministers intended to ensure professorships only to the most faithful.

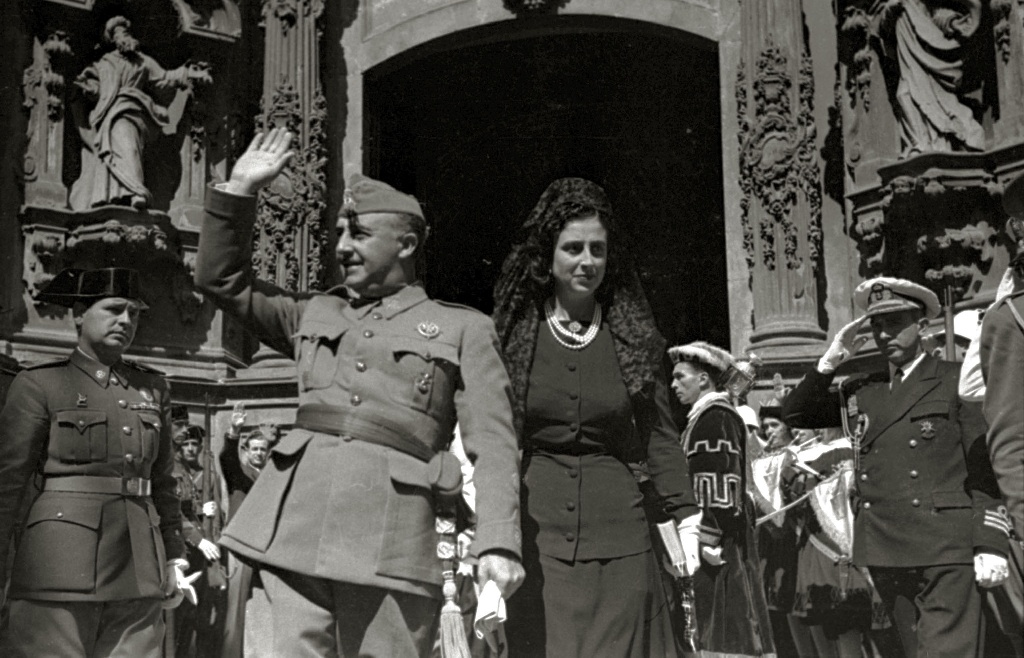
Franco visiting the Basilica of Saint Mary of the Chorus in San Sebastián

The orphaned children of "Reds" were taught in orphanages run by priests and nuns that "their parents had committed great sins that they could help expiate, for which many were incited to serve the Church".

Francoism professed a strong devotion to militarism, hypermasculinity and the traditional role of women in society. A woman was to be loving to her parents and brothers, faithful to her husband and to reside with her family. Official propaganda confined women's roles to family care and motherhood. Immediately after the civil war most progressive laws passed by the Republic aimed at equality between the sexes were nullified. Women could not become judges or testify in a trial. Their affairs and economic lives had to be managed by their fathers and husbands. In the 1960s and 1970s these restrictions were somewhat relaxed.

In 1947, Franco proclaimed Spain a monarchy through the Ley de Sucesión en la Jefatura del Estado act, but did not designate a monarch. He had no particular desire for a king because of his strained relations with the legitimist heir to the Crown, Juan of Bourbon. Therefore, he left the throne vacant with himself as regent and set the basis for his succession. This gesture was largely done to appease monarchist factions within the Movement. At the same time, Franco wore the uniform of a captain-general (a rank traditionally reserved for the King), resided in the Royal Palace of El Pardo, appropriated the kingly privilege of walking beneath a canopy and his portrait appeared on most Spanish coins. Indeed, although his formal titles were Jefe del Estado (Head of State) and Generalísimo de los Ejércitos Españoles (Generalissimo of the Spanish Armies), he was referred to as Caudillo of Spain, by the Grace of God. Por la Gracia de Dios is a technical, legal formulation which states sovereign dignity in absolute monarchies and had been used only by monarchs before.

Franco also received support from members of the Catholic resistance to Nazi Germany such as Otto von Habsburg and Clemens August Graf von Galen.

The long-delayed selection of Juan Carlos of Bourbon as Franco's official successor came in 1969, when the Cortes proclaimed him sucesor a título de Rey ("successor as King").

=== Role of women ===
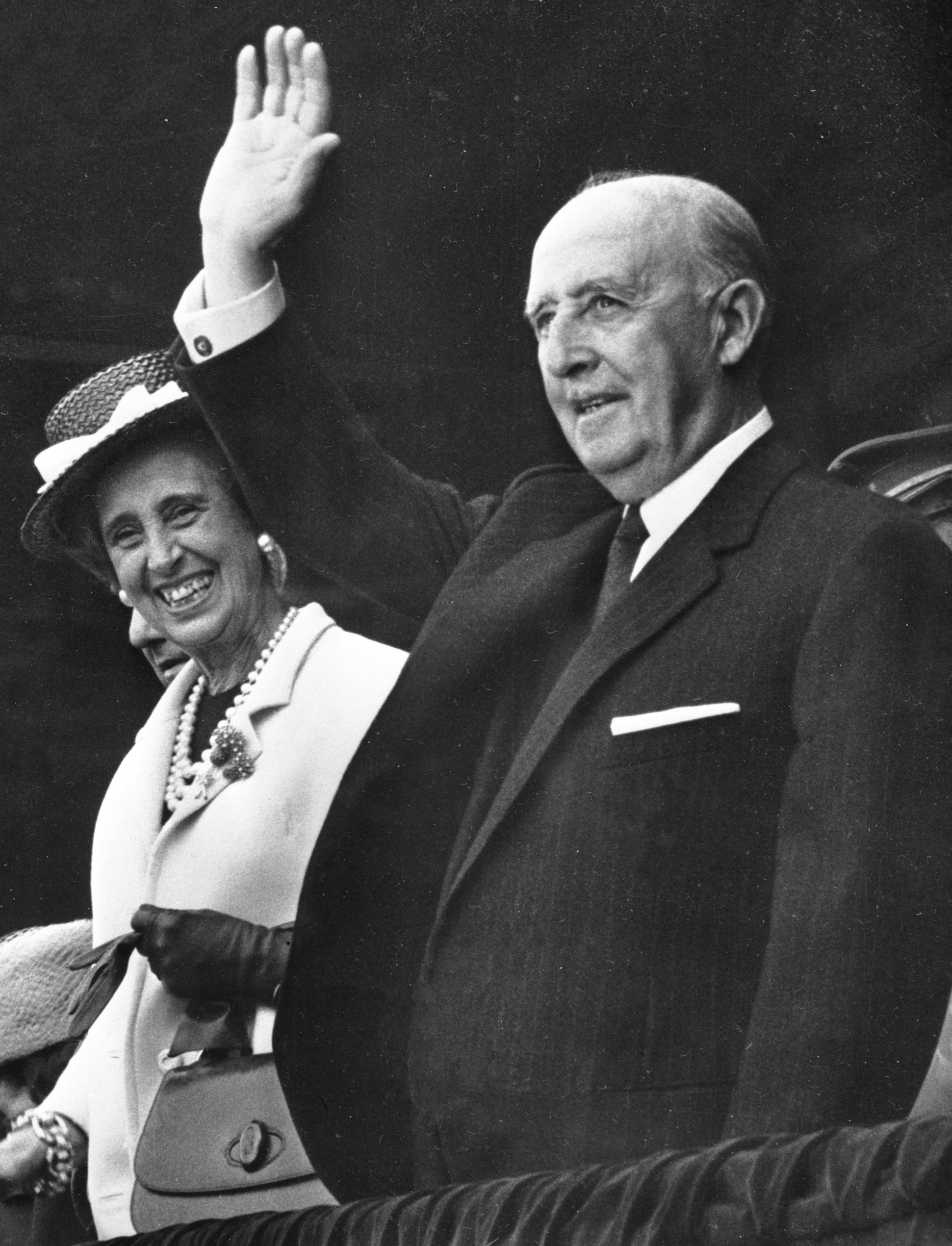
Franco and his wife, Carmen Polo, in 1968

Women had first been granted the right to vote in Spain during the Second Republic. Under the new constitution they had gained full legal status and equal access to the labor market, abortion had been legalized and the crime of adultery abolished.

The Franco regime's embrace of National Catholicism (nacionalcatolicismo) as part of its ideological identity meant that the Catholic Church, which traditionally supported the social subordination of women, had preeminence in all aspects of public and private life in Spain. The Catholic Church had a central role in upholding the traditional role of the family and women's place in it. Civil marriage had also been introduced in the country during the Republic, so the Church immediately asked the new Franco regime to restore its control of family and marriage laws. All Spanish women were required by the state to serve for six months in the Women's Section (Sección Femenina), the female branch of the Falange state party, to undergo training for motherhood along with political indoctrination.

Francoism professed a devotion to the traditional role of a woman in society; that is, being a loving daughter and sister to her parents and brothers, being a faithful wife to her husband, and residing with her family. Official propaganda confined the role of women to family care and motherhood. Immediately after the civil war most progressive laws passed by the Republic aimed at equality between the sexes were nullified. Women could not become judges or testify in a trial. Their affairs and economic lives had to be managed by their fathers and husbands. Until the 1970s, a woman could not open a bank account without having it co-signed by her father or husband. In the 1960s and 1970s these restrictions were somewhat relaxed.

However, from 1941 until well into the Spanish transition to democracy, the Women's Protection Board confined ten of thousands of girls and young women deemed 'fallen or at risk of falling', even without having committed any crime, in centers run by Catholic religious orders where they were routinely brutalized. They could be admitted to these centers starting at age 16 through police raids, for "immoral behavior," arbitrary reports from family members and individuals ("guardians of morals"), requests from civil and religious authorities, or at the request of the women themselves or their parents. In practice, girls as young as 11 were forcibly interned. Young women and girls were routinely trafficked to men and forced to bear children, only to have their babies stolen immediately afterwards.

=== Homophobia ===
Francoist Spain was strongly homophobic, criminalising and heavily suppressing homosexual activity. Homosexuality became punishable under the Penal Code of 1944 and was classified under the category of "public scandal, dishonest abuses, and crimes against honesty". In 1945, homosexuality in the Spanish Armed Forces became a criminal offence punishable by incarceration in a military prison for up to six years. In 1954, the Law of Vagrants and Thugs was revised to include homosexuality as one of the offences punishable under the law, prescribing a punishment of being sent to agricultural colonies or work camps for a period of three years. This law marked a shift in the homophobic regime's persecution of homosexuals from punishing specific homosexual acts to punishing individuals on the basis of their sexual orientation regardless of their actions, though it was later modified by the Special Tribunal of Appeals and Revisions to specifically target those who habitually engaged in homosexual activity. In spite of this persecution, an active, albeit clandestine, homosexual movement existed within Spain that maintained ties to queer communities in Latin America. During the latter years of Franco's rule, the influence of increasing consumerism helped to destabilise the sexual authoritarianism of the conservative Catholic dictatorship.

=== Influence abroad ===
Argentine General Juan Carlos Onganía modelled his short-lived military regime (1966–1970) after Francoist Spain. Across the Andes Francoism had an influence in Chile, where it found clear expressions in the military dictatorship era (1973–1990), in particular in the period prior to 1980. Chilean figures linked to Francoism include Traditionalist historian Jaime Eyzaguirre and lawyer Jaime Guzmán. Guzman's Guildist Movement, the Constitution of Chile of 1980, the political party Independent Democratic Union founded in 1983, the University of the Andes established in 1989 and the presence of Opus Dei in Chile represent a continuing Francoist heritage. In politics Francoist influence gave way to economic liberalism after 1980.

In the magazine Portada (1969–1976) Chilean traditionalist and conservative intellectuals repeatedly expressed sympathy for ideas associated with Francoism such as "organic democracy" rooted in Medieval institutions and "Hispanic conservatism".

== Narrative of the Civil War ==
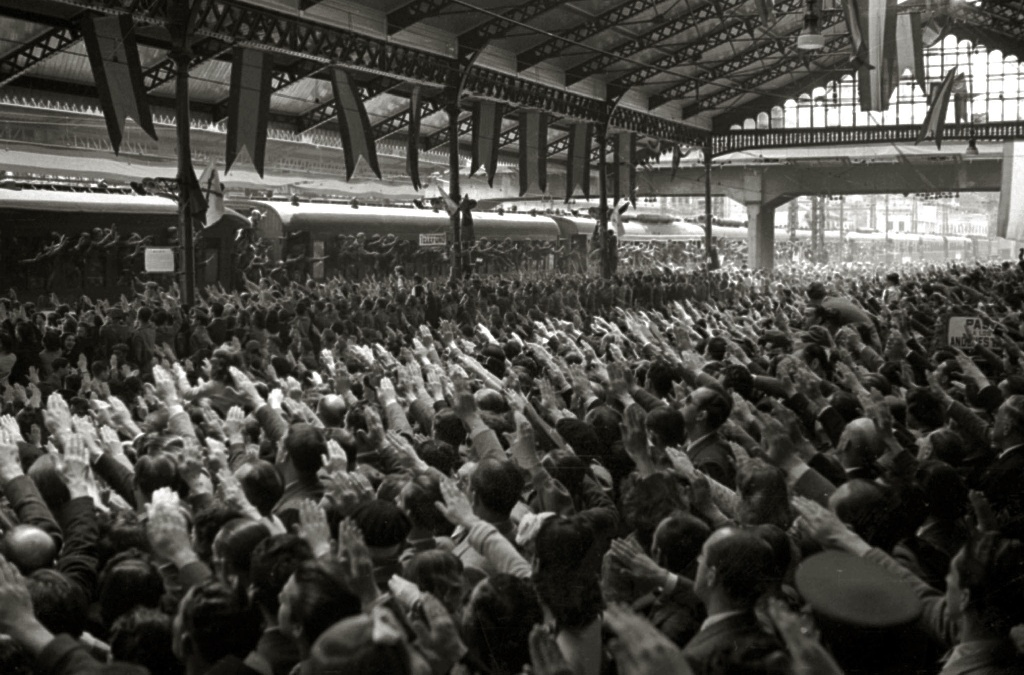
Spanish anti-communist volunteer forces of the Blue Division entrain at San Sebastián, 1942

For nearly twenty years after the war, Francoist Spain presented the conflict as a crusade against Bolshevism in defence of Christian civilization. In Francoist narrative, authoritarianism had defeated anarchy and overseen the elimination of "agitators", those "without God" and the "Judeo-Masonic conspiracy". Since Franco had relied on thousands of North African soldiers, anti-Islamic sentiment "was played down but the centuries-old myth of the Moorish threat lay at the base of the construction of the "communist menace" as a modern-day Eastern plague". The official position was therefore that the wartime Republic was simply a proto-Stalinist monolith, its leaders intent on creating a Spanish Soviet satellite. Many Spanish children grew up believing that the war had been fought against foreign enemies of Spain's historic greatness. About 6,832 Catholic clergy were murdered by the Republicans. Collectively, they are known as the martyrs of the Spanish Civil War.

== Media ==
Under the Press Law of 1938, Francoist Spain imposed prior censorship on publications. The regime also developed an extensive apparatus for supervising cinema, treating film as an instrument of propaganda and ideological control.

The regime's audiovisual propaganda included the No-Do newsreels, which were shown compulsorily in cinemas. In broadcasting, Radio Nacional de España was the only Spanish radio network authorized to broadcast news, while Televisión Española functioned as the state television service.

The Press and Print Law of 1966 abolished prior censorship, but it did not establish full freedom of the press; instead, important controls remained through sanctions, administrative pressure and self-censorship.

== Central administration ==
Spain—provincial and regional division in 1960

There were 119 individuals (plus Franco) holding ministerial jobs during the dictatorship. Most of the ministers came from Madrid, and in proportion to the entire population New Castile (of which Madrid formed part administrationwise) was heavily overrepresented. Other overrepresented regions were (sequentially) Navarre, Vasconia, Asturias, Galicia and Aragon; the most underrepresented regions were (also sequentially) Baleares, Murcia, Extremadura, and Valencia. In terms of jobs, most ministers (32) were professional specialists (engineers, doctors, lawyers), followed by military men (26), businessmen (14) and state employees (10). Some 71% held a university degree, and 28% graduated from military academies. Members of nobility formed some 6%, the lowest level in Spain until then. Only 9% had earlier parliamentary experience, the lowest level until transition to democracy. When assuming office, 41% were aged 40–49, 28% were aged 50–59, 24% were 60 or above and 7% were below 40. Some 36% held the office between 1 and 4 years, 29% between 4 and 8 years, and 23% longer than 8 years, with the average far ahead of this for any of the previous periods. The Franco period marked also the lowest-ever (including post-1978 era) mobility across portfolios, as 85% of ministers held only one.

The longest-serving individuals and the longest ministerial spells are as below:

Name	Ministry	From	To	Duration (days)	Duration (years)	Other ministerial spells (caretaker excluded)	Total (days)	Total (years)
José Antonio Girón de Velasco	Labour	1941-05-20	1957-02-25	5760	15.8	None	5760	15.8
Raimundo Fernández-Cuesta Merelo	Movimiento	1948-11-05	1956-02-15	2658	7.3	Agriculture (38–39), justice (45–51)	5405	14.8
Blas Pérez González	Interior	1942-09-09	1957-02-25	5283	14.5	None	5283	14.5
Antonio Iturmendi Bañales	Justice	1951-07-18	1965-07-07	5103	14.0	None	5103	14.0
José Solís Ruiz	Movimiento	1957-02-25	1969-10-29	4629	12.7	Movimiento (1975)	4789	13.1
Camilo Alonso Vega	Interior	1957-02-25	1969-10-29	4629	12.7	None	4629	12.7
Fernando Ma. Castiella y Maiz	Foreign affairs	1957-02-25	1969-10-29	4629	12.7	None	4629	12.7
Joaquín Benjumea Burín	Finance	1941-05-20	1951-08-18	3742	10.3	Agriculture (39–41)	4391	12.0
José Ibáñez Martín	Education	1939-08-09	1951-07-19	4362	12.0	None	4362	12.0
Eduardo González-Gallarza Iragorri	Aviation (military branch)	1945-07-18	1957-02-25	4240	11.6	None	4240	11.6
Alberto Martín-Artajo Álvarez	Foreign affairs	1945-07-20	1957-02-25	4238	11.6	None	4238	11.6
Salvador Moreno Fernández	Navy	1939-08-09	1945-07-20	2170	5.9	Navy (51–57)	4216	11.6
Joaquín Planell Riera	Industry	1951-07-15	1962-07-10	4013	11.0	None	4013	11.0
Gabriel Arias-Salgado y de Cubas	Information	1951-07-19	1962-07-11	4010	11.0	None	4010	11.0

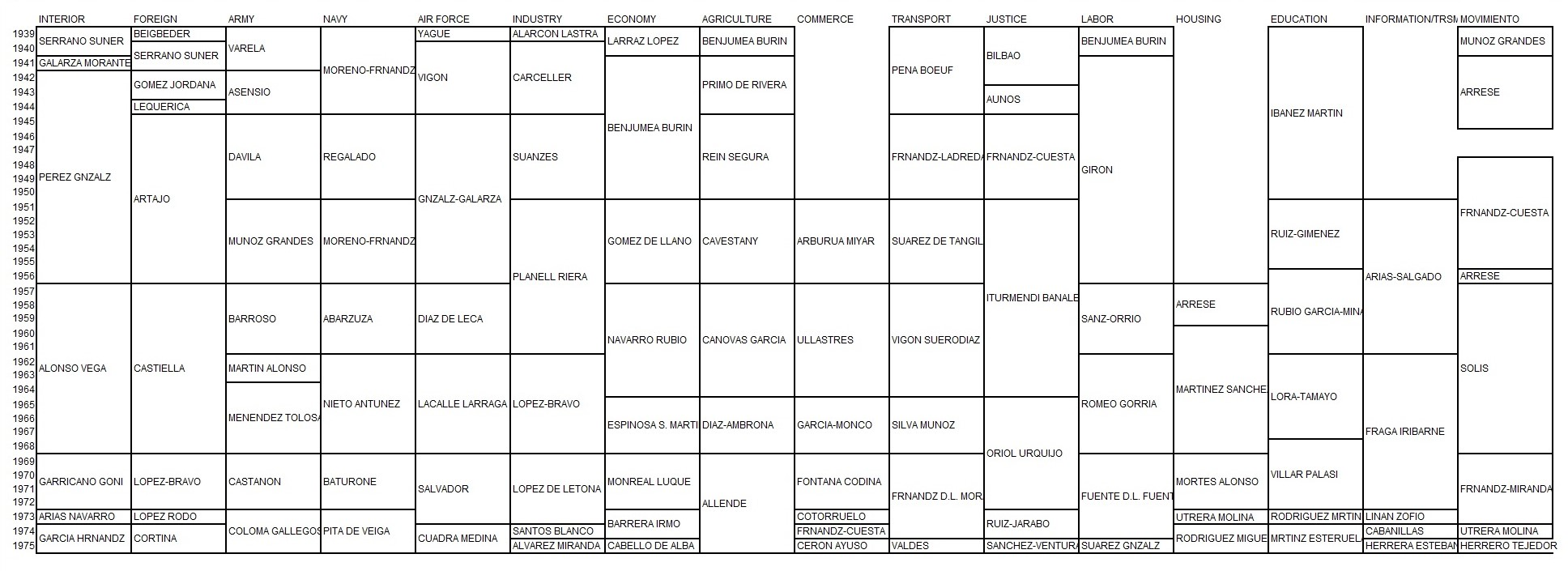
ministers of Francoist Spain (early 1939 excluded)

== Economy ==
The Civil War had ravaged the Spanish economy. Infrastructure had been damaged, workers killed and daily business severely hampered. For more than a decade after Franco's victory, the economy improved little. Franco initially pursued a policy of fascist-style autarky similar to the Italian and German models, resulting in almost all international trade and essential aid being cut off. The policy had devastating effects and was a major contributing factor in the devastation and stagnation of the Spanish economy, alongside a famine that killed over 200,000 people. Only black marketeers could enjoy an evident affluence.

In 1940, the Sindicato Vertical was created. It was inspired by the ideas of José Antonio Primo de Rivera, who thought that class struggle would be ended by grouping together workers and owners according to corporative principles. It was the only legal trade union and was under government control. Other trade unions were forbidden and strongly repressed along with political parties outside the Falange.

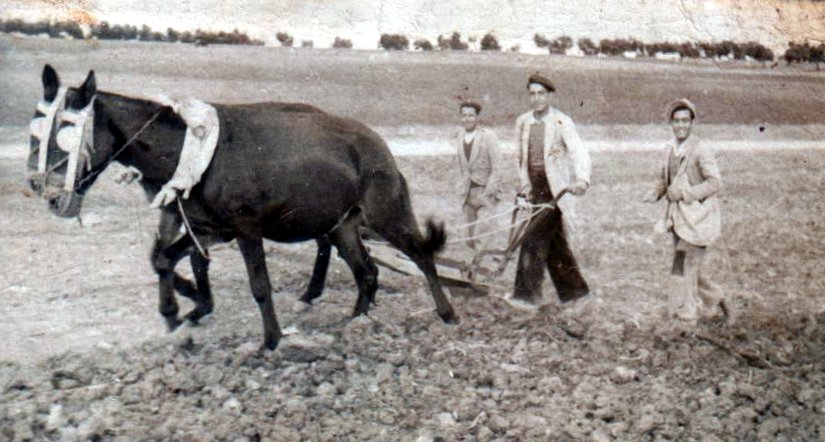
Image of a plow in 1950 in El Saucejo, province of Seville. During the 1940s, Spanish agriculture was characterized by low productivity and limited technological development.

The Francoist agrarian colonisation was one of the most ambitious programs related to the regime's agrarian policies, which were an answer to the Republic's Law of Agrarian Reform and the war-time collectivizations. Somewhat inspired by the brief points related to agrarian policy of FE de las JONS, the Francoist colonisation underpinned a materialisation of the agrarian policies vowed by Fascism (connected to the Italian Bonifica integrale or the agrarian policy elements of the Nazi Generalplan Ost). The policy was carried out by the Instituto Nacional de Colonización (INC), created in 1939 with the goal of agricultural modernisation by means of the creation of irrigated lands, improvements in agrarian technology and training and the installment of settlers. It consolidated the privileges of the landowning classes, protecting to a large extent the large landowners from potential expropriations (tierras reservadas where large landowners owners retained land property and were transformed into irrigated lands with help from the INC vs the comparatively smaller tierras en exceso, purchased or expropriated and where settlers installed). While its inception dates to the period of hegemony of Fascist powers in Europe, the plan did not fully take off until the 1950s. From 1940 to 1970 around 300 colonisation settlements were created.

On the brink of bankruptcy, a combination of pressure from the United States (including about $1.5 billion in aid 1954–1964), the IMF and technocrats from Opus Dei managed to "convince" the regime to liberalize the economy in 1959 in what amounted to a mini coup d'état which removed the old guard in charge of the economy, despite the opposition of Franco. However, this economic liberalisation was not accompanied by political reforms and oppression continued unabated.

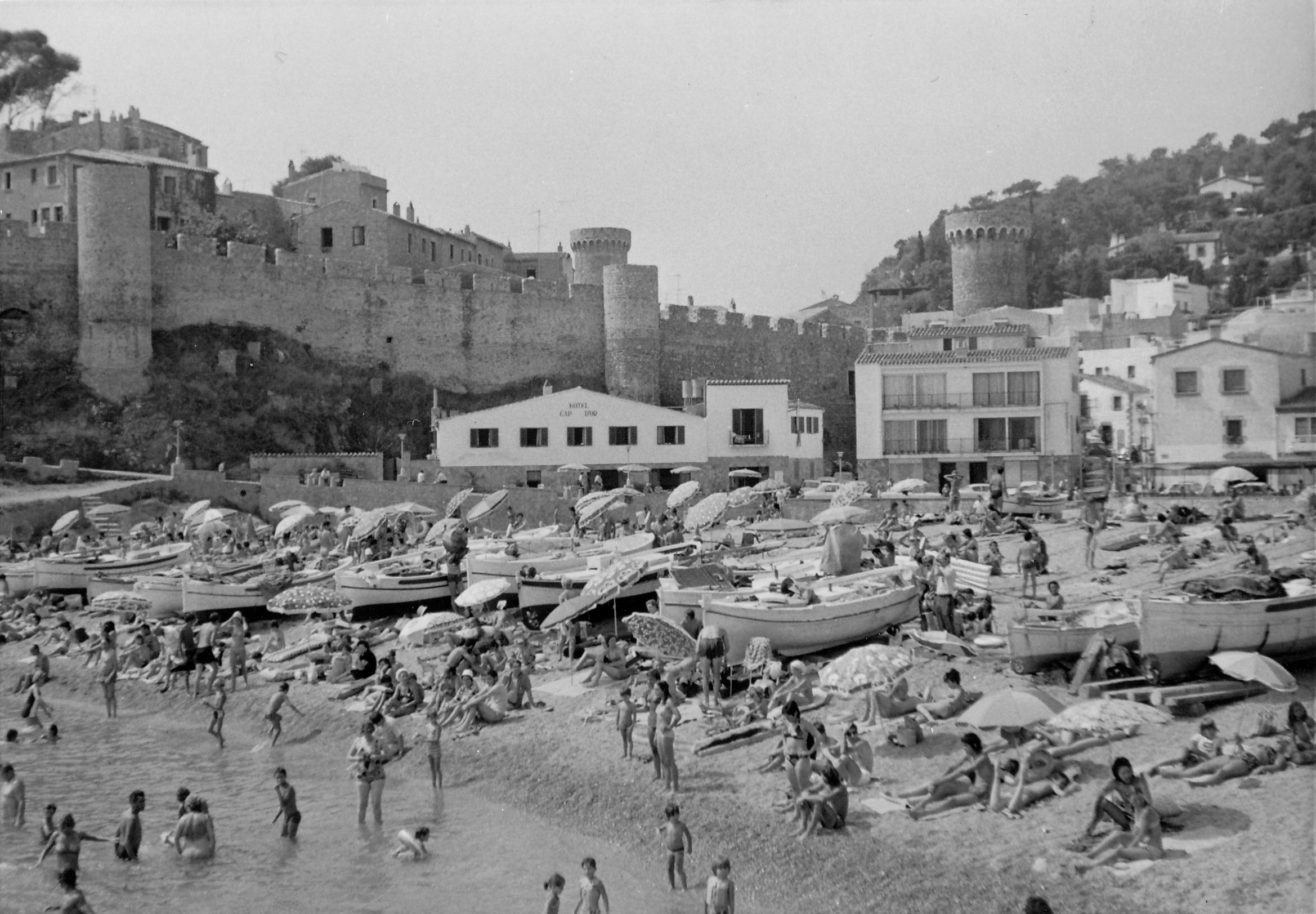
Platja Gran in Tossa de Mar, Catalonia in 1974. Tourism was one of the keys to the Spanish economic miracle.

Economic growth picked up after 1959 after Franco took authority away from these ideologues and gave more power to the liberal technocrats. The country implemented several development policies and growth took off, creating the "Spanish Miracle". Concurrent with the absence of social reforms and the economic power shift, a tide of mass emigration commenced to European countries and to a lesser extent to South America. Emigration helped the regime in two ways: the country got rid of surplus population and the emigrants supplied the country with much needed monetary remittances.

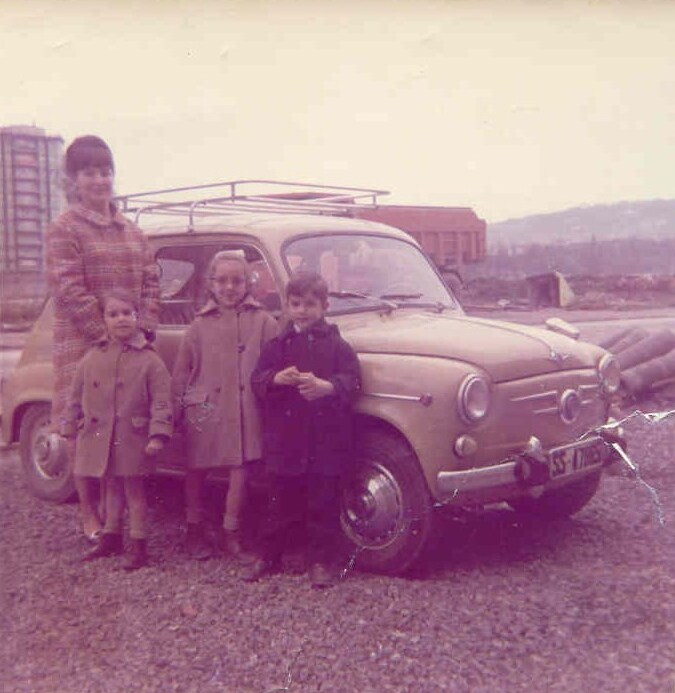
A mother with her three children stands next to her SEAT 600 in San Sebastián, in the mid-1960s. The SEAT 600 became a symbol of Spain's emerging mass consumer society.

During the 1960s, Spain experienced further increases in wealth. International firms established their factories in Spain. Spain became the second-fastest-growing economy in the world, alongside Brazil and just behind Japan. The rapid development of this period became known as the "Spanish Miracle". At the time of Franco's death, Spain still lagged behind most of Western Europe, but the gap between its GDP per capita and that of the major Western European economies had greatly narrowed. In world terms, Spain was already enjoying a fairly high material standard of living with basic but comprehensive services. However, the period between the mid-1970s and mid-1980s proved difficult, as Spain was hit by the oil shocks and by the political and institutional instability associated with the transition to democracy.

Growth of GDP and its components, 1935–1974
Period	Real GDP growth	Real GDP per capita	Population
1935–1939	−6.6	−6.9	0.4
1939–1944	4.9	4.8	0.1
1944–1950	0.2	−1.0	1.2
1950–1958	5.8	5.0	0.8
1958–1974	6.5	5.5	1.1

== Legacy ==
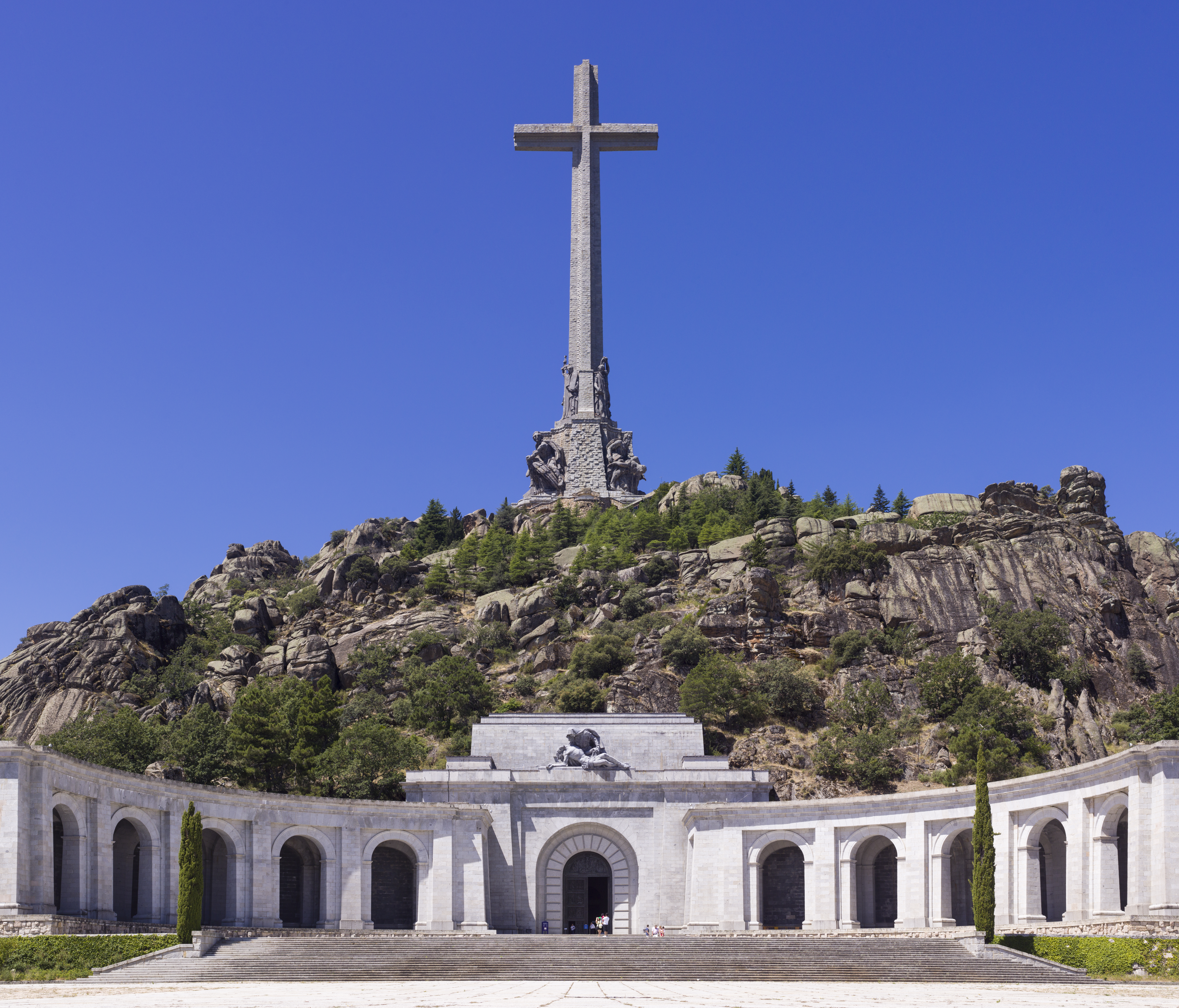
By the decision of King Juan Carlos I, Franco was entombed in the monument of Valle de los Caídos, until his body was moved in October 2019.

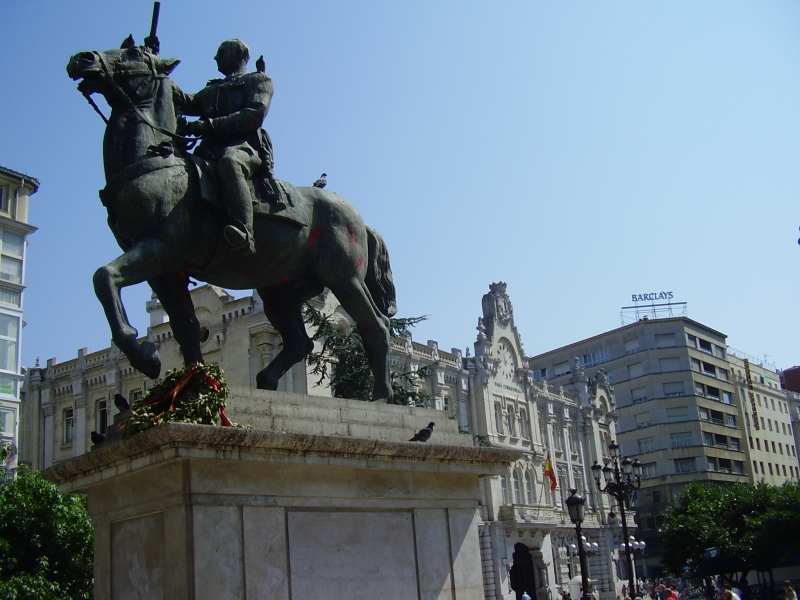
Equestrian statue of Franco in the Plaza del Ayuntamiento of Santander, taken down in late 2008

In Spain and abroad, the legacy of Franco remains controversial. In Germany, a squadron named after Werner Mölders has been renamed because as a pilot he led the escorting units in the bombing of Guernica. As recently as 2006, the BBC reported that Maciej Giertych, an MEP of the right-wing League of Polish Families, had expressed admiration for Franco's stature who he believed had "guaranteed the maintenance of traditional values in Europe".

Spanish opinion has changed. Most statues of Franco and other public Francoist symbols have been removed, and the last Franco statue in Madrid came down in 2005. Additionally, in March 2006, the Permanent Commission of the European Parliament unanimously adopted a resolution "firmly" condemning the "multiple and serious violations" of human rights committed in Spain under the Francoist regime from 1939 to 1975. The resolution was at the initiative of the MEP Leo Brincat and of the historian Luis María de Puig and is the first international official condemnation of the repression enacted by Franco's regime. The resolution also urged to provide public access to historians (professional and amateurs) to the various archives of the Francoist regime, including those of the Fundación Francisco Franco, which as well as other Francoist archives remain as of 2006 inaccessible to the public. Furthermore, it urged the Spanish authorities to set up an underground exhibition in the Valley of the Fallen in order to explain the terrible conditions in which it was built. Finally, it proposed the construction of monuments to commemorate Franco's victims in Madrid and other important cities.

In Spain, a commission to restore the dignity of the victims of Franco's regime and pay tribute to their memory (comisión para reparar la dignidad y restituir la memoria de las víctimas del franquismo) was approved in the summer of 2004 and was directed by the then-Vice President María Teresa Fernández de la Vega. Because the Franco dictatorship repressed regional languages and national cultures, Franco's legacy remains especially controversial in Catalonia and the Basque Country. The Basque Provinces and Catalonia were among the regions that offered the strongest resistance to Franco in the Civil War, as well as during his regime.

In 2008, the Association for the Recovery of Historical Memory initiated a systematic search for mass graves of people executed during Franco's regime, a move supported since the Spanish Socialist Workers' Party's victory during the 2004 elections by José Luis Rodríguez Zapatero's government. The Historical Memory Law (Ley de Memoria Histórica) was passed in 2007 as an attempt to enforce official recognition of the crimes committed against civilians during Franco's rule and to organise under state supervision the search for mass graves.

Investigations have begun into wide-scale child abduction during the Franco years. The number of lost children of Francoism may have reached 300,000.

== Flags and heraldry ==
=== Flags ===
At the conclusion of the Spanish Civil War and in spite of the army's reorganisation, several sections of the army continued with their bi-colour flags improvised in 1936, but since 1938 new ensigns began to be distributed, whose main innovation was the addition of the eagle of Saint John to the shield. The new arms were allegedly inspired in the coat of arms the Catholic Monarchs adopted after the taking of Emirate of Granada from the Moors, but replacing the arms of Sicily with those of Navarre and adding the Pillars of Hercules on either side of the coat of arms. In 1938, the columns were placed outside the wings. On 26 July 1945, the commander's ensigns were suppressed by decree and on 11 October a detailed regulation of flags was published that fixed the model of the bi-colour flag in use, but better defined its details, emphasising a greater style of the Saint John's eagle. The models established by this decree remained in force until 1977.

During this period, two more flags were usually displayed along with the national flag: the flag of Falange (red, black and red vertical stripes, with the yokes and arrows in the centre of the black stripe) and the traditionalist flag (white background with the Cross of Burgundy in the middle), representing the National Movement which had unified Falange and the Requetés under the name Falange Española Tradicionalista y de las JONS.

From the death of Franco in 1975 until 1977, the national flag followed the 1945 regulations. On 21 January 1977, a new regulation was approved that stipulated an eagle with more open wings, with the restored Pillars of Hercules placed within the wings and the tape with the motto "Una, Grande y Libre" ("One, Great and Free") moved over the eagle's head from its previous position around the neck.

State flags

State flag (July 17, 1936 – August 29, 1936)

State flag (August 30, 1936 – 1938)

State flag (1938–1945)

State flag (1945–1977)

Civil flag (1936–1975)
Party flags

Flag of the Falange Movement

Flag of the Traditionalist Movement (Carlism)

=== Standards ===
From 1940 to 1975, Franco used the Royal Bend of Castile as Head of State's standard and guidon: the Bend between the Pillars of Hercules, crowned with an imperial crown and open royal crown.

As Prince of Spain from 1969 to 1975, Juan Carlos used a royal standard which was virtually identical to the one later adopted when he became King in 1975. The earlier standard differed only that it featured the royal crown of a Crown Prince, the King's royal crown has 8 arches of which 5 are visible, while the Prince's one has only 4 arches of which 3 are visible. The Royal Standard of Spain consists of a dark blue square with the coat of arms in the centre. The King's guidon is identical to the standard.

Standard of Francisco Franco (1940–1975)

Royal standard of the Prince of Spain (1969–1975)

=== Coat of arms ===
In 1938, Franco adopted a variant of the coat of arms reinstating some elements originally used by the House of Trastámara such as Saint John's eagle and the yoke and arrows as follows: "Quarterly, 1 and 4. quarterly Castile and León, 2 and 3. per pale Aragon and Navarra, enté en point of Granada. The arms are crowned with an open royal crown, placed on eagle displayed sable, surrounded with the pillars of Hercules, the yoke and the bundle of arrows of the Catholic Monarchs".

State Coat of arms

Coat of arms (1936–1938)

Coat of arms (1938–1945)

Simplified version used on stamps, lottery tickets, identity documents, and buildings (1938–1945)

Coat of arms (1945–1977)
Personal Coat of arms

Coat of arms of Francisco Franco (1940–1975)

Coat of arms of the Prince of Spain (1969–1975)

== See also ==
- Art and culture in Francoist Spain
- European interwar dictatorships
- Dates of establishment of diplomatic relations with Francoist Spain
- New Order (Indonesia)
- Francoist Catalonia
- Francoist concentration camps
- Government-in-exile of José Giral
- Instituto Nacional de Colonización
- Language policies of Francoist Spain
- List of people executed by Francoist Spain
- Nationalist foreign volunteers
- Pact of Forgetting
- Sociological Francoism
- Spanish question (United Nations)
- Spanish Republican exiles
- Spanish Republican government in exile
- White Terror (Spain)
