= 1939 Madrid Victory Parade =

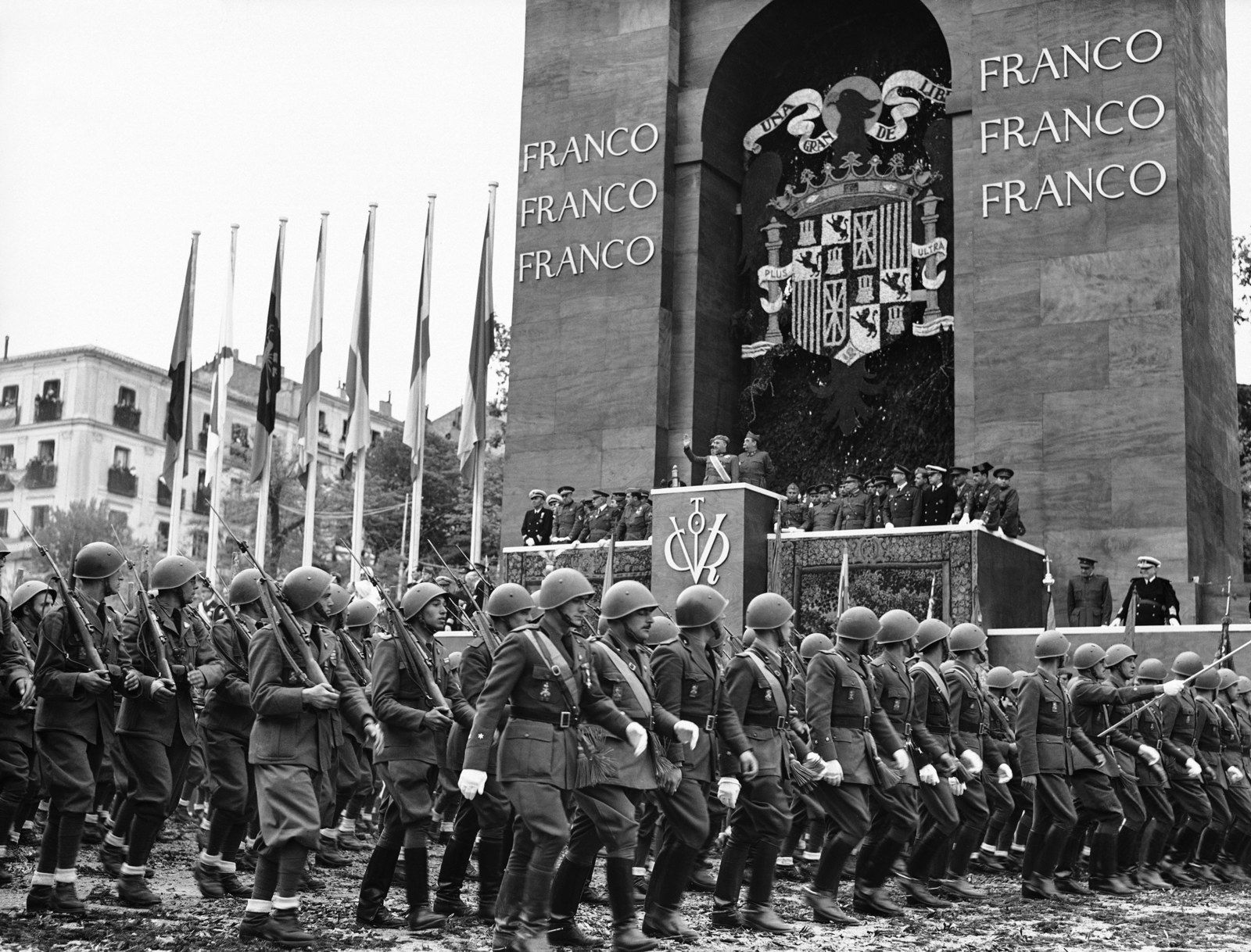
Victory Parade in Madrid.

The 1939 Madrid Victory Parade (Spanish: desfile de la Victoria de Madrid de 1939) was held in Madrid on 19 May 1939, over a month after the victory of the Nationalists in the Spanish Civil War (1936–1939). It was the climax of a series of parades held in various Spanish capitals. It was also the first of a yearly series, named Día de la Victoria (Victory Day), held on 1 April until 1976, the year after Francisco Franco's death. The parade, along with a church ceremony at Santa Bárbara on the following day, aimed to underscore the enduring nature of Franco's headship of the state during the conflict and to solidify his role as the victorious "Caudillo" to the nation.

== Preparations ==
After the conclusion of the Spanish Civil War, the Franco regime began preparations for a display of power in Madrid, a city that had withstood a siege by the victors for nearly three years. Within a few weeks of Madrid's capitulation on April 14, the specific units that would participate in the parade were determined. The Madrid parade was to be the final event in a series that had previously taken place in various locations across Spain, including the Andalusian capitals and Valencia. In the spring, Franco embarked on what would be the first of his tours through the Spanish provinces. This tour had the dual purpose of establishing contact with the population and affirming his leadership.

In preparation for the parade, extensive arrangements were made throughout the city. The Chamber of Commerce mandated that shop windows should display portraits of Franco and posters with slogans such as "Franco, Franco, Franco, Up Spain," "Glory to the Caudillo," "Spain, One, Great and Free," and "For the Homeland, Bread and Justice." The exteriors of cinemas, theaters, department stores, and cafes were adorned with photographs of Franco and José Antonio, alongside flags of Spain and the Movement. To facilitate these decorations, the army provided 20,000 meters of red and yellow hangings and approximately one hundred thousand flags at cost price.

Additionally, the population was encouraged to host the parade's leaders and officers in their homes. Due to a lack of sufficient voluntary offers, a mandatory accommodation scheme was implemented on May 9, as the event held official status.

A designated route was established for the parade, spanning Paseo del Prado and continuing along Recoletos and Castellana, which were renamed Paseo de Calvo Sotelo and Avenida del Generalísimo, respectively. The procession concluded at Plaza de Cánovas del Castillo. A tribune, designed in the form of a triumphal arch, was positioned on the right side of the final stretch of the route, between the streets of Lista (currently Ortega y Gasset) and Marqués de Villamagna (where the Hotel Villamagna now stands). This arch was adorned with a tapestry featuring the Eagle of Saint John, and the word "VICTORY" was prominently displayed above the arch. The pillars of the arch each bore the inscription "FRANCO" three times, echoing the repetitive style of the fascist motto "Duce, Duce, Duce," though it may also draw parallels to the liturgical phrase "Holy, Holy, Holy." Beneath the arch was a specially constructed box with a balcony, decorated at the front with a figure of a victor, from which Franco was to appear. Additional architectural features included a double colonnade erected in Plaza de Colón and a bridge in Plaza de Cibeles.

The day before the parade, Falangist writer Ernesto Giménez Caballero delivered a speech on the National Radio of Spain, asserting, "The war is not over. The war continues. Still silent: in front of invisible white. And a war as relentless as the one our bodies and our viscera suffered until April 1. It's the same war, it's the same enemies. It is the same scoundrel that will not resign itself until its definitive, historic crushing." That same day, General Francisco Franco arrived in Madrid from Burgos, where the government was still situated, and made a ceremonial entry through the decorated streets of the capital. The press office in Burgos had previously stated that "the entry of General Franco into Madrid will follow the ritual observed when Alfonso VI, accompanied by the Cid, took Toledo in the Middle Ages." The Marchioness of Argüelles offered him the Palacio de la Huerta on Serrano Street for his stay; this location is currently the site of the American embassy in Spain.

The parade was commanded by General Andrés Saliquet, Commander of the Madrid Military Region, and was presided by the Franco.

More than 120,000 men and 1,000 vehicles took part in the parade, including small contingents of the German Condor Legion, the Italian Corpo Truppe Volontarie and the Portuguese Viriatos. The forces went along Paseo de la Castellana, the main Madrid avenue, in a North to South direction and in total spent around 4 hours in marching past the full path. Around 400,000 people attended the event.

The environment was spectacularly fitted out with countless patriotic, triumphal and Franco's Cult of personality slogans.

== The Parade ==
May 19 was designated as "Victory Day," a public holiday to facilitate attendance at the parade. By six in the morning, approximately 400,000 individuals had already gathered along the parade route. The Retiro Park, which had been closed to the public since the end of the war, was reopened for the occasion. The Metro line 2, running between Sol and Cuatro Caminos, was closed until three in the afternoon to accommodate the event. Throughout the city center, members of the Women's Section moved through the crowd, selling copies of their magazine, Y (an archaic initial of Isabel la Católica), while members from the Movement distributed a special issue of the newspaper Arriba.

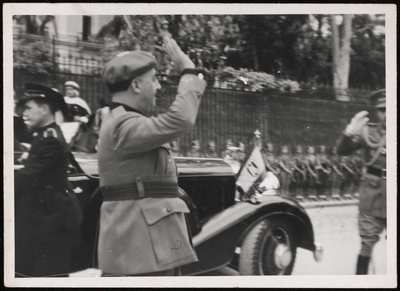
Dictator Franco arrives at the Madrid Víctory Parade and salutes de troops.

At nine in the morning, the Generalissimo, Francisco Franco, took his position on the platform beneath the triumphal arch. He arrived in an open Hispano-Suiza J12 convertible with a Vanvooren body and armored protection, accompanied by General Saliquet, chief of the Army of the Center. Franco was dressed in a military uniform, which included the Falangist blue shirt and the red beret associated with the Carlists. Present on the platform were the full government, army generals and chiefs, and about thirty laureate knights, military personnel who had been awarded the Laureate Cross of San Fernando.

The ceremony commenced with General Franco being awarded the Grand Laureate Cross of San Fernando, Spain's highest military decoration. This honor, established during the War of Independence, could only be bestowed by the king or, in his absence, the individual exercising executive power. The decoration ceremony was led by General Gómez Jordana, the Vice President of the Government and Minister of Foreign Affairs, who read the decree granting the decoration. General Varela, himself a recipient of two laureate crosses, then presented the decoration to Franco "in the name of the Homeland." The proposal to award this decoration had been initiated by several city councils, including Madrid, and was also supported by the exiled King Alfonso. Shortly thereafter, Cardinal Isidro Gomá, the primate of Spain, joined the dignitaries on the platform.

Historical accounts vary, but estimates of the number of troops who participated in the parade range from 120,000 to 250,000. These troops represented the majority of units that had fought in the war, including foreign contingents that had supported Franco during the civil conflict, such as the Portuguese Viriatos, the Italian Corpo di Truppe Volontarie, and the German Condor Legion. At the base of the platform, on a small dais, various historical banners were displayed, with the Valencian Royal Senyera positioned at the center. These flags were carried by army ensigns. Civil guards and members of the Khalifa's guard were tasked with guarding the dais.

General Saliquet initially led the parade before joining the rest of the authorities on the platform. Following him were the troops of the Italian Corpo Truppe Volontarie, commanded by General Gambara. This contingent included a band of Carabinieri, a squad of Blackshirts performing a Roman salute with daggers raised, and mechanized and cavalry units. The Falangist militias, including the requetés who carried large crucifixes, as well as troops from the Legion, Moroccan mercenaries, and a unit of Andalusian gentlemen on horseback, also participated. Generals García Valiño and Solchaga led their respective troops. All units displayed the battle-worn banners they had carried during the war.

The parade concluded with the Portuguese Viriatos and the German Condor Legion, under the command of General Wolfram von Richthofen. The parade lasted approximately five hours and involved significant economic expenditure, including 115 infantry units, 200 artillery batteries, 25 anti-tank guns, 20 anti-aircraft batteries, 27 cavalry squadrons, two anti-aircraft machine gun companies, 150 battle tanks, 500 motorcycles, and 3,000 cars and trucks. If arranged linearly, these forces would have extended over 25 kilometers. General Varela was positioned to the right of Franco, with Saliquet to the left. Additionally, a squadron of 62 biplanes participated, forming the words "Viva Franco" in the sky, alongside another airplane that wrote the Generalissimo's name with smoke. Despite rain falling around midday for about an hour, the parade continued without interruption.

After the parade, a banquet was held at the Palacio Real. Later, General Francisco Franco delivered a radio address to the nation, in which he issued a stern warning against "certain nations," notably France and the United Kingdom, cautioning them against using economic pressures to influence the policies of the new Spanish State. In his speech, Franco expressed his commitment to suppress the political factions that had been defeated in the civil war and to remain vigilant against what he described as "the Jewish spirit that allowed the alliance of big capital with Marxism." He also attributed the "martyrdom of Madrid" during the war to the actions of the defeated parties.

In the afternoon, Franco attended a performance of the zarzuela "Doña Francisquita" at the Calderón Theater. Additionally, a bullfighting event was organized by the Provincial Council at Las Ventas, featuring renowned matadors such as Marcial Lalanda, Vicente Barrera, Domingo Ortega, Antonio Cañero, Pepe Amorós, Pepe Bienvenida, and "El Estudiante."

== The Ceremony of the Church of Santa Barbara: the Offering of the Sword of Victory ==
The celebrations continued the following day with a symbolic religious ceremony held at the Church of Santa Bárbara in the capital. The ceremony was presided over by Cardinal Isidro Gomá, the Primate of Spain, and attended by twenty other bishops. During the ceremony, the dictator presented the "Sword of Victory over the Infidels," a ritual historically performed by the kings of Castile. In a highly symbolic gesture, Franco entered the church under a canopy, a liturgical privilege traditionally reserved for Spanish monarchs. He was greeted by the choir from the Monastery of Santo Domingo de Silos, which performed a Mozarabic chant from the tenth century, typically reserved for the reception of princes.

Various relics present during the ceremony evoked the memory of past Spanish leaders such as Don Pelayo, the Great Captain, and Juan de Austria. After the Te Deum and the pontifical Mass, a ceremony reminiscent of a coronation took place, featuring the anointing of the Caudillo and the acknowledgment of the "providential" nature of his leadership. Generalísimo Franco then recited the following prayer:

Lord God, in whose hands are right and all power, lend me your assistance to lead this people to full freedom from the empire, for the glory of you and the Church. Lord: may all men know Jesus, who is Christ, Son of the living God.

The sword of victory was placed on the main altar in front of the Christ of Lepanto, which had been specially transported from Barcelona for the occasion. Subsequently, it was displayed in the Cathedral of Toledo. That same afternoon, the Head of State met with the diplomatic corps at the Monastery of El Escorial. The selection of rituals and venues was designed to draw parallels between Franco's recent "Liberation Crusade" and the historical conflicts fought by Hispanic Christians against Muslims. This symbolism was also reflective of Franco's intention to maintain his hold on power.

== Evolution and decline of the Victory Parade ==
Beginning in 1940, the Victory Parade was annually held on April 1, designated as "Victory Day," and continued without interruption until 1976. In 1964, the event was renamed the "Peace Parade" to commemorate the 25th anniversary of peace in Spain. Originally established as a national holiday, Victory Day eventually lost this designation. To avoid inclement weather, the event was later moved to one of the Sundays in May.

After the death of Francisco Franco, the 1976 parade took place on May 30. Although there was an initial government attempt to change its name, resistance from the General Captaincy of Madrid prevented this. In 1977, the parade was officially renamed and subsequently known as the "Day of the Armed Forces" parade. This military parade, which evolved from the Victory Parade, was traditionally held at the end of May each year. For several years, the location of the parade rotated among the various General Captaincies. Eventually, under the government of José Luis Rodríguez Zapatero, the celebration of Armed Forces Day was restructured to include a series of civil-military events aimed at promoting the Armed Forces.

== See also ==
- Hispano-Suiza J12

== Sources ==
- Casanova, Julián (2010). The Spanish Republic and Civil War. Cambridge, England; New York, NY: Cambridge University Press. ISBN 978-0-521-73780-7.
- Payne, Stanley G. (2008). Franco and Hitler: Spain, Germany, and World War II. Connecticut, CT: Yale University Press. ISBN 978-0-300-12282-4.
- Payne, Stanley G. (2011). Spain: A Unique History. University of Wisconsin Press. ISBN 978-0299250249.
- Payne, Stanley G. (2012). The Spanish Civil War. Cambridge University Press. ISBN 978-0-521-17470-1.
- Preston, Paul (1996) [1986]. A Concise history of the Spanish Civil War. London: Fontana. ISBN 978-0-00-686373-1. OCLC 231702516.
- Thomas, Hugh (1961). The Spanish Civil War (1st ed.). London: Eyre and Spottiswoode.
- Westwell, Ian (2004). Condor Legion: The Wehrmacht's Training Ground. Spearhead. Vol. 15. Ian Allan publishing. ISBN 978-0-7110-3043-5.
