= Viriatos =

Portuguese volunteers during the Spanish Civil War

- Emblem used by the "Viriatos".
- Active: 1936 – 1939
- Country: Portugal
- Allegiance: (Spain) Spanish Nationalists
- Branch: Land and air forces
- Type: Volunteers
- Size: 8,000 – 12,000
- Patron: Viriathus
- Engagements: Spanish Civil War

Viriatos, named after the Lusitanian leader Viriathus, was the generic name given to Portuguese volunteers who fought with the Nationalists in the Spanish Civil War. In the first weeks of the war, the Portuguese Army tried to form a Viriatos Legion to aid the Nationalist insurgents in Spain. The Legion was disbanded before any recruitment drive could take place after pro-Republican incidents in Portugal had convinced the government that direct intervention on the side of the Nationalists could cause further unrest.

As a result of widespread publicity for the Viriatos Legion, Portuguese volunteers who later enlisted directly in the Spanish Foreign Legion, Carlist militias, the Falange Militia, or regular army units were known as "Viriatos".

According to the historian Antony Beevor, 12,000 Portuguese participated. The historian Christopher Othen claims the number to be closer to 8,000. A Portuguese Military Observation Mission with members drawn from all three branches of the Portuguese military was present in Spain from 1937 onwards, with the dual objectives of protecting the interests of Portuguese foreign volunteers and collating information on the lessons learned during the civil war.

Although the mission officially had a noncombatant role, its air force contingent took part in combat missions, the aviator José Adriano Pequito Rebelo being a notable member.
