= Alejandro Rodríguez de Valcárcel =

Spanish falangist politician

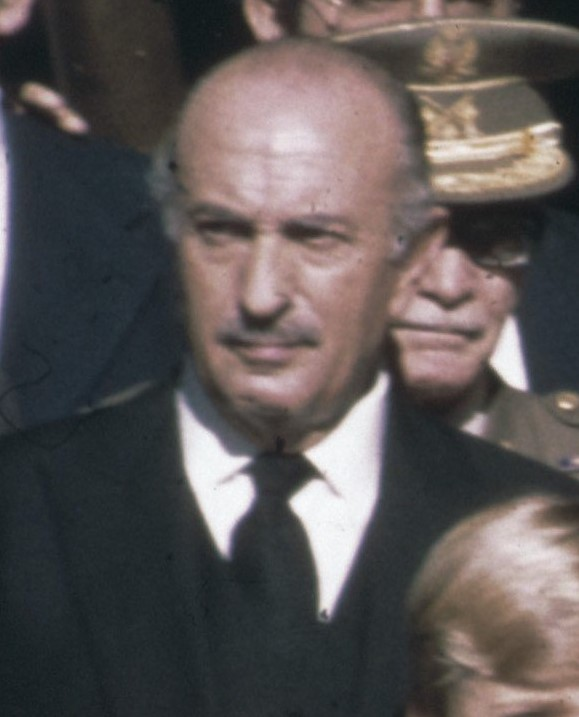
- Alejandro Rodríguez de Valcárcel in 1975

President of the Regency Council of Spain
- In office 20 – 22 November 1975
- Preceded by: Francisco Franco as Head of the Spanish State
- Succeeded by: Juan Carlos I as King of Spain

President of the Cortes Españolas
- In office 27 November 1969 – 5 December 1975
- Preceded by: Antonio Iturmendi Bañales
- Succeeded by: Torcuato Fernández-Miranda

Personal details
- Born: 25 December 1917 Burgos, Spain
- Died: 22 October 1976 (aged 58) Madrid, Spain
- Party: FE de las JONS (until 1937); FET y de las JONS (1937–1976)

Alejandro Rodríguez de Valcárcel y Nebreda (25 December 1917 – 22 October 1976) was a Spanish falangist politician and State lawyer, who served in important positions during the dictatorship of Francisco Franco.

== Biography ==
Born in December 1917 in Burgos to a bourgeois family, he joined the Sindicato Español Universitario (SEU) in 1934. A camisa vieja Falangist, (Note: According to Stanley G. Payne, he became a member of the Falange at the beginning of the Civil War.) he entered the Civil War as a volunteer in a Bandera of the Falange.

From 27 November 1969 to 5 December 1975 he served as the President of the Francoist Cortes.

He was a chief endorser of the Asociación Nacional para el Estudio de Problemas Actuales (ANEPA). (Note: According to a 1974 report by the Ministry of Information and Tourism, he was the direct creator of the association, founded under the acquiescence of Franco.)

In the capacity of President of the Council of Regency, he briefly served as acting Head of State, from Franco's death on 20 November to 22 November 1975, when then Prince Juan Carlos took an oath and was proclaimed King of Spain.

He died on 22 October 1976 in the La Paz University Hospital in Madrid. He was buried at the San José cemetery in Burgos. On 5 January 1977 he was posthumously bestowed the nobiliary title of Count of Rodríguez de Valcárcel.

== Notes ==
Party political offices
| Preceded by Fernando Herrero Tejedor | Vice–Secretary General of FET y de las JONS; 1965–1969 | Succeeded by José Miguel Ortí Bordás |
Political offices
| Preceded by Antonio Iturmendi Bañales | President of the Francoist Cortes; 1969–1975 | Succeeded by Torcuato Fernández-Miranda |
| Preceded by Francisco Franco as Head of the Spanish State | Acting head of state of Spain (as President of the Regency Council); 20–22 November 1975 | Succeeded by Juan Carlos I as King of Spain |
