= Late Francoism =

Final stage of Franco's dictatorship (1969–1975)

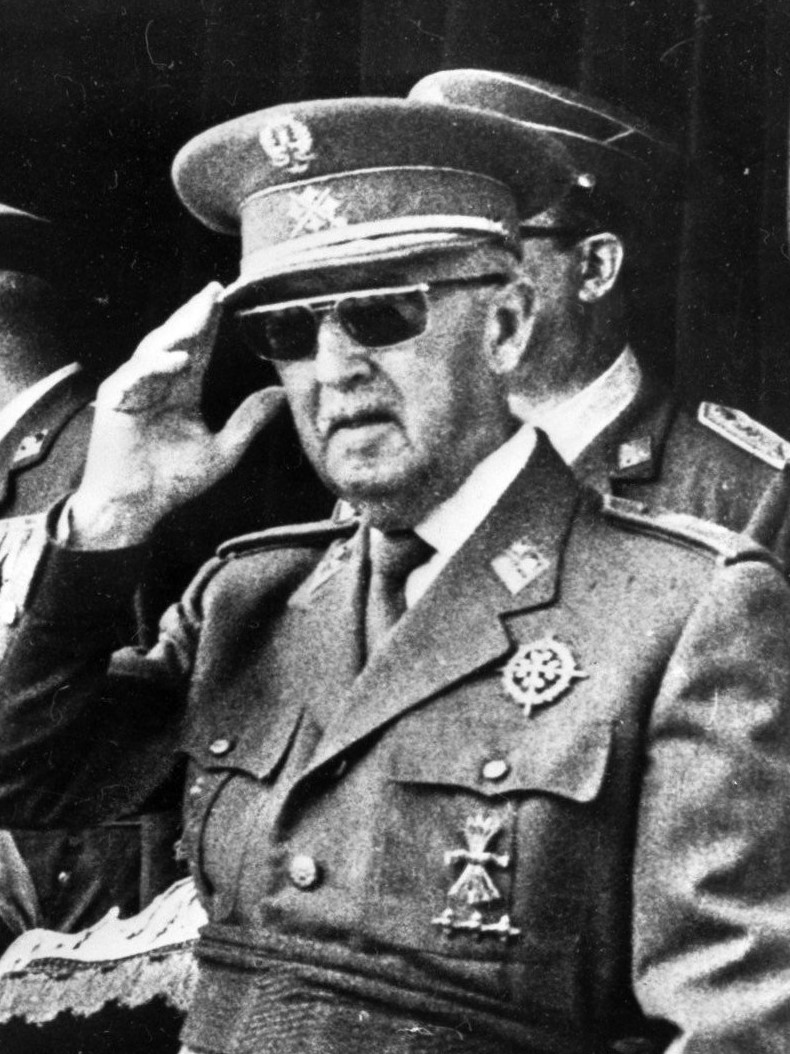
Generalísimo Francisco Franco in 1975

Late Francoism represents the final phase of the Francoist dictatorship, concluding with the death of Francisco Franco on November 20, 1975. This period is commonly dated from October 1969, when the "monocolor" government was established under the effective leadership of Admiral Luis Carrero Blanco, Franco's chief advisor (a designation that followed by three months the Caudillo's appointment of Prince Juan Carlos I as his successor with the title of king). This era is also recognized as the final crisis of Francoism, with some historians pinpointing its onset to the "Burgos trial" of December 1970. Shortly after Franco's demise, Jorge de Esteban and Luis López Guerra observed that "from the early 1970s, it became apparent to the majority of Spaniards that, following a period of apparent stability, the nation was re-entering a pronounced crisis, evidenced primarily by escalating contemporary conflicts and profound uncertainty regarding the future".

According to Javier Tusell, this last phase was shaped by Franco's physical decline, (Note: "Possessing robust health and evident lucidity until the mid-1960s, the memoirs of collaborators such as Fraga and López Rodó suggest a notable deterioration thereafter. The extent of this decline is difficult to pinpoint... He could alternate within minutes between appearing as an attentive elderly figure offering insightful remarks and a disoriented individual disconnected from his surroundings. [...] A hallmark of Parkinson's disease was the apparent weakening of his resolve, diminishing his former ability to mediate between competing factions. Additionally, he seemed increasingly susceptible to influence... Another effect of the disease was heightened inexpressiveness, rendering him a sphinx-like figure to many visitors. [...] Like many aged individuals, he witnessed the collapse of a world to which he had been deeply attached. [...] He remained entrenched in a mindset of National Catholicism... He never endorsed political pluralism, let alone its legal organization... There is also no evidence that he anticipated significant post-mortem changes to his regime" (Tusell, 2007, pp. 240-241). "Franco's decline manifested in his increasing withdrawal from political duties. [...] Until nearly seventy, he engaged in tennis with [the doctor] Vicente Gil or rode through the forests near the [El Pardo] palace. These activities ceased. Friday meetings, whether of the council of ministers or the delegated commission, were reduced by the late 1960s to morning sessions held biweekly. He no longer opened meetings with extensive reviews of national and international affairs but sat silently throughout. [...] Medications for Parkinson's disease rendered him increasingly indecisive" (Preston, 1998, p. 929; 938).) the fragmentation of the regime's elite, the stagnation caused by uncertainty over the succession, and the increasing influence of the anti-Francoist opposition. Luis Suárez Fernández similarly noted the scarcity of clear policy directions between 1969 and 1975.

Borja de Riquer argues that the final six years of the regime reveal why it could not survive Franco's death: the erosion and political crisis affecting the dictatorship were so severe that any effort to sustain it lost credibility.

== Background ==
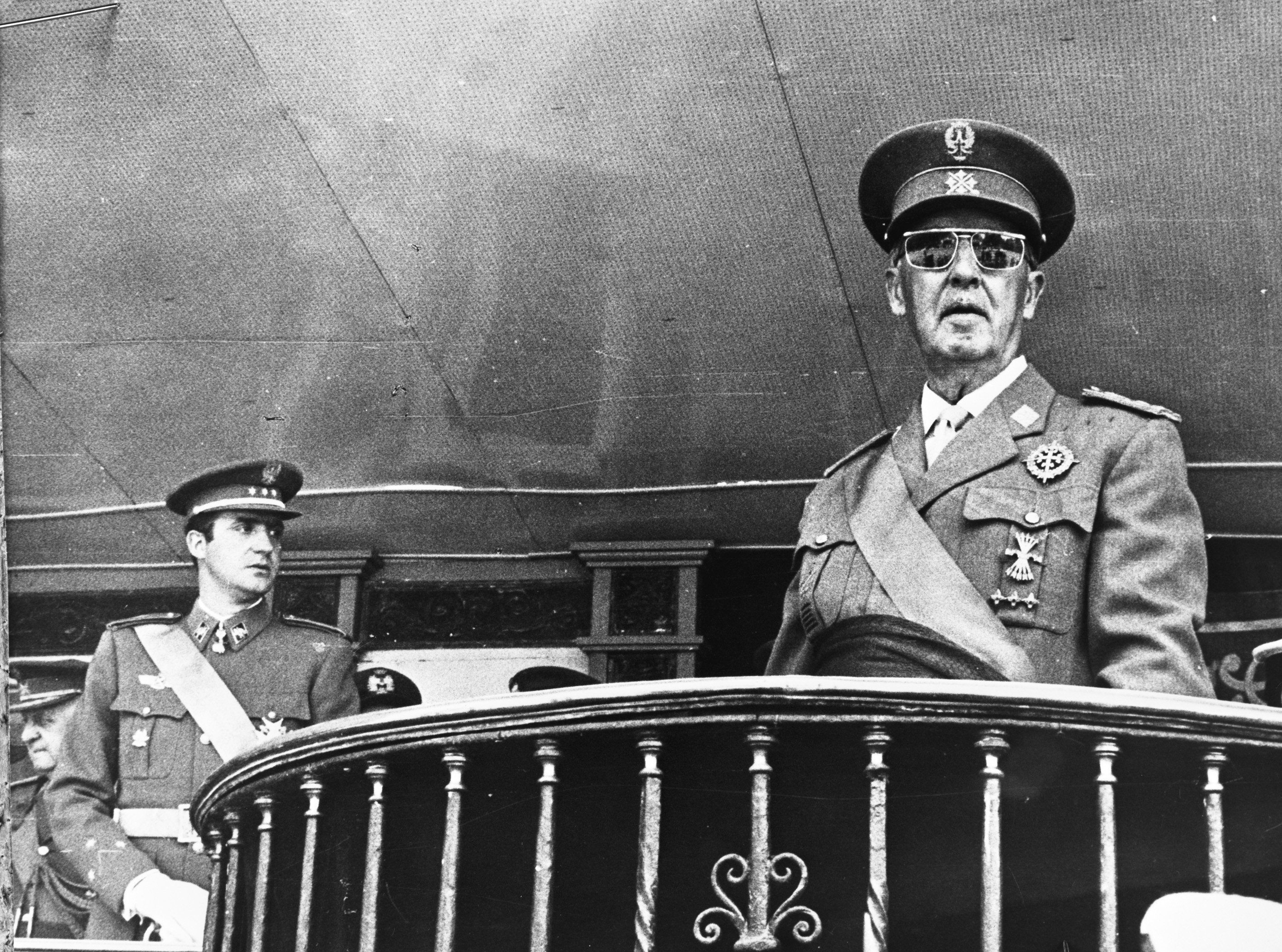
General Franco presiding over the Victory military parade (Madrid, June 5, 1969). In the background, Prince Juan Carlos, whom Franco would designate as his successor 'with the title of king' the following month.

In the 1960s, Francoist leaders considered the regime's future after the anticipated death of the Generalísimo Francisco Franco, who turned seventy in 1962. Two distinct factions emerged:

- The "immobilists" sought to preserve the regime's continuity by maintaining the institutional framework of the Fundamental Laws of the Realm. They supported establishing—rather than restoring—a "Catholic, social, and representative" monarchy distinct from the liberal monarchy overthrown in 1931—embodied by Juan Carlos, son of Juan de Borbón, who had been under Franco's tutelage since 1948. This group included the majority of "technocrats" associated with Opus Dei, with Admiral Carrero Blanco—Franco's principal advisor and de facto government head—as their key figure, alongside the "old guard" Falangists of the National Movement.
- The "aperturists" advocated reforms that would align the political system with the social and economic changes produced by the post-1959 development cycle. They argued that economic modernization required corresponding political evolution. Drawn from within the Movement, their principal figures were Ministers: Manuel Fraga Iribarne, Minister of Information and Tourism; Fernando María Castiella, Minister of Foreign Affairs; and José Solís Ruiz, Minister-Secretary General of the Movement and National Delegate of Unions. Solís attempted to revitalize the Movement through "political associations" and to expand worker participation in the Trade Union Organization, seeking broader social support. Some aperturists, including Solís and possibly Fraga, opposed Carrero Blanco's monarchic approach and favored a presidential model inspired by Gaullism.

According to Borja de Riquer the divide between "immobilists" and "aperturists" reflected differing assessments of Spain's social transformations and the growing political and social contestation. The former believed that "subversion" required reinforcing the regime's foundational principles, while the latter held that the gap between existing institutions and social reality demanded adaptation to avoid a deeper crisis.

The aperturists achieved one significant reform, the 1966 Press Law promoted by Fraga. However, Solís failed to implement the Statute of Associations, and union elections were used by clandestine workers' commissions to gain influence. The immobilists secured two decisive victories: the approval of the Organic Law of the State in 1967 and Franco's designation of Juan Carlos as his successor in July 1969. Juan Carlos swore allegiance to the Principles of the National Movement and assumed the title Prince of Spain. In presenting Juan Carlos to the Cortes, Franco declared that the decision would ensure that "everything be tied and well tied for the future".

== Failure of Immobilist Continuism (1969–1973) ==
=== "Monocolor" Government ===
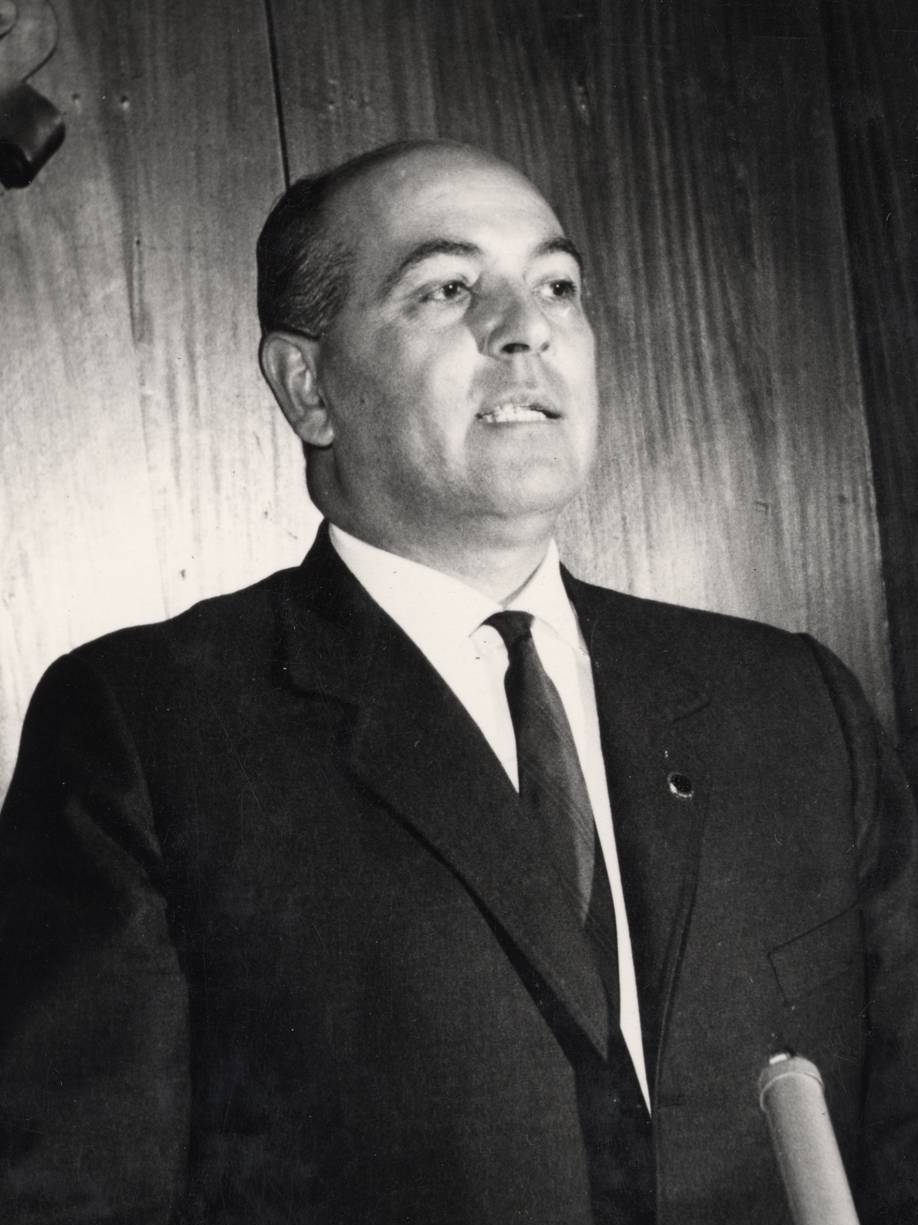
The "aperturist" José Solís in 1962, during his tenure as Minister-Secretary General of the Movement, a position he relinquished with the formation of the "monocolor" government, effectively led by Admiral Carrero Blanco.

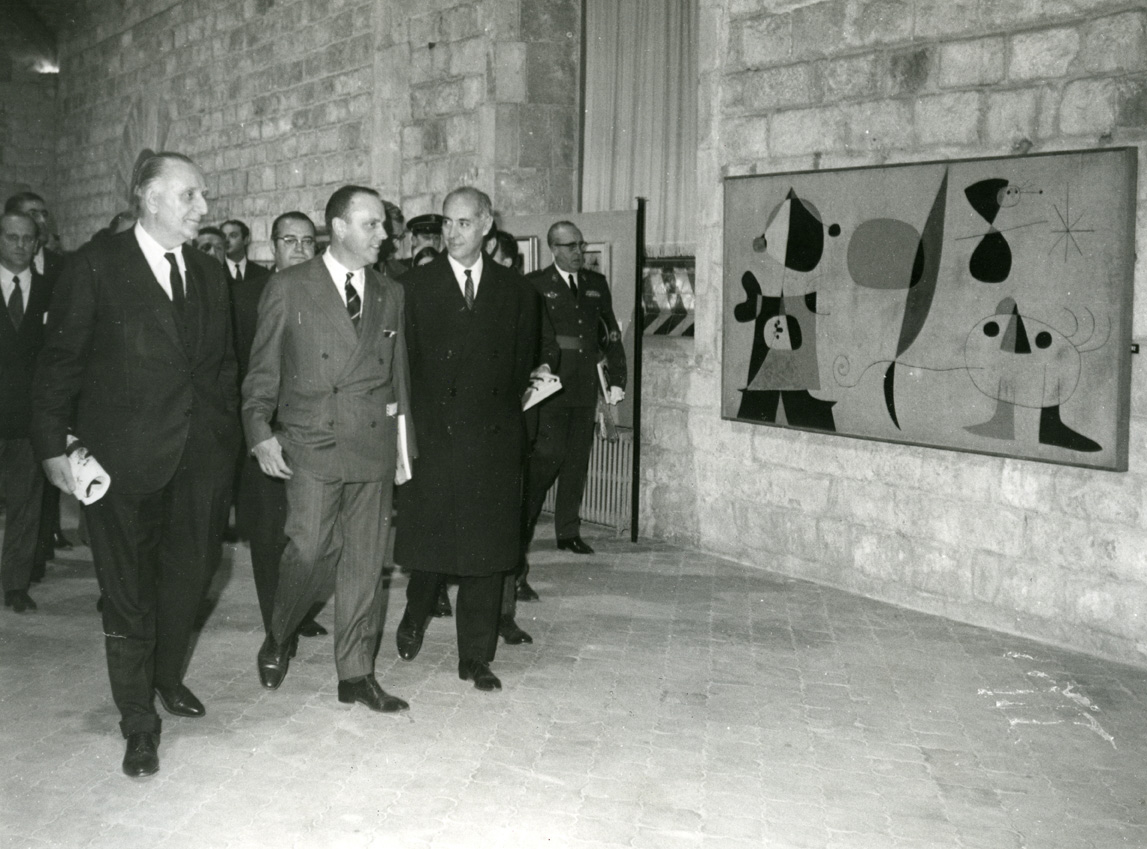
Laureano López Rodó (right) at the November 1968 opening of a Joan Miró exhibition in Barcelona, serving as Commissioner Minister of the Development Plan. Center: then Minister of Information and Tourism Manuel Fraga Iribarne; left: Barcelona mayor José María de Porcioles.

The ascendancy of Admiral Luis Carrero Blanco after Juan Carlos's designation as successor intensified the divide between the "technocrats" and the "aperturists." This tension culminated in the Matesa scandal of August 1969, in which two Opus Dei–linked "technocrat" ministers—Economy Minister Juan José Espinosa San Martín and Commerce Minister Faustino García-Moncó Fernández, both of whom resigned—were indirectly implicated. The aperturists, José Solís Ruiz and Manuel Fraga Iribarne, attempted to use the scandal to weaken the technocrats, publicizing it through Movement-controlled media; Arriba even called it a "national disaster." The effort backfired: the technocrats emerged strengthened when Franco accepted Carrero Blanco's call for a "united government without wear and tear". Carrero submitted to Franco a sharply critical report on Solís, Fraga, and Foreign Minister Fernando María Castiella; it denounced Fraga's 1966 Press Law for enabling attacks "on the Spanish way of being and on public morality," citing the proliferation of morally objectionable material in print and theater.

The crisis resulted in the "monocolor" government of October 1969, so termed by its critics because it was dominated by Opus Dei technocrats and figures loyal to Carrero Blanco and his associate Laureano López Rodó—though some historians note that the label is imprecise, as significant ministerial differences persisted. Carrero, while remaining vice president, effectively assumed presidential responsibilities, convening weekly meetings with ministers and presiding over preparatory "little councils" that shaped Council of Ministers decisions. The three aperturist ministers—Fraga, Solís, and Castiella—were dismissed, Falangist representation was further reduced, and López Rodó's influence was evident in the appointment of four ministers from the Commissariat of the Development Plan. A symbolic gesture accompanying the reshuffle was the appearance of the new Minister-Secretary General of the Movement, Torcuato Fernández Miranda, in a white shirt rather than the traditional Falangist blue.

The 1969 cabinet departed from the long-standing balance among regime "families" that Franco had maintained. Javier Tusell interpreted this as evidence of the decline of Franco's political judgment; at seventy-five, he no longer arbitrated effectively between competing factions. Paul Preston likewise argues that Franco's approval of such an unbalanced government showed a diminished grasp of Spain's political and social realities. For Borja de Riquer, the new government marked a decisive triumph for Carrero Blanco, widely seen as Franco's presumptive successor and the chief guarantor of continuity. In his year-end message, Franco insisted that "everything had been tied and well tied". Yet Tusell emphasizes that Carrero lacked the qualifications to exercise what amounted to a presidency over a society increasingly distant from his worldview. The cabinet's formation deepened the existing rift between immobilists and aperturists. To counterbalance the Carrero–López Rodó axis, Franco appointed the Falangist Alejandro Rodríguez de Valcárcel to preside over the Cortes and the Council of the Realm, breaking the tradition of entrusting the post to a traditionalist.

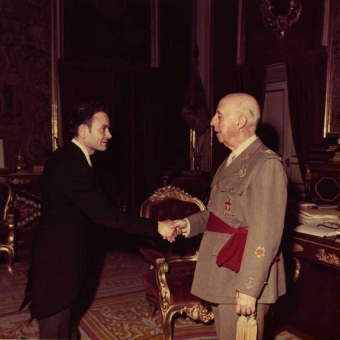
The Generalísimo Francisco Franco during an audience at the El Pardo Palace (April 1972).

During the four years of the "monocolor" government (1969–1973), the divide between the immobilists—now firmly led by Admiral Luis Carrero Blanco with Franco's backing—and the aperturists deepened. Carrero was convinced that the regime faced a coordinated "subversive" campaign by communism and Freemasonry; in 1972 he warned the National Council of the Movement that Spain, like the "entire free world," was targeted by communist subversion and "liberal propaganda sponsored by Freemasonry". By contrast, aperturist leader Manuel Fraga Iribarne argued, shortly after his dismissal, that the country "would not tolerate stagnation" and questioned how new generations and middle classes could be integrated "without associations". Franco himself reaffirmed the ideological foundations of the regime, describing the Movement in October 1970 as "Spain's great reserve in any near or distant contingency" and stressing the need to transmit the "national spirit" to younger generations. He again invoked the Army as the guardian of national conscience and justified the July 18, 1936, uprising as a defense of Christian civilization.

Both immobilists and aperturists aimed to preserve the regime after Franco's death but diverged fundamentally: the former sought to maintain the authoritarian framework within a monarchy "of July 18", established by Franco rather than by dynastic right, while the latter advocated broadening participation through associations within the Movement. The immobilists, especially the most inflexible sector—termed "ultras" or the bunker for their resistance to change akin to Hitler's stance in the bunker of the Third Reich's Chancellery—dominated the National Council of the Movement. Their influence rested on strong military support and on a network of organizations, including the National Confederation of Ex-Combatants, the Guardia de Franco, the José Antonio Doctrinal Circles, the Hermandad del Maestrazgo, the Spanish Priestly Brotherhood, Fuerza Nueva, and the Guerrilleros de Cristo Rey.

A third faction emerged in these same years: the reformists, composed of former aperturists who viewed an internally guided, vaguely defined transition to "democracy" as the only viable exit from Francoism. Led by Manuel Fraga Iribarne, this group included senior administrators and public-sector executives (Pío Cabanillas, Antonio Barrera de Irimo, Francisco Fernández Ordóñez), and younger Movement cadres such as José Miguel Ortí Bordás, Rodolfo Martín Villa, Gabriel Elorriaga Fernández, and Adolfo Suárez. Another prominent subgroup was the Christian-democratic "Tácito" collective (Leopoldo Calvo-Sotelo, Marcelino Oreja, and Alfonso Osorio), whose members would later play significant roles in the Spanish transition.

The central political objective of the government remained securing the succession of Don Juan Carlos. This process was complicated by the December 1971 announcement of the marriage between Don Alfonso de Borbón Dampierre and Franco's granddaughter María del Carmen Martínez-Bordiú Franco. Because the law allowed modification of the succession, the engagement prompted speculation that Alfonso—who claimed headship of the House of Bourbon by virtue of his father Infante Jaime's original dynastic position—might replace Juan Carlos. Juan Carlos intervened with Franco to avoid this outcome. Franco instead granted Alfonso the title Duke of Cádiz, placing him unusually high in the protocol, which Javier Tusell characterized as a "peculiar situation." Loyal to the regime, Alfonso sought the Ministry of Sports but was appointed instead to the largely ceremonial presidency of the Institute of Hispanic Culture.

Despite escalating social tensions, the monocolor government introduced no major political reforms. The only significant change was the abandonment of the name FET y de las JONS for the National Movement. The earlier project to create associations within the Movement was definitively shelved: on December 15, 1969, the National Council rejected the proposal at the request of Minister-Secretary General Torcuato Fernández Miranda. Franco himself warned the Cortes in November 1971 that ideological groups would effectively become political parties, which he rejected. Fernández Miranda, following Franco's instructions, ensured that associations would not be permitted "in his lifetime" or, as he confided, even afterward. Similarly, José Solís Ruiz's initiative to establish a framework for trade-union autonomy was abandoned; the 1971 Union Law merely reinforced the bureaucratic nature of the Trade Union Organization. Over these years, Carrero Blanco increasingly aligned with the neo-Francoist position of the bunker, distancing himself from the "technocrats," who thereby lost their chief protector. Carrero argued that intransigence was a "duty" when "fundamental issues" were at stake and developed what Javier Tusell terms an "apocalyptic" view of political life, attributing all conflict to a concealed "subversive" minority of communists and Freemasons, occasionally extending this accusation to Christian democracy. This perspective was codified in a 98-page report submitted to Franco on March 17, 1970, titled Planning of a Government Action, which identified communism, Freemasonry, and Christian democracy as the regime's principal threats.

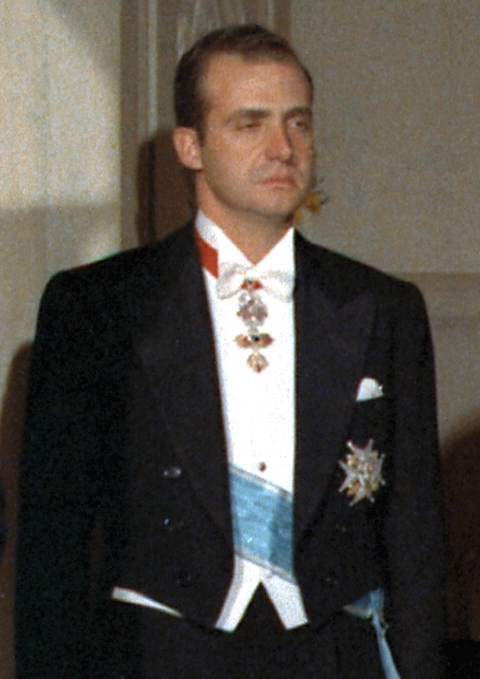
Juan Carlos de Borbón, Prince of Spain, in 1971.

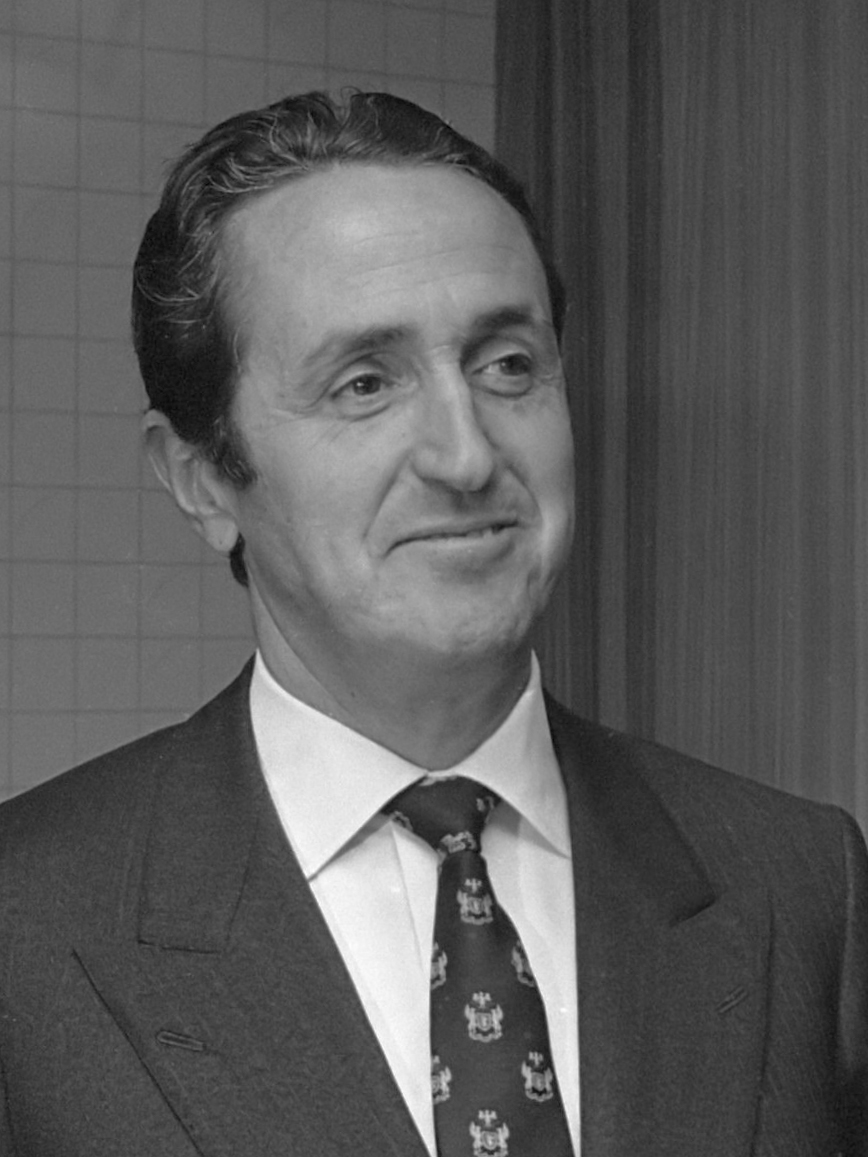
Gregorio López Bravo, Minister of Foreign Affairs, in 1972.

The government's immobilism soon provoked resignations, beginning with Minister of Public Works Federico Silva Muñoz in April 1970, who also sought greater funding for his department. His replacement, Gonzalo Fernández de la Mora, represented the most reactionary sector of the technocrats and opposed any form of pluralism. Two years later, Interior Minister Tomás Garicano Goñi resigned for similar reasons. Following Silva Muñoz's departure, only one member of the regime's Catholic "family," Alberto Monreal Luque, remained in the government.

Among the few notable accomplishments of the monocolor government was the 1970 General Law of Education (the "Villar-Palasí Law"), which introduced substantial reforms to the outdated Francoist educational system. Foreign policy under Gregorio López Bravo was also comparatively successful. Spain concluded a Preferential Agreement with the European Economic Community on 30 June 1970—though full membership remained impossible under an authoritarian regime—and signed a Friendship and Cooperation Agreement with the United States in August, followed by President Richard Nixon's visit to Spain the next month. A more contentious development involved commercial treaties with Eastern European socialist states and the Soviet Union in 1972, strongly opposed by the ultras, as well as Spain's recognition of the People's Republic of China. López Bravo was unable, however, to advance negotiations with the Holy See on revising the Concordat of 1953 in accordance with the reforms of the Second Vatican Council.

Efforts to improve the regime's international image included visits abroad by Prince Juan Carlos and Princess Sofía. These were not without difficulties. During a late 1971 visit to Washington, several newspapers cited Juan Carlos as saying that Spaniards desired "greater freedom," adding that the question was one of pace. Upon his return, Franco reprimanded him, reminding him that certain matters could be addressed abroad but not discussed domestically. Months earlier, The New York Timeshad run an interview under the headline "Juan Carlos Promises a Democratic Regime," prompting Minister Laureano López Rodó, Carrero's closest associate, to warn the prince to exercise greater caution.

=== Growing social and political conflict ===
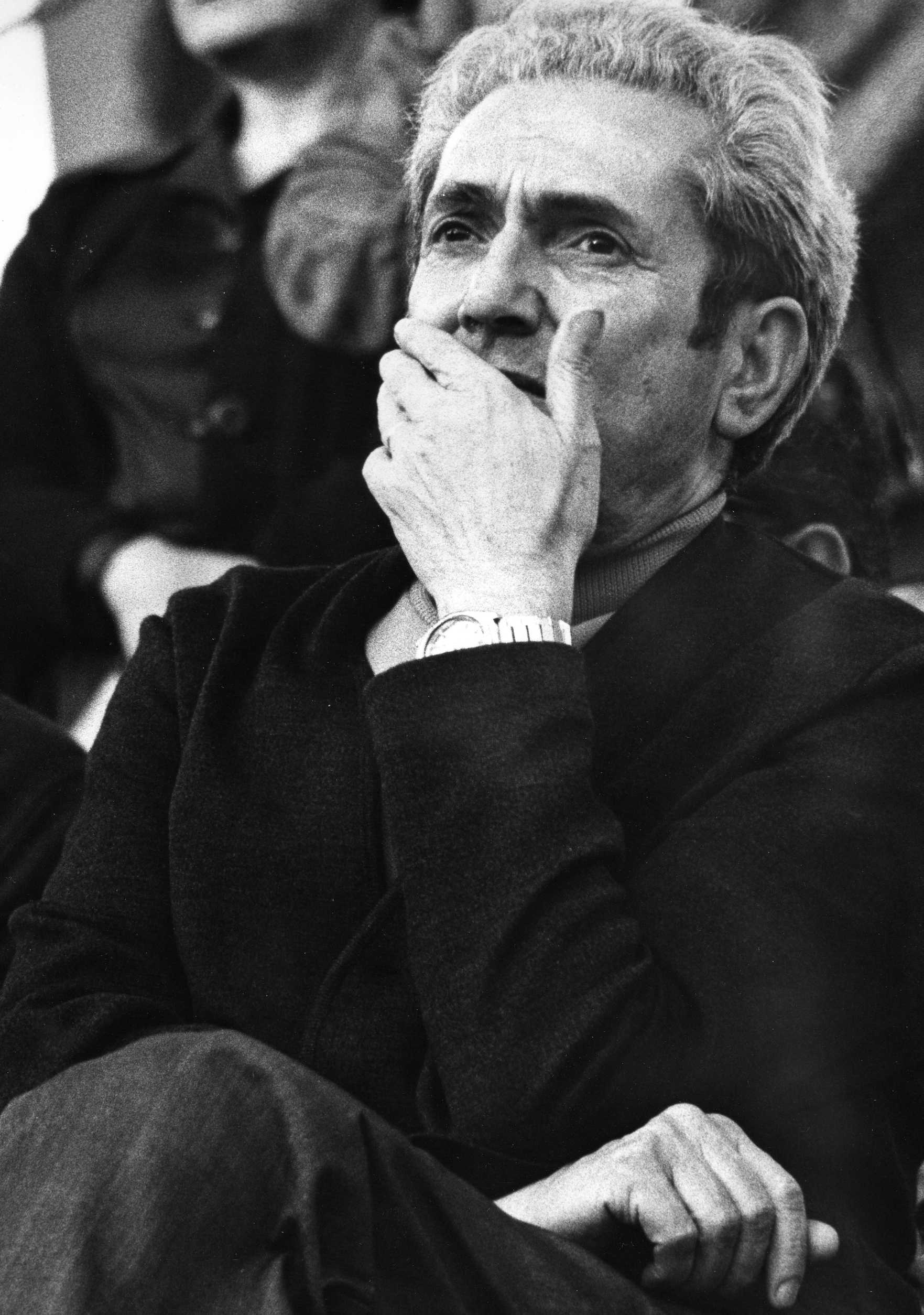
Marcelino Camacho, leader of the "workers' commissions." He was arrested with other leaders of this illegal, clandestine union in June 1972, tried, and sentenced by the Public Order Tribunal to twenty years' imprisonment in the "process 1001," coinciding with the assassination of Carrero Blanco on December 20, 1973.

Entrenched in strict immobilism, the monocolor government responded to renewed labor and student unrest primarily through police repression. Between 1970 and 1973, seven workers were killed in labor-related incidents (three in Granada in 1970, one in Barcelona in 1971, two in Ferrol in 1972, and one in Sant Adrià de Besòs in 1973). In 1971 and 1972, the Trade Union Organization dismissed 17,643 worker representatives for alleged "subversive activities," and in June 1972 the leading figures of the illegal "workers' commissions" were arrested during a meeting in Pozuelo de Alarcón. The ten defendants—including Marcelino Camacho, Nicolás Sartorius, Eduardo Saborido, and Francisco García Salve—received long prison sentences in the "Process 1001".

A confidential 1972 report from the Civil Government of Barcelona acknowledged that, although the number of activists was small, they had succeeded in fostering worker solidarity through assemblies that magnified their influence. Some regime officials attributed the unrest to the workers' commissions, which they believed had developed "highly skilled agents in mass agitation." In a 1971 speech to the Cortes, Franco linked "strikes, riots, and violence" to external, often economic or financial, forces and suggested that subversion aimed to obstruct industrial development.

Unrest was even more pronounced in the universities, where the situation became increasingly unmanageable. Luis Suárez Fernández, Director General of Universities from 1972 to 1974, later conceded that authorities failed to improve institutional functioning. Francoist officials blamed "subversive agitators" who used students as "a manipulable mass," generating an atmosphere hostile to authority and necessitating continual police presence. "The political radicalization of students turned many faculties into centers of assemblies, clandestine publications, and solidarity campaigns, supported by the mobilization of non-tenured professors (PNNs). Carrero Blanco urged Franco to remove "enemies of the regime" from teaching posts and expel students serving as "instruments of subversion." As a result, police operations, administrative sanctions, government-ordered detentions, and actions by far-right groups tolerated by authorities—such as the Guerrilleros de Cristo Rey and National University Action—proliferated. Paul Preston described the Guerrilleros de Cristo Rey as a "parapolice terrorist gang" organized by Carrero's SECED to carry out repression without direct government attribution. In his year-end messages of 1969 and 1970, Franco depicted student unrest as the work of a small minority manipulated by communist directives, contrasting it with the general conduct of Spanish youth.

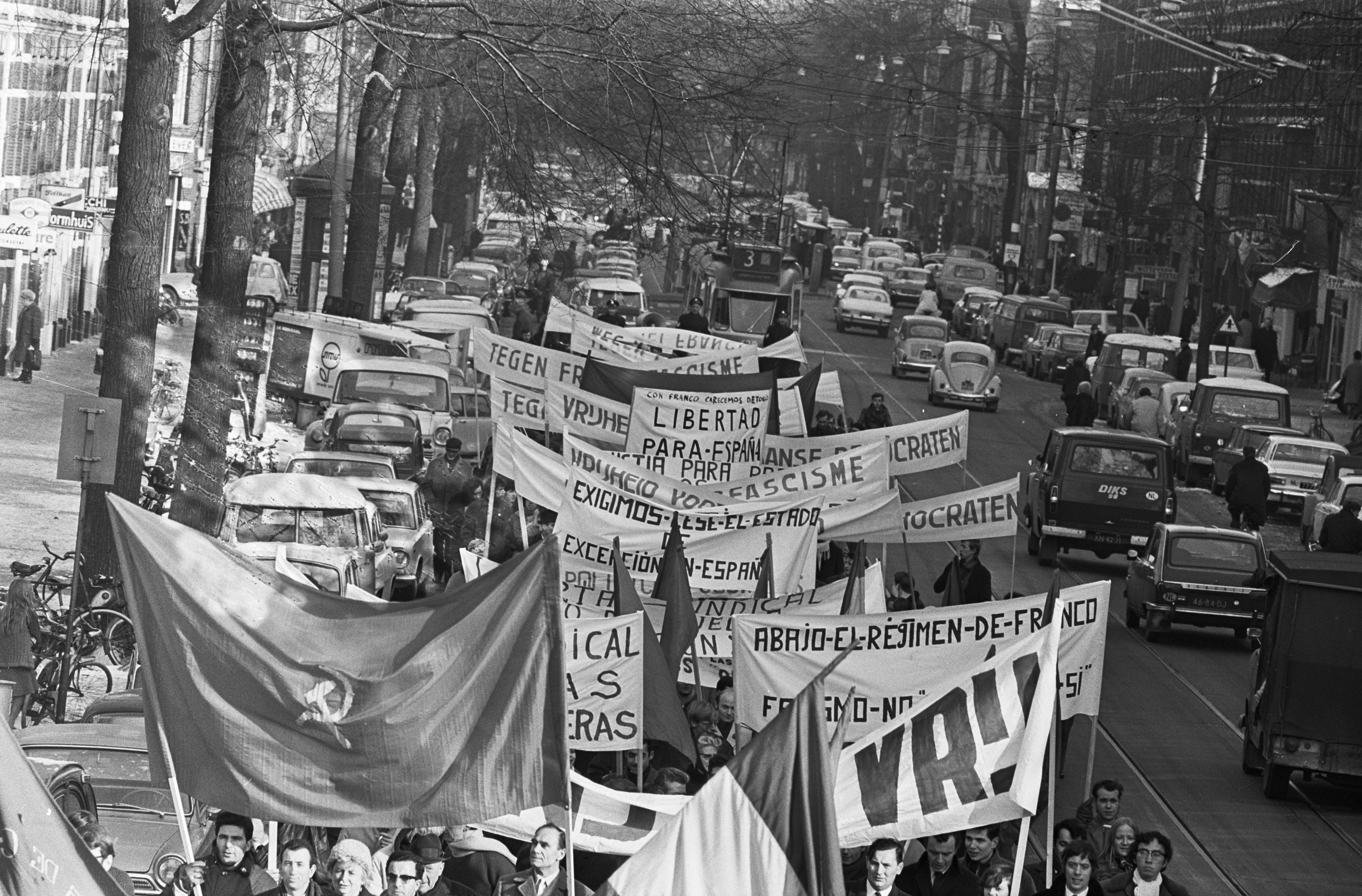
Anti-Francoist demonstration in Amsterdam (February 1969) demanding the end of the state of exception in the Basque Country, imposed by Franco following ETA's murder of the Brigada Político-Social commissioner Melitón Manzanas.

Repression was harshest in the Basque Country and Navarre, as ETA's escalating terrorist campaign "shattered the myth of the regime's invulnerability." In 1969 alone, 1,953 people were arrested; 890 reported mistreatment, 510 alleged torture, 93 were tried by the Court of Public Order, and 53 faced courts-martial. On 18 September 1970, Basque nationalist Joseba Elósegui set himself on fire and leapt before Franco at a pelota match in San Sebastián, shouting Gora Euskadi askatuta. His act, intended as a symbolic response to the 1937 bombing of Guernica, drew international attention. Two and a half months later, the "Burgos trial" began against sixteen ETA members, held before a military tribunal in Burgos, seat of the Captaincy General responsible for the Basque region.

=== Crisis of the "Burgos Trial" ===
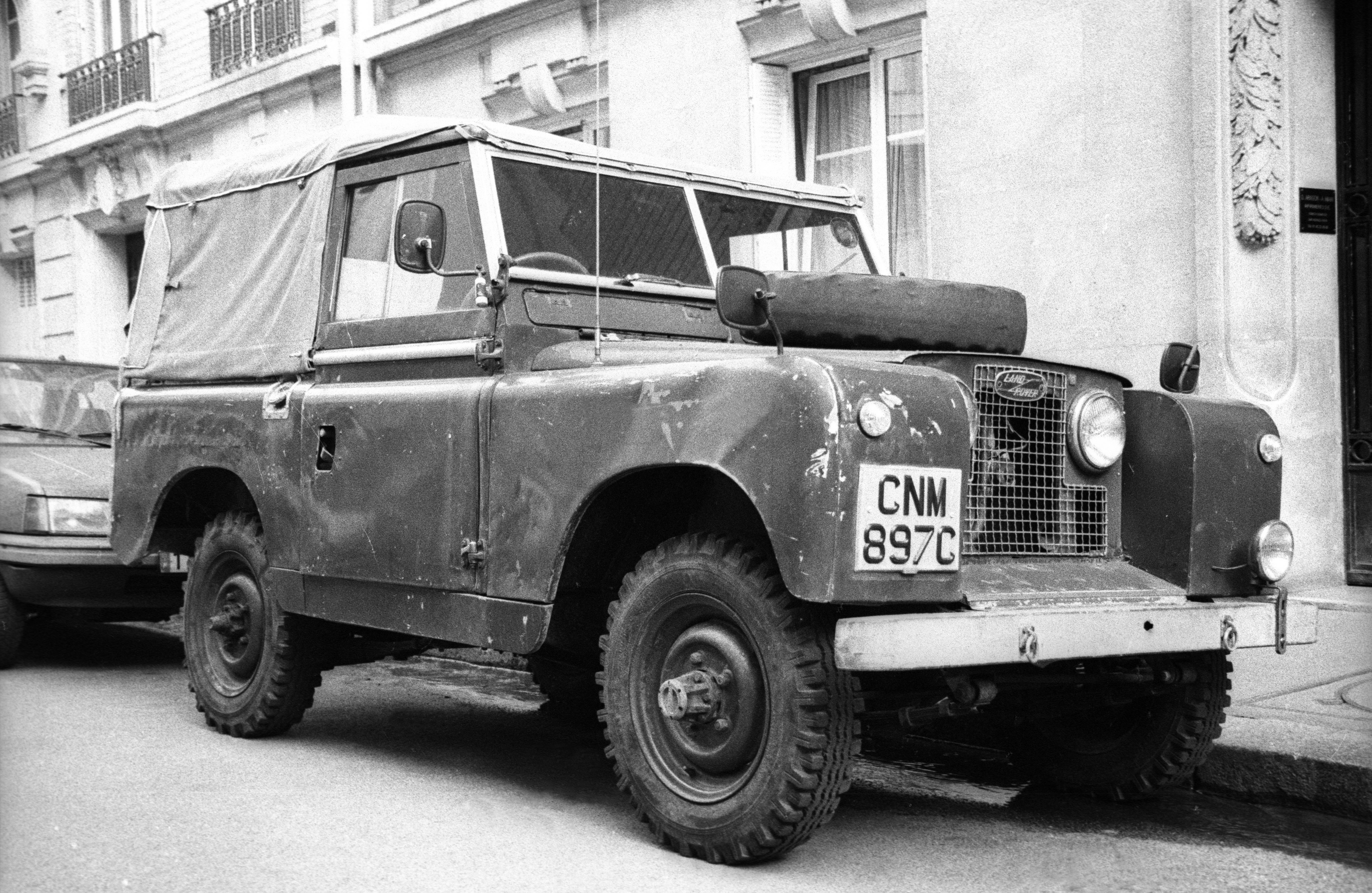
Land Rover Series II, employed by the Armed Police, commonly known as the grays for their uniform color.

The "Burgos trial" became the most serious crisis faced by the new government and the Francoist regime, precipitating a rapid escalation of tensions and widening divisions within the ruling elite. Pressured by the regime's hardline "blue" generals, Franco authorized a highly publicized military trial intended as an exemplary response to ETA's attacks. The strategy backfired: the mere announcement of the summary proceedings sparked widespread solidarity in the Basque Country and Navarre, reinforcing Basque nationalism. On the trial's opening day, student and worker strikes occurred in various Guipúzcoa companies alongside street protests in San Sebastián. The government declared a three-month state of exception in Guipúzcoa, extending it nationwide on 14 December after similar unrest in Bilbao and other areas. The defendants' counsel included prominent lawyers affiliated with the anti-Francoist opposition: Gregorio Peces Barba, Juan María Bandrés, Francisco Letamendía, and Josep Solé Barberà.

The trial prompted broad intellectual mobilization. Three hundred Catalan cultural figures, including Joan Miró, staged a sit-in at Montserrat Monastery, in support of the accused and called for the restoration of the 1932 Catalan Statute of Autonomy. In Madrid, 131 intellectuals, including Ramón Tamames, Enrique Tierno Galván, Joaquín Ruiz Giménez, and Manuel Jiménez de Parga, issued a manifesto demanding amnesty and political and trade-union freedoms, while universities across the country saw renewed protests. Two days before the trial, ETA kidnapped the honorary German consul in San Sebastián, Eugen Beihl, releasing him on Christmas Day. On 26 December, the tribunal sentenced six defendants to death and imposed long prison terms on the others, acquitting one woman. ETA also attempted—unsuccessfully—to seize a television repeater in Burgos province to disrupt state broadcasting.

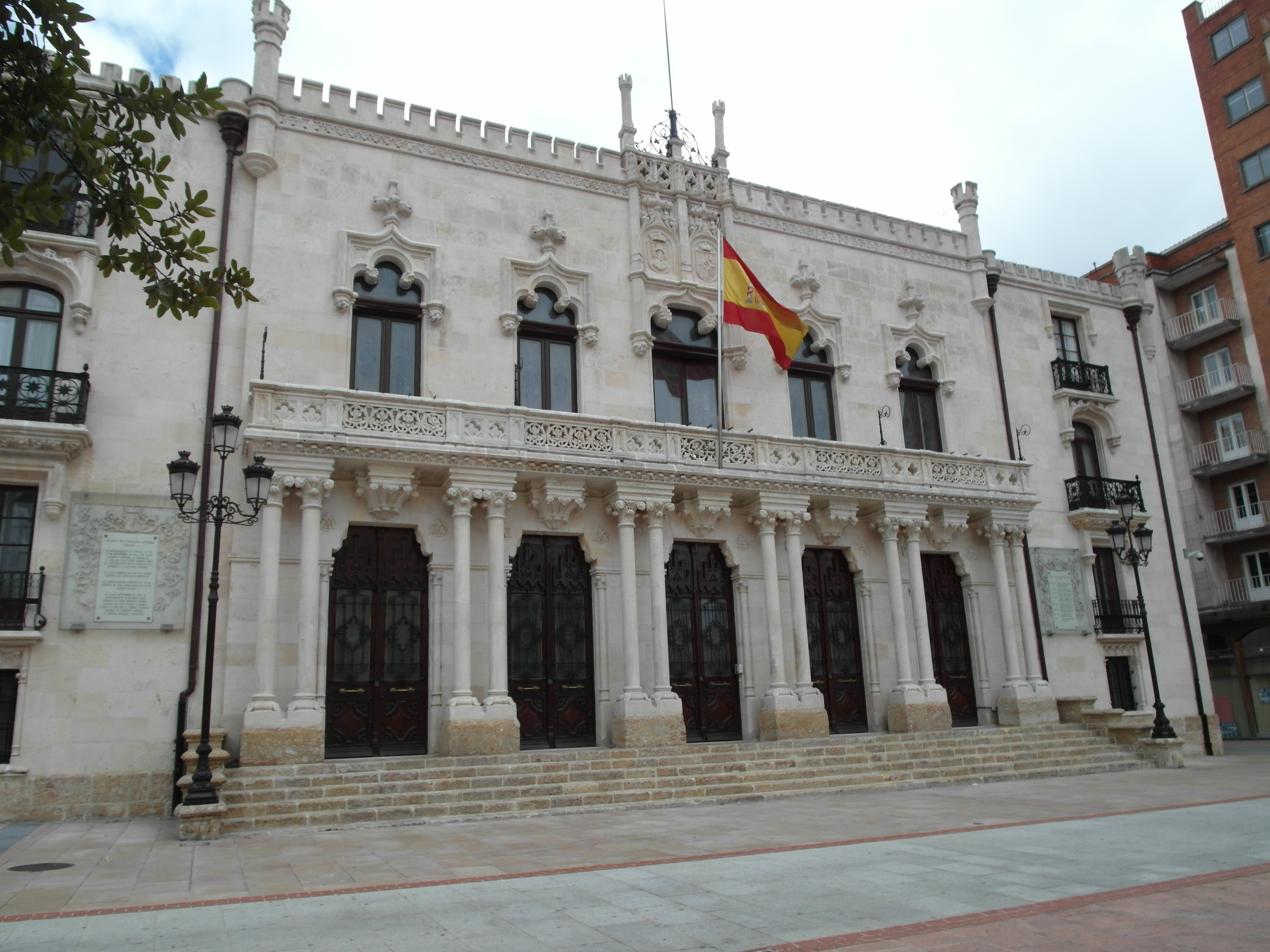
Building of the Captaincy General of the VI Military Region in Burgos.

International reaction was extensive, generating a solidarity movement for the Basque people and for democratic freedoms in Spain. The trial deepened the rift between the Catholic Church and the regime: the Bishop of San Sebastián and the Apostolic Administrator of Bilbao issued a pastoral condemning the death penalty and military jurisdiction, while also rejecting all forms of violence. Their stance drew government criticism but was partially supported by the Spanish Episcopal Conference, which called for "maximum clemency." Twenty-three bishops dissented. The papalnuncio Monsignor Luigi Dadaglio, worked to prevent the executions, and several foreign bishops, including the Archbishop of Paris, denounced human rights violations. A Vatican spokesperson later stated that the Holy See received the verdict with "deep emotion," a response that unsettled the government. Domestically, the regime tightened control over the press, reverting to threats, fines, seizures, and temporary closures, a campaign that culminated eleven months later with the permanent closure of the newspaper Madrid.

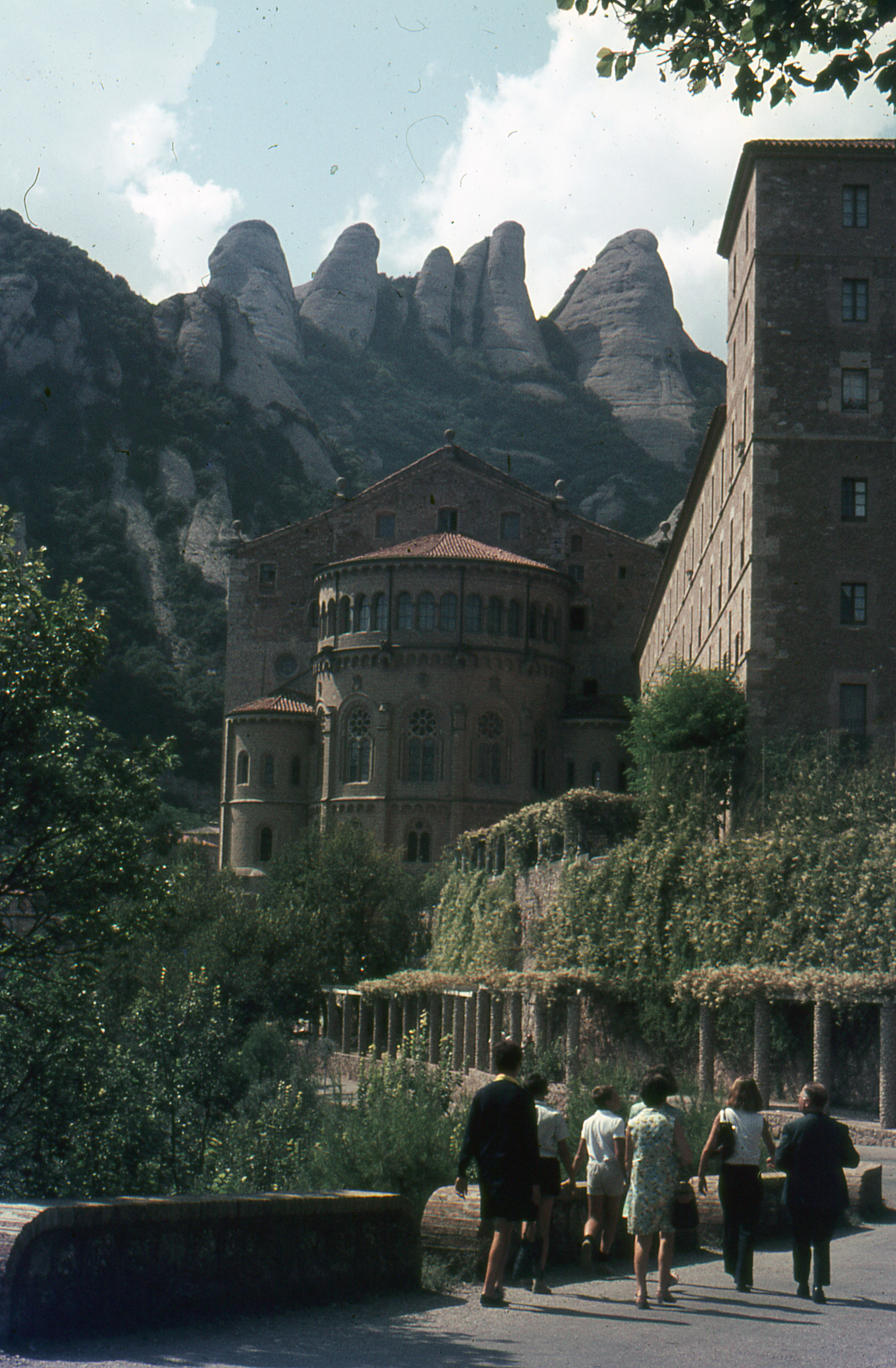
Photograph of the Montserrat Monastery from 1969. In December of the following year, three hundred intellectuals, artists, and Catalan professionals, including painter Joan Miró, barricaded themselves there in solidarity with the accused "for defending the national rights of the Basque people" (also demanding the reinstatement of the Statute of Autonomy of Catalonia of 1932).

The crisis also emboldened the most reactionary Francoist sectors, including veterans' associations, which accused the government of weakness and criticized the Church for its stance. Military authorities echoed these views, warning of the Army's readiness to prevent any return of "subversion." Far-right groups organized demonstrations supporting Franco and denouncing separatism and Marxism; slogans also targeted the government and the episcopate. The largest rally took place in Madrid's Plaza de Oriente on 17 December, where thousands gathered to acclaim Franco and the Army. Although not initially scheduled to attend, Franco appeared on the Royal Palace balcony to greet the crowd. Numerous telegrams of support subsequently reached the El Pardo Palace.

Concurrently, contacts were established among the most involutionist military officers, coordinated by the Captain General of the I Military Region Joaquín Fernández de Córdoba, who gained an audience with Franco. They condemned the regime's aperturist tendencies and demanded a firmer stance against the opposition. Together with Fernández de Córdoba, the captains general of Burgos, Barcelona, and Seville—Tomás García Rebull, Alfonso Pérez Viñeta, and Manuel Chamorro—also visited El Pardo. The government reacted quickly: the state of exception was extended to the entire country (suspending article 18 of the Fuero de los Españoles, which limited preventive detention), General Carlos Iniesta Cano, a hardliner, was appointed head of the Civil Guard, and García Rebull assumed command of the I Military Region. On 21 December, Carrero Blanco denounced an "international campaign orchestrated by communism" and warned aperturists in a speech to the Cortes, which was strongly applauded. Other military figures insisted that the regime's "deep crisis" required greater Army involvement and a separation of the Head of State from the presidency of the government. Admiral Pedro Nieto Antúnez and Lieutenant General Manuel Coco Rodríguez likewise urged Franco to apply the law rigorously.

In view of the trial's international resonance and widespread clemency appeals, Franco commuted on 30 December the nine death sentences issued against six ETA members. The decision followed a Council of Ministers discussion—where a majority favored clemency—and consultation with the Council of the Realm, which recommended it). One of those urging commutation was Nicolás Franco, who warned his brother against signing the executions. Lieutenant General Rafael García Valiñohad also reminded Franco of the adverse climate created by Julián Grimau's 1963 execution, stressing the need for military jurisdiction to remain unquestioned.

British documentary from 1971 about Franco's Spain. It features the 1970 or 1971 Victory parade, the dispersal of a University of Madrid student demonstration by the Armed Police on horseback during the Burgos trial, and the appointment of Prince Juan Carlos as Franco's successor in the July 1969 Francoist Cortes session (Duration: 10 minutes).

Franco announced the commutations in his year-end message, framing international protests as hostility from "powers historically opposed to our prosperity" and defending the regime as a state governed by law. He also addressed tensions with the Church, insisting that Church and State aims "cannot contradict each other," and reiterated that he had no intention of retiring. He justified the commutations by referring to recent demonstrations of public support and the advice of the Council of the Realm.

Despite the commutation, criticism from "ultras" persisted. According to Laureano López Rodó, an attempt was even made to promote a form of censure motion against the government through the Cortes president Alejandro Rodríguez de Valcárcel, despite the Cortes lacking such authority. At a veterans' gathering, the Captain General of Granada, Fernando Rodrigo Cifuentes, denounced the "white Freemasonry of Opus Dei" for sowing discord; he was later removed from his post.

Between 17 and 23 February 1971, the National Council of the Movement met in closed session, following a December petition by forty councilors who believed the regime was "dangerously weakening". The meeting revealed sharp divisions between immobilists and aperturists. One of the strongest critics, the involutionist leader Blas Piñar, leader of Fuerza Nueva, accused the government and aperturists of betraying the "July 18 principles and called for the government's resignation, receiving prolonged applause. Piñar later claimed Carrero Blanco approached him in support, though Javier Tusell later described Carrero as regarding Piñar as "a dangerous extremist, albeit well-intentioned.

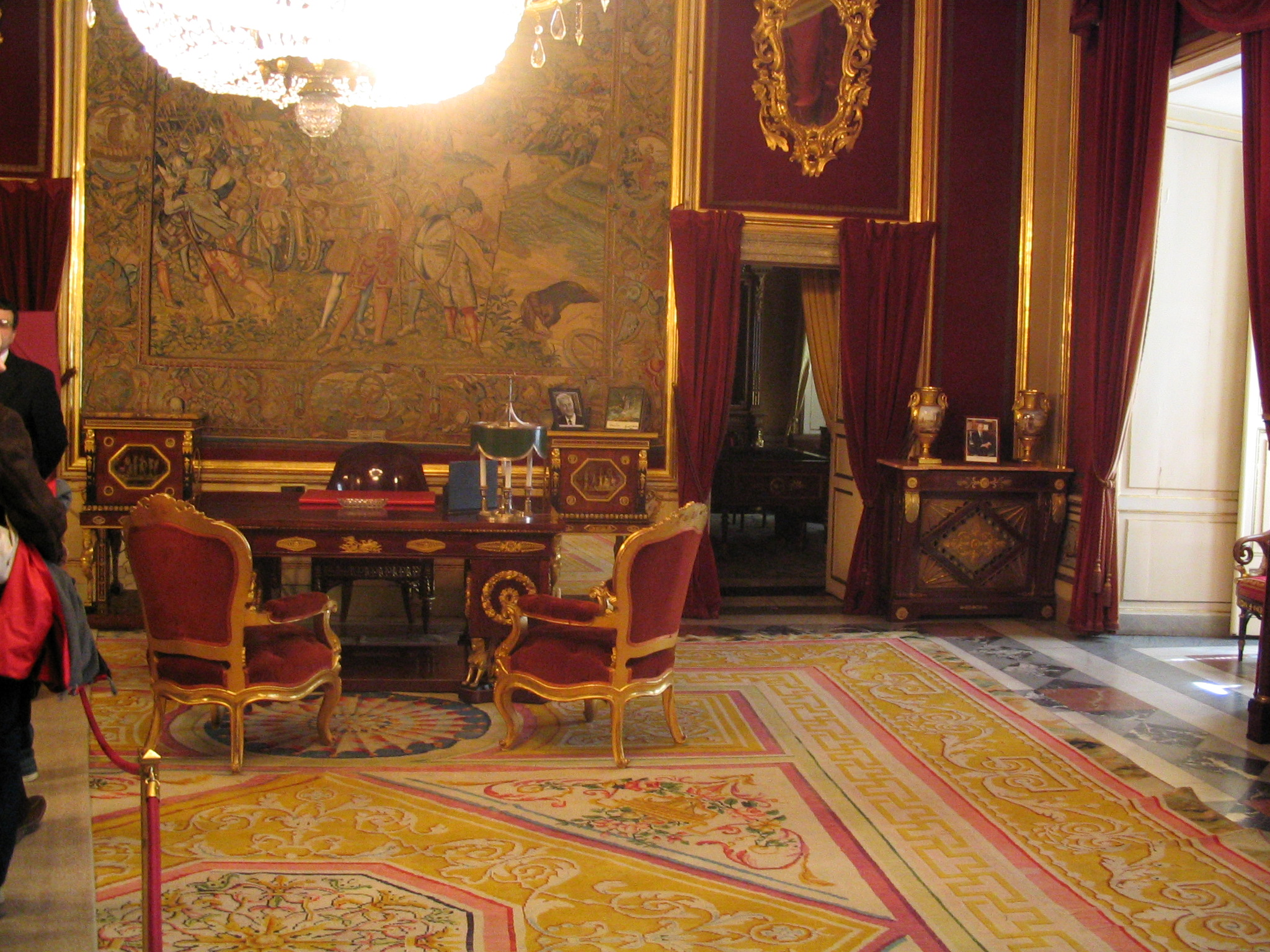
Office of the Generalísimo Francisco Franco in the El Pardo Palace, his official residence.

The most anticipated intervention in the plenary session of the National Council was delivered by Admiral Pedro Nieto Antúnez, who had promoted the convocation and was a close confidant of Franco. In a letter to the Caudillo, he enclosed the speech "out of loyalty," asserting his duty to express his views. Nieto Antúnez accused the government of failing to counter the

international campaign organized by communism in support of ETA and the Workers' Commissions and urged its replacement by an administration whose authority derived both from Franco's designation and from broad national support. He proposed a program centered on "defense of national honor, strengthening of institutions, authentic social justice, and popular participation.

transformed ETA's previously secondary terrorist activity into the focal point of a deep identity conflict between much of the Basque population and the Francoist state. After the trial, ETA's positions gained wider resonance, allowing the organization to rebuild at a moment of internal weakness, while the anti-Francoist opposition increasingly tolerated its violence as a lesser evil. According to Borja de Riquer, the regime committed a grave political error by enabling the case to evolve into an international challenge to its legitimacy in prosecuting what many regarded as Basque patriots defending their culture and identity.

The "Burgos trial" has been widely interpreted as the beginning of the terminal crisis of Francoism. When Franco announced the commutation of the death sentences on 29 December 1971 with apparent detachment, he implicitly acknowledged the regime's severe internal tensions. For Paul Preston, the trial was "a disaster," as it unified the opposition, provoked strong criticism from the Church, and encouraged aperturist Francoists to distance themselves from a "sinking ship." Javier Tusell, while noting that the pardons stabilized the situation after days of maximum tension, also recognized that the regime suffered substantial deterioration and committed a serious error in its handling of domestic and international public opinion.

Two months later, Franco received General Vernon A. Walters, deputy director of the CIA, who described him as visibly aged and physically weakened, with unmistakable symptoms of Parkinson's disease. When asked about the future, Franco insisted that Juan Carlos's succession was secure and that the Army would prevent any destabilization.

In April 1970, the West German Foreign Minister, Walter Scheel, visited Madrid and, to Franco's irritation, met with four tolerated representatives of the "moderate" opposition—Joaquín Ruiz-Giménez, Enrique Tierno Galván, José María de Areilza, and Joaquín Satrústegui. They reiterated the demands set out in the manifesto of the 131 intellectuals of December 1969 and urged Scheel to oppose Spain's entry into the European Economic Community until it guaranteed individual and collective rights, universal suffrage, political parties, a freely elected parliament, and trade union freedom.

=== Tensions with the Catholic Church ===
Subsequent to the "Burgos Trial," tensions between the Francoist regime and the Catholic Church intensified. In January 1971, Bishop Gabino Díaz Merchán contested the arrest of a priest accused of using sermons for "political or Marxist purposes," asserting that only ecclesiastical authorities could assess doctrinal content, while civil powers were limited to legal violations. Tensions deepened when Vicente Enrique y Tarancón was appointed Archbishop of Madrid in May 1971 (formally ratified in December). Aligned with Díaz Merchán, Tarancón advocated ending "National Catholicism" and reducing Church collaboration with the regime, in line with Second Vatican Council reforms. He assumed the presidency of the Spanish Episcopal Conference a year later. Meanwhile, Justice Minister Antonio Oriol Urquijo published a contentious article in ABC warning of "Marxist infiltration" among the clergy and doctrinal distortions.

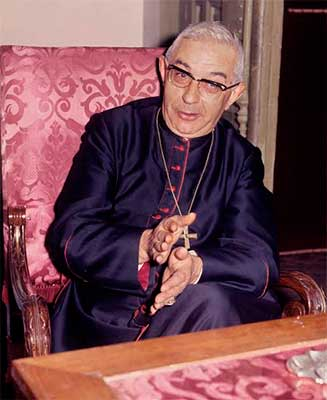
Cardinal-Archbishop of Madrid Vicente Enrique y Tarancón

A definitive shift in the Church's stance occurred in September 1971 during the Joint Assembly of Bishops and Priests, presided over by Cardinal Tarancón. By a majority of 215 to 26, the Assembly endorsed a declaration favoring "independence and healthy collaboration between the Church and the State," departing from the Concordant of 1953. A second document, seeking forgiveness for failures in reconciliation after the Civil War, received 137 votes in favor versus 78 against. The war, previously characterized as the "Spanish Crusade," was redefined as a "war between brothers," a formulation later formalized in the 1975 collective episcopal document La Reconciliación en la Iglesia y en la Sociedad. Francoist politicians viewed the initiative as a revival of Civil War-era divisions, while Cardinal Tarancón later described it as "the first public act questioning the intimate connection between the Church and the Regime". Integrist groups, such as the Spanish Priestly Brotherhood, and the Vatican Congregation for the Clergy issued critical responses.

Churches and Catholic institutions increasingly hosted clandestine opposition meetings, strike assemblies, and protest occupations, often provoking police intervention. Parish and diocesan bulletins documented such mobilizations, prompting the Ministry of Justice to claim that apostolic movements were exceeding the limits established by the 1953 Concordat. In September 1971, controversy arose over Tarancón's reinstatement of Mariano Gamo as parish priest of Moratalaz, recently released from prison for allowing "unauthorized" gatherings in his church.

Franco received the Church's evolving stance with dismay, perceiving it as a "stab in the back." Carrero Blanco publicly criticized the Church in December 1972 for its ingratitude, citing the regime's extensive financial support for religious infrastructure and activities. That same month, the Justice and Peace Commission of Spain, led by the Bishop of Huelva, released Si quieres la paz trabaja por la justicia, denouncing the regime's structures as obstructing true peace. Tensions culminated in January 1973 when the Episcopal Conference, responding to Carrero Blanco's request for continued Church support, issued Iglesia y comunidad política (approved by 59 bishops against 20), advocating Church-State separation, respect for human rights, and democratic pluralism. In the same month, a meeting between Pope Paul VI and the Minister of Foreign Affairs Gregorio López Bravo ended abruptly after the Pope silenced criticism of Vatican policy toward Spain, signaling a decisive rupture between the Catholic Church and the Francoist regime.

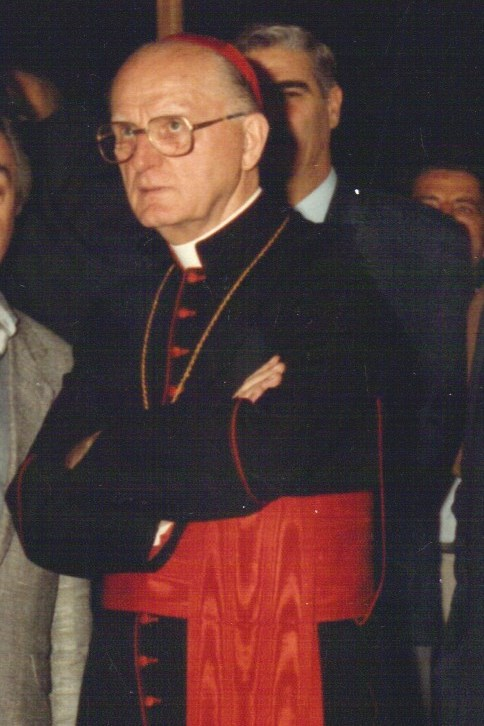
The Apostolic Nuncio in Spain Luigi Dadaglio

By June 1973, an internal government memorandum noted that "religious progressivism and opposition to the Spanish regime coincide… with a value little less than synonymous." The "ultra" campaign against Cardinal Tarancón and the so-called "red bishops" had intensified, expressed through graffiti, posters ("Tarancón to the firing squad"), and frequent police interventions, including violent expulsions from parishes and Catholic centers. Fines, restrictions on Catholic publications, and the detention of priests increased, as did the number of clerics imprisoned in the Zamora Concordat Prison. In November 1973, coinciding with the visit of Secretary of State of the Holy See Agostino Casaroli, imprisoned priests launched a hunger strike demanding amnesty, the closure of Zamora Prison, and the Church's refusal to negotiate with the regime. The strike received support from Catholic groups organizing lock-ins in Bilbao, San Sebastián, and Pamplona. On November 6, a violent disturbance in Zamora destroyed the altar and liturgical items, prompting the transfer of six priests to other facilities. Four days later, about one hundred base community members, including fifteen priests, occupied the Apostolic Nunciature in solidarity, also demanding amnesty for political prisoners and protesting the "Process 1001". The bishops of Bilbao, San Sebastián, and Segovia endorsed a letter calling for the prison's closure. The government denounced the incident as sacrilege, prompting a rebuttal by Segovia's Bishop Antonio Palenzuela. Consideration of expelling Nuncio Monsignor Luigi Dadaglio, perceived as complicit, was defused by interventions from Madrid's auxiliary bishops, who accepted the protesters' demands. The integrist Spanish Priestly Brotherhood condemned the events, claiming that Spain's traditional faith was under threat. On November 14, Cardinal Tarancón and Prime Minister Carrero Blanco met to ease tensions; Tarancón described Carrero as "an honorable man and a good Christian, though… anchored in pre-Second Vatican Council criteria," and refused to publicly disavow his auxiliary bishops. On November 29, roughly one hundred priests and nuns occupied the Madrid Diocesan Seminary; negotiations with police ensured their peaceful departure.

Violent suppression of Church factions most estranged from the regime prominently involved the "ultra" parapolice group Guerrilleros de Cristo Rey. Although left-wing sources accused the Public Order Forces of protecting them, Luis Suárez Fernándeznotes that while proof is inconclusive, many regime loyalists tacitly approved their actions. The Guerrilleros de Cristo Rey enjoyed the support of the Spanish Priestly Brotherhood, an integrist organization of clergy opposing the Second Vatican Council's reforms.

=== New government and assassination of Carrero Blanco ===
By mid-1973, the political inefficacy of Carrero Blanco and the "technocrats" highlighted that Francoism had entered a terminal phase, reflecting its growing anachronism amid the social and cultural changes of the 1960s. By 1970, Spanish society differed from its European counterparts chiefly in the authoritarian nature of its political system.

This deficiency was articulated by the Minister of the Interior, Tomás Garicano Goñi, in his resignation tendered to Franco in May 1973. He had previously submitted confidential reports to Franco criticizing government complacency toward "ultra" violence and advocating genuine political openness. Garicano Goñi described the Movimiento Nacional as incapable of maintaining public order without broader citizen participation and warned that Prince Juan Carlos's prospects would be dim if political insularity persisted. The immediate trigger for his resignation was the May 2 disturbances in Madrid during the funeral of policeman Juan Antonio Fernández, assassinated by the far-left Revolutionary Antifascist and Patriotic Front. A crowd seized the coffin, paraded it through the city with Civil Guard collaboration, and shouted slogans calling for Garicano Goñi's removal and the execution of "reds." In subsequent days, regime hardliners intensified attacks on the minister and government, accusing them of weakness and advocating forceful measures against subversion. Far-right demonstrators also targeted Cardinal Tarancón and "red priests," chanting "Tarancón to the firing squad".

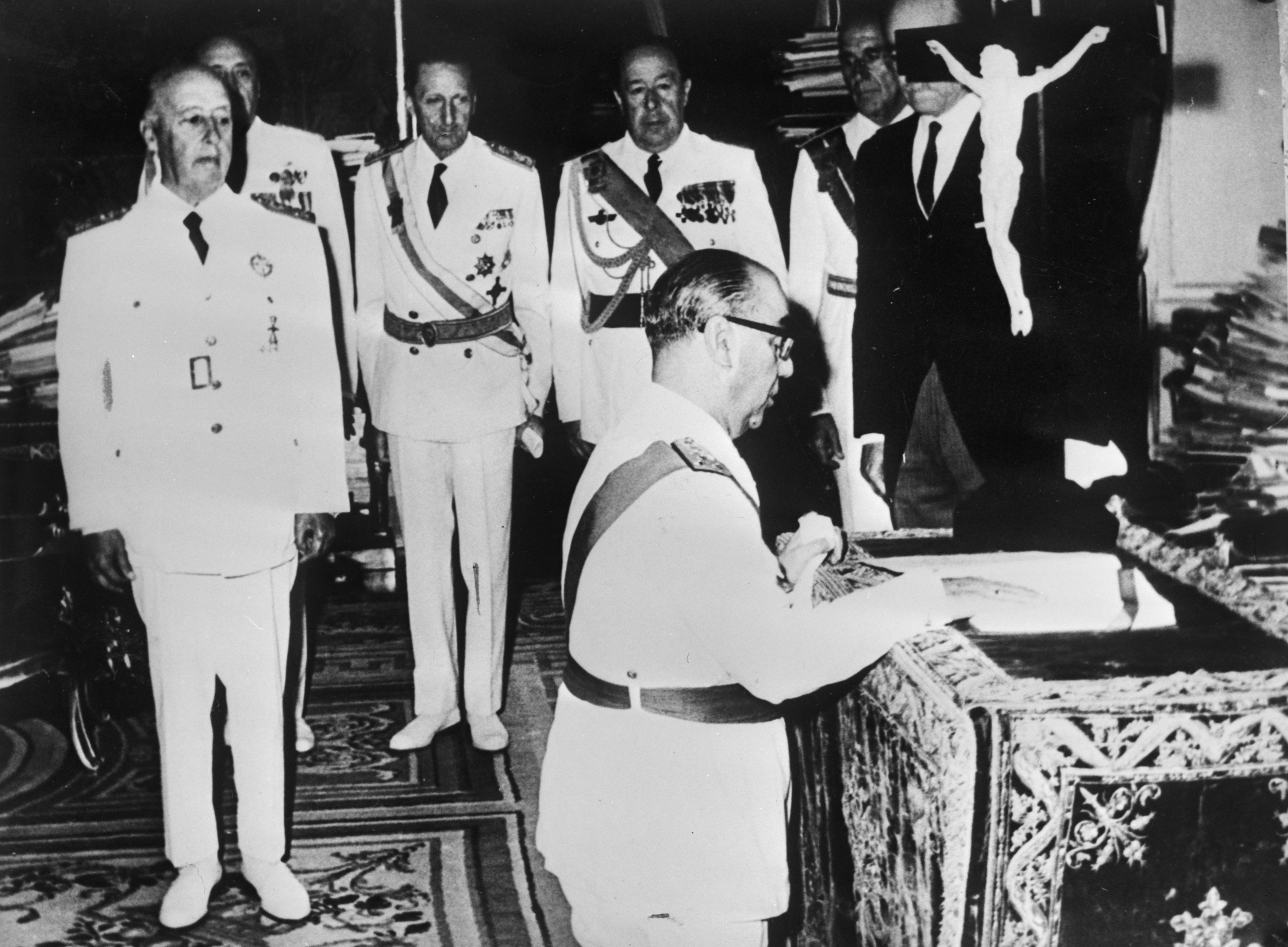
Admiral Luis Carrero Blanco sworn in as Prime Minister before Franco (June 1973).

Garicano Goñi's resignation strengthened Carrero Blanco, who was appointed Prime Minister by Franco, a position the Caudillo had never previously relinquished. Recognizing his limited remaining lifespan, Franco viewed Carrero as the optimal guarantor of regime continuity. Carrero formed a cabinet of loyalists, yielding only to Franco's family by appointing Carlos Arias Navarro, a hardliner, as Minister of the Interior.

Carrero increasingly aligned with the regime's "hardline" faction, publishing pseudonymous articles criticizing advocates of political associations, even within the Movement. In his inaugural address, he emphasized continuity: "If I were to summarize in a single word the action plan the government intends to follow, I would simply say: continue." Among Carrero's ministers, Julio Rodríguez Martínez oversaw Education and implemented a decree moving the university term to January instead of September, dubbed the "Julian calendar". Former minister Manuel Fraga Iribarne, visiting Franco before assuming his ambassadorship to the United Kingdom, observed that the dictator appeared "increasingly detached from the vital capacities required by his great responsibility." Concurrently, a labor dispute erupted in Pamplona, led by clandestine workers' commissions in solidarity with dismissed Motor Ibérica employees and demanding trade union freedom. Strikers occupied the Church of El Salvador, and the local bishop refused police eviction, supplying sustenance through Cáritas. Within days, Motor Ibérica conceded to strike demands. The episode was seen as a systemic defeat, demonstrating the Church's willingness to support trade union freedom."

The new administration enacted no substantive measures; by late October 1973, Fernández Miranda had presented a draft Law of Political Associations that categorically rejected political parties and was never discussed in the Council of Ministers. The government endured only six months. On the morning of Thursday, 20 December 1973, coinciding with the scheduled commencement of the "process 1001" trial against the leadership of the clandestine "workers' commissions", ETA detonated a bomb buried beneath a central Madrid street, striking Carrero Blanco's official vehicle and killing him. Vice President Torcuato Fernández Miranda swiftly assumed authority, preventing the regime's "ultra" factions from mounting extreme responses, and averting military mobilization. Lieutenant General Carlos Iniesta Cano, Director General of the Civil Guard, initially ordered the suppression of any "subversive" demonstrations "without the slightest restriction on the use of firearms", but Fernández Miranda, supported by Interior Minister Carlos Arias Navarro, Admiral Gabriel Pita da Veiga, and Chief of the Joint Chiefs of Staff, Lieutenant General Manuel Díez Alegría, compelled him to rescind the directive. As Javier Tusell noted, "if the event surprised anyone, it was merely due to its novelty at that juncture… the days following Carrero's assassination prolonged the profound impression his death had elicited within Spanish society." Luis Suárez Fernández emphasized that the government "lacked intelligence regarding what was truly being orchestrated.

The day after the assassination, a small assembly of "ultra" Francoists gathered at the site, displaying Spanish flags, Falange banners, and those of the Traditionalist Communion. Blas Piñar, leader of Fuerza Nueva, condemned the government's passivity. The lying in state took place at the Palace of the Presidency, where Cardinal Tarancón celebrated a corpore insepulto Mass. "Ultra" groups shouted at the cardinal upon departure, prompting outrage from two ministers toward the leader of Guerrilleros de Cristo Rey, Mariano Sánchez Covisa. The funeral on 21 December was presided over by Prince Juan Carlos in naval attire; Franco did not attend, appearing "utterly overwhelmed" and secluded. That day, the Council of Ministers posthumously awarded Carrero Blanco the title of Duke. Franco, visibly moved, described the attack as a "horrendous crime that has cost the life of our president." The following day, Franco attended a funeral at the Basilica of San Francisco el Grande. Borja de Riquer observed that the "visibly aged Franco… conveyed the impression of presiding over the obsequies of his own political regime." Cardinal Tarancón again officiated, facing attempted assaults and chants of "Army to power!" Ultra hardliners, including Education Minister Julio Rodríguez Fernández, initially refused to acknowledge the cardinal and offered to lead a commando to pursue the assassins in France, a plan aborted by Fernández Miranda, who required Rodríguez Fernández to apologize.

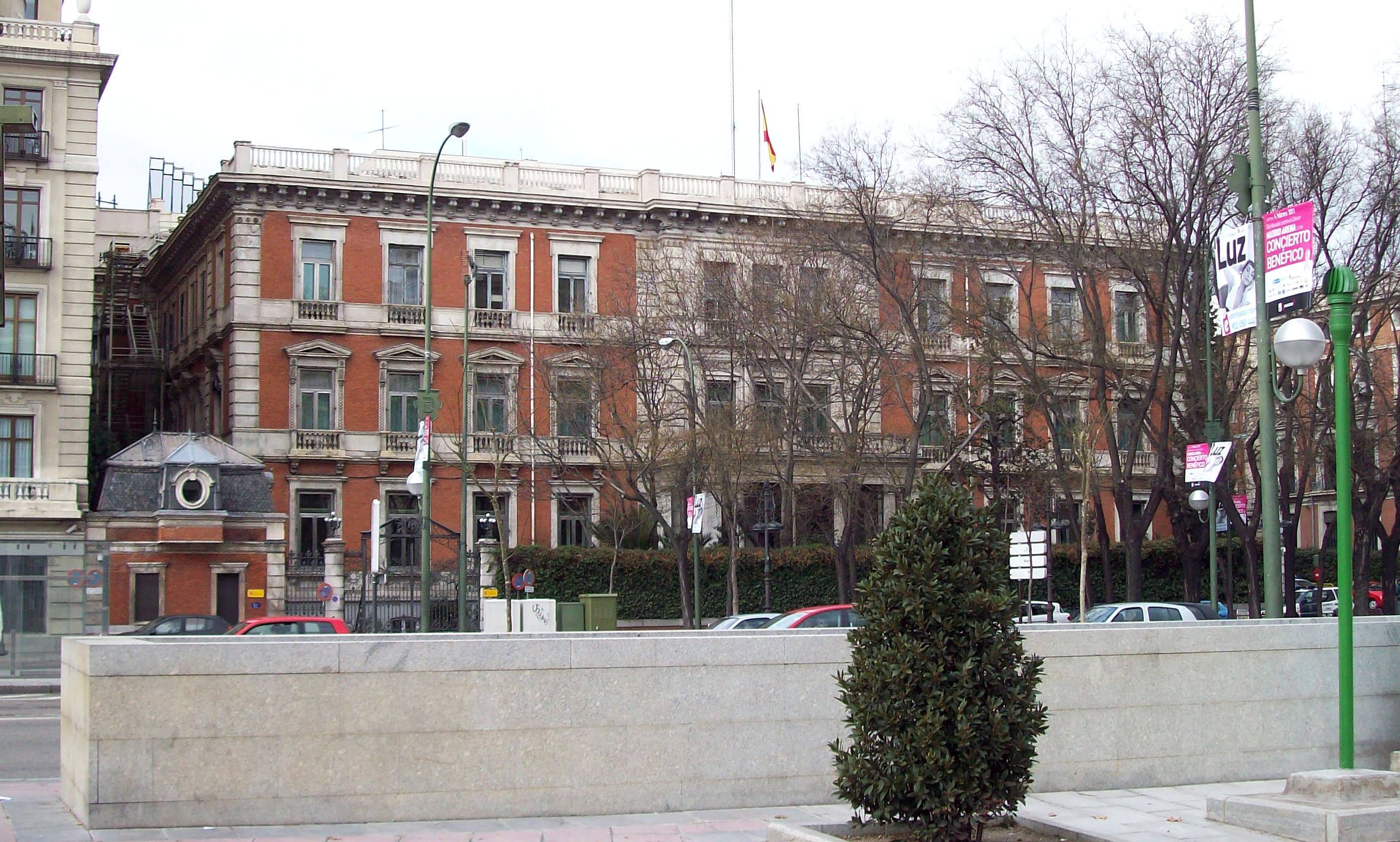
Palacio de Villamejor, located at number 3 Paseo de la Castellana, headquarters of the Presidency of the Government. The lying in repose of Admiral Carrero Blanco was held there.

Carrero Blanco's assassination triggered the most severe political crisis of the Franco regime, eliminating the individual designated to guarantee its continuity. Foreign Minister Laureano López Rodó later reflected, "I realized that his death marked the end of the Franco regime… Franco, without Carrero, was a different Franco." Minister Gonzalo Fernández de la Mora similarly asserted that ETA "could not have dealt a harder blow to the continuity of the State of 18 July. ETA's own proclamation noted that "Carrero guaranteed the stability and continuity of Franco's regime." According to historian Julio Gil Pecharromán:

With Luis Carrero Blanco died the dauphin, the figure of Franco's utmost trust, destined to ensure the continuity of the dictatorship. Also disappeared a military man with great prestige in the Armed Forces and a politician who not only seemed capable of imposing himself over the division within the Movement's ranks—including the ultras—but also of preventing the succession in the Head of State from altering, in a reformist sense, the markedly continuist course based on the principle of "everything tied up and well tied." In a way, that 20 December marked the beginning of the Transition.

In his customary New Year's address ten days later, Franco, alluding to the assassination, stated: "There is no evil that does not come with some good", a phrase interpreted by Tusell as recognition that Carrero's death eliminated his government team, necessitating major personnel changes. Carrero Blanco's assassination also influenced the "process 1001" trial, leading the Public Order Tribunal to impose severe prison sentences, including up to twenty years for repeat offenders. On 6 January 1974, during the Epiphany Military Review, Franco, referring to Carrero's death, described terrorism as "a new form of war" employed by Marxism, exploiting what he termed "a weak Europe."

== Final Crisis of Francoism (1974–75) ==
As observed a few months subsequent to Franco's death by Jorge de Esteban and Luis López Guerra, "the structural incapacity of the Spanish state to address the exigencies of modern life became painfully manifest during the biennium 1974–1975, attributable to the global crisis resulting, inter alia, from the abrupt escalation in energy costs."

=== Government of Carlos Arias Navarro and the "Spirit of 12 February" ===
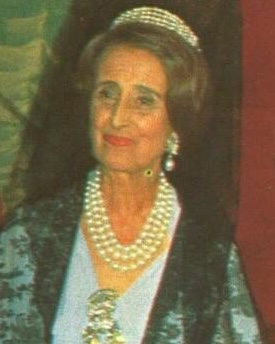
Carmen Polo de Franco, wife of the Generalissimo. In the final years of his life, Franco's family circle exerted increasing influence over him.

Influenced by his familial entourage, Franco appointed Carlos Arias Navarro as President of the Government in January 1974, effectively marginalizing the technocrats of Opus Dei definitively. According to Jorge de Esteban and Luis López Guerra, upon their exclusion from power "it was already manifest that the technocratic model of pseudo-partial modernization was leading to an impasse... The reality is that they pursued economic development, yet eschewed its social and political ramifications."

To constitute his administration, Arias Navarro turned to the "families" of the regime, endeavoring to preserve a certain equilibrium between "immobilists" and "reformists" (among the latter were Pío Cabanillas and Antonio Barrera de Irimo as heads of the Ministries of Information and Tourism and Finance, respectively; among the former, the "ultras" José Utrera Molina and Francisco Ruiz Jarabo, Minister-Secretary General of the Movement and Minister of Justice, respectively). The civilian and military involutionist factions, spearheaded by the President of the Cortes, Alejandro Rodríguez de Valcárcel, exerted pressure upon Arias Navarro to appoint the camisa vieja and former minister José Antonio Girón de Velasco as Vice President of the Government, but Arias demurred (it appears Franco even contemplated designating Girón as president of the government). Conversely, Franco cultivated a close ("paternal," according to Paul Preston) rapport with the "ultra" minister Utrera Molina. In January 1974, when Utrera informed him of his intention to ideologically rearm the Movement, Franco responded: "On many occasions, we have erred by lowering our guard."

Nevertheless, Arias Navarro lacked a coherent personal political vision. Initially, he appeared to diverge from "immobilist" stances, and in the address presenting the new government to the Francoist Cortes on 12 February 1974, he articulated certain "opening" commitments—political associations "within" the National Movement, "organic" election of mayors and provincial council presidents, and legal recognition of labor disputes. Arias Navarro spoke of perpetuating the "perfective continuity" of the regime, seeking the "widening of participation channels" and "new formulas to give political projection to the real pluralism of our society." For the first time in Francoism, the "Crusade" was designated as a "civil war," though it was also affirmed that "the legitimacy of 18 July is not subject to reinterpretation or debate." According to Paul Preston, the discourse was crafted by two members of the "reformist" cohort Tácito, Gabriel Cisneros and Luis Jáudenes, at the direction of their superior, the "opening" Minister of the Presidency Antonio Carro, who had also positioned other group members as undersecretaries across various ministries. According to Luis Suárez Fernández, the text was composed by Antonio Carro and Pío Cabanillas and finalized by Cisneros.

Furthermore, owing to the policy of Information and Tourism Minister Pío Cabanillas—a figure closely aligned with Manuel Fraga Iribarne, whose inclusion in the government was vetoed by General Franco—the press enjoyed enhanced latitude for critique, and the "moderate" opposition was "tolerated" (the Christian democrats Joaquín Ruiz Giménez and Fernando Álvarez de Miranda; the liberals Joaquín Satrústegui and Joaquín Garrigues Walker; the social democrat Dionisio Ridruejo; and the socialists Enrique Tierno Galván and Felipe González). "These were moments of significant dissemination and influence of manifestly democratic opinion periodicals, such as Cambio 16 or Triunfo, and newspapers like Ya, Informaciones, Tele/eXprés, or Diario de Barcelona." Conversely, Pío Cabanillas faced censure from the "ultras" for being photographed donning a barretina during a visit to Barcelona, where he had journeyed to deliver two addresses advocating the regime's "opening," eliciting a highly critical editorial in the Movement's official newspaper Arriba.

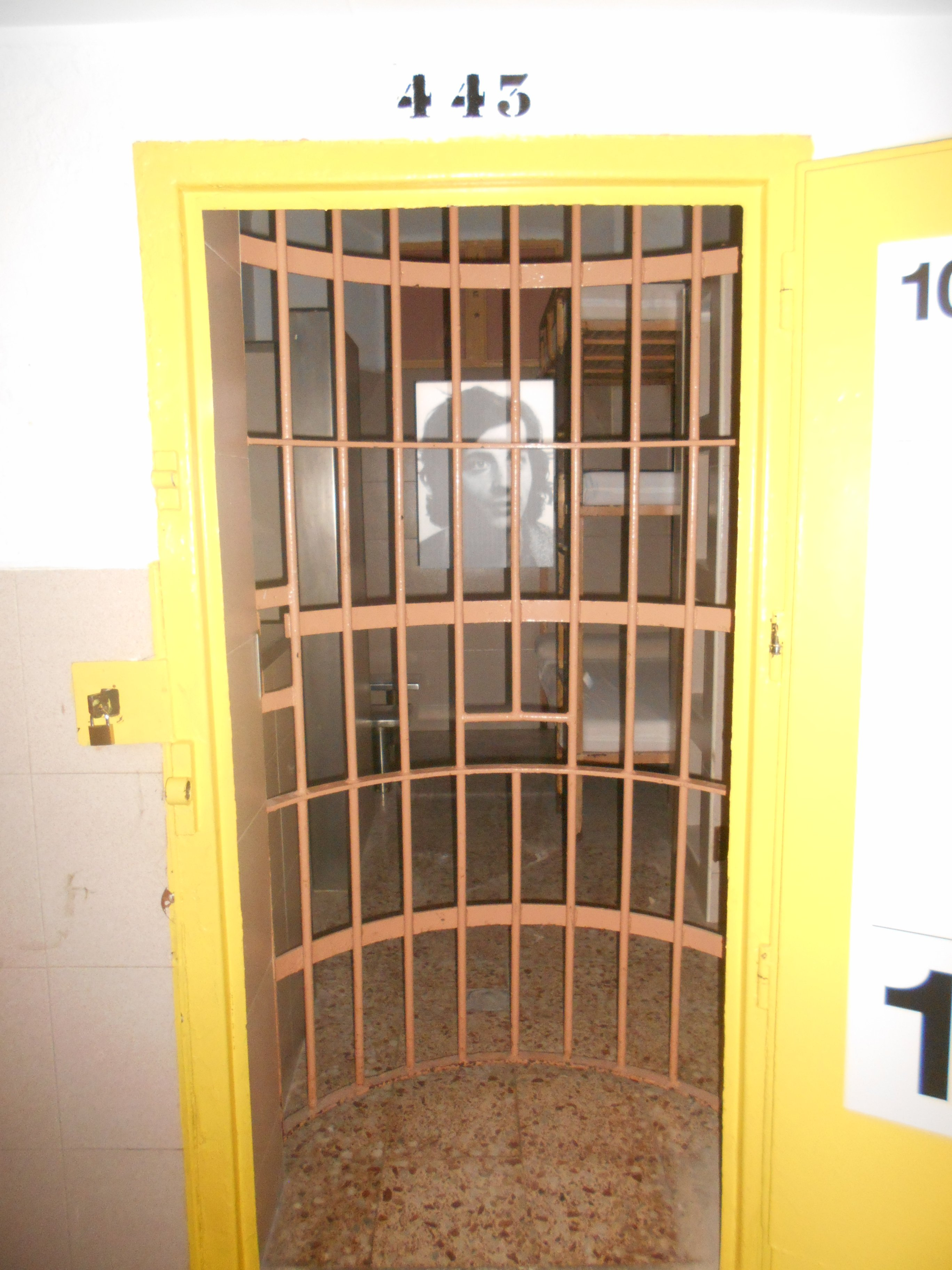
Cell in the Model Prison, Barcelona where Salvador Puig Antich was incarcerated prior to his execution by garrote vil.

However, this novel "Spirit of 12 February", as the press denominated it, endured for a mere fortnight (indeed, when the "ultra" Utrera Molina elucidated to Franco the implications of the "Spirit of 12 February," the alarmed leader remarked that "if the regime permits its substantial doctrine to be assailed and its servants fail to defend what is fundamental, one must contemplate a cowardly inclination toward suicide"). By the month's end, the Bishop of Bilbao, Monsignor Antonio Añoveros Ataún, was directed to depart Spain for having endorsed a sermon advocating the "just freedom" of the Basque people and a political system respectful of their "specific identity." The government adjudged the pastoral letter a "grave assault on national unity." Cardinal Tarancón and the Episcopal Conference upheld Monsignor Añoveros and contested the government's authority to expel a bishop, threatening excommunication for any individual issuing such a directive. Pope Paul VI supported Tarancón and Añoveros, and Franco himself ultimately intervened to instruct Arias Navarro to relent. "The incident was construed as a political setback for the government, which had been compelled to yield to the resolute stance of the Church and the Holy See," observes Borja de Riquer. That the government had descended into "ridicule," as the "technocrat" Laureano López Rodó recorded in his memoirs, or had committed "a misstep" and failed "the test of strength," as the "reformist" Manuel Fraga Iribarne noted, was substantiated by the fact that three ministers teetered on the brink of resignation.

On 2 March, mere days following the onset of the "Añoveros case", the anarchist Catalan Salvador Puig Antich, condemned to death by a court-martial for causing a policeman's death, was executed by garrote vil (alongside the "Polish" Heinz Chez, accused of slaying a Civil Guard officer), notwithstanding protests rigorously suppressed by police and pleas for clemency from across the globe (including Pope Paul VI). In the preceding weeks, "ultra" constituencies had pressured the government against commuting the sentence, also attributing to it the fortification of the anti-Francoist opposition and the public disturbances that had transpired. The death penalty had not been enforced in Spain since 1966. The international outcry over Puig Antich's case resonated with those provoked by the "Burgos trials" (1970) and the trial and execution of Julián Grimau (1963).

The anachronism and isolation of Francoism became conspicuous when, on 25 April 1974, a military coup prevailed in Portugal, terminating the Salazarist dictatorship, the eldest in Europe (and three months thereafter, the Greek military junta collapsed). "Personalized dictatorships appeared not to endure beyond their founders" (António de Oliveira Salazar had perished in 1970). One of the government's initial actions was to confiscate the special edition of the periodical Cuadernos para el Diálogo dedicated to the events in Portugal (the cover headline proclaimed: "Portugal, the end of a dictatorship"). For their part, the "ultra Francoists" promptly warned that the occurrences in Portugal would never transpire in Spain and denounced the "false liberals infiltrated" within the state, assailing the press's "opening" and the draft legislation on Movement associations.

=== Offensive of the "Bunker" ===
Francoist coat of arms. The "bunker" initiated an offensive against the "Spirit of 12 February" following the collapse of the Salazarist dictatorship in Portugal.

On 28 April 1974, the newspaper Arriba published an article by the former Falangist minister José Antonio Girón de Velasco, a preeminent figure within the "bunker," denouncing Arias Navarro's "opening" as a "betrayal" of the Principles of the National Movement. (In an effort to compel his dismissal, Girón had personally informed Franco that "Arias had betrayed the regime"). This was termed the "gironazo." In the article, Girón de Velasco invoked the Francoist triumph in the Civil War to vigorously oppose any alteration:

What is intended in the name of some strange freedom is to forget the sacred commitment we made to the Spanish people, we who one day found ourselves in the inescapable duty to take up arms and saw our best comrades die so that Spain might live. To forget this... would constitute a betrayal on our part, and on the part of those who incite us with their actions to do so, a crime we will not forgive. We proclaim the right to wield against the red flags the flags of hope and realities we raised on 18 July 1936, even if opposed by false liberals or those who, infiltrated in the Administration or spheres of power, dream of the shameful ringing of the bell for the liquidation at auction of the Regime of Francisco Franco...

The "gironazo" elicited widespread approbation from all "ultra" constituencies (Fuerza Nueva endorsed the thesis of preserving the memory of the "sacrifice of the dead"), and Girón faced no dismissal from his positions on the Council of the Realm nor the National Council of the Movement, an omission interpreted as tacit endorsement by Franco. On the same day Girón's article appeared in Arriba, Nuevo Diario published an interview with Lieutenant General Tomás García Rebull, another prominent "ultra," wherein he asserted that "as a Falangist, I do not accept associations of any kind" because "associations inevitably lead to political parties, and for me, parties are the opium of the people, and politicians their vampires." He further alleged that behind Carrero Blanco's assassination lay Freemasonry. When pressed for evidence, he replied: "Well... based on what I see. Many times I wonder: but where does this come from? And I always say: nothing, Freemasonry. I even think we've exported Freemasons." Evidently, García Rebull's article formed part of a stratagem by "ultra" generals for Carlos Iniesta Cano, on the verge of retirement, to succeed the "liberal" Manuel Díez Alegría as Chief of the Joint Chiefs of Staff and for Ángel Campano to assume the Directorate-General of the Civil Guard vacated by Iniesta Cano. This plan was to be followed by a purge of all officers suspected of liberalism. Upon being apprised by the Army Minister Francisco Coloma Gallegos of the scheme, the government president visited Franco to intervene or tender his resignation. "Franco, who regarded military regulations and seniority as sacrosanct priorities, supported Arias, and Iniesta was compelled to retire at the designated time, 12 May," affirmed Paul Preston.

A few days subsequent to the "gironazo," Gonzalo Fernández de la Mora, the ideologue of the "technocrat" immobilists, likened Arias Navarro to General Dámaso Berenguer whose government "had confined itself to observing the dissolution of the state and its gradual replacement by what was advocated, not by the country, but by frivolous minorities or those resentful of the [Miguel Primo de Rivera] Dictatorship" in ABC. Concurrently, Blas Piñar in his contributions to Fuerza Nueva branded the "aperturists" as "traitors" and accused the government of feebleness against "subversion." At a public gathering convened at Fuerza Nueva's headquarters, he surpassed Girón's rhetoric, declaring that "despite the war communiqué that led to the laying down of arms, the war has not concluded, and peace, regrettably, commences never and must be secured through everyone's endeavor."

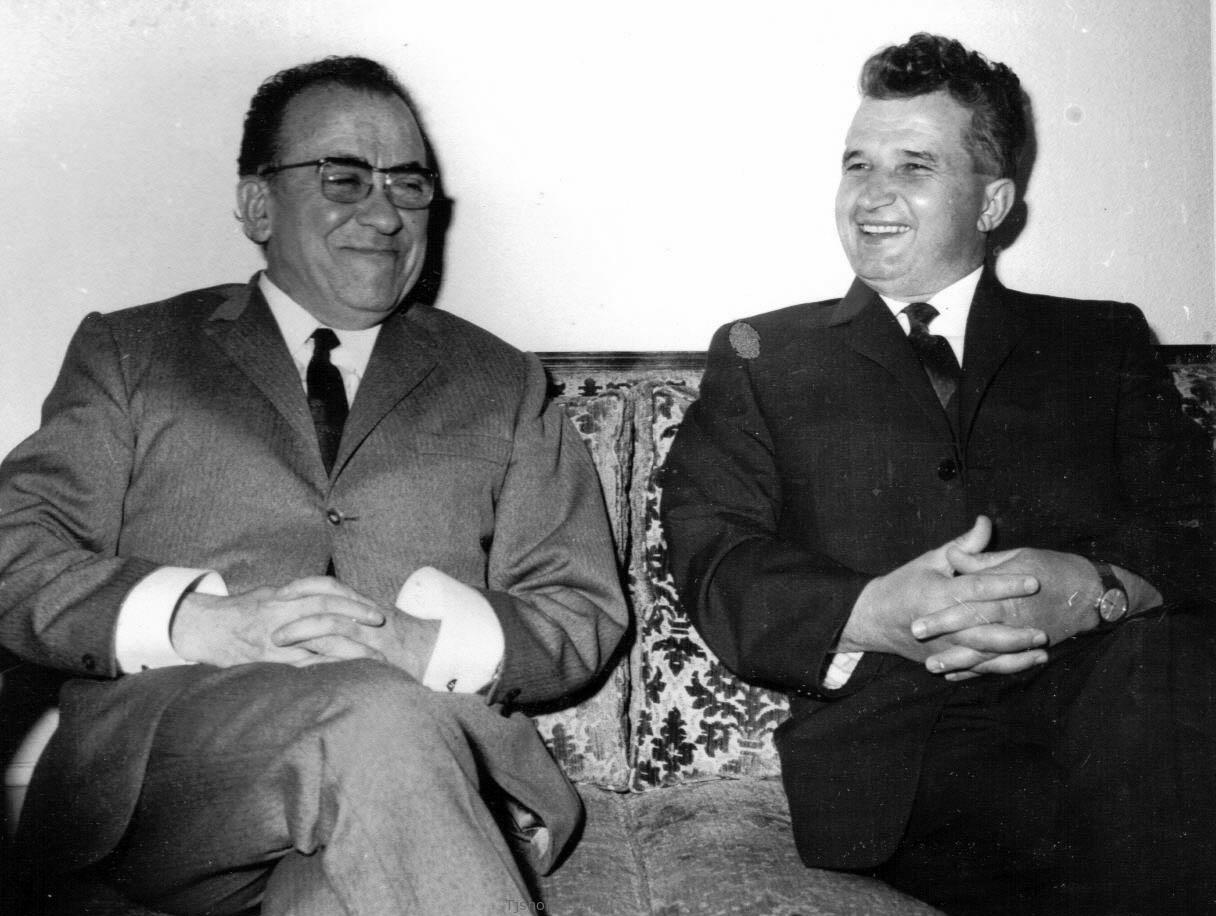
The communist Romanian dictator Nicolae Ceaușescu with Santiago Carrillo, Secretary General of the Communist Party of Spain. The interview with Ceaușescu in Bucharest by the Chief of the Joint Chiefs of Staff, Lieutenant General Manuel Díez Alegría, precipitated his dismissal. Díez Alegría declined to meet with Carrillo.

Two months following Girón's article in Arriba, the Chief of the Joint Chiefs of Staff, Lieutenant General Manuel Díez Alegría, regarded as a "liberal" ("a clear representative of the army's more professional and less political sector"), was relieved of his command after an official sojourn to Romania where he had conferred with the communist dictator Nicolae Ceaușescu, who maintained close associations with Santiago Carrillo, Secretary General of the clandestine and illegal Communist Party of Spain (with whom Díaz Alegría refused to convene). Franco expressed irritation upon learning of the trip. "The dismissal transpired, in a manner, under the influence of the Portuguese events, that is, out of an exaggerated apprehension that Díez Alegría might emerge as a new António de Spínola (one of the military figures who led the transition in the neighboring country), following an article in El Alcázar by a writer concealing his identity under the pseudonym 'Jerjes'" launched a severe critique against him." Indeed, Díez Alegría had begun receiving monocles as gifts, akin to those employed by General Spínola. A few days prior, the "ultra" minister Utrera Molina had advocated the necessity to "ideologically rearm the system against the offensive of a distorting and dissolving thought and the reality of growing subversion." The subsequent year, military intelligence apprehended eleven officers accused of leading the Democratic Military Union (UMD), a clandestine military organization established in August 1974 in Barcelona that, emulating the Portuguese model, sought to enlist younger army officers in support of a democratic transformation in Spain—but its scope remained exceedingly limited and secured the allegiance of approximately two hundred fifty lieutenants, captains, and commanders. Among those detained were the apparent UMD leaders, Commanders Julio Busquets and Luis Otero. The "precipitate wave of denials of any significance" to the matter proved highly revealing. More forthright was the Chief of the Joint Chiefs of Staff, Lieutenant General Carlos Fernández Vallespín, who declared that "to address the crux of the matter, since the Portuguese revolt, there have been elements dreaming of staging a 25 April here."

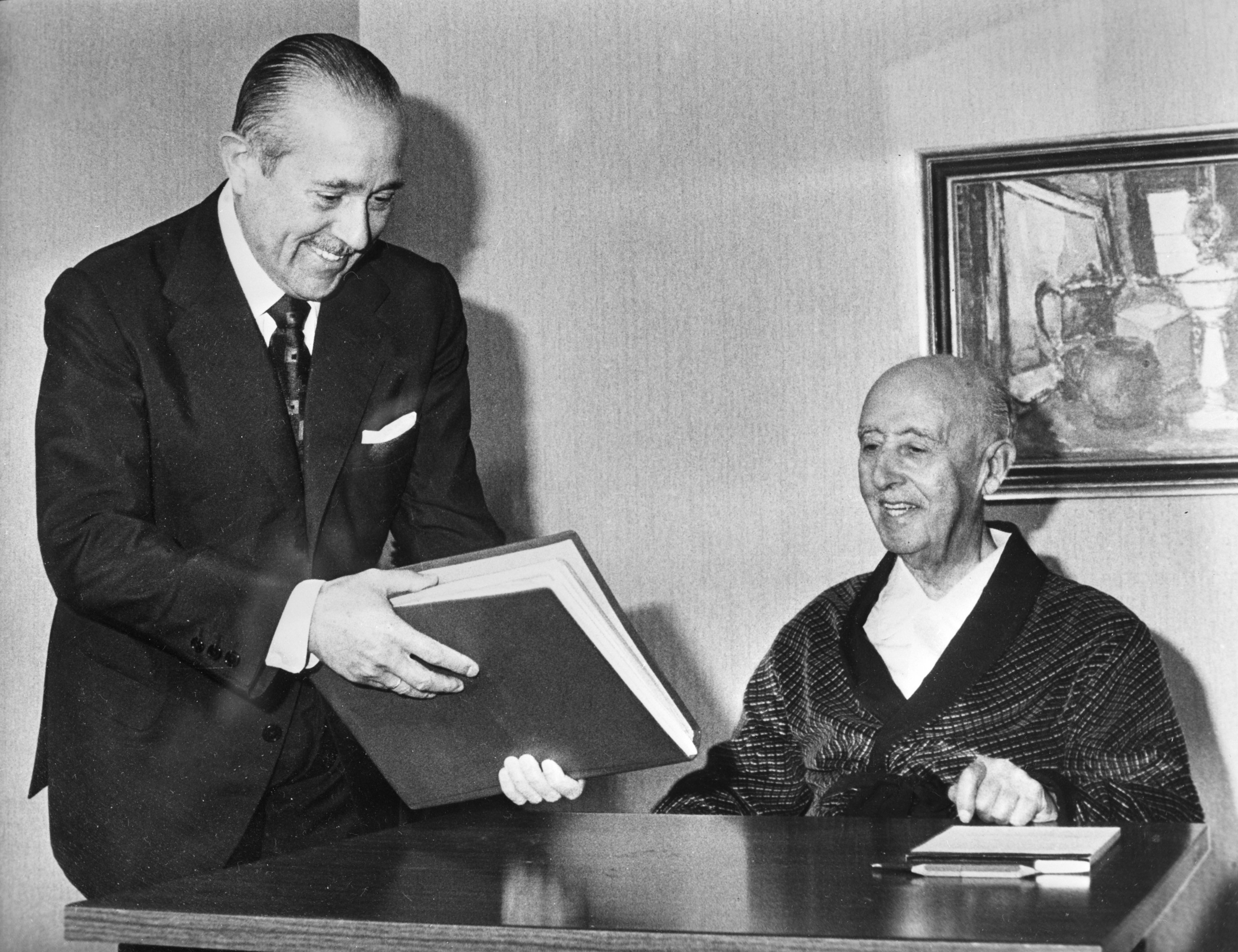
The government president Carlos Arias Navarro visits General Franco. The photograph is dated 23 October 1975 but may correspond to a visit from the previous year when Franco was hospitalized.

The perception that one was witnessing the terminal crisis of Francoism intensified in July 1974 when General Franco was admitted to hospital due to thrombophlebitis, necessitating the temporary delegation of his powers to Prince Juan Carlos (who would assume the Head of State role for forty-six days). The decision by Franco's personal physician Vicente Gil to hospitalize him provoked the displeasure of the Caudillo's son-in-law, who was not consulted (the Marquis of Villaverde, also a physician, was in the Philippines at the time for professional reasons and had also attended the Miss World pageant). His life was deemed imperiled, and a priest administered the last rites. Yet he recuperated and on 15 August departed the hospital to spend several days recuperating at the Pazo de Meirás. On the 28th, he received the "ultra" minister Utrera Molina, who spoke of purported plans to incapacitate him, rendering it imperative to reclaim his authority. Franco concurred (characterizing it as a "miserable pretension") and responded: "I am not a dictator clinging to not losing prerogatives, but it is not the first time Spain has demanded my sacrifice. After a prudent interval and the corrections I deem urgent, I will reconsider my decision. [...] Do not forget that, in the final instance, the Army will defend its victory" (Utrera also alluded to the possibility of Juan Carlos introducing radical changes post-mortem, to which Franco rejoined: "When I die, everything will be different, but there are oaths that bind"). On 30 August, following a Council of Ministers convened at the Pazo de Meirás under Juan Carlos's presidency, the Interior Minister José García Hernández advised Franco: "My general, it is time to alleviate your responsibilities and entrust the helm to other hands." "You know that is not feasible," Franco replied. Three days thereafter, the re-assumption of his powers was publicly announced. Prince Juan Carlos received the news while dining in Mallorca with his father, Don Juan de Borbón, and others, and expressed irritation at the manner of its execution and the absence of prior notification. In the background loomed the crisis unfolding in the Spanish Sahara colony due to Hassan II's intention to annex it into Morocco (he had designated 1974 as the year of "Sahara liberation"). This constituted one of the rationales Franco later cited for reclaiming his authority.

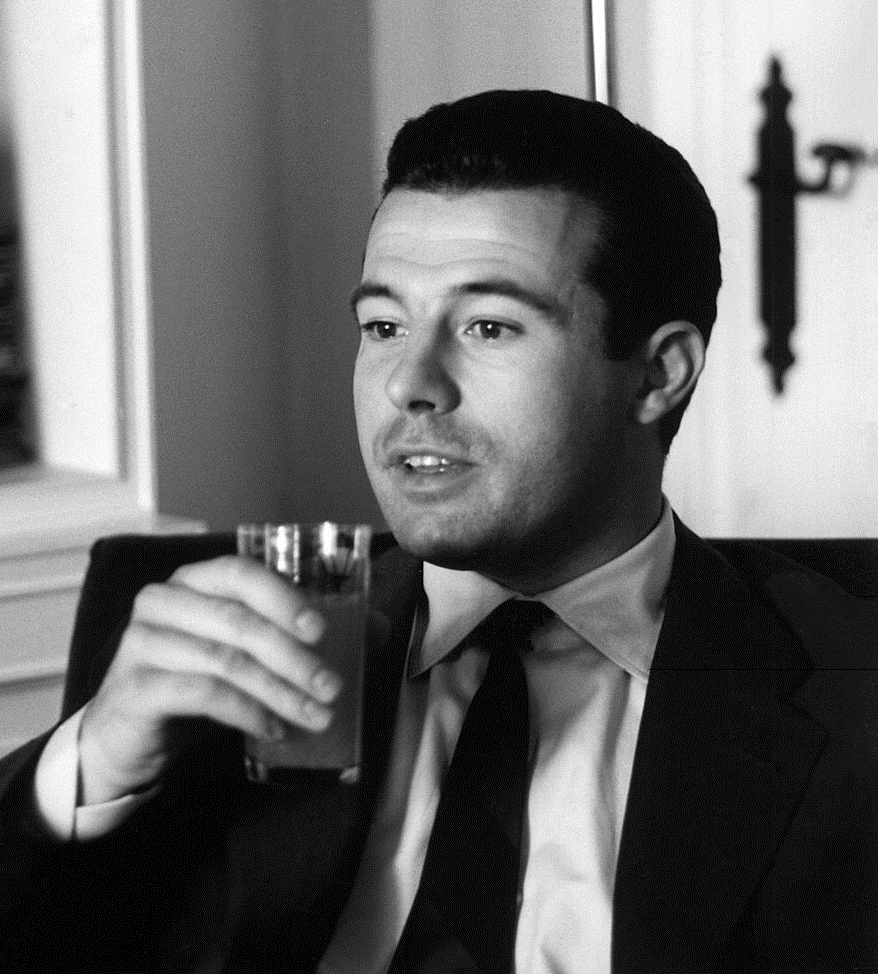
The Duke of Cádiz (title conferred by Franco) Alfonso de Borbón Dampierre, wed to Franco's eldest granddaughter María del Carmen Martínez-Bordiu y Franco, in 1963. His unwavering allegiance to the Francoist regime rendered him a candidate for the "ultras" to persuade Franco to revoke his 1969 designation of Prince Juan Carlos as his successor. The alternative of Don Alfonso also garnered the support of the Generalissimo's family.

During the two months of his convalescence, the "ultras" once again advanced the candidacy of Alfonso de Borbón y Dampierre, married to Franco's eldest granddaughter, thereby also enjoying familial backing (the law permitted the Generalissimo to rescind his 1969 decision in favor of Juan Carlos). Indeed, the Marquis of Villaverde, Don Alfonso's father-in-law, remarked to Vicente Gil, who had insisted Franco sign the temporary cession of the Head of State role: "What a poor service you have rendered my father-in-law! What a fine service you have done that little boy Juanito!" (the Marquis ensured Vicente Gil's replacement by Dr. Vicente Pozuelo Escudero as Franco's personal physician; one of Pozuelo's initial decisions was to officially disclose that Franco suffered from Parkinson's disease). Meanwhile, the French, German, and British ambassadors apprised their respective governments that they discerned no prospect for the dictatorship's continuity post-Franco's demise, having initiated contacts with the moderate democratic opposition. The regime's sole remaining ally was the United States, keenly interested in renewing the military bases treaty and ensuring Spain's stability following the Caudillo's departure, banking on the continuity that Juan Carlos's monarchy would afford.

Logo of the "ultra" faction Fuerza Nueva, which vehemently opposed any endeavor toward "opening" Francoism.

On 13 September, shortly after resuming his powers, a savage ETA assault claimed 12 lives—wounding over 80—all civilians. They had planted a bomb in the Rolando café on Madrid's Correo Street, proximate to the Puerta del Sol, a locale frequented by police from the nearby Directorate-General of Security. Franco commented to his physician upon hearing the tidings: "either we end them, or they will end us." The Rolando café bombing was exploited by the extreme right to exert pressure on the government, whose president defended himself by critiquing the attitude of "certain sectors, prone to clinging to nostalgia." Blas Piñar, leader of Fuerza Nueva, responded with an article entitled "Mr. President," published on 27 September in the magazine of the same name (then of limited circulation), stating (it was dubbed the "piñarazo" for its resemblance to the "gironazo" of 28 April):

Mr. President, we exclude ourselves from your policy. [...] We cannot, after what you have said, collaborate with you, not even in opposition... We do not want to obey or accompany you. But take note of those who accompany you and where they lead you. Consider whether they guide or push you. And do not lament at the end if you see that this type of democratization you so urgently seek rises upon a legion of corpses, of which those pulled from the rubble on 13 September, from the very heart of Spain's capital, are a preview and advance when that democratization begins.

A few weeks thereafter, the National Confederation of Ex-Combatants, presided over by Girón, presented its members as "combatants of Spain." "We proceed from the irrevocable fact of 18 July 1936... We are not ex-combatants. We are combatants of Spain and the national revolution. [...] For all this, we aspire for the political regime to which we are loyal to fulfill its revolutionary commitment. In this order, peace is attainable. But without justice, peace is neither attainable nor desirable." On 16 November, Girón himself, on behalf of the Confederation, again employed threatening rhetoric: "We bear the same responsibility that, for reasons of honor, drove us to the mountains in 1936. [...] We are compelled by the duty to obstruct those who seek to wrest our victory." On 27 November, Franco received them at the Palacio de El Pardo, with Girón at the forefront, and the Caudillo addressed them: "You are on active duty and in active service, and you are rendering the Fatherland a most significant service, namely the vigilance of peace, the confirmation of this peace, and national unity." He counseled them: "Close ranks, keep them intact, preserve your combative spirit."

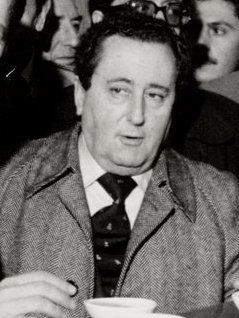
Pío Cabanillas in 1979. Pressure from the bunker accelerated his dismissal as Minister of Information and Tourism on 29 October 1974.

The bunker's pressure precipitated the "reformist" Pío Cabanillas' dismissal on 29 October (to "balance" his administration, Arias Navarro attempted to have the "ultra" ministers Utrera Molina and Ruiz Jarabo removed as well, but Franco demurred because both were "very loyal"). It was rumored that the "ultras" had presented Franco with an extensive dossier featuring photographs of women in bikinis from Spanish periodicals ingeniously intermingled with erotic foreign magazine images, alongside details on the Reace case, in which Nicolás Franco was implicated, for which the minister was held accountable. This latter point purportedly irked Franco the most. "What utility is there in everyone asserting Cabanillas is very clever if he could not prevent my brother's name from appearing in the press? I do not wish to see Cabanillas in a Council of Ministers again," he is alleged to have remarked. Cabanillas' departure from the government precipitated an unprecedented occurrence in Francoism, as in solidarity, "reformist" minister Antonio Barrera de Irimo and several senior administration officials of the same inclination resigned, many of whom would emerge as prominent figures in the democratic transition (Francisco Fernández Ordóñez, Marcelino Oreja, Juan Antonio Ortega y Díaz-Ambrona, Juan José Rosón, etc.). "There is no doubt that Cabanillas' replacement, which dragged along an entire team, was Franco's own decision," asserts Luis Suárez Fernández. Subsequent to Pío Cabanillas' exit from the Ministry of Information and Tourism, the government's policy toward the press stiffened, frequently invoking "its prerogatives to suspend a newspaper or demand the withdrawal of an article."

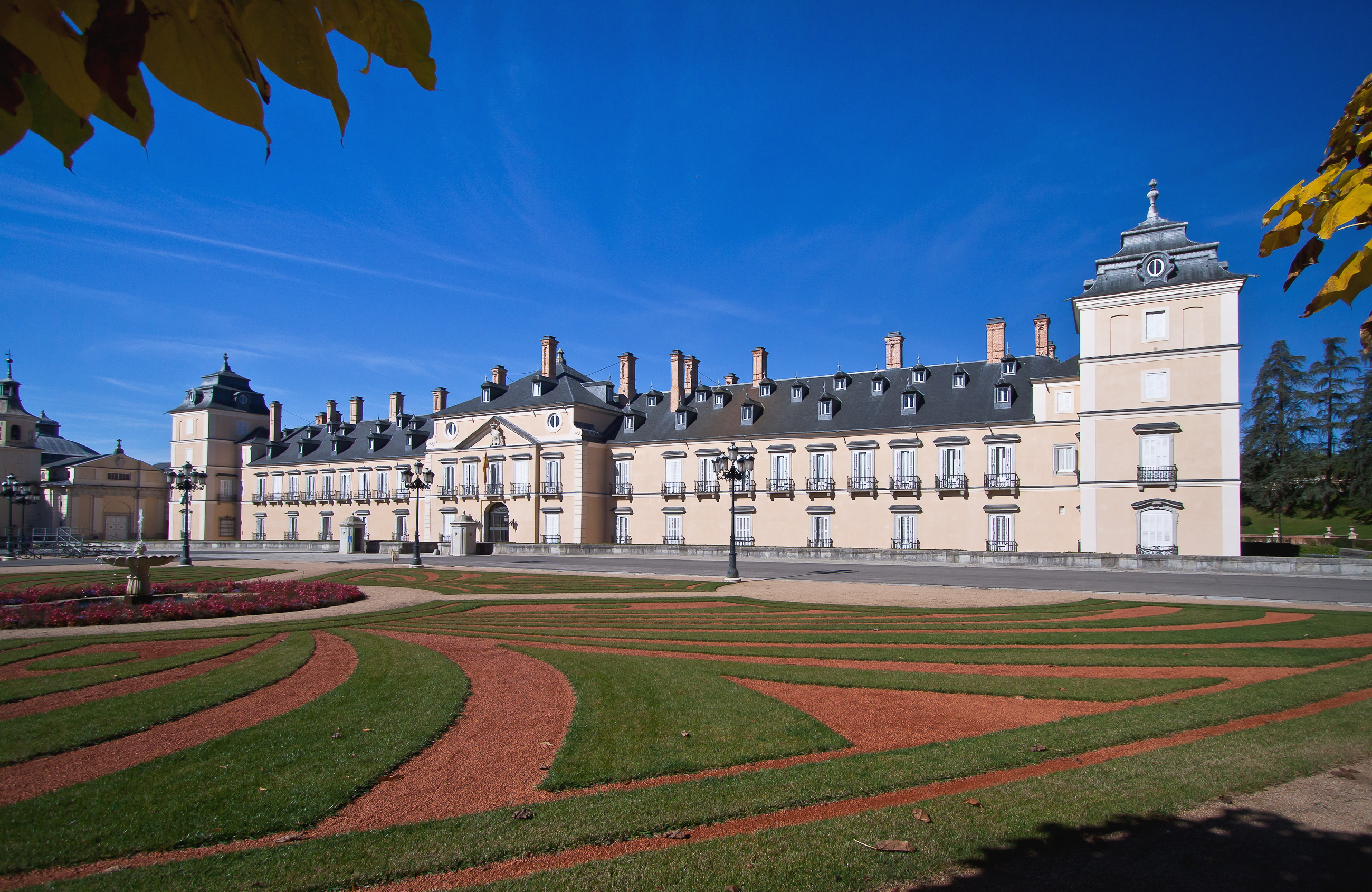
Palacio de El Pardo, the official residence of Generalissimo Franco

The dismissal of Cabanillas and the "cascade of resignations" that ensued, signified the termination of the "reformist" agenda during Franco's lifetime and affirmed the schism within the Francoist political elite, evident in December when political associations "within" the Movement received approval, as the majority of "reformists" rejected them. The ultimately ratified Associations Statute (on 16 December 1974, by 95 votes in favor and 3 abstentions) had been drafted by José Utrera Molina, who revived the project from a decade earlier by José Solís Ruiz, discarding Arias's "aperturist" Antonio Carro's proposal that did not provide for Movement oversight of associations. Moreover, the approved Statute prohibited associations from possessing a regional character, mandating support from at least 25,000 individuals residing in a minimum of 15 provinces. "To secure the text's approval, a very explicit sanction from Franco was requisite, evidence that, despite his condition, he remained the decisive and unappealable authority," affirmed Javier Tusell. Indeed, to dissuade him from the opposition he had expressed, a Note entitled Guarantees Contained in the Draft Statute of the Right to Political Association was presented, emphasizing that all its articles conformed "with the Principles of the National Movement and other Fundamental Laws." In his traditional New Year's message, Franco declared that the Associations opened "a new and hopeful prospect that will offer all Spaniards of good and clean intent the opportunity for more active political participation" and also invoked "the need to remain united." "We have progressed together in far more critical junctures than the present ones and have invariably surmounted them with an integrative will, with confidence, and, above all, with that faith and love for the Fatherland that made us forget everything to maintain, at all costs, unity."

The "ultras" also contested the associations for opposing reasons. On 20 December 1973, they convened a gathering before the Church of San Jerónimo el Real in Madrid, where a funeral for Carrero Blanco was being conducted, attended by Juan Carlos and the entire government. Participants voiced slogans such as "We do not desire an opening, we demand a firm hand!" and "Long live 18 July, down with 12 February!", accompanied by the customary "Tarancón to the wall!" (Arias Navarro was greeted upon his arrival with the cry "Butter, butter!"). In a televised address on 27 February 1975, subsequently renowned as the "little light of El Pardo" speech, President Arias Navarro conclusively interred the nascent "spirit" proclaimed a year prior:

To all those who might harbor doubts about possible weaknesses or discouragements, I would furnish them with the means to dispel their doubts forthwith: let them approach the El Pardo Palace. There persists a little light ever illuminated in the office of the Caudillo, where the man who has devoted his entire existence to the service of Spain remains, without mercy for himself, resolute at the helm, charting the course of the ship...

=== Impact of the "Oil Crisis" and the rise in social and political conflict ===
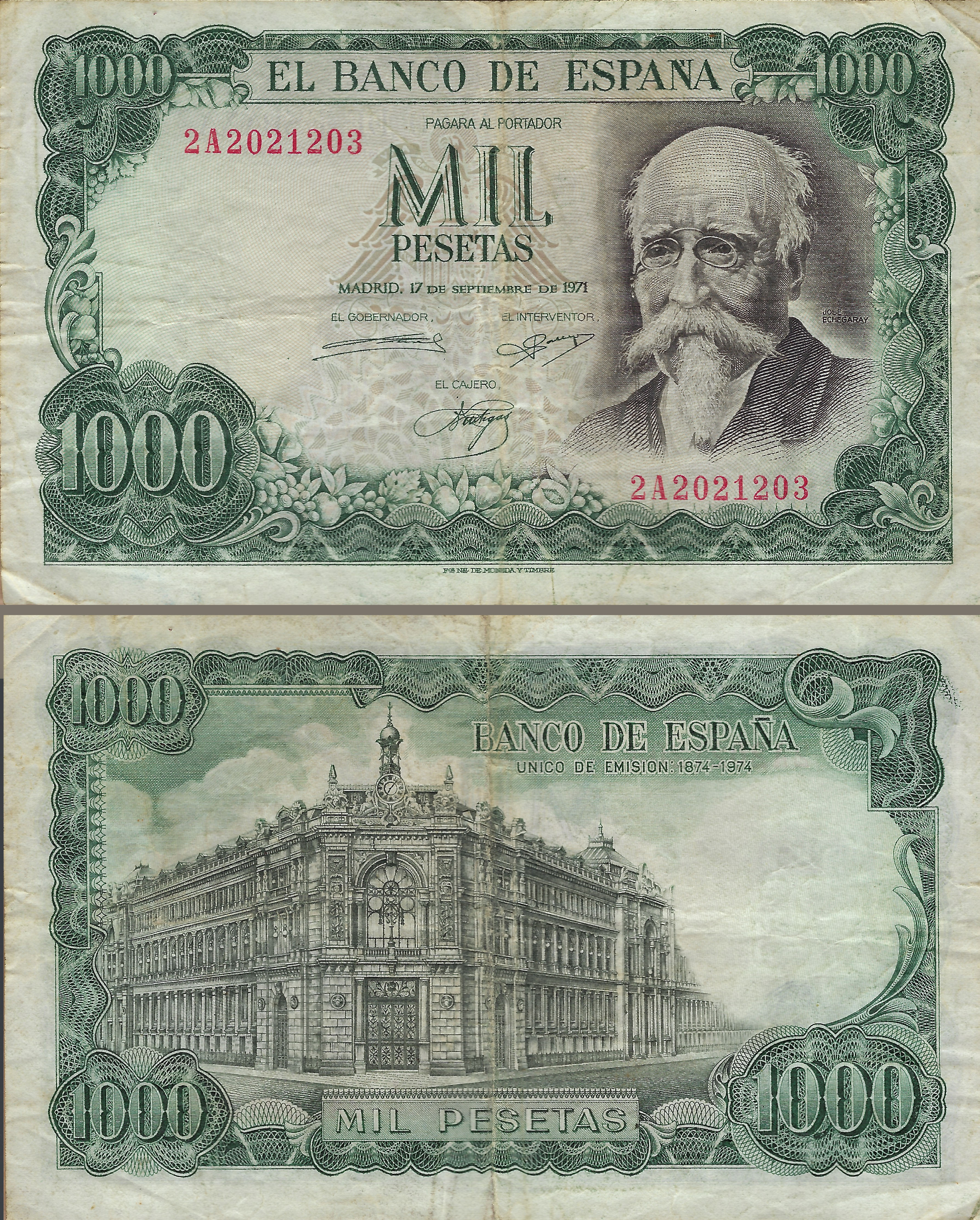
1000-peseta banknote issued in 1971

By late 1973, the international economic crisis, initially precipitated by a dramatic escalation in oil prices (from $3 to $11.6 per barrel), had commenced. However, the Arias Navarro administration confined itself to subsidizing gasoline and diesel prices to preclude the increase from impacting consumers. This measure failed to avert a 70% price surge and also contributed to an expanding trade deficit, already substantial, as oil imports continued to rise due to unabated consumption—unlike the European Economic Community countries, which had implemented energy-conservation measures. Furthermore, the balance of payments transitioned from a surplus of 500 million in 1973 to a deficit of 3,268 million in 1974, markedly diminishing foreign exchange reserves (tourism revenues had diminished, and foreign investments had declined). GDP growth decelerated (from 8% in 1973 to 5.7% in 1974 and 1.1% in 1975), and inflation ascended precipitously (from 11.2% in 1973—already double the OECD average—to 15.7% in 1974 and 17% in 1975), heralding the emergence of the economic phenomenon known as "stagflation". Moreover, as the crisis afflicted other European nations, numerous emigrants lost their employment and were compelled to return to Spain, augmenting unemployment. The government eschewed necessary adjustment measures "because they would have entailed freezing wages and increasing unemployment at a juncture when it required the greatest possible popularity," according to Luis Suárez Fernández.

The deteriorating economic circumstances translated into heightened social conflict. The incidence of strikes multiplied fivefold compared to 1970, notwithstanding the absence of legal recognition for the right to strike (according to official statistics, there were 2,290 strikes in 1974 and 3,156 in 1975, the highest tally in Francoist history). However, strikers not only sought wage increments or improved working conditions but increasingly demanded trade union freedom, acknowledgment of the right to strike, and cessation of dismissals and repression (approximately 25,000 workers lost their positions in 1974 for supporting strikes, while others faced arrest and imprisonment for "illegal activities"). Solidarity strikes with other workers in dispute with their employers were commonplace. General strikes also transpired in specific cities (such as Pamplona in January 1975 in solidarity with workers at Potasas de Navarra), regions (like the Baix Llobregat in July and December 1974), or provinces (on 11 December 1974 in Vizcaya and Guipúzcoa). Strikes were frequently accompanied by other forms of mobilization, such as workplace occupations; assemblies and lock-ins in churches, universities, and Vertical Syndicate facilities; protest marches; hunger strikes; and so forth. They garnered support from diverse social sectors (public declarations, recitation of manifestos, alternative concerts or popular festivals, etc.). Internal reports from Francoist authorities expressed apprehension. One from the Barcelona civil government noted: "Opposition groups, though small compared to the working masses, are increasingly empowered among their peers and exert growing influence." The sole response they deemed effective was repression: between 1969 and 1975, twenty workers perished from gunfire by public order forces.

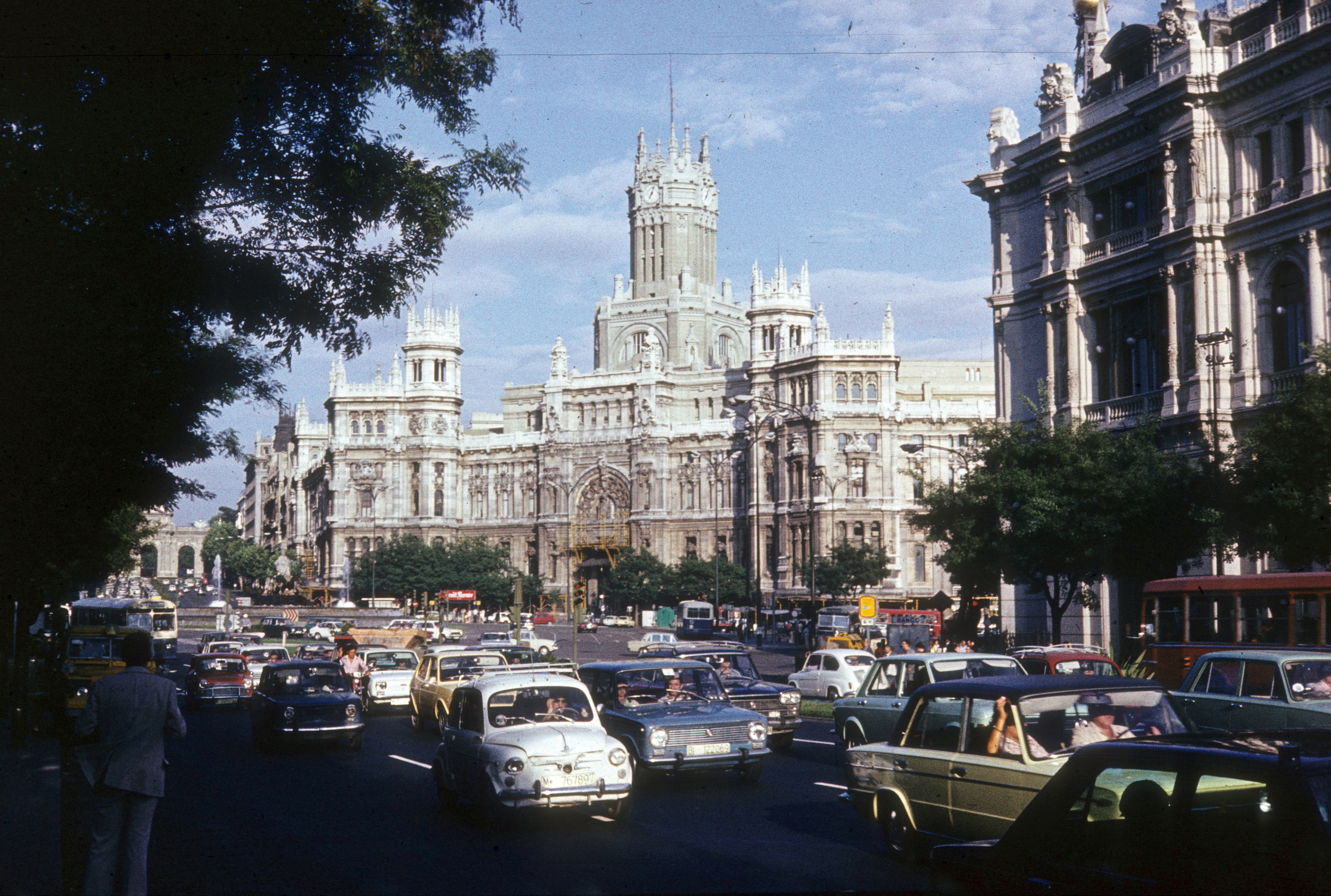
Downtown Madrid in 1974. The Carlos Arias Navarro government adopted no energy-saving measures in response to the 1973 oil crisis. Instead, it subsidized gasoline prices to forestall protests, resulting in unchanged oil imports and an augmented trade deficit.

Conflict was not confined to the labor sphere but also manifested in the university, neighborhood, professional, and cultural domains. The student movement amplified its activism to the extent that it has been asserted that the regime lost "the battle of the university." "The institution existed in perpetual abnormality, involving frequent police incursions into campuses and the closure of entire centers and universities, such as the indefinite closure of the University of Valladolid in February 1975." To this was added the movement of non-tenured professors (PNNs), who initiated a strike in early 1975, paralyzing academic life for the remainder of the 1974-1975 academic year. They demanded job stability, enhanced salaries, and participation in university governance to achieve genuine autonomy. The community association also gained traction, particularly in the neighborhoods of major cities and towns within their metropolitan areas, many of which still had half their streets unpaved. The number of community associations increased markedly, as did the protests and mobilizations they orchestrated, often aimed at securing democratic municipal governments (mayors were appointed directly or indirectly by the government). Numerous associations faced suspension for several months by governmental decree.

Professional associations also grew increasingly critical. Among them, the bar associations distinguished themselves, led by the Madrid Bar Association, presided over by Antonio Pedrol Rius, which called for a regime of freedoms and the establishment of a rule of law in Spain. As early as 1970, the Lawyers' Congress convened in León had articulated this demand. The associations of degree holders mobilized somewhat later, but in 1974, a candidacy sponsored by the clandestine Communist Party of Spain (PCE) and Spanish Socialist Workers' Party (PSOE) prevailed in the Madrid Association of Degree Holders.

The cultural sphere also witnessed notable mobilization. Intellectuals, artists, professors, actors, singers, and others led strikes and lock-ins, in addition to endorsing manifestos in favor of freedom. "They ventured to appear publicly as overt adversaries of the dictatorship, despite the risk of arrests, fines, and exclusion from public media (television, radio)." This was accompanied by a proliferation of publications and books advocating democracy, to the extent that "the process of cultural delegitimization of Francoism, already underway by the late 1960s, accelerated markedly in the 1970s, so that by the time of the dictator's death, democratic critical thought was clearly predominant in the realm of high culture. [...] In 1975, a genuine chasm existed between the culture of official Spain and the cultural patterns of authentic Spain."

A few months subsequent to Franco's demise, Jorge de Esteban and Luis López Guerra attributed the elevated level of social conflict, more so than to the economic crisis's impact, to

the lack of adaptation of state institutions to the current economic-social structure. A socially pluralistic, industrialized nation cannot be governed in the same manner as an economically underdeveloped, socially stagnant one... Hence, the failure to resolve key issues [the constitutional, Church-State relations, fiscal, social integration, regional integration, etc.] led to a deterioration in coexistence among Spaniards.

On the other hand, historians have deliberated to what extent the burgeoning labor and social conflict proved decisive in the ultimate crisis of the Francoist dictatorship. Borja de Riquer has posited that

the continuous transgression of legality and public order, the so-called 'subversion,' was addressed solely with repressive policies, which further augmented the political destabilization of the Arias Navarro government. In this manner, social mobilization exerted a highly decisive influence on the final crisis of Francoism by deteriorating the government's and regime's image, both domestically and internationally, and increasing internal dissent, while also contributing to the anti-Francoist politicization of a segment of Spanish society.

=== Growth of the Anti-Francoist opposition ===
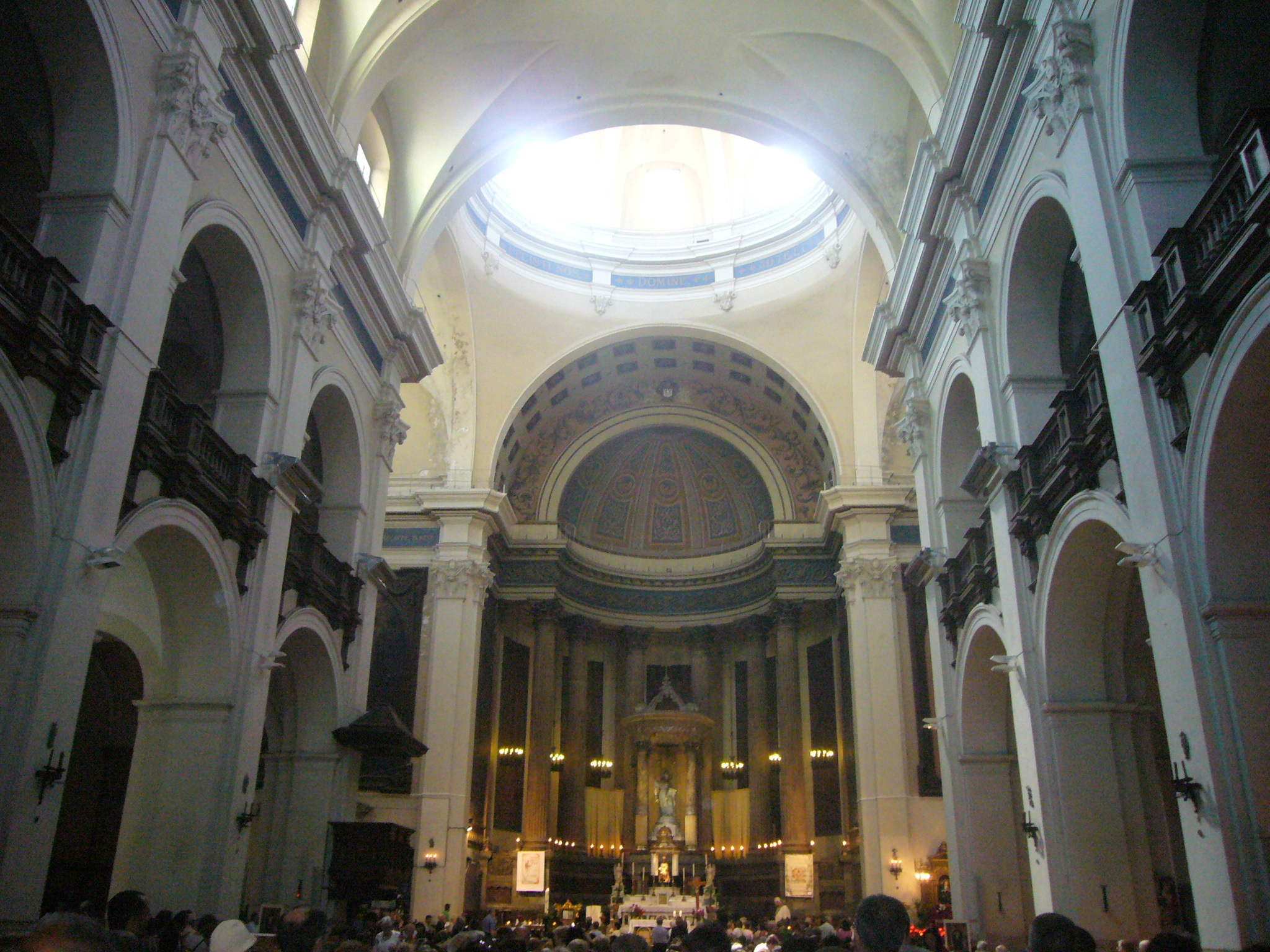
Interior of the Church of Sant Agustí in the El Raval neighborhood of Barcelona, where the Assembly of Catalonia was founded on 7 November 1971. The utilization of religious edifices by the anti-Francoist opposition constituted one of the reasons for the Francoist regime's conflict with the Catholic Church.

Although widespread political passivity persisted among the majority of the populace, fostered by decades of dictatorship, the significant escalation in social and political conflict—not merely among workers but also in universities, the cultural sphere, neighborhood settings, and even the Catholic ecclesiastical domain—"resulted in a noticeable expansion of the democratic opposition, which, despite persistent and severe government repression, augmented its social support." A 1974 survey revealed that 60% of respondents favored a democratically elected government. Evidence of the opposition's growth was the dramatic increase in cases adjudicated before the Public Order Tribunal, rising from 1,695 in 1972 to 2,382 in 1974 and 4,317 in 1975. Additionally, military courts processed 305 civilians between 1974 and 1975, all prosecuted for exercising freedoms of expression, association, and demonstration recognized in any democratic state. The organization Justice and Peace, led by Joaquín Ruiz Giménez, a former Francoist minister and founder of Cuadernos para el Diálogo, launched a campaign for amnesty. By 1974, it had amassed 160,000 signatures of support.

As Franco's death appeared increasingly imminent, the anti-Francoist opposition began to converge toward unifying their diverse proposals to terminate the dictatorship, a feat never accomplished in its history. The model largely emulated was that of the Assembly of Catalonia, a unitary platform established in Barcelona in November 1971, which united all anti-Francoist Catalan parties and organizations, including communists (Unified Socialist Party of Catalonia in Catalonia). Its rallying cry, "Freedom, Amnesty, and Statute of Autonomy," was adopted by the broader opposition. By 1974, it was present in forty Catalan localities, with over one hundred groups and entities joining (in fact, the arrest of its Permanent Commission members—113 individuals in October 1973 and 67 in September 1974—did not debilitate it, enabling it to promote campaigns such as "Why the 1932 Statute" or "We Want Democratic Municipalities").

Poster of the Democratic Junta, founded in Paris in July 1974.

Thus, on 29 July 1974 (while Franco was hospitalized), Santiago Carrillo, general secretary of the clandestine Communist Party of Spain (by far the most entrenched anti-Francoist party in Spain, far surpassing the Spanish Socialist Workers' Party), introduced the Democratic Junta in Paris—the initial fruit of the nationwide opposition convergence process. Alongside the PCE (which formalized its 1970 "pact for freedom" proposal), it encompassed the Socialist Party of the Interior led by Enrique Tierno Galván—soon to be redesignated Spanish Socialist Workers' Party—the Carlist Party—a faction of Carlism that had shifted toward the "self-managed socialism" propounded by Carlos Hugo, Duke of Parma—and two prominent "Juanists" monarchists, Antonio García Trevijano and Rafael Calvo Serer—apparently the idea's proponents following their unsuccessful endeavor to have Juan de Borbón issue a complete rupture with the Francoist regime (and indirectly with his son, Prince Juan Carlos, Franco's successor). It also incorporated certain far-left communist groups, such as the Workers' Party of Spain, and the increasingly PCE-influenced "Workers' Commissions". The Democratic Junta's program rested on a "democratic break" with Francoism through citizen mobilization (modeled on the process pursued in 1930-1931 to terminate the monarchy of Alfonso XIII). In Spain, the Democratic Junta was clandestinely presented in a Madrid hotel in January 1975. Its objective was to establish a provisional government to restore freedoms, grant a comprehensive amnesty for all political prisoners, decree separation of church and state, and conduct a referendum on the form of government, monarchy or republic. Concerning the scope of the amnesty, Santiago Carrillo declared in a Paris address that it should extend to both sides of the civil war, "and not only for those who fought in the war, but also for those who fought afterward and for those who killed us afterward."

However, the PCE failed to integrate opposition forces unwilling to accept communist hegemony—led by the Spanish Socialist Workers' Party and the Team of Christian Democracy—which also diverged from the Democratic Junta on a pivotal issue: they were prepared to endorse Juan Carlos's monarchy if it ushered in a fully democratic political system, unlike the Junta's rejection of "Franco's successor". These groups constituted their own unitary entity in June 1975, denominated the Platform of Democratic Convergence, comprising the PSOE—having revitalized its program and leadership at the Suresnes Congress in October 1974, where a young Sevillian labor lawyer, Felipe González, was elected new secretary general, supplanting the veteran Rodolfo Llopis—and the Team of Christian Democracy led by José María Gil-Robles y Quiñones (the former CEDA leader during the Second Spanish Republic) and Joaquín Ruiz Giménez, alongside the Basque Nationalist Party, the social democratic faction of ex-Falangist Dionisio Ridruejo, and several far-left communist groups such as the Communist Movement of Spain (MCE) and the Revolutionary Workers' Organization (ORT). The Platform proved more radical than the Democratic Junta in recognizing the "right to self-determination" of "nationalities and regions with ethnic, historical, or cultural identity." The Democratic Junta confined its program to "recognizing, under Spain's unity, the political personality of the Catalan, Basque, and Galician peoples and the regional communities that democratically request it."

One dilemma confronting the democratic opposition was the stance to adopt regarding ETA's terrorist assaults, which claimed thirty-four lives in 1974 and 1975—eighteen police and civil guards, and sixteen civilians (indeed, within the organization itself, a debate had emerged on the role of violence in the anti-Francoist struggle, culminating in the schism between "milis" and "poli-milis" following the brutal Café Rolando bombing in Madrid on 13 September 1973). The majority of Basque and Spanish democratic forces opposed "armed struggle" while denouncing the violence of Francoist repression. However, they acknowledged ETA's popular support among certain Basque social sectors, particularly after the "Burgos Trials" of December 1970. "With not a few ambiguities," their adopted position was to avoid condemning ETA's terrorism. Nevertheless, the PCE did censure the assassination of Carrero Blanco, with even more forceful condemnation subsequent to the Café Rolando bombing, though ETA did not claim responsibility until years later.

On the other hand, Javier Tusell has observed that in these final years of Francoism, "a kind of intermediate zone" materialized between the "moderate" opposition and the "reformist" sector of the regime, "comprising individuals who, from within the regime, sought to attain democracy, or opponents who, because they favored that reformist path, did not differ substantially from their supposed adversaries. This intermediate world played a very significant role in the Spanish transition to democracy." According to Tusell, the Tácito group, formed in mid-1973, constituted the most substantial of this "intermediate zone." Among the Tácito group were Fernando Álvarez de Miranda, Luis Apostua, and Íñigo Cavero.

=== Final agony of the dictatorship ===
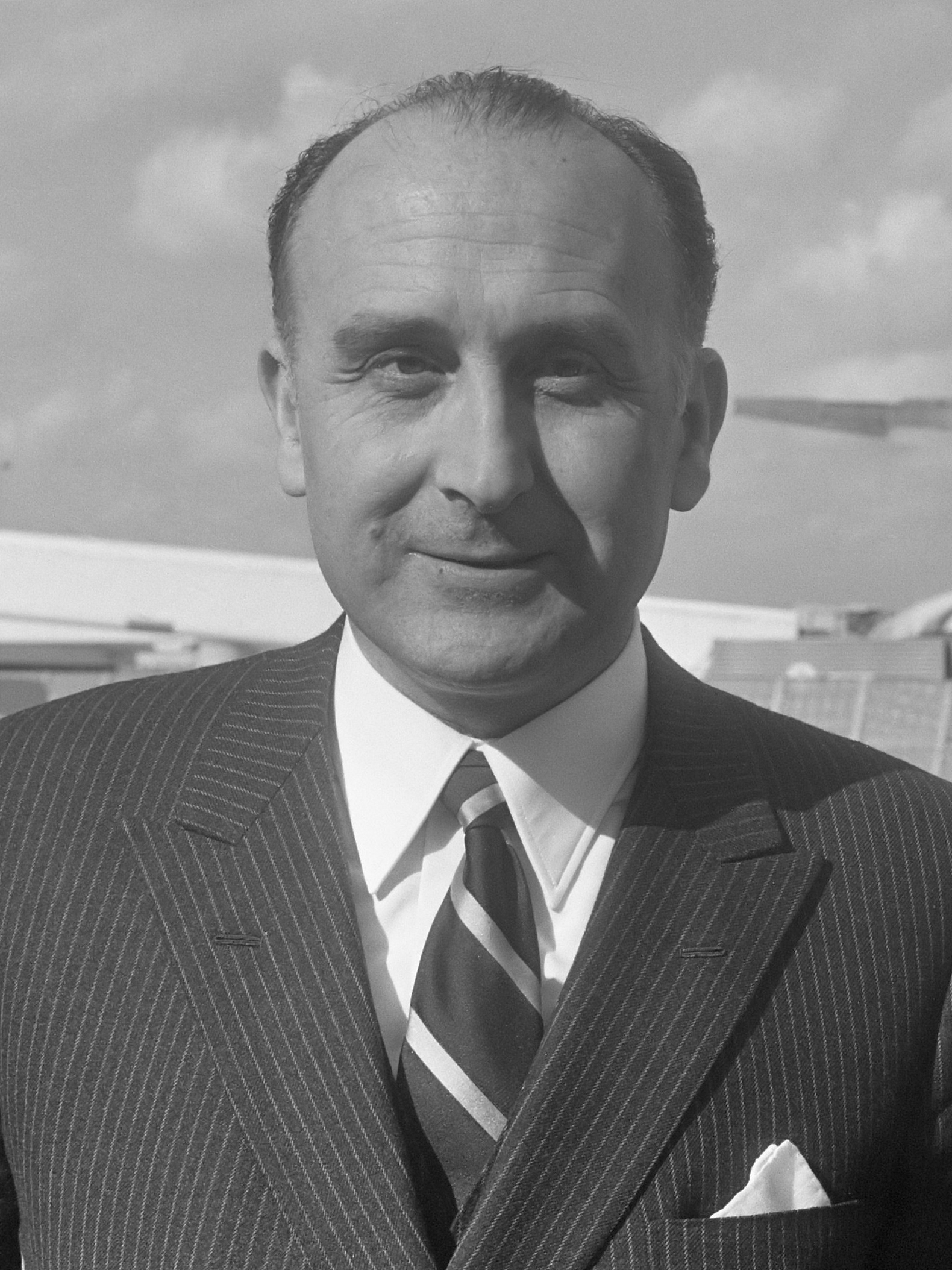
Licinio de la Fuente, Minister of Labor from 1969 to 1975

In early March 1975, Arias Navarro undertook a restructuring of his government, capitalizing on the resignation of Vice President and Labor Minister Licinio de la Fuente (who withdrew from office owing to the president's opposition to regulating labor conflicts, including a modest acknowledgment of the right to strike). Threatening to resign, Arias Navarro ultimately persuaded Franco to accept the departure of the two "ultra" ministers, José Utrera Molina and Francisco Ruiz Jarabo, with the former succeeded by the "aperturist" Fernando Herrero Tejedor, whose trusted associate, Adolfo Suárez, assumed the vice-secretary role. This adjustment accentuated the politically neutral, albeit moderately aperturist, character of the administration. However, in June, Herrero Tejedor perished in a vehicular accident, and Arias, at Franco's insistence, appointed José Solís Ruiz as his successor, who had forsaken "aperturism." A few weeks thereafter, Girón and Rodríguez de Valcárcel, in collaboration with the "El Pardo circle," made a final endeavor to convince Franco to dismiss Arias Navarro or at least prolong Rodríguez de Valcárcel's tenure as president of the Council of the Realm and the Francoist Cortes. "But Franco was already scarcely capable of reacting and unable to enact any measures." Arias Navarro contemplated resignation—he even drafted a resignation letter dated 25 July—but was dissuaded by ministers Solís and José García Hernández.

Solís was entrusted with developing the decree-law on associations within the "Movement community," and in August, he inaugurated the National Register of Associations—the "window"—to which the following adhered: Spanish People's Union, an association established by the government, with Solís as its principal advocate and Adolfo Suárez, a trusted confidant of the deceased Herrero Tejedor, as president (initially designated Alliance for the People, AP, it sought to perpetuate the National Movement, with its statutes presented to Franco himself); Spanish National Union, led by the Traditionalist Antonio María de Oriol y Urquijo; Institutional Front, chaired by Ramón Forcadell; Spanish National Front, directed by the Falangist camisa vieja Raimundo Fernández-Cuesta; Spanish Social Reform, headed by the Falangist Manuel Cantarero del Castillo; Democratic Spanish Union, presided over by the conservative Catholic Federico Silva Muñoz; the National Association for the Study of Current Issues (ANEPA), led by the likewise Catholic Leopoldo Stampa; and the Proverist Association, chaired by Manuel Maysounave.

Meanwhile, the "reformist" faction rejected the restrictive framework offered by associations within the "Movement community" and opted to establish study societies, precursors to future political parties. The most notable was FEDISA (Federación de Estudios Independientes), founded by Manuel Fraga Iribarne—who later established GODSA—and including Pío Cabanillas, José María de Areilza, Leopoldo Calvo-Sotelo, Francisco Fernández Ordóñez, and Marcelino Oreja Aguirre, the latter also a member of the Christian-democratic Tácito collective. The liberal Joaquín Garrigues Walker founded the Libra Study Society. "The political associations were born predestined to fail. By then, Fraga, serving as ambassador in London, and the Tácitos were issuing vague pronouncements regarding the desirability of a 'gradual democratic evolution' culminating in the election of a chamber by universal suffrage," though they also repudiated "the political break advocated by the democratic opposition." Journalist Luis María Ansón, in the pages of ABC on 20 May, cautioned of "a rumor of rats abandoning the regime's ship," as the situation had entered a phase of "save-yourself-who-can, unconditional surrender." The government, meanwhile, persisted in defending its program of "evolutionary continuity," whose "four basic foundations" were "popular will, Constitution, Monarchy, and Army," as elucidated by the Minister of the Presidency Antonio Carro before the Francoist Cortes on 28 July. A few days prior, Franco had addressed a delegation from the National Brotherhood of Provisional Ensigns—in reference to his denunciation of the anti-Francoist opposition (the previous day, the Revolutionary Antifascist Patriotic Front [FRAP] had killed a policeman): "I believe you ascribe too much significance to barking dogs. In reality, they constitute minuscule minorities that precisely demonstrate our vitality and test the strength and resilience of our homeland." He then exhorted them to defend the Civil War victory to the death. Around the same period, the government prohibited the entry of Juan de Borbón, father of Prince Juan Carlos, into Spain for a discourse in which he declared: "I consider it an inescapable duty to persevere in our attitude until those who truly possess the authority to steer the state aright are convinced they must do so, so that the Spanish people, as is just, finally attain access to national sovereignty."

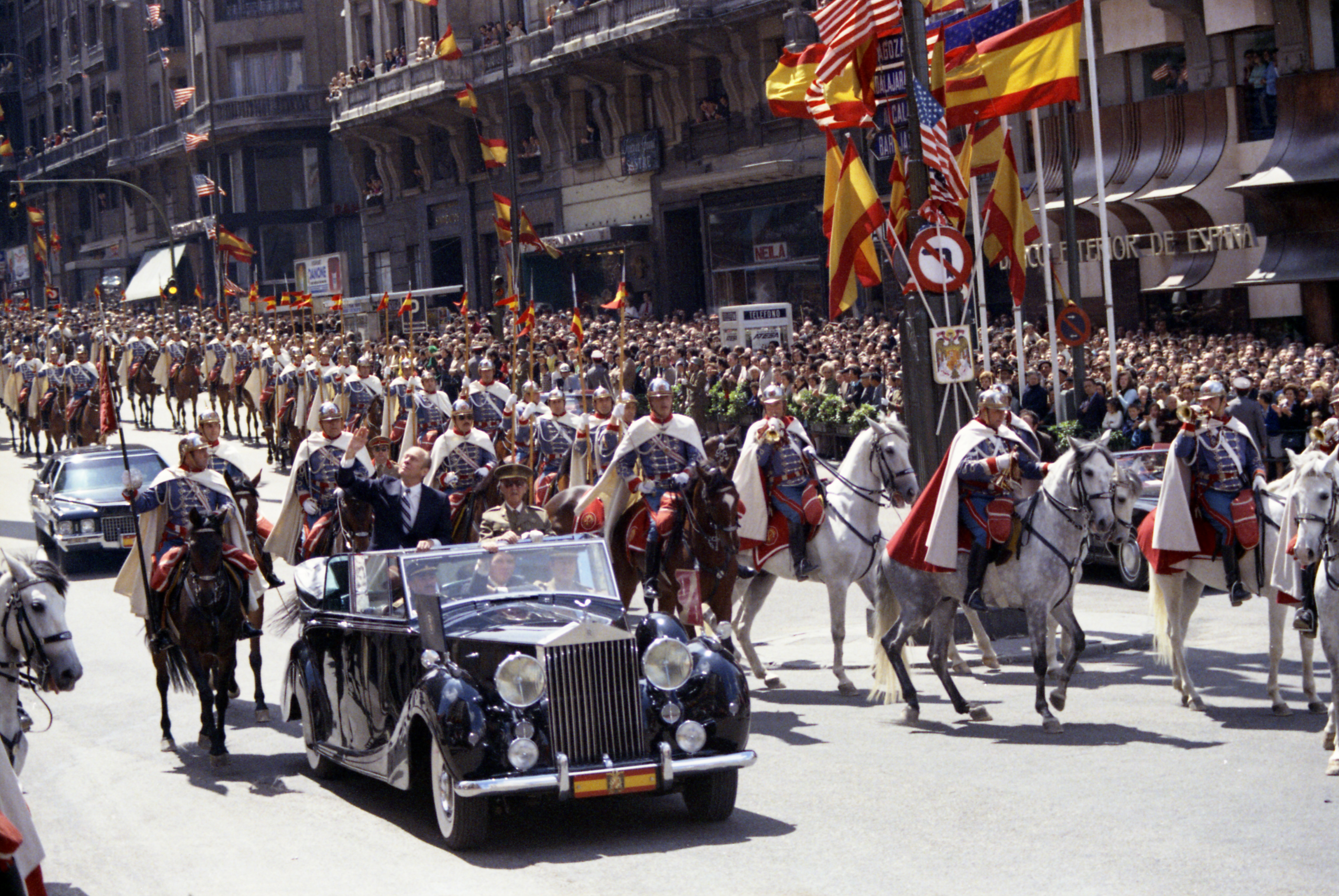
Procession through the streets of Madrid by U.S. President Gerald Ford, accompanied by General Franco, during his brief visit to Spain (31 May 1975).

In April, the conflict with the Catholic Church intensified when the Episcopal Conference approved (by seventy votes to eleven) the document La Reconciliación en la Iglesia y en la Sociedad. Carta pastoral Colectiva del Episcopado Español [The Reconciliation in the Church and in Society. Collective Pastoral Letter of the Spanish Episcopate], which unequivocally stated that "in our homeland, the progressive endeavor to create appropriate political structures and institutions must be sustained by the will to overcome the deleterious effects of the Spanish Civil War that then divided citizens into victors and vanquished, and which still constitute a grave impediment to full reconciliation among brethren." This marked a complete reversal of the Collective Letter of the Spanish Bishops on the Occasion of the War in Spain of 1937, wherein the Catholic Church justified the military uprising and legitimized the rebel side's struggle by designating the war a "Crusade." The document also advocated the necessity of establishing freedom of political parties, trade union freedom, and recognition of the right to strike. The following month, the National Justice and Peace Commission commenced drafting a document, published shortly thereafter, rejecting the Francoist regime as authoritarian and undemocratic and advocating a "break" with it (calling for universal suffrage, amnesty, guarantees of rights, the dissolution of the Francoist Cortes for being unrepresentative, and freedom of parties and unions). It also demanded a new Joint Assembly akin to that of 1971, open to all faithful to participate in the Church's life and governance.

Flag of the Revolutionary Antifascist Patriotic Front (FRAP), a far-left group that resorted to "armed struggle" to terminate the dictatorship. Three of its militants were executed by firing squad on 27 September 1975 after being condemned by a court-martial.

During those months, labor conflict continued to escalate as a consequence of the economic crisis, which deteriorated further with rising inflation (17% in 1975) and unemployment (700,000 unemployed, 5% of the active population), coinciding with two financial scandals (Reace case and SOFICO). This precipitated the most significant wave of strikes and worker mobilizations in Francoist history, including new sectors such as resident medical interns (MIR), who initiated a strike in May. The subsequent month, "unitary democratic candidacies" promoted by the "Workers' Commissions" and other clandestine organizations prevailed in union elections in large enterprises and industrial regions with a robust combative tradition, as well as elsewhere. The civil governor of Barcelona, Rodolfo Martín Villa, acknowledged that for the government, they constituted "a success in participation and a political failure to the extent that the general impression was that they had been won by a trade union opposition whose core was the Communist Party of Spain." In certain localities, such as Cornellà de Llobregat, the newly elected union representatives occupied Vertical Syndicate offices, expelling Falangist leaders. Leaders of the Catalan "Workers' Commissions" spoke of undertaking "the political assault on the Vertical Syndicate with the intention of dismantling it as an instrument of employer and fascist regime interests."

Additionally, terrorist activity intensified, both from ETA—with eighteen fatalities in 1974 and sixteen in 1975—and from the Revolutionary Antifascist Patriotic Front (FRAP)—with three lethal attacks in 1975. This, in turn, heightened repression, including the reimposition of a state of emergency in Vizcaya and Guipúzcoa on 25 April 1975. On 22 August 1975, a decree-law "on the prevention and prosecution of terrorism and subversion against social peace and personal security" was promulgated, reinstating military jurisdiction as in the early Francoism period and suspending Articles 15 and 18 of the Fuero de los Españoles, which addressed the inviolability of the home and the 72-hour limit on detentions. The government deemed "the clemency shown in the Burgos Council to have been an error" and believed it essential "to induce the violent to cease their activities through fear of exceedingly severe reprisals." The anti-Francoist opposition's rejection of the decree was joined by Cardinal Tarancón, who regarded it as a misstep. This repressive escalation particularly targeted the Basque Country. Between 1973 and 1975, approximately 6,500 Basque citizens were detained, many reporting mistreatment and torture at police stations or Guardia Civil barracks.

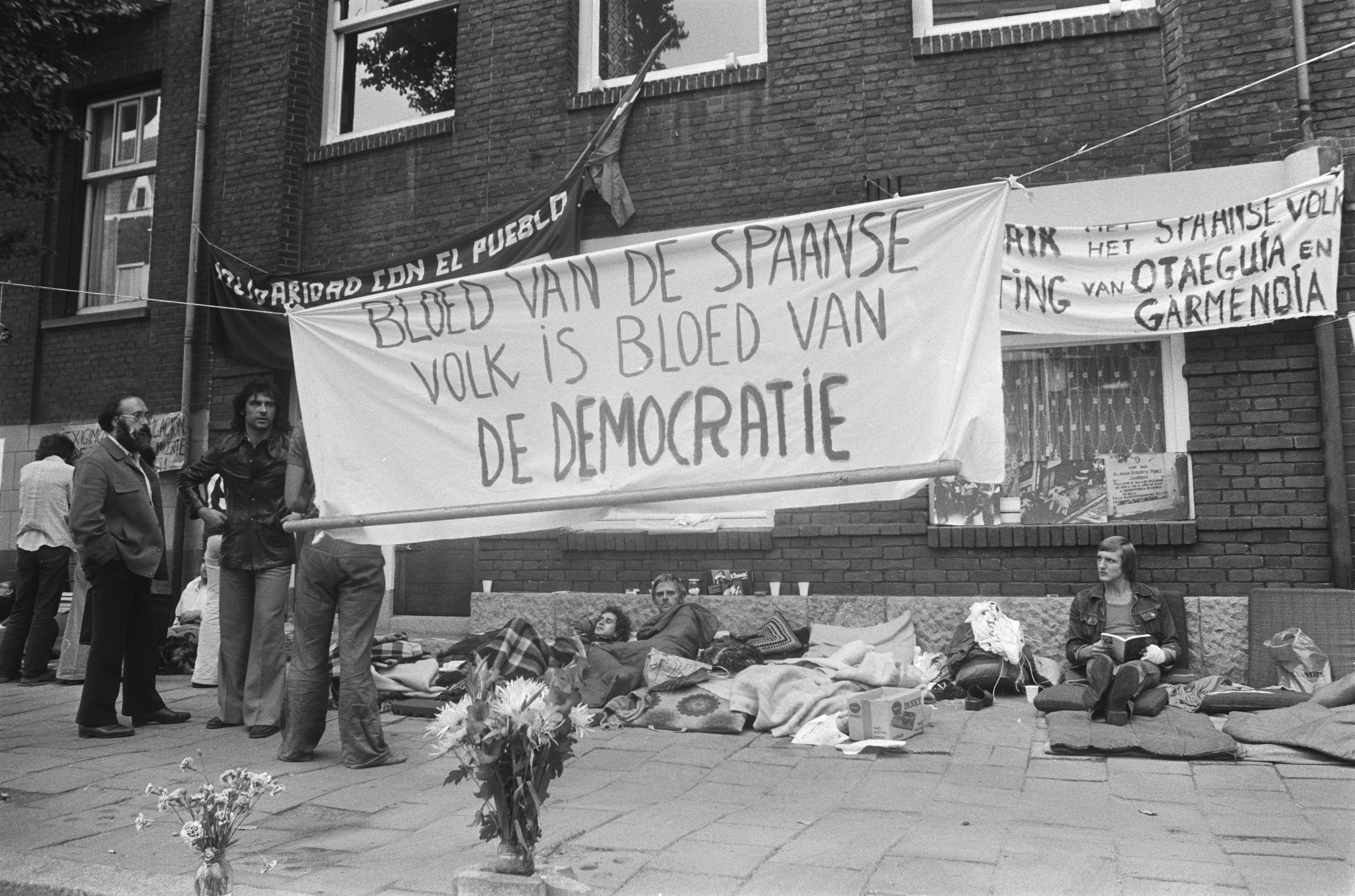
Camp outside the Spanish consulate in Amsterdam in protest of the court-martial against José Antonio Garmendia Artola and Ángel Otaegui. The principal banner reads in Dutch: "The blood of the Spanish people is the blood of democracy." 2 September 1975.

Under the anti-terrorism legislation, between 29 August and 17 September 1975, three ETA militants and eight FRAP members (including two pregnant women) were subjected to various courts-martial and sentenced to death. This provoked substantial public outcry both within and beyond Spain, as well as clemency appeals from prominent European political figures—including Pope Paul VI and Queen Elizabeth II of the United Kingdom. Notwithstanding this, Franco declined to commute the death sentences of two ETA militants (Ángel Otaegui and Juan Paredes Manot) and three FRAP members (José Luis Sánchez Bravo, Ramón García Sanz, and Humberto Baena), and the five were executed by firing squad on 27 September 1975. This act, characterized as "brutal" by most European press, further intensified international condemnation of Francoism, leading to numerous anti-Francoist demonstrations in major European cities (the Spanish embassy in Lisbon was stormed by a crowd, with Portuguese police offering no resistance). Moreover, the ambassadors of fifteen Western European nations withdrew from Madrid, plunging the Francoist regime back into an isolation and reprobation reminiscent of the immediate post-World War II period. Pope Paul VI expressed "his vibrant condemnation of such harsh repression that disregarded the appeals raised from all quarters against those executions." "Unfortunately, we have not been heeded," he concluded. The President of Mexico, Luis Echeverría, called for Spain's expulsion from the United Nations. The European Economic Community suspended negotiations with Spain. The Permanent Commission of the Episcopal Conference, presided over by Cardinal Tarancón, issued a statement condemning terrorism but asserting that "repressive measures alone are insufficient" and that "a loyal political opposition or criticism of the government... cannot legitimately be considered a criminal act." In the Basque Country, a general strike was declared, followed by over 200,000 workers. "If, as the Caudillo had declared, the pardon following the Burgos Trials had been a sign of the regime's strength, the executions of 27 September 1975 were the sign of its final decline," asserted Paul Preston.

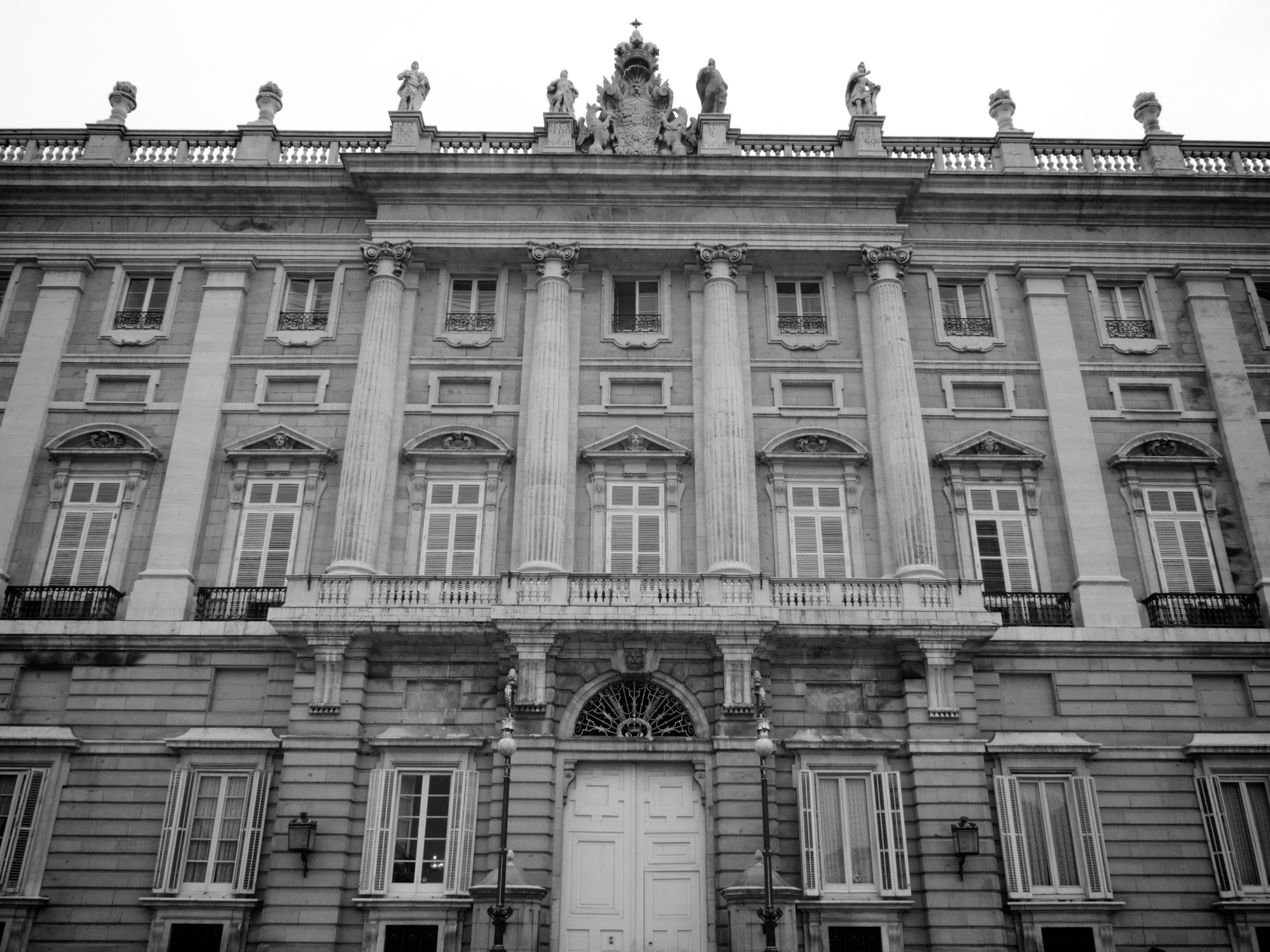
Balcony of the east facade of the Royal Palace of Madrid from which General Franco delivered his final speech on 1 October 1975 to the crowd gathered there as a tribute to himself and a rebuttal to the international condemnation of the executions of 27 September.

In response, on 1 October 1975 (the thirty-ninth anniversary of General Franco's ascent to power), the Movement organized a rally in support of Franco in Madrid's Plaza de Oriente. In his address, a frail Franco, nearly voiceless, once again spoke of a "Masonic and leftist conspiracy" against Spain. The speech "could not have been more pathetic and significant. He was, like his regime, utterly anchored in the past," observed Borja de Riquer. "Franco's words on this occasion, though well received, assumed a profoundly pathetic tone and, above all, demonstrated that he was anchored in a past that seemed exceedingly remote to most Spaniards," emphasized Javier Tusell. It marked the last occasion General Franco appeared in public:

The attacks on several of our representations once again demonstrate what we can expect from certain corrupt countries. [...] All the protests that have taken place stem from a Masonic and leftist conspiracy in the political class, in collusion with communist-terrorist subversion in society, which, if it honors us, debases them. [...] Evidently, being Spanish has once again become something in the world today.

That same day, a communist group of obscure origin assassinated four policemen in Madrid, subsequently identifying itself as the First of October Anti-Fascist Resistance Groups (GRAPO). The "Democratic Junta" and the "Platform" issued their inaugural joint statement, pledging to "make a united effort to enable the urgent formation of a broad, democratically organized coalition, without exclusions, capable of guaranteeing the unrestricted exercise of political freedoms."

==== Death of Franco ====
Political Testament of Franco
Spaniards: As the hour approaches for me to render my life before the Almighty and face His unappealable judgment, I beseech God to receive me benignly into His presence, for I have sought to live and die as a Catholic. In the name of Christ I take pride, and it has been my constant will to be a faithful son of the Church, within whose bosom I shall die.
I ask forgiveness of all, as I wholeheartedly forgive those who declared themselves my enemies without me considering them as such. I believe and hope I have had no others but those who were enemies of Spain, which I love until my last moment and which I promised to serve until my final breath, now near.
I wish to thank all those who have collaborated with enthusiasm, dedication, and selflessness in the great endeavor of making Spain united, great, and free.
For the love I feel for our homeland, I ask you to persevere in unity and peace, and to surround the future King of Spain, Don Juan Carlos de Borbón, with the same affection and loyalty you have shown me, and to offer him at all times the same support and collaboration I have received from you.
Do not forget that the enemies of Spain and Christian civilization are alert. You must also be vigilant, and for this, set aside, in the face of the supreme interests of the homeland and the Spanish people, all personal life.
Do not cease to achieve social justice and culture for all men of Spain, and make this your primary objective. Maintain the unity of Spain's lands, exalting the rich multiplicity of its regions as a source of the nation's strength.
I would like, in my last moment, to unite the names of God and Spain and embrace you all to shout together, for the last time, on the threshold of my death: Up with Spain! Long live Spain!

Fourteen days subsequent to the large rally in Plaza de Oriente, Franco fell gravely ill. On 30 October, cognizant of his critical condition—having already endured four heart attacks— he transferred his powers to Prince Juan Carlos under the Organic Law of the State, fearing for his life (a priest had administered the last rites on 25 October). On 3 November, he underwent a life-or-death operation for peritonitis in an improvised operating theater at the El Pardo Palace, and was subsequently transported to Madrid's La Paz Hospital, where he underwent another procedure two days later to excise two-thirds of his stomach to halt the bleeding.

While this transpired, Prince Juan Carlos, acting as interim head of state, was compelled to address the severe crisis unfolding in the Spanish Sahara due to the Green March of Moroccan civilians organized by King Hassan II of Morocco to compel Spain to relinquish control of the territory he claimed as part of his sovereignty (the Permanent Court of Arbitration had ruled in early October against Morocco's claims and in favor of the right to self-determination of the Sahrawi people). While the Spanish government negotiated with Morocco (Franco, prior to his life-or-death operation at El Pardo, had instructed Arias Navarro to dispatch Solís to Rabat), Prince Juan Carlos visited the Sahara, assuring the defending troops that the withdrawal would be conducted "in good order and with dignity." On 14 November, the Madrid Accords were signed, under which Spain withdrew from the colony and transferred its administration to Morocco (the northern half) and Mauritania (the southern half). Both nations committed to respecting the Sahrawi population's will within the framework of the United Nations. "It was undoubtedly an emergency agreement that manifested the utmost weakness of an eroded regime." "The withdrawal constituted a true symbol of the end of Franco's dictatorship, which concluded with the ignominious handover of the last Spanish colonial territory while the very military figure who had most aspired to construct a great Spanish empire in Africa departed," concluded Borja de Riquer.

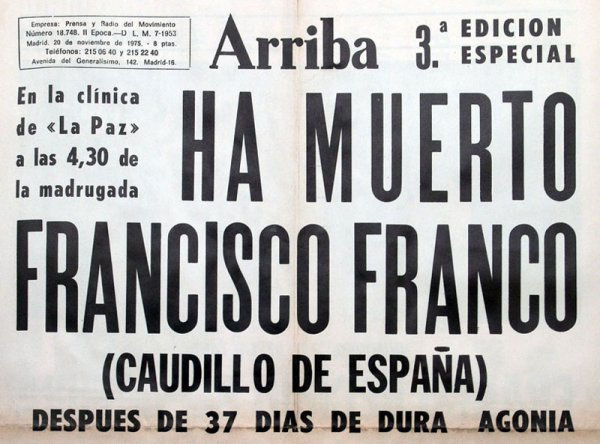
Front page of the official Movement newspaper Arriba on 20 November 1975, reporting Franco's death.

Since his admission to La Paz Hospital on 4 November, Franco was sustained using all available medical procedures while enduring agony (when regaining consciousness, he would murmur "how arduous it is to die"). He underwent another operation on 15 November. He expired in the early hours of 20 November, "surrounded by his closest family and accompanied by the incorrupt arm of Saint Teresa of Ávila and the mantle of the Virgin of the Pillar." He died at 3:20 am, though the official announcement listed 5:20 am. The two-hour discrepancy represented the time required to initiate "Operation Lucero," the mobilization of security forces and the military to prevent incidents upon the announcement of the Generalissimo's death. Certain opposition leaders were placed under surveillance, while others were detained for a few hours.

Early that morning, Prime Minister Carlos Arias Navarro announced Franco's death on television (his precise words were: "Spaniards. Franco has died. The exceptional man who, before God and history, assumed the immense responsibility of the most demanding and sacrificial service to Spain, has given his life, consumed day by day, hour by hour, in the fulfillment of a transcendent mission") and then recited his final message, known as Franco's political testament. Its concluding paragraph states: "I would like, in my last moment, to unite the names of God and Spain and embrace you all to shout together, for the last time, on the threshold of my death: Up with Spain! Long live Spain!" "Arias breaks down, scarcely able to complete the sentence, sobbing, crying," observes Alfonso Pinilla García.

Shortly thereafter, Arias Navarro clashed with Cardinal Tarancón, president of the Spanish Episcopal Conference, because the latter declined to permit the 84 Spanish bishops to officiate Franco's funeral on the grounds of the Royal Palace of Madrid. "If it were the pope, perhaps, perhaps one could consider it. But, concerning a head of state, it did not seem appropriate," Tarancón stated years later. Arias Navarro was so incensed that he refused to engage with Tarancón when the latter visited El Pardo Palace to officiate the initial mass for the deceased head of state.

The funeral chapel was established on 21 November in the Hall of Columns, Royal Palace of Madrid, with the casket uncovered. Lengthy queues formed to view it. No heads of state or government attended the subsequent funeral, save for the Chilean dictator Augusto Pinochet, a great admirer of Franco, and King Hussein of Jordan. Conducted on 23 November and officiated by 15 bishops, the homily was not delivered by Cardinal Tarancón, president of the Spanish Episcopal Conference, but by the Primate of Toledo, Monsignor Marcelo González Martín, who delivered an impassioned eulogy of Franco's historical legacy. After honors were rendered by units of the Brunete Armoured Division, commanded by General Jaime Milans del Bosch, the casket was conveyed to the Valley of the Fallen, where it was interred at 2:11 PM, "amid a mixture of sensations: profound sorrow for some, great relief for others, and deep concern for nearly all."

On 22 November, Prince Juan Carlos was proclaimed king before the Francoist Cortes, after swearing to uphold the Principles of the National Movement. On 27 November, a ceremony exalting the new monarch transpired, attended by numerous foreign dignitaries (including Valéry Giscard d'Estaing, President of the French Republic; Walter Scheel, President of the Federal Republic of Germany; Nelson Rockefeller, Vice President of the United States; and the Prince Philip, Duke of Edinburgh, consort of Queen Elizabeth II), in contrast to Franco's funeral. "A new historical phase commenced, replete with uncertainties, doubts, and hopes," cautioned Borja de Riquer. "The monarchy of Don Juan Carlos remained an unknown in 1975," stated Javier Tusell. A few months following Franco's death, Jorge de Esteban and Luis López Guerra inquired: "To what extent will the psychological influence of the civil war on victors and vanquished (categories that remain valid because, until now, there has been no reconciliation) condition the political life of the future?" They also pondered "whether the Army will assume a prominent role in Spanish political life; and, if the answer is affirmative, what manner of stance it will adopt."

Assessment of Franco and His Regime by Historian Javier Tusell
A person of duty-bound character, prudent and adept, Franco was also a dictator insensitive to the sufferings of the vanquished, incapable of concluding a civil war and deified by the sincere conviction that he was a providential man for his country. Some of his adherents have attributed to Francoism the modernization of Spanish society or even the establishment of a monarchy like that of 1975, but in reality, it delayed economic development, and the type of monarchy implanted after 1975 diverged significantly from what Franco had envisioned for Spaniards. What is evident, however, is that if the regime bearing his name had been totalitarian, the former would not have been feasible, and the transition to democracy without severe social traumas would have been considerably more arduous. Ultimately, if Francoism lacked legitimacy in its final phase, there existed a legality that was upheld, despite being a dictatorship, thanks to a relatively independent bureaucracy. Thus, the highest praise that can be accorded the regime lies in what it *was not*, that is, totalitarian.

Indeed, what would be termed sociological Francoism retained strong roots within a significant portion of Spanish society, and the anti-Francoist opposition lacked the strength to overthrow the dictatorship. However, according to Borja de Riquer, "it had succeeded in weakening it to the point of rendering its continuity impossible after Franco's death," such that "when the dictator expired, a large segment of Spanish society favored a regime of political freedoms"—a survey conducted after his death indicated that 70% of Spaniards desired the introduction of a free and secret universal suffrage system. "As a result of social, religious, and cultural transformations, as well as the opposition's own endeavors, there had been a growing infusion of democratic principles into society, permeating it and rendering its demands and aspirations for the future markedly different from what the regime's laws prescribed," noted Javier Tusell.

Carme Molinero and Pere Ysàs have observed that

the end of Franco's life occurred when the dictatorship was immersed in a profound crisis. Strict continuity offered no solution to stabilize the political situation or to avert, perhaps irreversibly, damage to the monarchical institution. Aperturist and reformist attempts had repeatedly faltered due to a combination of the limitations of their proposals, their inability to garner broad support, and the hostility of those who rejected any change, however limited, perceiving it as a threat to the regime's destruction. Nevertheless, it would be the option pursued, albeit more ambitiously and decisively after the Caudillo's death. On the other hand, the rupturism sustained by significant mobilization lacked the strength to precipitate the dictatorship's collapse but was sufficient to render continuity and reformism unviable. This constituted the complex political situation in Spain at the close of autumn 1975.

Writer and columnist Manuel Vázquez Montalbán described the situation "when Franco disappears" as "a correlation of weaknesses."

== Bibliography ==
- De Esteban, Jorge; López Guerra, Luis (1977). La crisis del Estado franquista [The Crisis of the Francoist State] (in Spanish). Barcelona: Labor. ISBN 84-335-3252-9.
- De Riquer, Borja (2010). La dictadura de Franco (in Spanish). Vol. 9 of the Historia de España, directed by Josep Fontana and Ramón Villares. Barcelona-Madrid: Crítica-Marcial Pons. ISBN 978-84-9892-063-5.
- De Riquer, Borja (2015). "La crisis de la dictadura". In Julián Casanova (ed.). Cuarenta años con Franco (in Spanish). Barcelona: Crítica. pp. 115–149. ISBN 978-84-9892-791-7.
- Gil Pecharromán, Julio (2008). Con permiso de la autoridad. La España de Franco (1939-1975) [With the Authority's Permission. Franco's Spain (1939-1975)] (in Spanish). Madrid: Temas de Hoy. ISBN 978-84-8460-693-2.
- Mateos, Abdón; Soto, Álvaro (1997). El final del franquismo, 1959-1975. La transformación de la sociedad española [The End of Francoism, 1959-1975. The Transformation of Spanish Society] (in Spanish). Madrid: Historia 16-Temas de Hoy. ISBN 84-7679-326-X.
- Molinero, Carme; Ysàs, Pere (2018). La Transición. Historia y relatos [The Transition. History and Narratives] (in Spanish). Madrid: Siglo XXI. ISBN 978-84-323-1909-9.
- Moradiellos, Enrique (2000). La España de Franco (1939-1975). Política y sociedad [Franco's Spain (1939-1975). Politics and Society] (in Spanish). Madrid: Síntesis. ISBN 84-7738-740-0.
- Payne, Stanley G. (2007). "Gobierno y oposición (1939-1969)". In Raymond Carr (ed.). 1939/1975 La Época de Franco (in Spanish). Madrid: Espasa-Calpe. pp. 97–235. ISBN 978-84-670-2627-6.
- Pinilla García, Alfonso (2021). La transición en España, España en transición. Historia reciente de nuestra democracia [The Transition in Spain, Spain in Transition. Recent History of Our Democracy] (in Spanish). Madrid: Alianza Editorial. ISBN 978-84-1362-540-9.
- Pinilla García, Alfonso (2023). Arias Navarro y la reforma imposible (1973-1976) (in Spanish). Prologue by Enrique Moradiellos. Madrid: Los Libros de la Catarata. ISBN 978-84-1352-509-9.
- Preston, Paul (1998) [1993]. Franco «Caudillo de España» [Franco. A Biography] (in Spanish). First edition in Mitos Bolsillo. Barcelona: Grijalbo Mondadori. ISBN 84-397-0241-8.
- Rodríguez Jiménez, José Luis (1997). La extrema derecha española en el Siglo XX [The Spanish Far Right in the 20th Century] (in Spanish). Madrid: Alianza Editorial. ISBN 84-206-2887-5.
- Suárez Fernández, Luis (2007). Franco. Crónica de un tiempo. VI. Los caminos de la instauración. Desde 1967 a 1975 [Franco. Chronicle of a Time. VI. The Paths of Establishment. From 1967 to 1975] (in Spanish). Madrid: Actas. ISBN 978-84-9739-063-7.
- Thomàs, Joan Maria (2019). Los fascismos españoles (in Spanish). New updated edition. Barcelona: Ariel. ISBN 978-84-344-3068-6.
- Tusell, Javier (1997). Historia de España. Vol. XIII. La época de Franco. Desde el fin de la Guerra Civil a la muerte de Franco (1939-1975) [History of Spain. Vol. XIII. The Franco Era. From the End of the Civil War to Franco's Death (1939-1975)] (in Spanish). Madrid: Espasa Calpe. ISBN 84-239-8946-1.
- Tusell, Javier (2007). "El tardofranquismo". In Raymond Carr (ed.). 1939/1975 La Época de Franco (in Spanish). Madrid: Espasa Calpe. pp. 239–286. ISBN 978-84-670-2627-6.
