= Eagle of Saint John =

Heraldic eagle

The Eagle of Saint John (Spanish: Águila de San Juan) is a heraldic eagle associated mostly with the Catholic Monarchs of Spain which was later used during the Francoist era (1938–1977) and the Spanish transition to democracy (1977–1981). It is sable with an or halo and feet of gules.

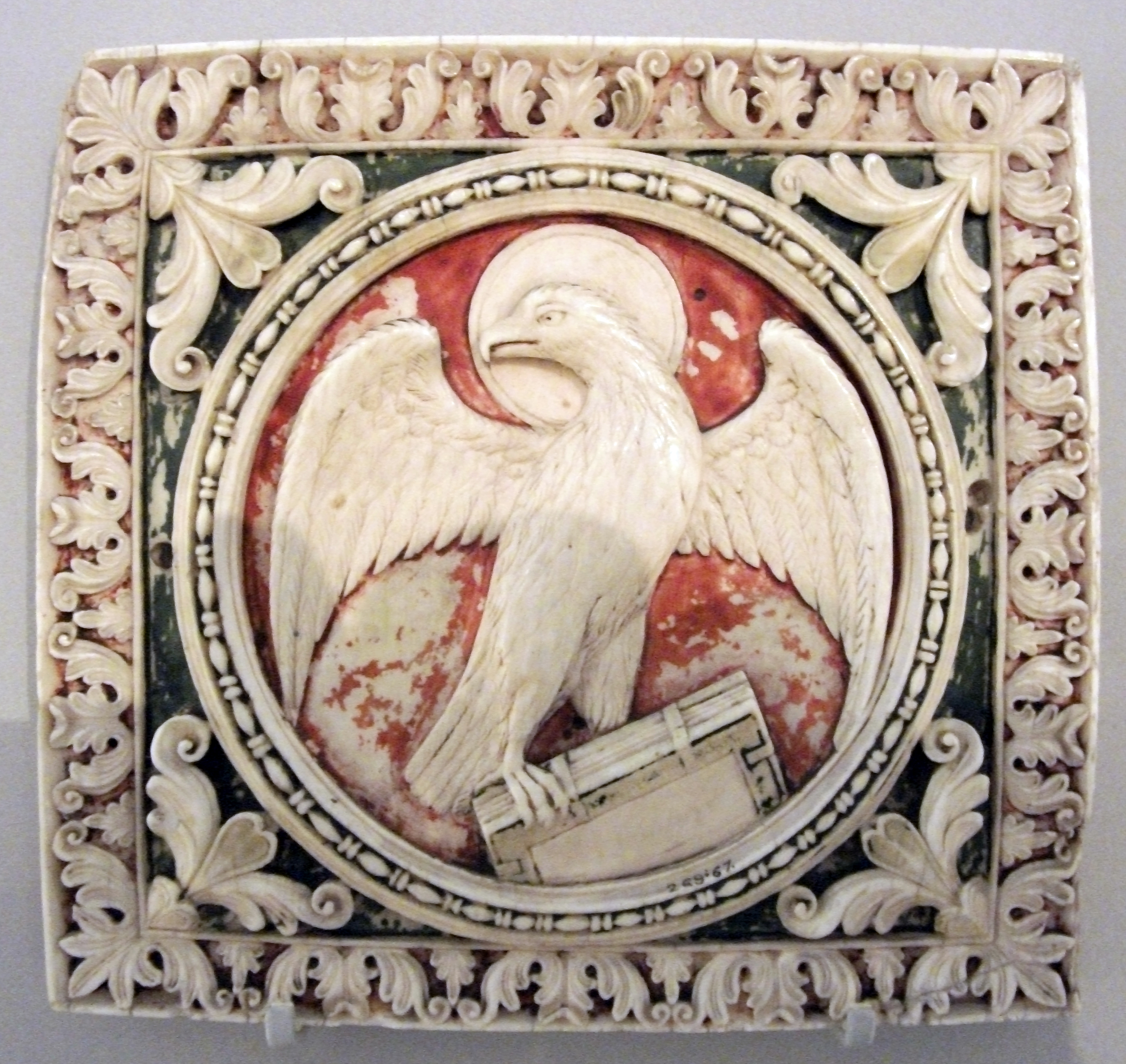
Carolingian ivory plaque with the eagle of Saint John, showing the customary halo, Victoria & Albert Museum

== Symbol of John the Evangelist ==
John the Evangelist, the author of the fourth gospel account, is symbolized by an eagle, an animal that may have originally been seen as the king of the birds, often with a halo. The eagle is a figure of the sky, thought by some Christian scholars to be able to look straight into the sun. It appears with three other beings as the tetramorph, interpreted in Christianity as symbols of the evangelists. The four beings appear as the living creatures in the Bible.

== Use by Isabella I of Castile ==
A well-known heraldic use of the Eagle of St. John is as the single supporter originally chosen by Queen Isabella of Castile in her coat of arms as heiress to the throne, later integrated into the heraldry of the Catholic Monarchs. This symbol was chosen due to the queen's devotion to the evangelist, predating her accession to the throne. There is a magnificent tapestry with the coat of arms of the Catholic Monarchs in the throne room of the Alcázar of Segovia.

== Use by Catherine of Aragon, Mary I of England, and Philip II of Spain ==
The Eagle of St. John was a supporter in the coat of arms used by Catherine of Aragon, queen consort to king Henry VIII of England, and daughter of queen Mary I of England and king Philip II of Spain, Catholics. The ornamented version of the coat of arms of Philip II bore the Eagle in duplicate.

== Use by Francisco Franco ==
The Eagle of the Evangelist was restored as a single supporter in the 1938, 1945 and 1977 versions of the coat of arms of Spain; it was removed in 1981.

== Use as a heraldic emblem ==
Prominent examples of the use of St. John's Eagle in heraldry across the world include the heraldry or emblems of: Valparaíso City, Chile; Boyacá Department, Colombia; Catholic Archdiocese of Besançon, France; Mallersdorf-Pfaffenberg, Germany; Lima, Peru; Kisielice, Kwidzyn District and Kwidzyn County, Oleśnica town and county, Poland; Gata and the 29th Infantry Regiment "Isabel la Católica", Spain; Lääne county, the towns of Haapsalu and Kuressaare, Estonia; and St. John's College of the University of Sydney, Australia).

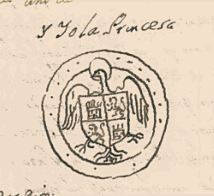
Coat of arms of Isabella of Castile as Princess of Asturias.

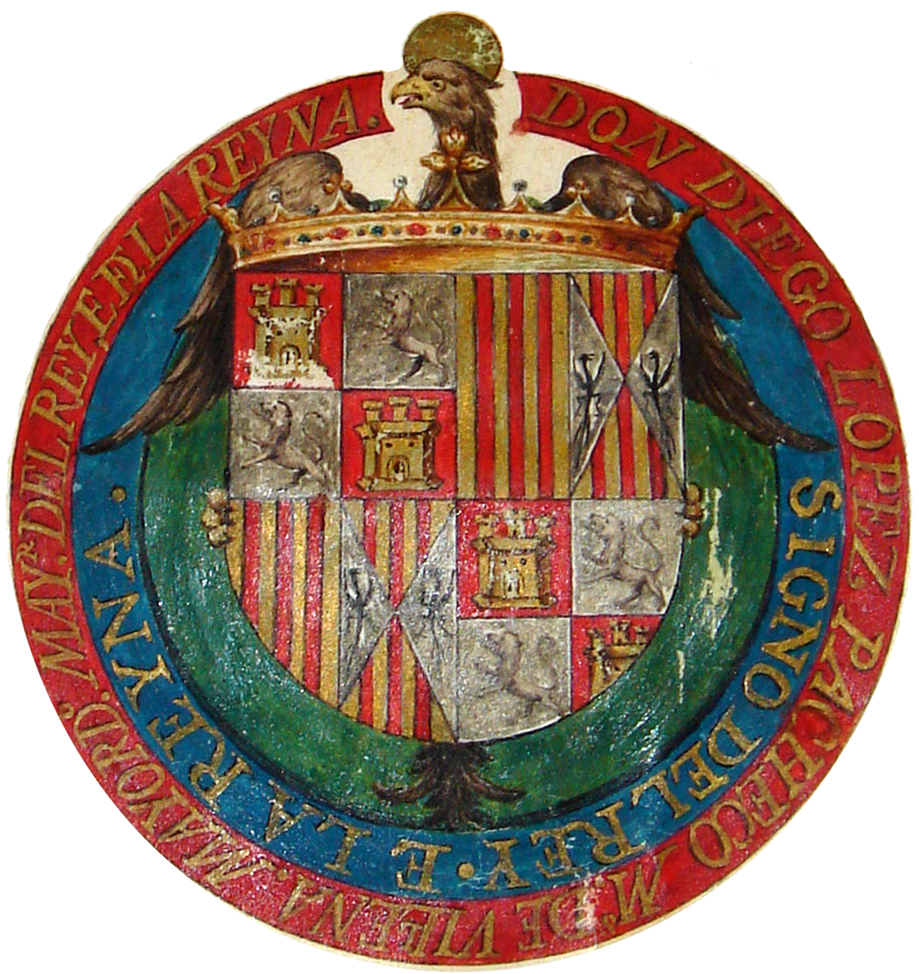
Coat of arms of the Catholic Monarchs.

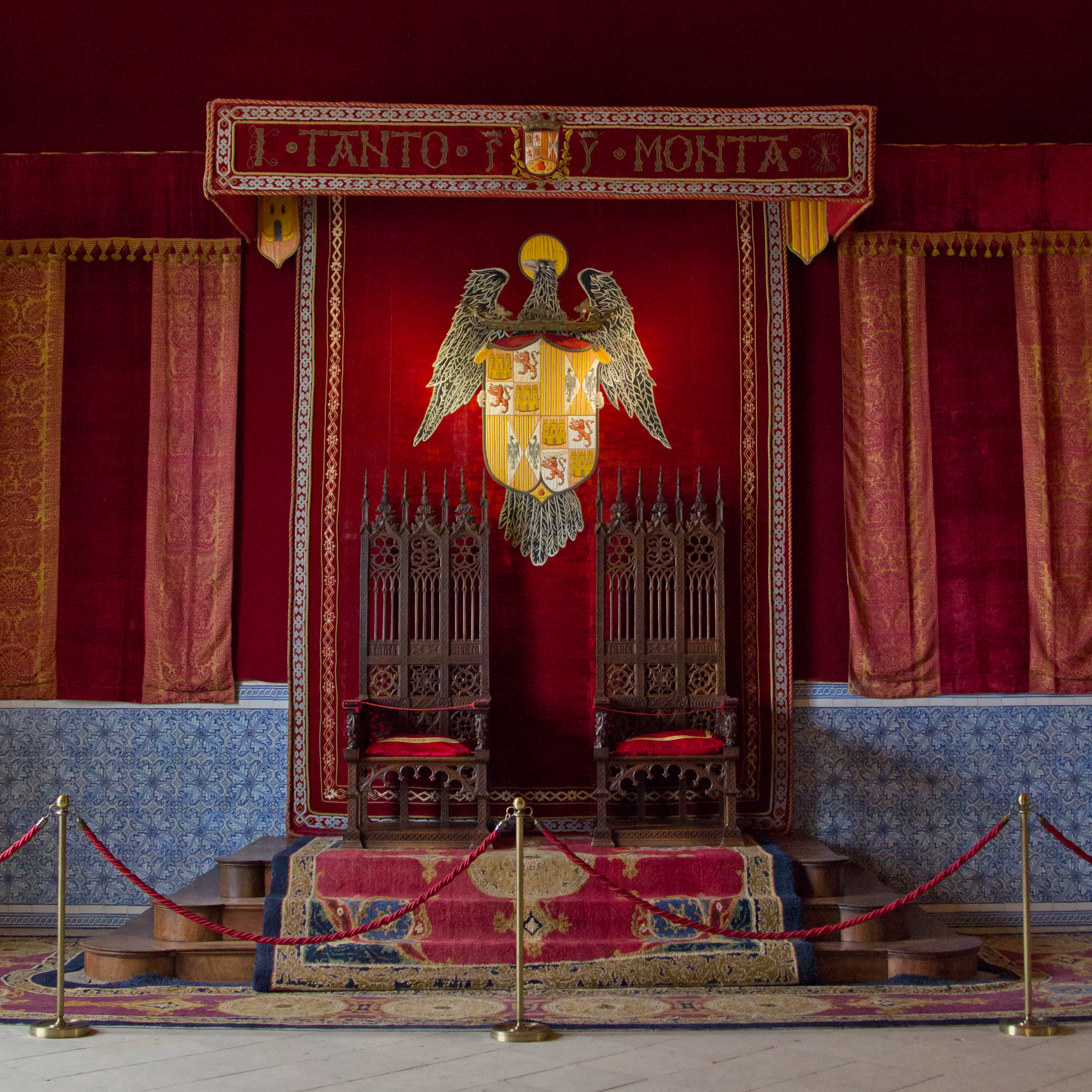
A coat of arms with the Eagle of Saint John in the Alcázar of Segovia.

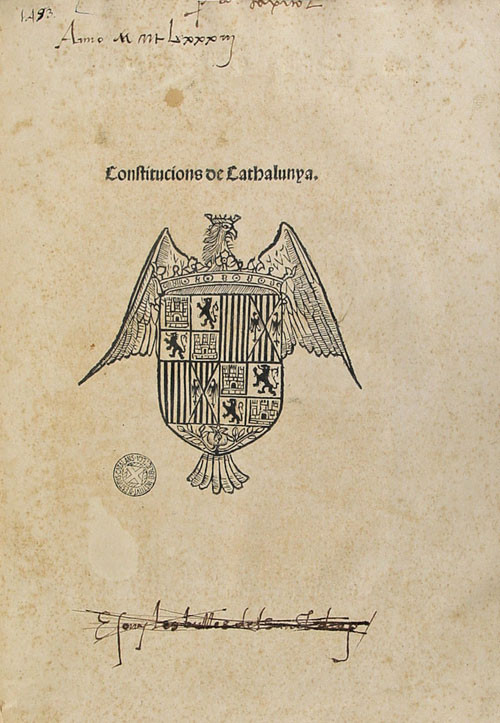
The 1494 Constitutions of Catalonia, with the Eagle.

Coat of arms of Ferdinand II of Aragon as Lord of Biscay.

The Eagle of Saint John and two lions, in an ornamented version of the coat of arms of Joanna I of Castile.

The Eagle of Saint John in the coat of arms of Catherine of Aragon, queen of England.

The Eagle of Saint John in the coat of arms of Mary I of England after her marriage with Philip II.

Coat of arms of Spain from 1938 (on the francoist side) to 1945.

Flag of Spain from 1938 (on the francoist side) to 1945.

Coat of arms of Spain from 1945 to 1977.

Flag of Spain from 1945 to 1977.

Coat of arms of Spain from 1977 to 1981.

Flag of Spain from 1977 to 1981 (currently banned).

Coat of arms of Lima.

Coat of arms of Valparaíso.

Coat of arms of the Boyacá Department.

Coat of arms of the Regimiento de Infantería "Isabel la Católica" n.º 29 (Spanish Army).

Coat of arms of the Bishopric of Ösel-Wiek.

Coat of arms of Lääne county, Estonia.

Coat of arms of Haapsalu, Estonia.

== See also ==
- Eagle (heraldry)
- Symbols of Francoism
- Yoke and arrows
- Lion of Saint Mark
