= Symbols of Francoism =

Iconic references of the Spanish regime between 1936 and 1975

Armorial achievement of Spain during the Francoist State, consisting of the traditional escutcheon (arms of Castile, León, Aragon, Navarre and Granada) and the Pillars of Hercules with the motto Plus Ultra, together with Francoist symbols: the motto «Una Grande Libre», the Eagle of St. John, and the yoke and arrows of the Catholic Monarchs which were also adopted by the Falangists. In use 1945–1977.

The symbols of Francoism were iconic references to identify the Francoist State in Spain between 1936 and 1975. They serve as visual illustrations for the ideology of Francoist Spain. Uniforms were designed for men and women that combined elements of the earlier Falangist and Carlist uniforms. The state developed new flags and escutcheons based on the traditional heraldry of the monarchy, but now associated with the state. The emblem of five arrows joined by a yoke was also adopted from earlier Spanish symbology, but after 1945 the arrows always pointed upward. This emblem appeared on buildings, plaques and uniforms.

Many statues of Francisco Franco were installed in public places, in part to lend legitimacy to his state. Some towns, streets and plazas were given new names derived from Franco and his entourage. Franco caused many monuments to be erected, some of them substantial buildings. The most imposing is the Valle de los Caídos, the Valley of the Fallen, incorporating a huge basilica built into the side of a mountain. War memorials and plaques commemorating the Nationalists who had died in the Spanish Civil War were installed in many towns and villages.

After Franco's death in 1975, followed by the return to democracy, many symbols of Francoism were destroyed or removed and places renamed. An October 2007 law mandated removal of all remaining symbols from public buildings, with some exceptions for works of particular religious or artistic significance.

== Background ==
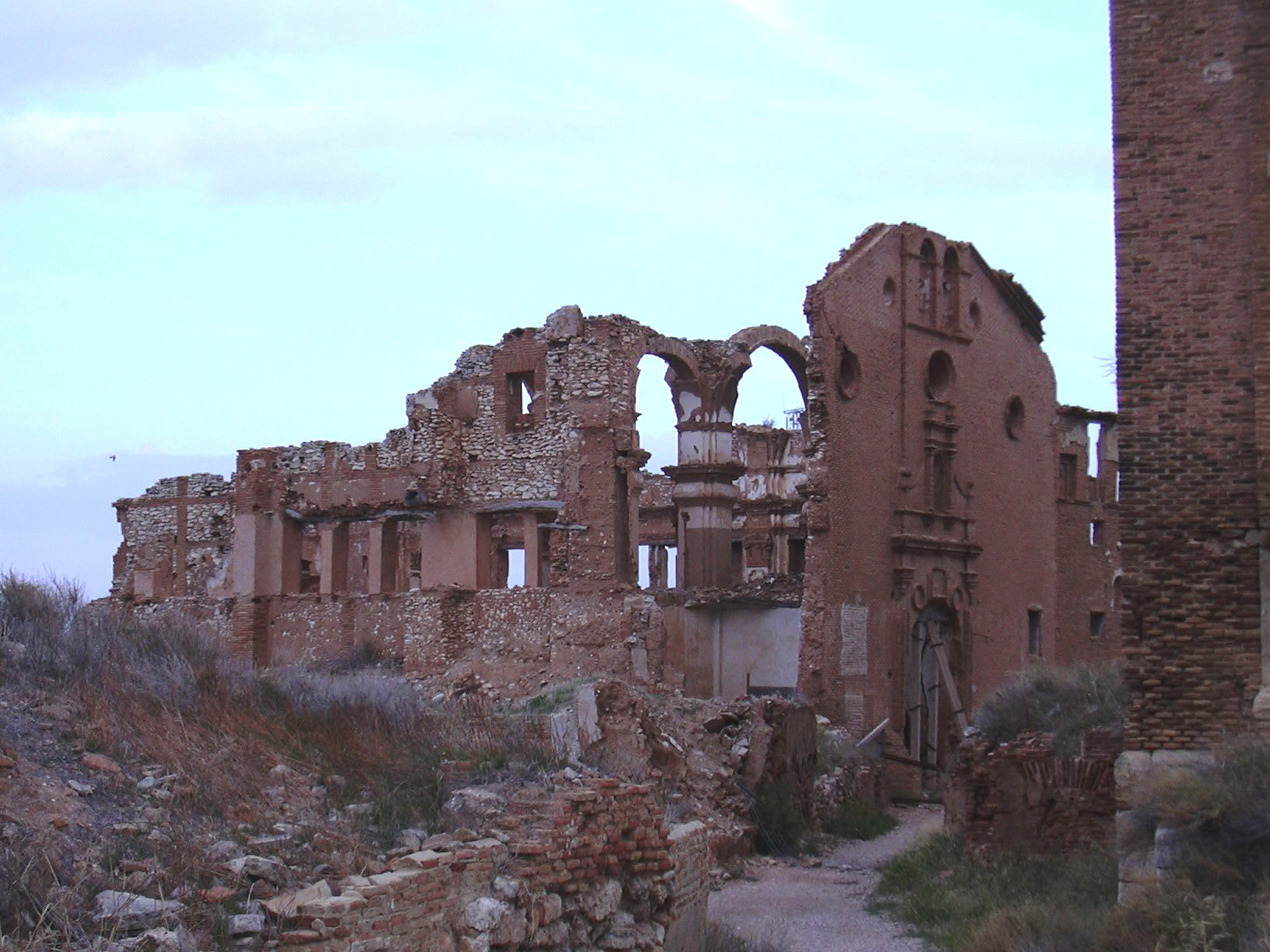
Convento de San Rafael in Belchite, destroyed in the Civil War, now a monument

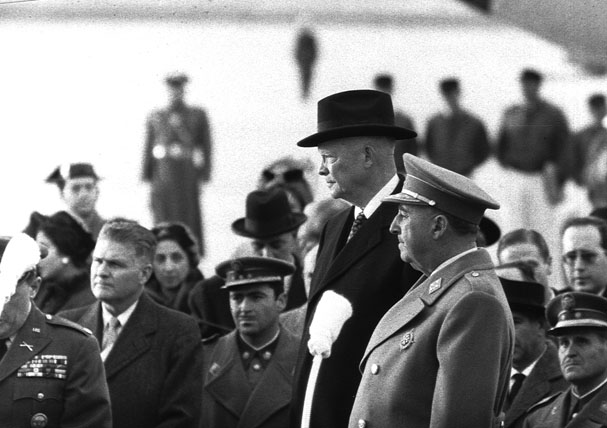
Francisco Franco and Dwight D. Eisenhower in Madrid in 1959

The Second Spanish Republic was established in April 1931 after King Alfonso XIII had forced the dictator General Miguel Primo de Rivera to resign, followed by nationwide municipal elections. The king and the former dictator fled the country when the republic was declared, and the new government inherited a bankrupt state. In an atmosphere of political unrest, opinions were polarized between the extreme right and extreme left, often degenerating into violence. On the right, the traditionalist Carlist movement was revived. In 1933, the aristocrat José Antonio Primo de Rivera, son of the former dictator, founded the far-right Falange movement, similar to the Italian Fascists. In February 1934 the Falange merged with the Juntas de Ofensiva Nacional-Sindicalista (J.O.N.S), another right-wing group. Parallel to this, left-wing trade unions staged industry-wide or citywide strikes, and in Catalonia Marxist and Anarchist groups competed for power. Landless labourers seized land, occupied estates, and burned churches.

On 17 July 1936, at a time of political crisis, General Francisco Franco led the Spanish colonial army from Morocco to attack the mainland, sparking the Spanish Civil War. A bitter war of attrition in which over 500,000 people died, the Spanish Civil War dragged out until 1 April 1939, when the Nationalists led by Franco acquired full control of the country. Franco was supported by the Falange and the Carlist Comunión Tradicionalista, and united the two parties to forming the Falange Española Tradicionalista y de las JONS, or FET y de las JONS, whose official ideology was the Falangists' 27 puntos. The new party was a wide-ranging nationalist coalition, closely controlled by Franco.

Franco had received material support in the civil war from both Adolf Hitler and Benito Mussolini, the fascist rulers of Germany and Italy, but when World War II broke out in September 1939, he cited the exhausted state of his country in maintaining a position of neutrality. In June 1940, Spain changed to a position of non-belligerency, despite pressure from Axis diplomats. After the war ended in 1945, Franco remained dictator of Spain, at first isolated among the democracies of post-war Western Europe. This isolation was gradually eroded by the pressures of the Cold War, with Spain signing a security treaty with the United States in 1953. In the 1960s Spain experienced a boom from a growing tourism industry and from relaxation of trade barriers, modernizing economically and then culturally, which placed pressure on the state's highly conservative values. However, Franco held onto power until his death in November 1975. Soon after, a transition to liberal democracy began. A 1977 amnesty law was passed under which Franco's followers were given immunity for past abuses in return for supporting the transition.

== Uniforms ==
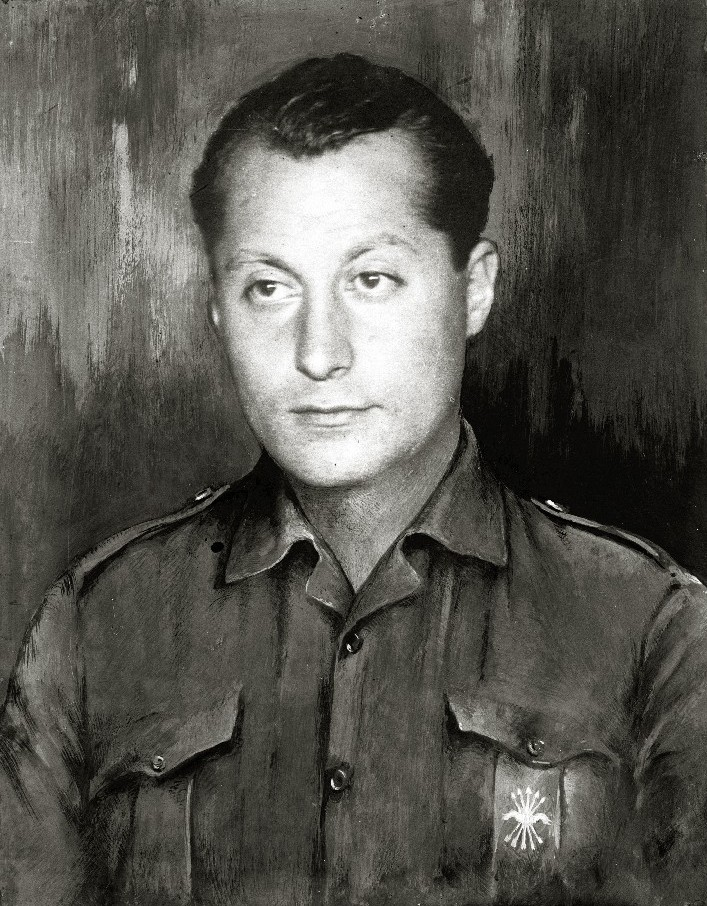
Altered photograph of the 3rd Marquess of Estella ('José Antonio') in the Falange blue shirt

Uniforms were adopted gradually—photographs taken at the founding ceremony of the Falange Española de las JONS in October 1933 do not show anyone wearing a uniform, but a picture of a meeting of the Junta Política a year later shows some (but not all) members in the official uniform. This consisted of a dark blue shirt with epaulettes and long black trousers. The left pocket of the shirt bore the yoke-and-arrows emblem of the Falange. Women wore the blue shirt and a knee-length black skirt, with a leather belt bearing the Falange emblem on its buckle. At a meeting in the Teatro Calderón in Valladolid in March 1934, the hall was filled with banners and insignia and many attendees wore the blue shirts, visually displaying what the 3rd Marquess of Estella ('José Antonio') called the "spirit of service and of sacrifice, the ascetic and military concept of life." Later, upper-class women tended to use Falangist insignia on their clothes as fashion accessories. When Carmen Primo de Rivera, sister of José Antonio, married in December 1938, she had the yoke and arrows embroidered on her wedding dress. After José Antonio died, a black tie was added in his memory.

After the union with the Carlists, the original Falange uniform became important in identifying genuine Falangists. The red beret had become the symbol of Carlism by the 1860s. The new party, commonly known as the Movimiento Nacional, was given a uniform with the Falangist blue shirt, the red Carlist beret and military belts. (Note: The belts were made in the tannery of Estella.) The party symbol was the Falangist yoke and arrows. A portrait of Franco by Ignacio Zuloaga from 1940 shows him wearing the blue shirt, military boots and jodhpurs, and the red beret of the requetés. (Note: The term requeté for the Carlist militia refers to a famous regiment by that name that fought in the First Carlist War.)

== Heraldic devices, symbols and icons ==
Copy of the model of the coat of arms called the "abridged" version for Franco's Spain. Approved in 1938, it was a simplified version of the coat of arms to promote bureaucratic aims. It was used on stamps, lottery tickets, identity documents, and buildings. A popular name for it was "coat of arms of the Eagle".

=== Flag ===
Flag of Spain (1936-1938)

Flag of Spain (1938–1945)

Flag of Spain (1945–1977)

At the time of the Pronunciamiento of 17 and 18 July 1936, the insurgent military forces used the national flag with their coat of arms superimposed: this consisted of the then-current tricolor with the 1869 coat of arms, as had been approved by the Spanish Constitution of 1931. However, in military operations, especially in the air and naval divisions, the insurgents soon experienced confusion in distinguishing their units from those of the government. Also, within the insurgent heterogenic political families, the Carlists in Navarre insisted on going into combat with flags that were red and gold (alternatively, white embroidered with red), known as the burgundy of San Andrés, and these flags included a wide variety of emblems, including symbols of the monarchy and religion, with frequent inclusion of the "Sacred Heart".

The government aimed to resolve this flag situation with the Decree of 29 August 1936, signed by General Miguel Cabanellas, which reinstated the red and yellow flag. There was no reference to the dimensions nor the particulars of the coat of arms, so the insurgent forces employed a host of distinctive coats of arms. To settle this situation, the Junta added an order to the Decree on 13 September 1936, signed by Colonel Federico Montaner. This defined the shapes and dimensions of the Army's flags to conform to the dimensions at the time before the proclamation of the Republic. The coat of arms was to be that of the Republic. Eventually, considering the aims of the Falange, a new design for the coat of arms was formally specified and regulated by Decree number 470, 2 February 1938, signed by General Franco.

=== Escutcheon ===
The escutcheon, popularly known as the "Eagle escutcheon", then representative of the right-wing insurgent group and its ideology, was adopted after the conflict as the national escutcheon for Spain. It included some minor technical improvements which were approved in 1945, during the period of the Francoist State itself and also during the period of democratic transition until 1981. Certain minor changes to the design were approved in 1977, such as making the eagle's wings much more open.

According to the directive of the Franco government, the design of the shield of the national emblem represented a departure from the traditional shield that had been used in its various forms since 1868. In the Franco era, the escutcheon of Spain was associated with the State rather than the Monarchy. Without affecting the basic design, the shield was divided into four with the coats of arms of Castille, León, Aragon and Navarre, plus the «enté en point» of Granada. The inclusion of other historical heraldic elements gave a clear symbolic significance: "The set of arrows and the yoke of the Catholic Monarchs, whose adoption as a badge is one of the great successes of our Falange, must appear on the official arms to indicate what should be the tone of the New State."

The Eagle on Franco's escutcheon had previously been used in the arms of the Catholic Monarchs. The eagle was the Eagle of Saint John the Evangelist, which Queen Isabella I of Castile used on an evangelist escutcheon to which she added the words sub umbra alarum tuarum protege nos (protect us under the shadow of your wings). The heraldry used by Franco was similar to that of the Catholic Monarchs, with the arms of Navarre replacing those of Aragon-Sicily, and with the addition of the Pillars of Hercules and the motto One, Great and Free.

=== Origin of the Yoke, arrows, and Gordian knot ===
The flag of FE-JONS (during Francoism, FET-JONS), with the yoke and the set of arrows. The colour black represents gunpowder and the red blood.

In Spanish heraldic tradition, the yoke, the set of arrows, and the Gordian Knot were elements which were often joined by leaves and the pomegranate, as well as the motto Tanto monta, monta tanto ("equal opposites in balance"), the personal motto and prenuptial agreement of the Catholic Monarchs Isabella I of Castile and Ferdinand II of Aragon as embodied in the song of Pedro Marcuello. This motto was used upon the weapons of both Monarchs from 1475. They made an agreement, now called Concordia de Segovia and the coat of arms is a graphic representation of this pact which united the two most important Monarchs on the peninsula. This iteration is the oldest known image of the escutcheon.

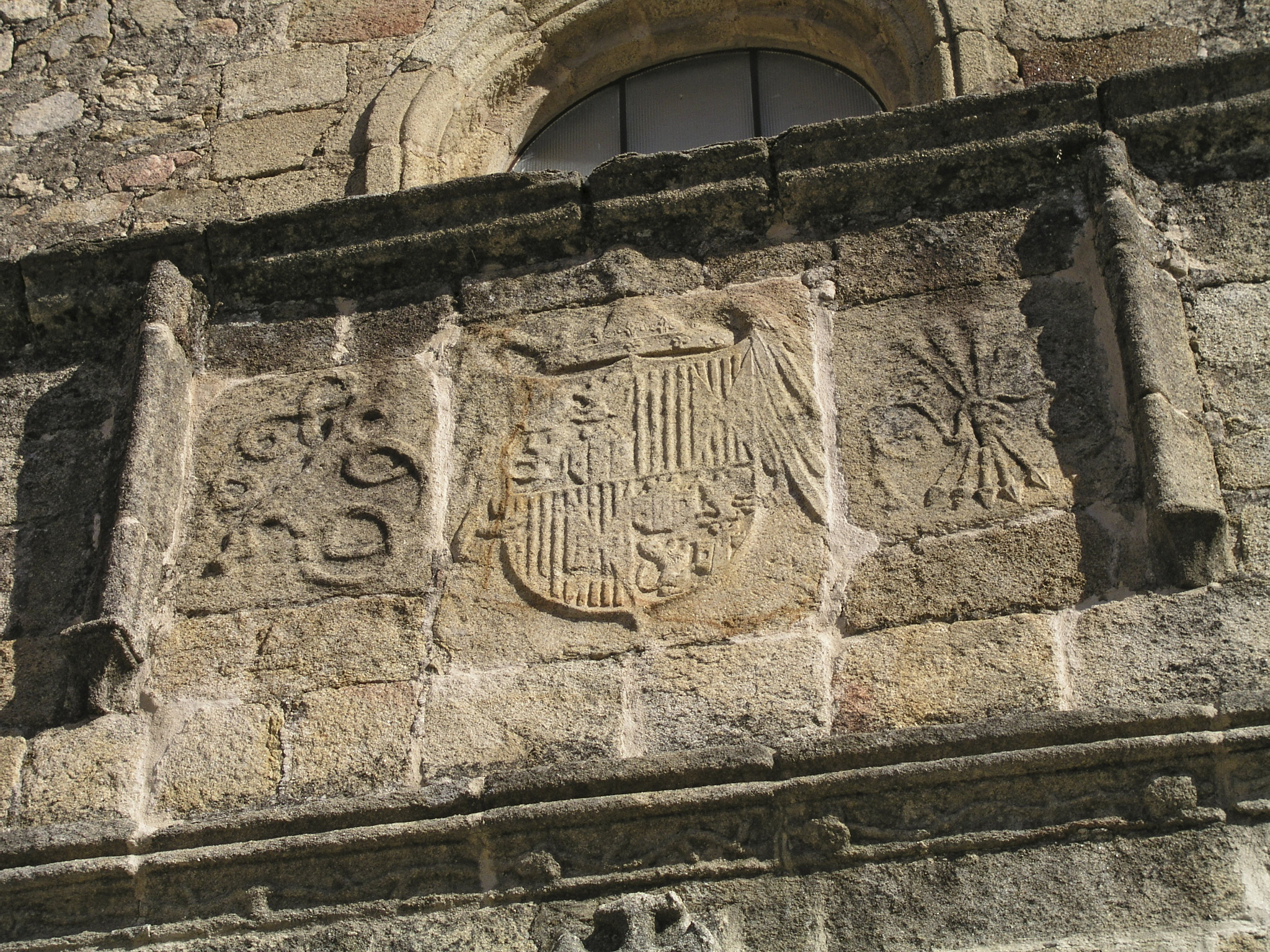
Emblems of the Catholic Monarchs on the facade of the Church of Santiago (Losar de la Vera, Cáceres), c. 1500

The bundle of arrows may have its origins in the Roman fasces, a bundle of rods with the blade of an axe, that were carried before the magistrates to show their power. The arrows previously pointed downward to show that they were ready for use in executing criminals or for warfare. With the marriage of Ferdinand and Isabella, the bundle of arrows meant the union of Castile and Aragon to create Spain—the yoke was Isabel's and the arrows Ferdinand's. The Gordian knot, cut, united the two. The number of arrows varied, but always pointed downwards. Over time, the badge of the Catholic Monarchs spread to other heraldic compositions, and was adopted in some of its variants as the emblems of not only towns and cities such Ronda, Marbella and Málaga, but also to countries like Puerto Rico and the Netherlands.

=== Emblem of the Falange ===
Logo of the Falange Española de las JONS

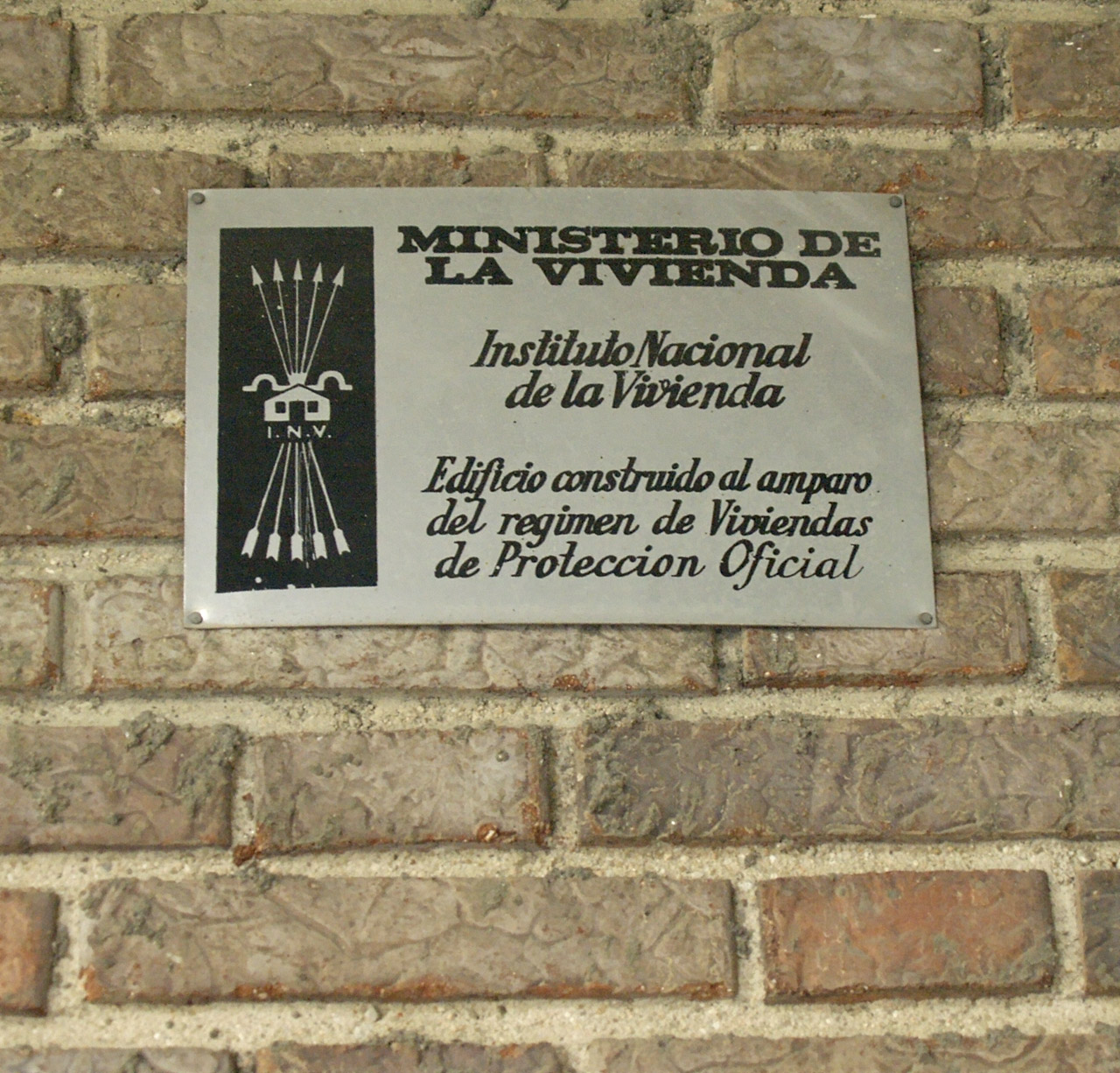
Sign on public housing built during the Francoist State (Madrid, 2007). The official single party used its association with the National Movement, and with it the FET-JONS, to try to carry out National Syndicalists measures, although these had little effect.

The adoption of the arrows and yoke symbol was initially explained by a professor at the University of Granada, Fernando de los Ríos. In a class on political law of the Fascist state and its symbols, he made a drawing on the blackboard of a set of arrows linked with a yoke, indicating that this would be the symbol of Fascism and to have been born or raised in Spain. He said that if ever there was a Spanish fascism, this would be the emblem." Juan Aparicio López, a student attending the class, suggested adoption of this symbol for JONS of Onésimo Redondo and Ramiro Ledesma Ramos (Juntas de Ofensiva Nacional-Sindicalista). He also proposed the 'red and black' and the motto "Spain: one, great and free". The J.O.N.S adopted the yoke and arrows symbol, which immediately became popular due to its geometrical simplicity, warlike symbolism and invocation of a time when Spain was "glorious". The symbol was adopted by the Falange at the time of the merger on 13 February 1934. The yoke and arrows represented the union of the five kingdoms of Castile, Leon, Aragon, Granada and Navarre. Both national unity and the glories of the Ferdinand and Isabella period were persistent themes of Franco's Spain.

The poet and activist Rafael Sánchez Mazas wrote in a 1933 edition of the magazine El Fascio that the reasons for the Spanish Falange's adoption of symbols used by the Catholic Monarchs was because of their origin in the works of the Roman poet Virgil (70 BC – 19 BC). The symbolism of the arrows as an expression of war was used in Virgil's Aeneid, and the yoke, a symbol of agriculture, was based upon Virgil's poem, the Georgics: "We integrate the yoke and the set of arrows into the escutcheon. If the yoke without the arrows is heavy, the arrows without the yoke are in danger of becoming too scattered. We are changing, rather than to a policy, to a discipline, to a behaviour, to a style, to a way of being, to an education." Founders of the Falange ideology, such as José Antonio Primo de Rivera, Juan Aparicio, Ernesto Giménez Caballero, Ramiro Ledesma, Orbegozo, wrote in the journal Fascio that the chosen emblem was also close to that of Italian Fascism.

=== Víctor ===
Detail of the "víctor". It contains each one of the letters in the word victor.

The "victor" is a symbol from the Ancient Roman Empire.

After the Edict of Milan in the year 313 AD, the Chi Rho appeared on coins, flags and eventually also became part of the shields of the Roman legionaries. According to Christian legend, the night before the battle of the Ponte Milvio, the Chi-Rho with the words in hoc signo vinces (In this sign, you conquer') appeared to Emperor Constantine the Great in his dreams. The next day the Emperor replaced the Imperial eagle with the Chi-Rho on the labarum, and he miraculously won the battle. Over time, the symbol was gradually included in varying forms on the Roman crowns. It had become the symbol of the victor and the victorious. From the fourteenth century, it was adopted as the emblem for doctors by some Spanish universities, such as the University of Salamanca and later Alcalá de Henares, and is included in mural inscriptions done in red or black paint that remain there today. Finally, it was chosen as suitable for use in the Victory Parade (May 19, 1939) and thereafter throughout the Franco dictatorship as an emblem of Franco. Mistakenly, it was thought it had been designed by Corintio Haza, who incorporated astrological symbols into the emblem to protect the Caudillo.

=== Guidon, head of State's standard and coat of arms of Franco ===
The personal coat of arms of Franco

The guidon, the personal military flag and standard of the Head of State were created in 1940 and used until Franco's death. The stripe between the two dragon heads separates the two Pillars of Hercules which have silver columns, gold Corinthian capitals and are headed with crowns. The crown nearest to the stripe, which is always on the column placed on the lower part of the flag, is an Imperial crown with a central upright bar. The crown on the other column is a Royal crown, which has a more open top and is always on the column placed on the top half of the flag. The Royal Band of Castile, which was the personal badge of the Castilian Monarchs and later used by the House of Habsburg, was used as the basis for the escutcheon. The standard, the flag which was flown at official residences, in barracks, and on ships of the Spanish Navy, was a square which included the previously mentioned elements. La Banda de Castilla and the Columns of Hercules form part of the personal escutcheon used by Franco as Chief of State. The coat of arms also contained the Laureate Cross of Saint Ferdinand as the supporter, as well as an open crown without arches, known as the crown of military leadership.

== Statues of Franco ==
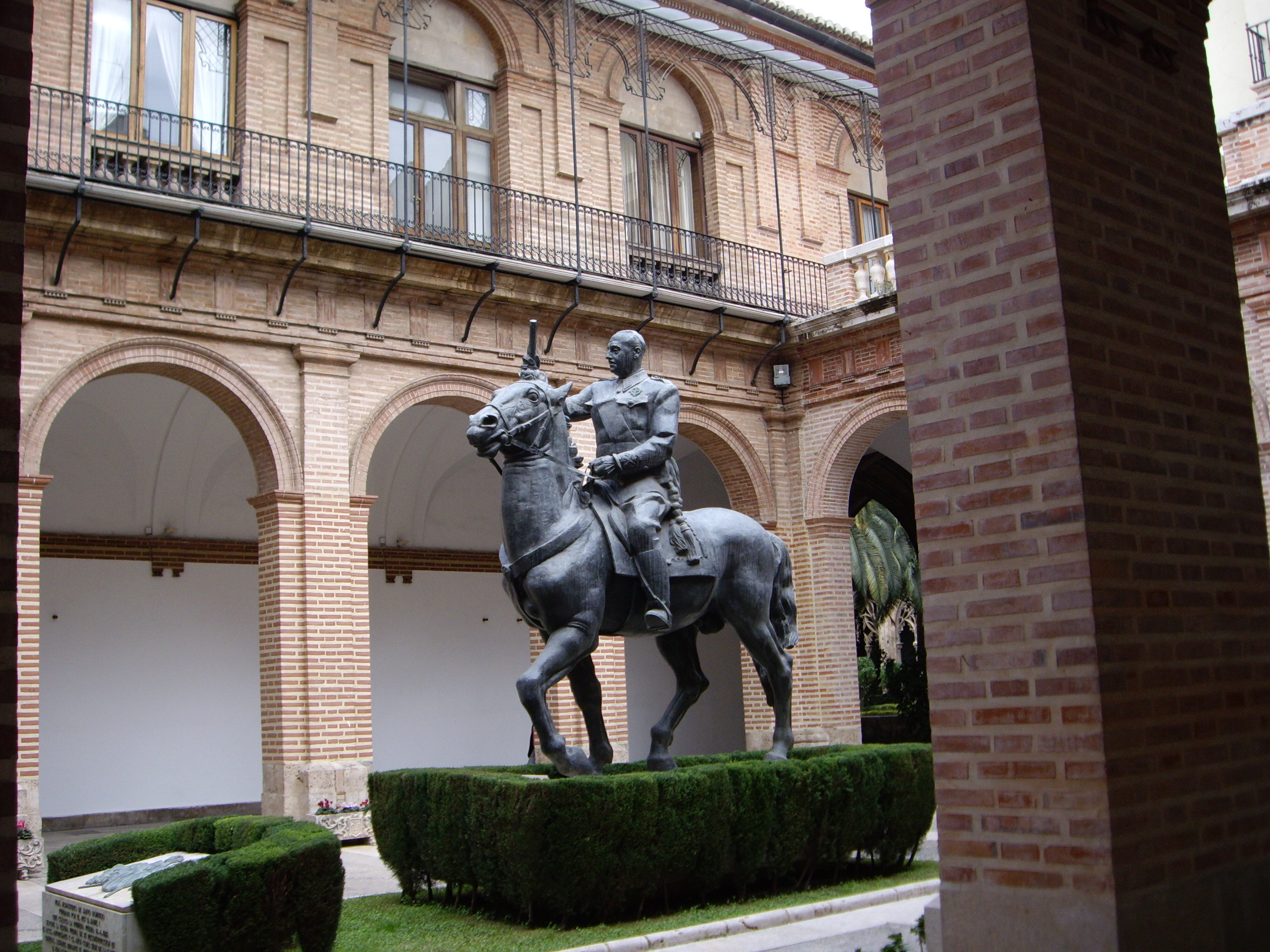
Equestrian statue in Valencia

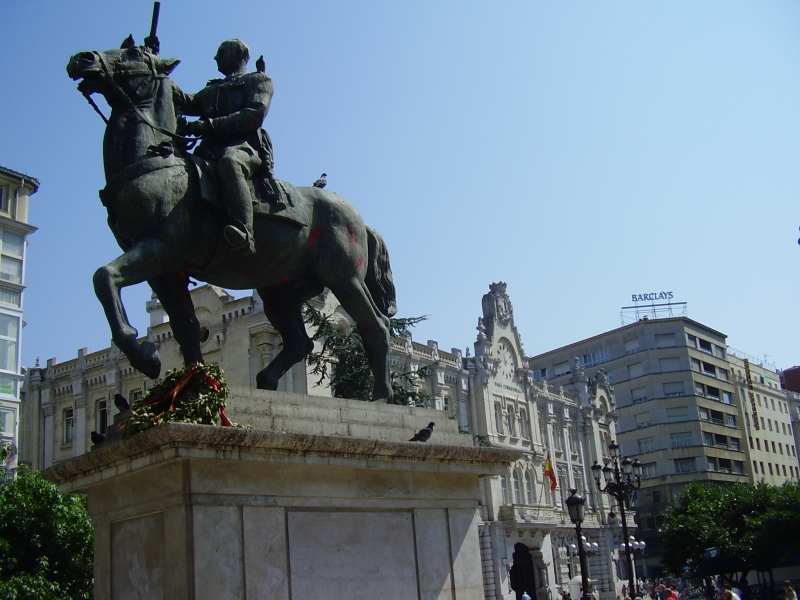
The last equestrian statue of Franco in Santander, removed from the city centre on 18 December 2008

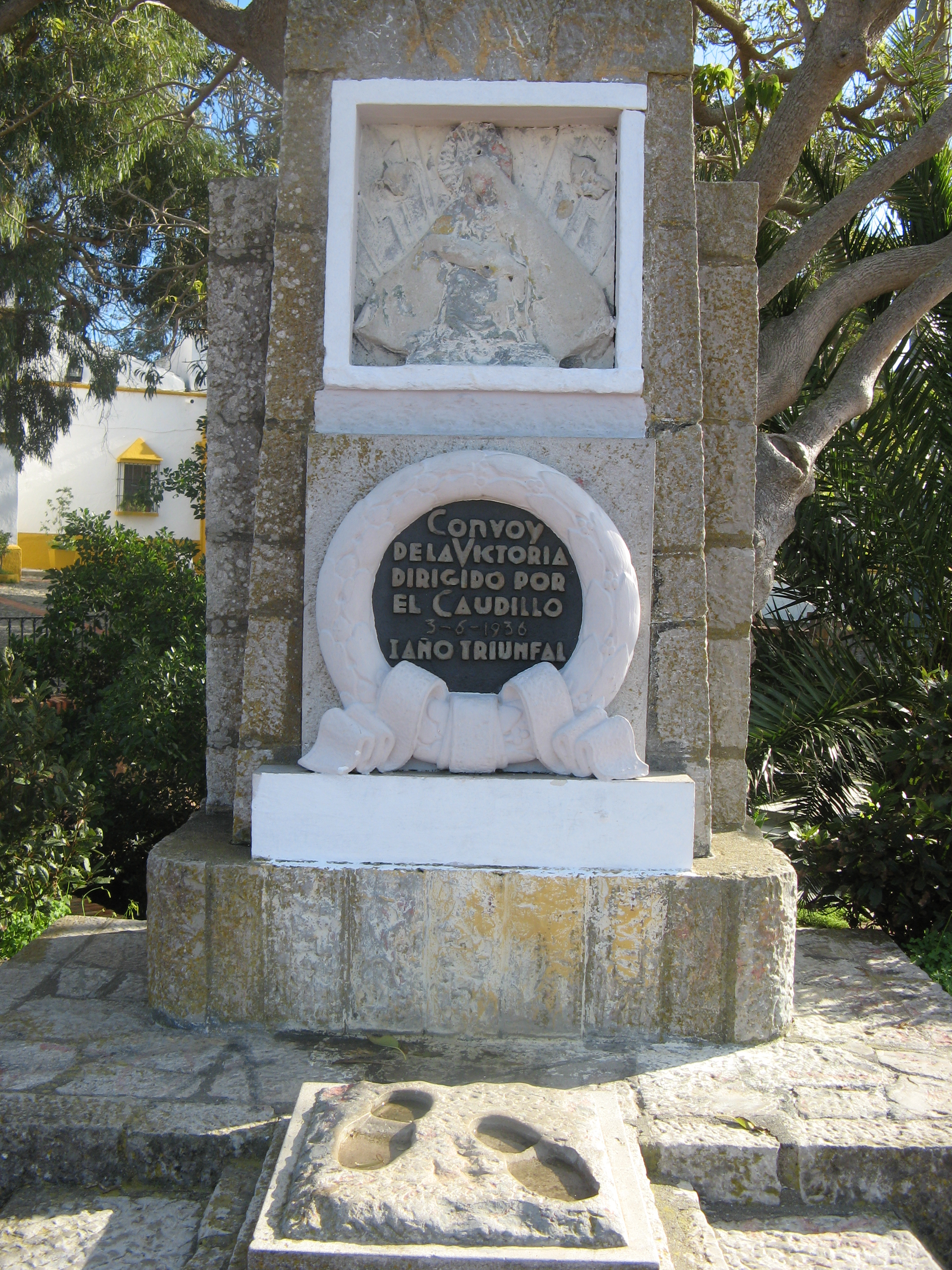
"Franco's Footprints", part of the monument to the Victoria Convoy, in Ceuta. The footprints were filled with concrete in February 2010.

A number of statues of Franco were constructed during his rule. The statues are varied sculptural representations of Franco: busts, full-length standing statues, equestrian statues, etc., which the state placed in many Spanish cities. It has been suggested that up to 1959 (and especially in the 1940s) the purpose of the many statues was to legitimize the state and "perpetuate the memory of victory". It has been further suggested that, in the 1960s, these statues were constructed in tribute to show "appreciation of Franco and his achievements" (in a spirit of commemorating the 25 Years of Peace). In the last period (after the death of Franco and until 1978) the statues were to "secure the memory" of an "unchanging goal".

The most important equestrian statues were placed in prominent places in Valencia, Santander and the Nuevos Ministerios in Madrid. The original was designed in 1959 by José Capuz Mamano. This statue is at the Complutense University in Madrid, with other copies in Barcelona, Zaragoza (1948), Melilla, Ferrol, and the Instituto Ramiro de Maeztu in Madrid (1942, a smaller one than the original and moved to the Infantry Academy in Toledo in the 1980s).

Places where statues can currently be found:

- A Coruña: in various parts of the city, there are sculptures and plaques with the image of Franco on horseback surrounded by the Moorish guard of the Palace of Maria Pita.
- Bétera: a bronze equestrian statue of Franco sculpted by José Capuz Mamano. It was formerly placed in the Plaza del Caudillo in Valencia. In 1983 it was moved to the courtyard of the convent of Santo Domingo. In 2010 it was moved to the present location.
- El Rosario, Tenerife: a bust of Franco, which records that in June 1936, Franco, then commanding General of the Canary Islands, met there with officers of the garrison to prepare for the uprising.
- Ferrol: a bronze equestrian statue of Franco, over six metres high, at his birthplace. Originally placed in the Plaza de España, it is now in the Museo Naval de Herrerías, inside the military naval dockyard.
- Melilla: Melilla retains the only statue of Franco that can be seen standing on a public road and, after being withdrawn in 2005 due to road works that were to take place, was placed back about 50 meters from its previous location. This statue was made before Franco became the Head of State and celebrates his achievements in the Rif War.
- Oviedo: a bronze statue of Franco within the complex of buildings belonging to the Civil Government of Asturias facing the Campo de San Francisco.
- Salamanca: a round bas-relief stone bust of Franco in the DA2 Domus Artium 2002 (a contemporary art museum). On June 9, 2018, it was moved to the current location from the facade of the Pabellón Real in the Plaza Mayor.
- Seville: a white marble statue of Franco with a halo placed on the roof of the cathedral of the Palmarian Catholic Church in October 2014.
- Toledo: a bronze equestrian statue of Franco sculpted by José Capuz Mamano (but smaller in size than the other statues by him) in front of the main facade of the Infantry Academy (where Franco did his military studies). In the mid-1980s it was moved to the current location from the Instituto Ramiro de Maeztu in Madrid.

=== Statues removed ===
- Guadalajara: a bronze full-length standing statue of Franco in the Plaza Fernando Beladíez (as well as a bust of José Antonio Primo de Rivera in the Parco Concordia); removed March 2005.
- Madrid: a statue of Franco in the Nuevos Ministerios at the Paseo de la Castellana; removed 17 March 2005.
- La Pobla de Vallbona: a bust of Franco; removed September 2005.
- Zaragoza: a statue of Franco in the courtyard of the Military Academy; removed August 2006.
- Santander: the last statue of Franco in the city; removed 18 December 2008.
- Ceuta: a monument called "Franco's feet", where his footprints were next to the only shrine in the city; removed February 2010.

== Monuments ==
=== War memorials and Plaques to "Those Fallen for God and for Spain." ===
War memorials and plaques for those "Fallen for God and Spain" were placed in many villages, mostly on the outside of churches. They contained a list of names of the dead people belonging to the Spanish Nationalist party followed by the phrase "Present!", similar to that of José Antonio Primo de Rivera. The plaques, although varied, were usually made of marble and topped with bronze or other metals. The plaques were often placed on the walls of the church, or, if there was a wall nearby, at the burial place of the victims named on the plaque. If there was a cross-shaped monument or low obelisk that recorded the names, a plaque was attached to it. Many places have now chosen to move this type of monument to nearby cemeteries, and in some cases they have been turned into tributes to the "fallen" from both sides. Plaques were also used to commemorate the opening of institutions and infrastructure such as railway lines, stations, reservoirs, etc. The majority of these plaques still exist today. Many of the plaques and monuments are neither maintained nor removed.

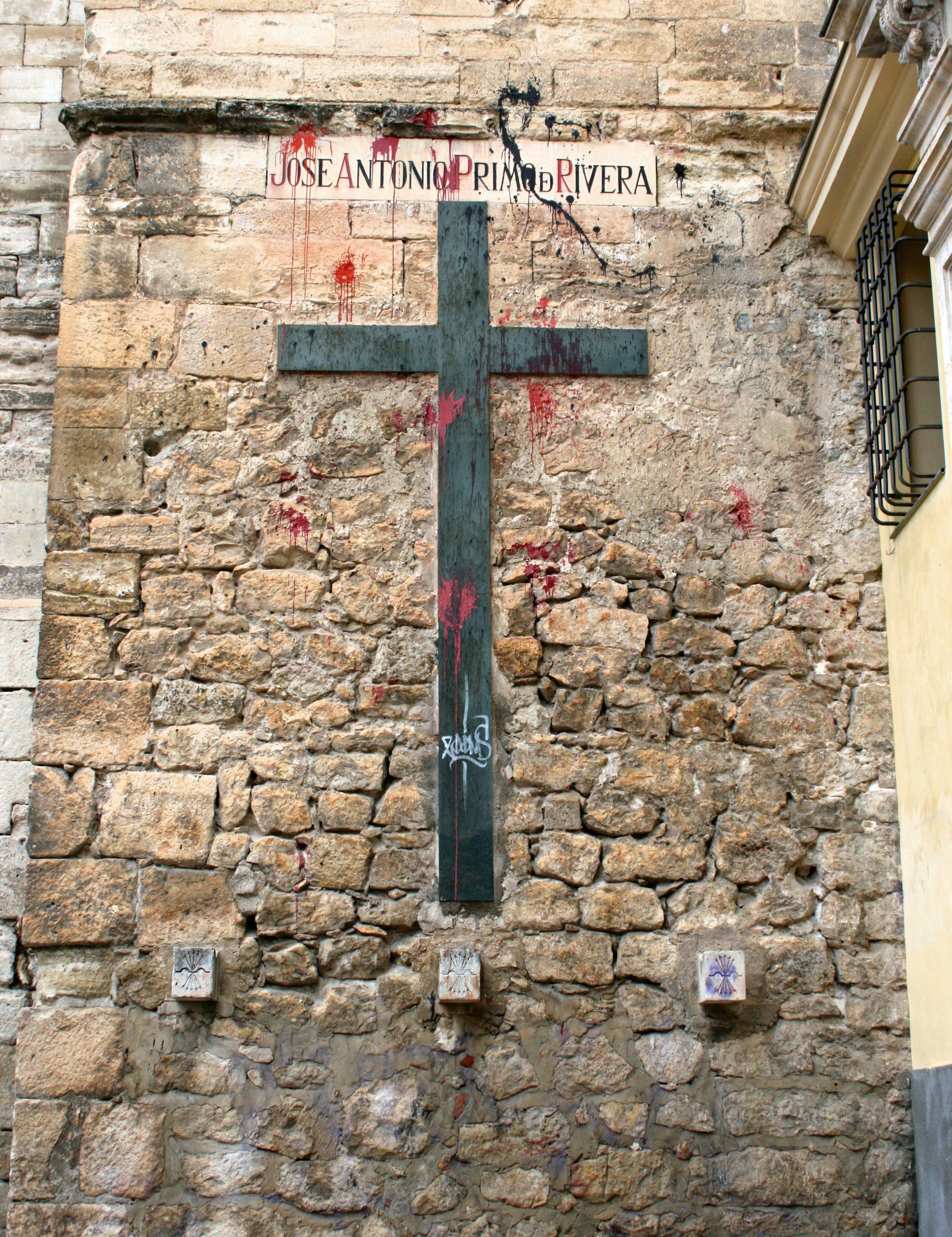
The Cross in the Cathedral of Cuenca which is stained with red paint.

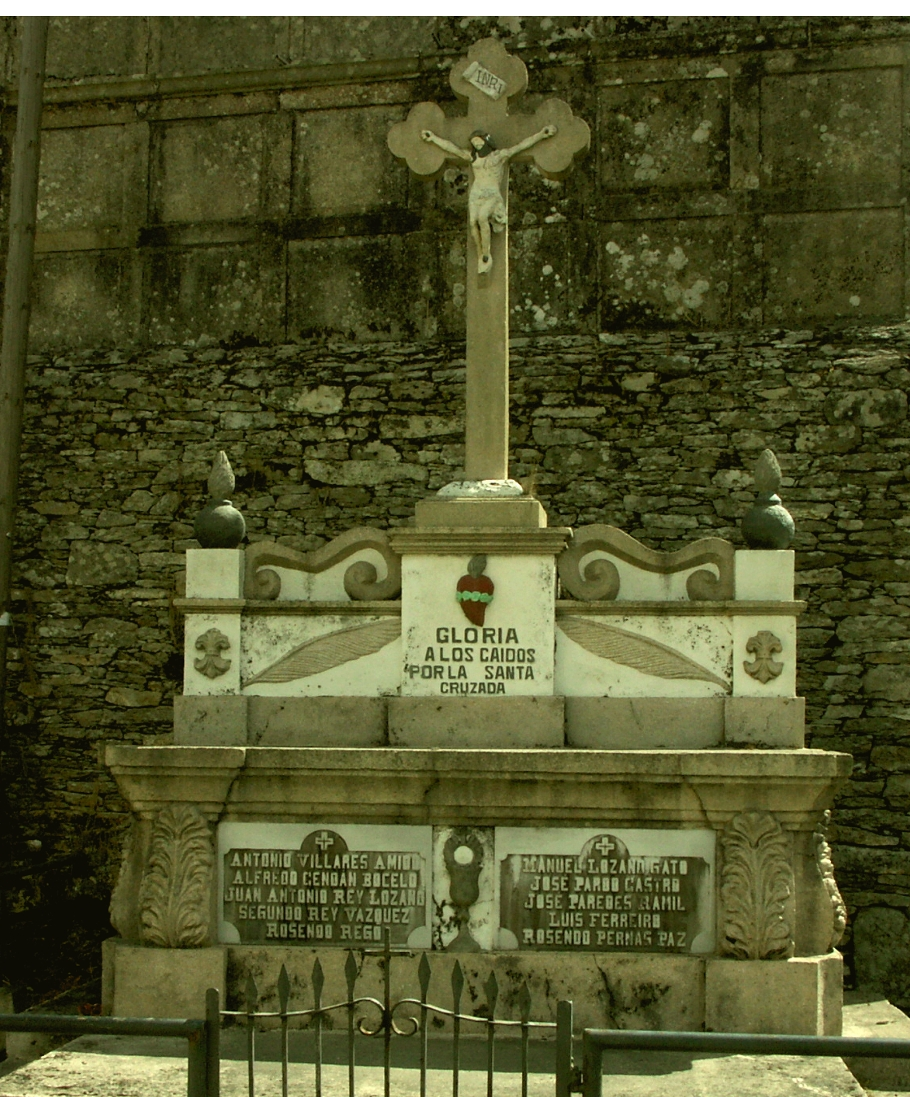
Monument to the fallen, located in the cemetery of Goiriz, Villalba, Lugo.

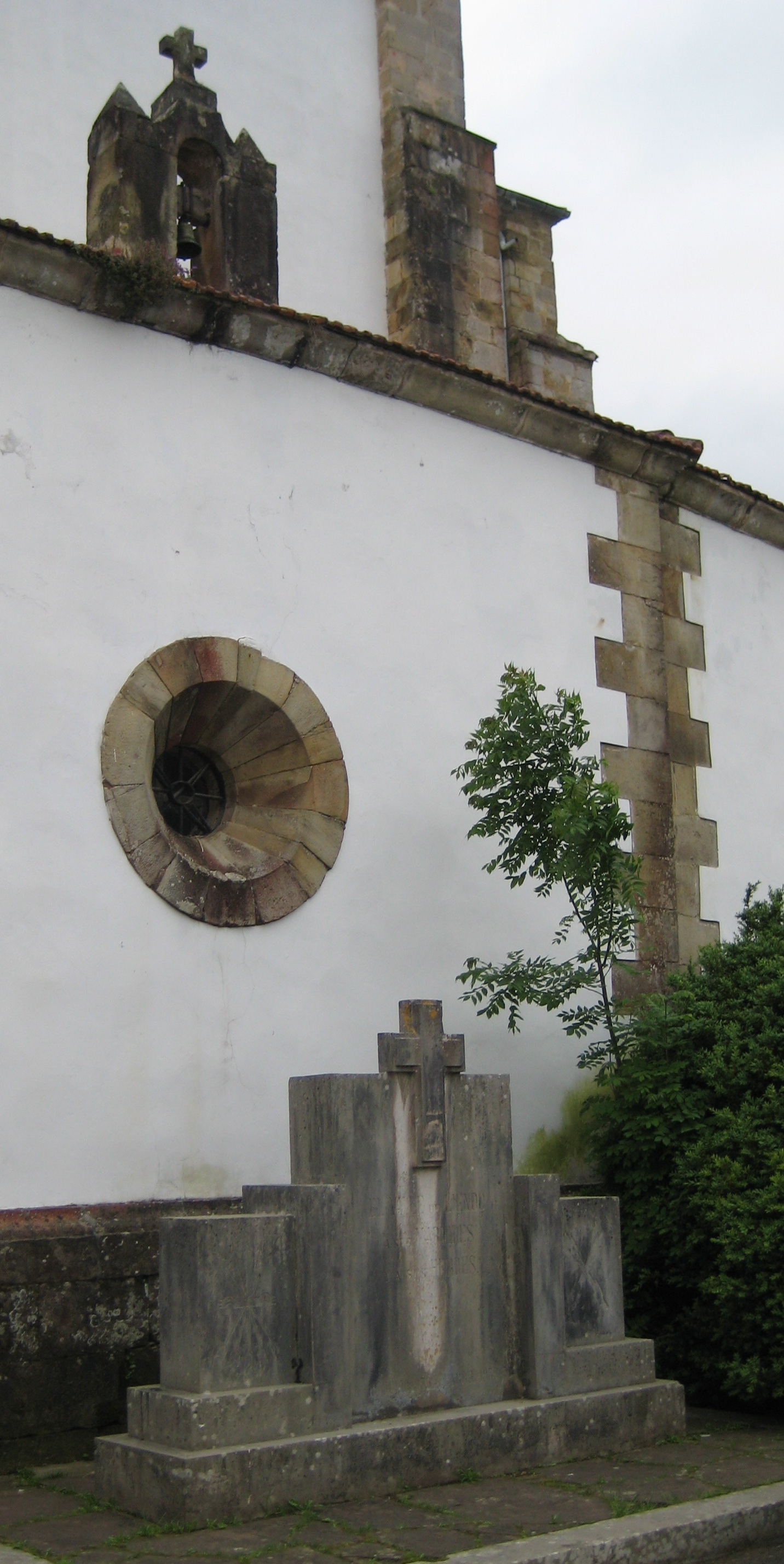
Monument to the fallen of Liendo, Cantabria.

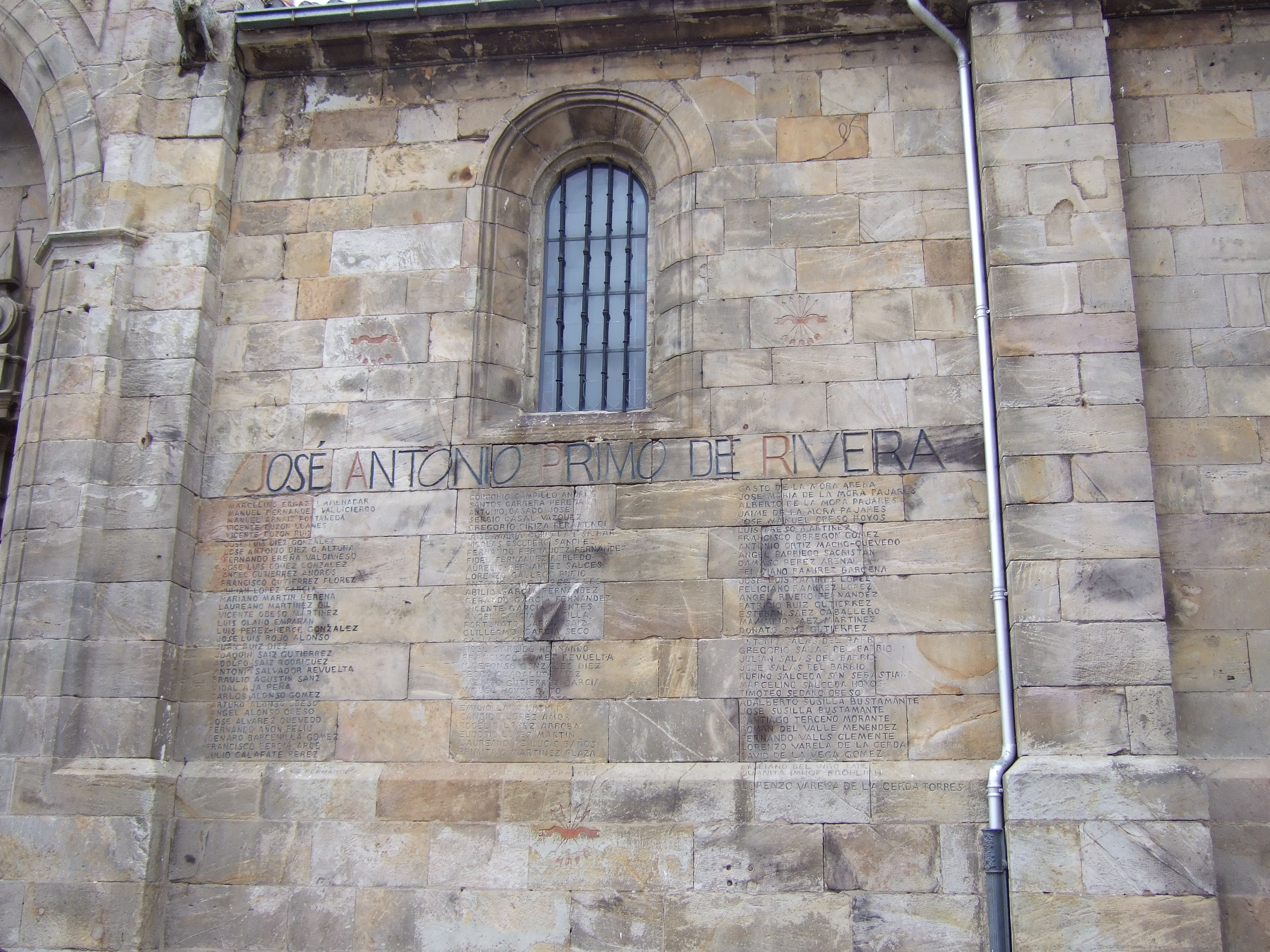
List of the fallen, inscribed in a church of Reinosa, Cantabria.

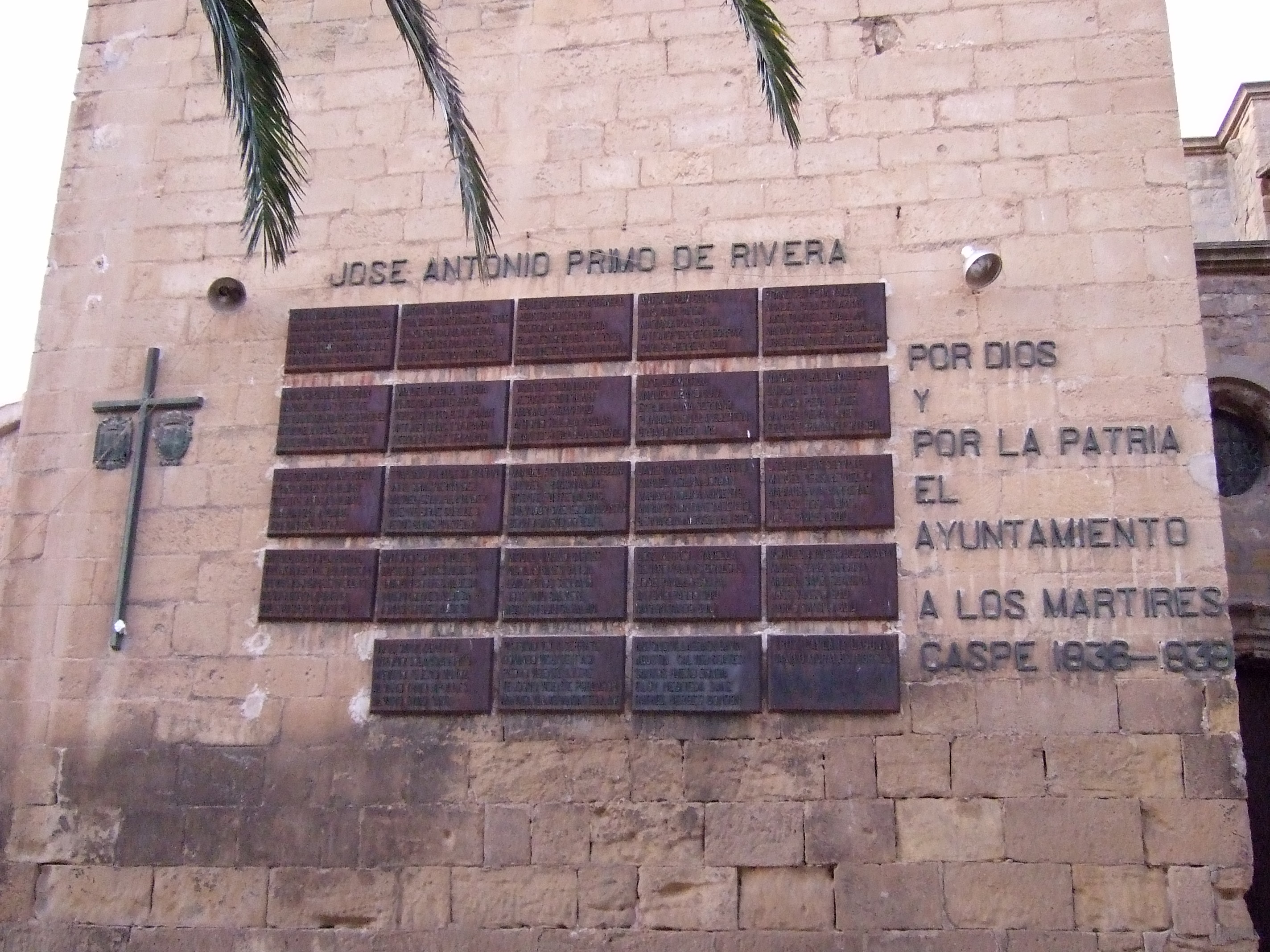
Plaques listing the fallen of Caspe, Zaragoza.

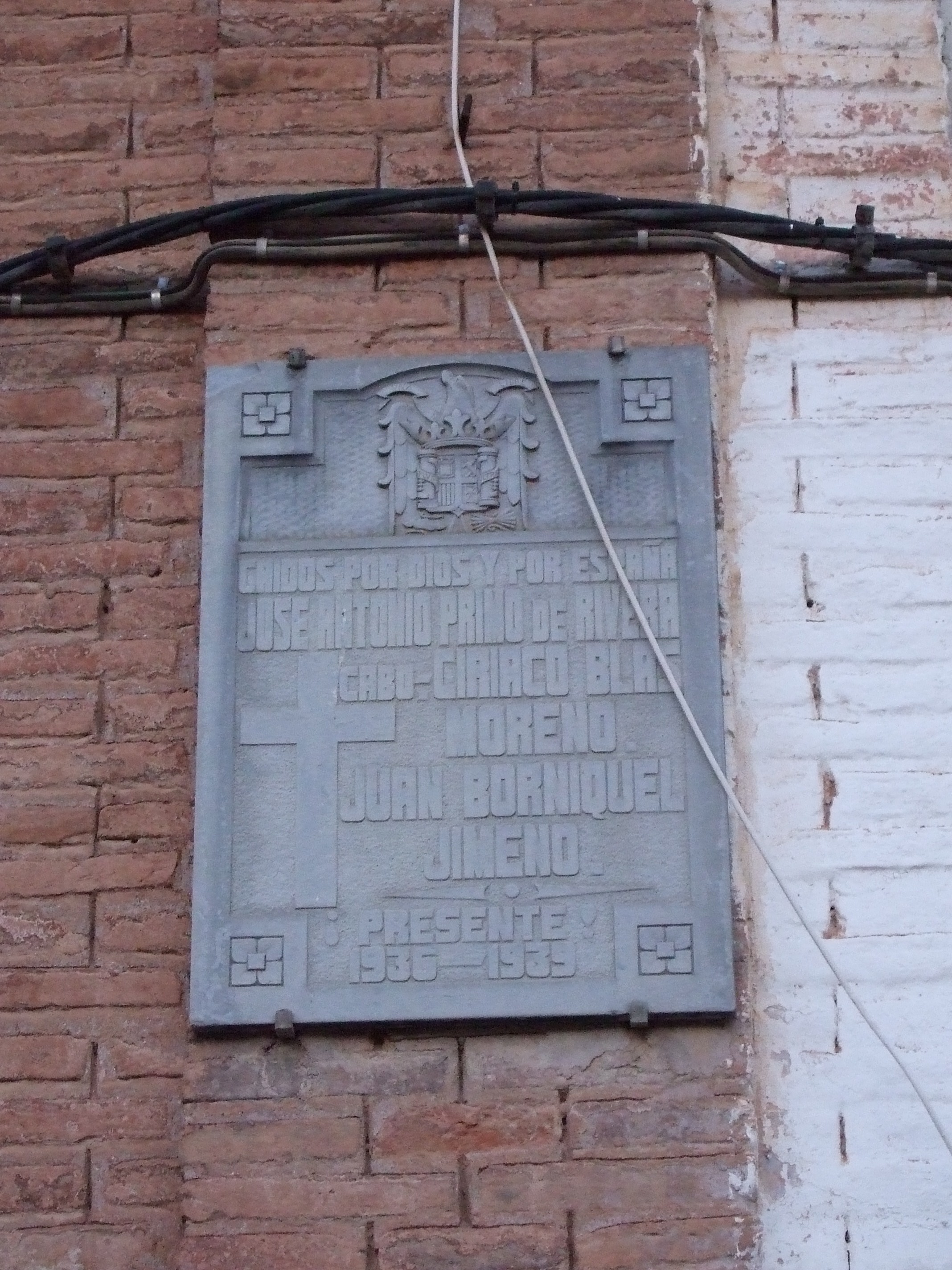
Tombstone in Chodes, Zaragoza.

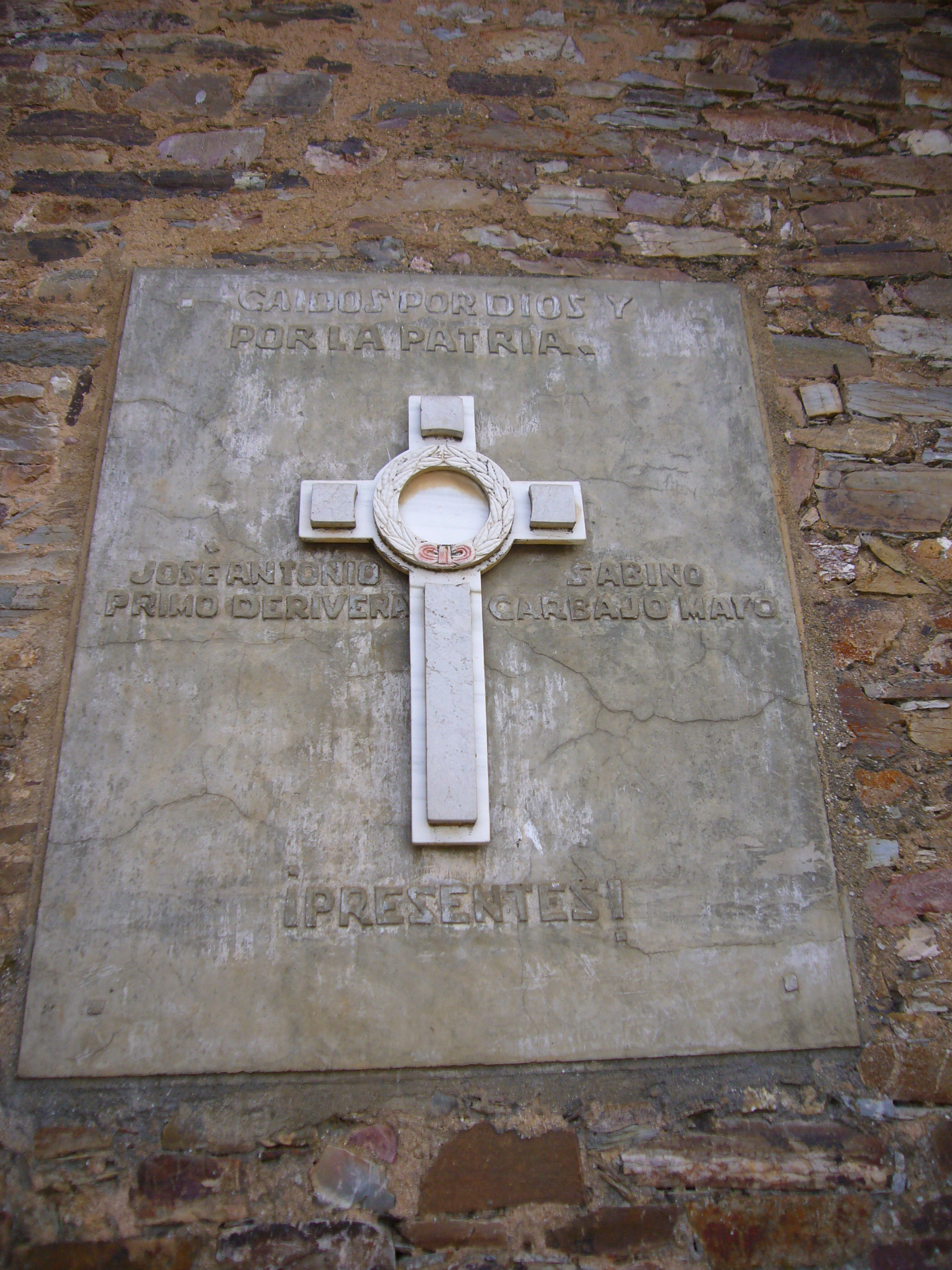
Ferreruela, Zamora.

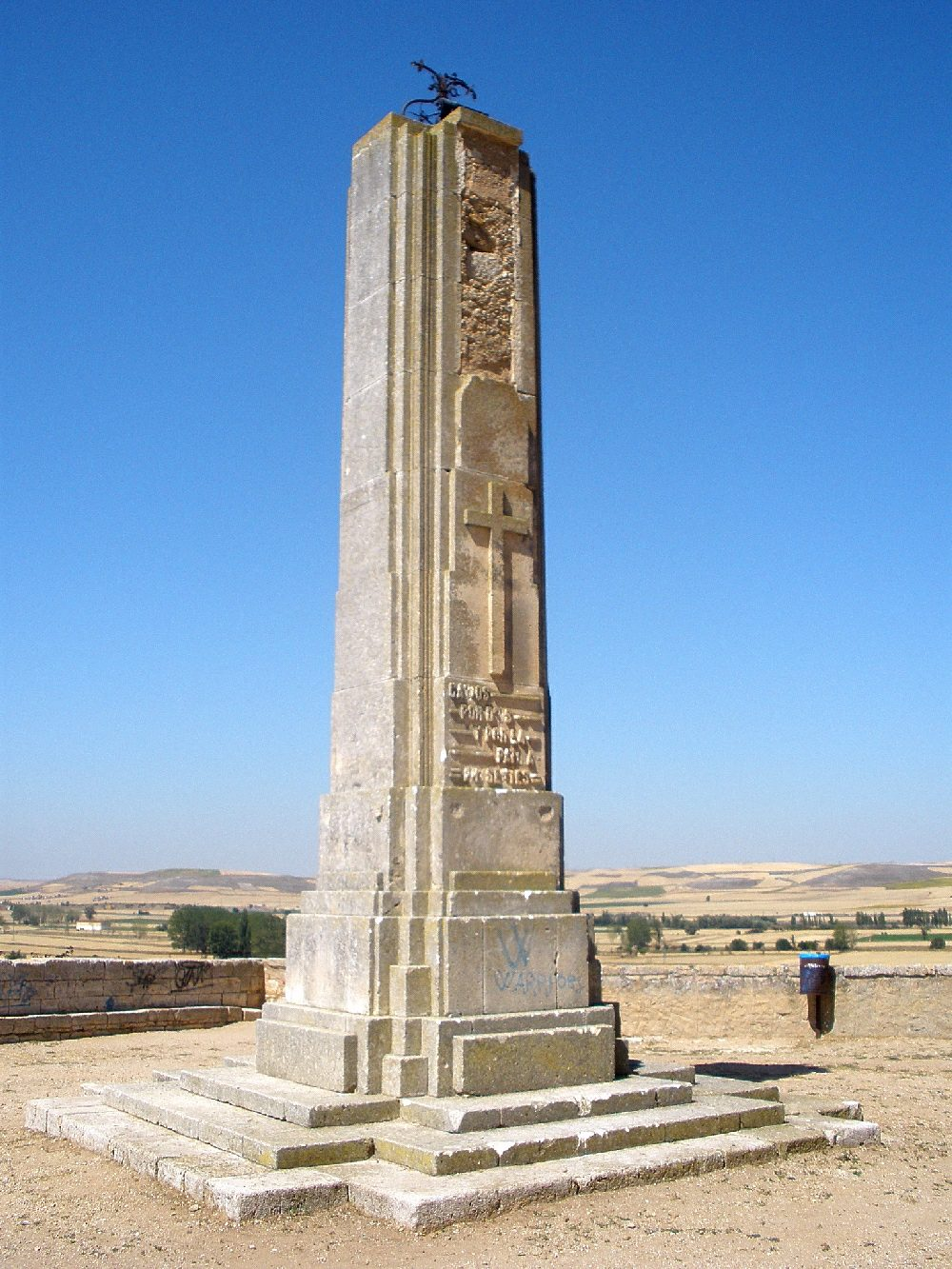
Pampliega, Burgos.

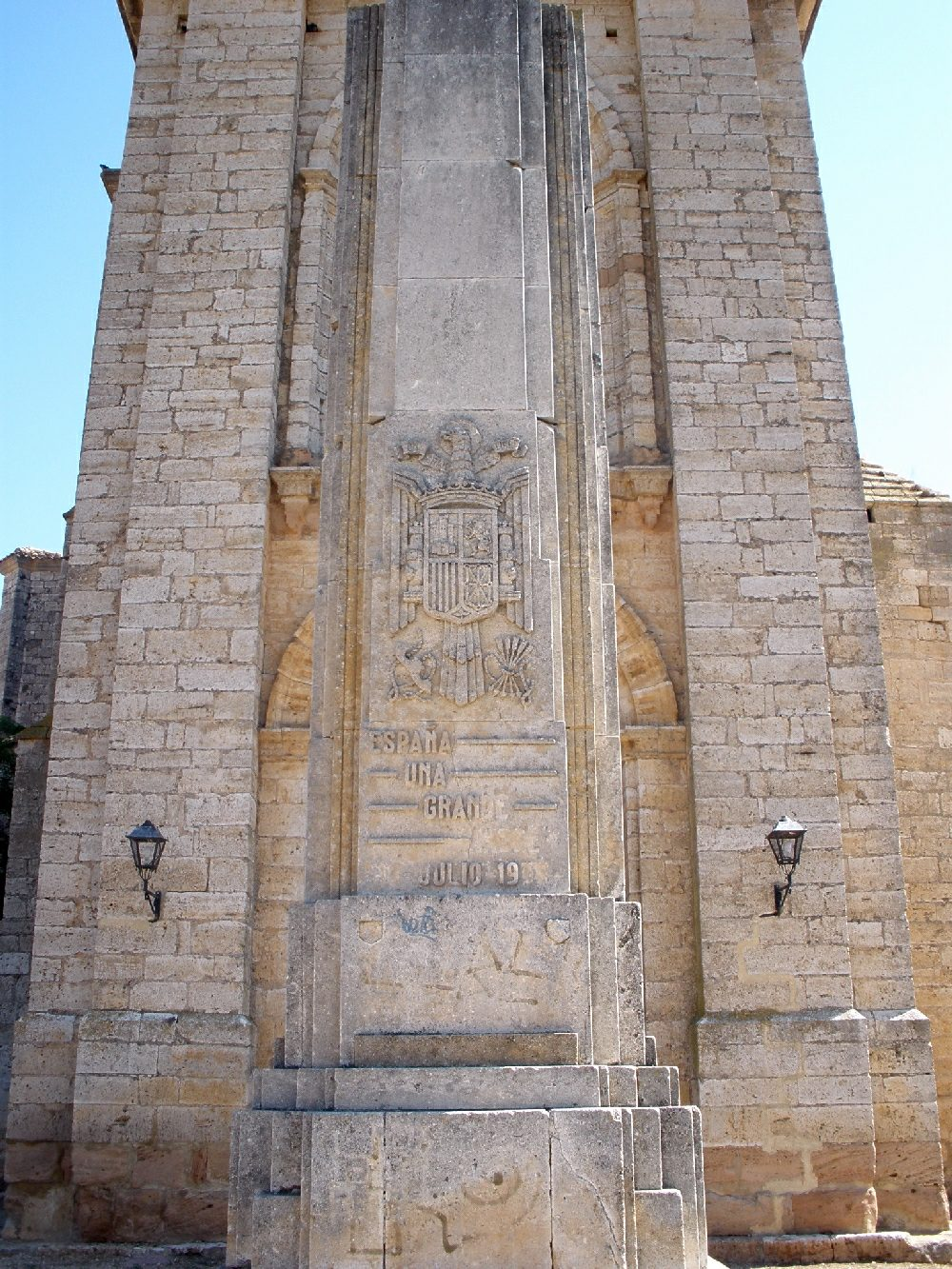
Pampliega, Burgos.

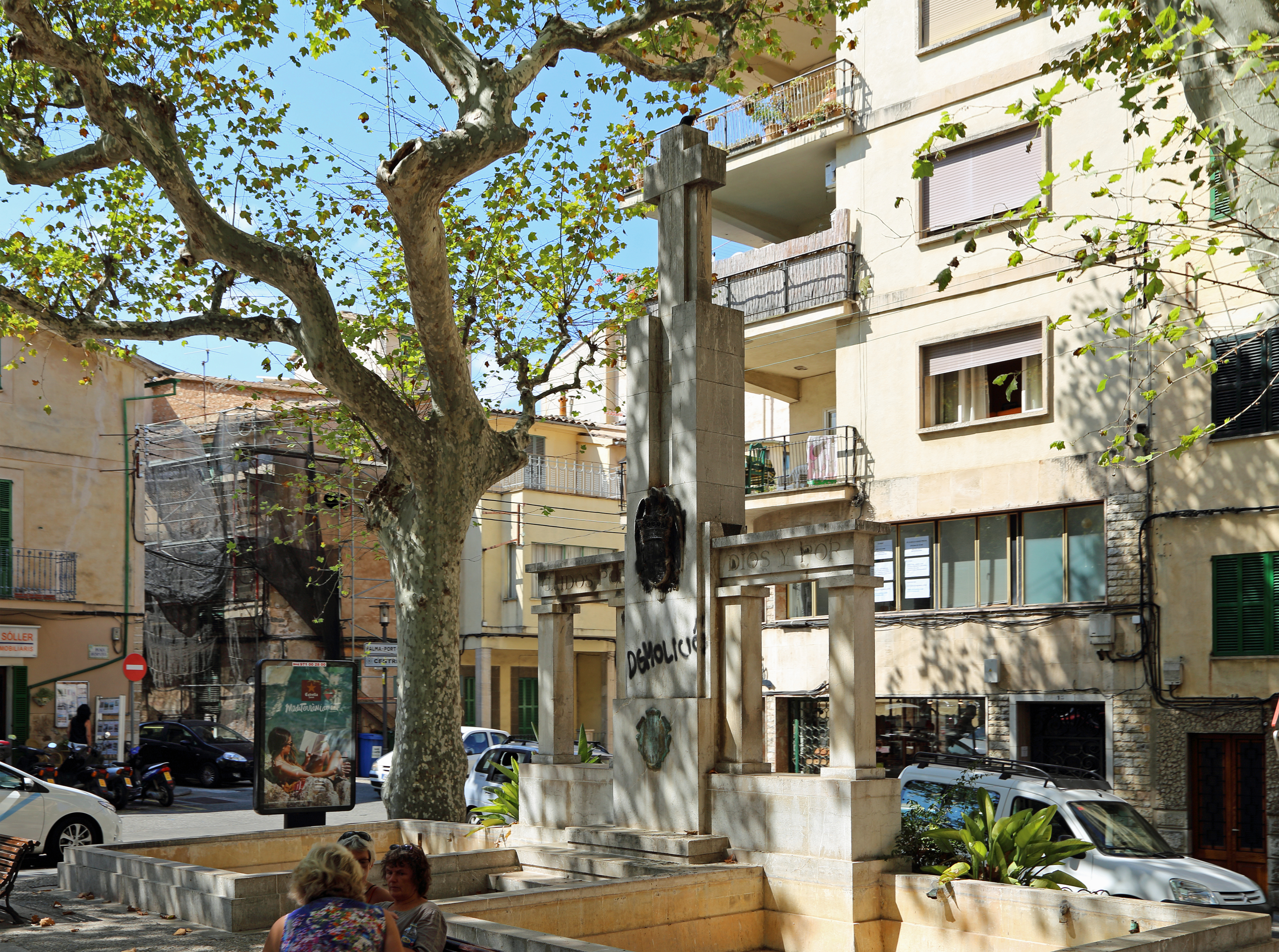
Sóller (Mallorca), monument a los Caídos on Plaça d'Espanya; the 'coat of arms of the Eagle' has been vandalised.

=== The Victory Arch ===
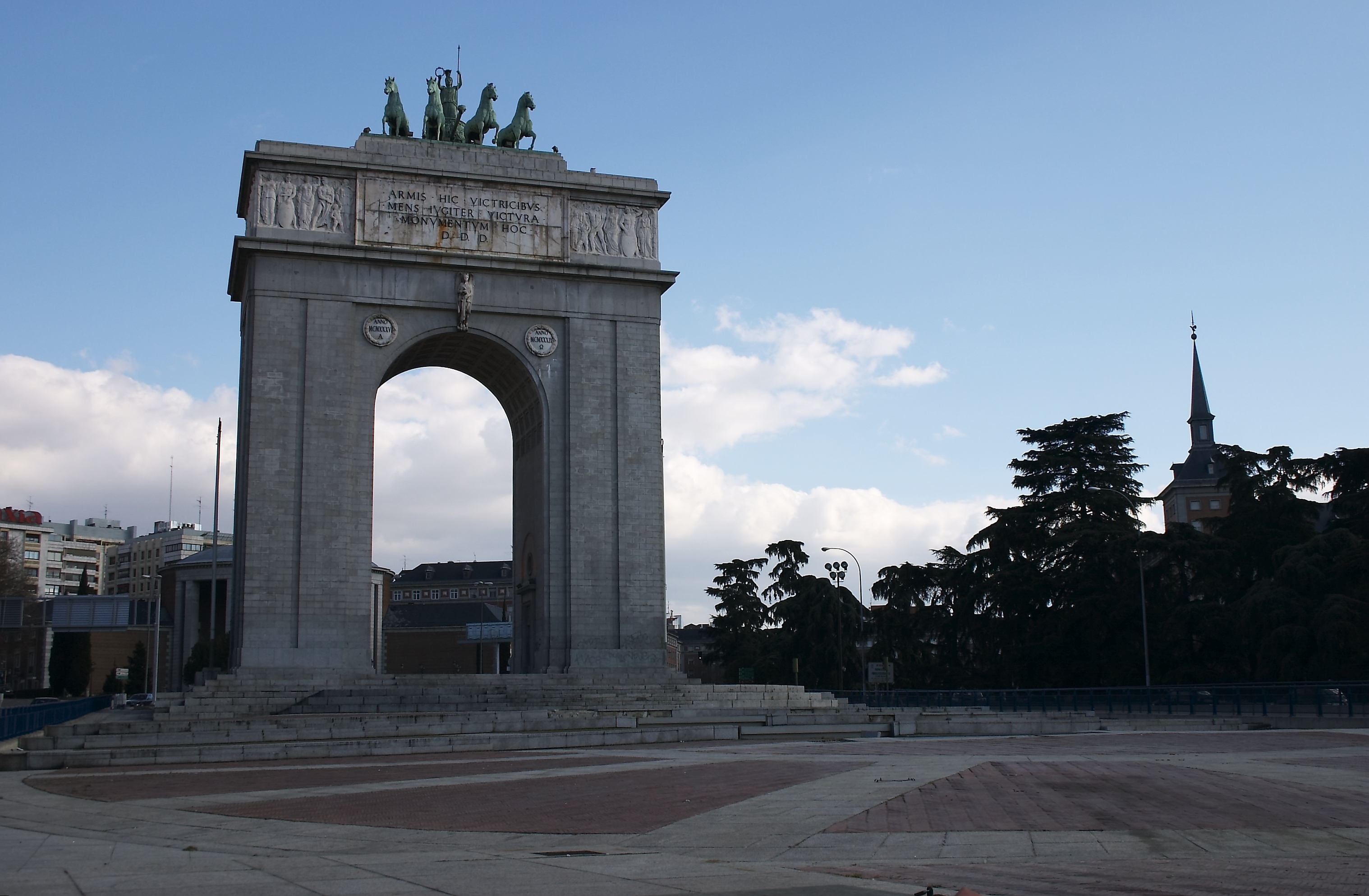
Victory Arch (Madrid)

The Victory Arch of Madrid (Arco de la Victoria de Madrid) is situated in the Moncloa-Aravaca district of Madrid. The monument was built between 1953 and 1956 by order of Franco to commemorate his victory in the Spanish Civil War. The 40 metre (130 ft.) high arch commemorates the nationalist victory in the Battle of Ciudad Universitaria, in which the University City was destroyed. Inscriptions in Latin describe the victory and the construction of the new University City. Behind it is the Monument to the Fallen from Madrid, designed in 1949 by the architect Manuel Herrero de Palacios, a monumental circular building roofed with a cupola. Today it is the home of the municipal council of the Moncloa - Aravaca district.

=== Monument to the Fallen in Pamplona ===
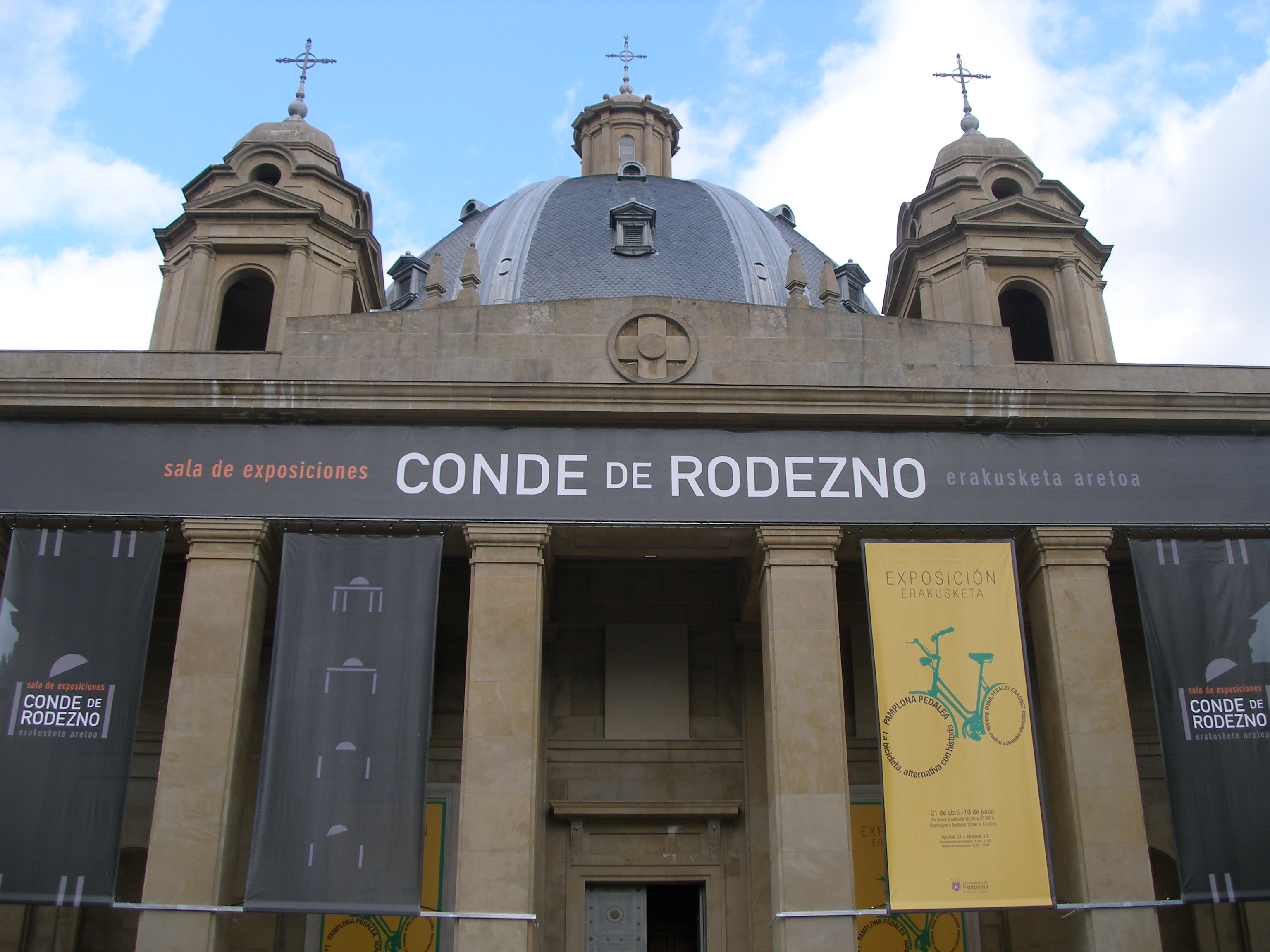
Monument to the Fallen in Pamplona, Spain

Popularly known as the Monument to the Fallen, the actual name of this monument is Navarra a sus Muertos en la Cruzada (Navarre to its Dead in the Crusade), as indicated on its facade. The building was erected in memory of the dead from Navarre, a Nationalist stronghold during the Civil War, and is located in the heart of the city of Pamplona, the capital of Navarre. The building was designed by the architects Victor Eusa and José Yamoz. The names of the 5,000 people of Navarre who died in combat in the civil war were inscribed on its walls, but today they are covered by a sheet. Today the building is known as the Sala de Exposiciones Conde Rodezno (Conde Rodezno Exhibition Hall) and is used for small municipal exhibitions.

=== Cuartel de la Montaña ===
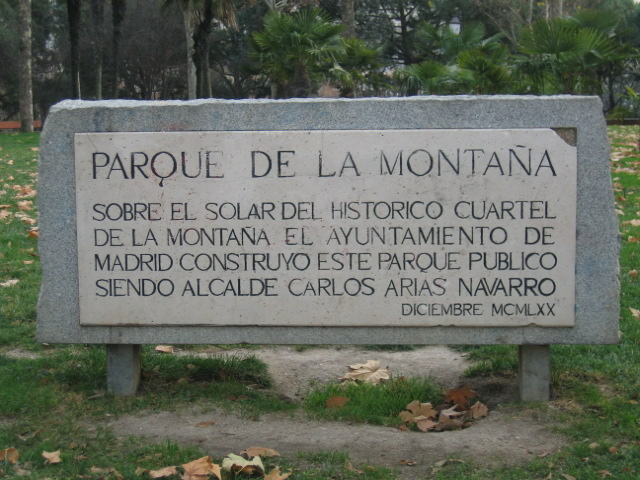
Commemorative plaque

The Cuartel de la Montaña was a military building in Madrid that achieved notoriety as the place where the military uprising of July 1936 began in the city. On July 19, 1936, in Madrid, General Fanjul, charged with the uprising of the city, came in civilian clothes to Cuartel de la Montaña. Instead of going out with troops to take the vital points of the capital, he simply proclaimed a state of war and took power with 1,500 men (of whom there were about 140 officers) and approximately 180 Falangists from the Cuartel de la Montaña.

That afternoon, the base was surrounded by poorly armed troops and civilians loyal to the government of the Republic. At dawn on 20 July, shelling of the barracks began. The rebels resisted for only a few hours. Differences of opinion led some rebels to fly the white flag while others were firing on the attackers. The garrison fell, being almost completely destroyed. The entry of the attacking forces resulted in the murder of most of the officers (ninety of one hundred forty) and the Falangists. There were between 150 and 300 dead.

The building, which had been mostly destroyed during the siege, suffered the impact of numerous artillery attacks during the war because of its proximity to the frontlines, which were more or less unchanged since early 1937. Towards the end of the war the building was reduced to ruins, which could still be seen in the early Sixties. A park, the Parque del Cuartel de la Montaña, was inaugurated on 20 July 1972, when Franco was still in power and Carlos Arias Navarro, the future prime minister, was mayor of Madrid. It incorporates a monument by Joaquín Vaquero Turcios, also from 1972, in memory of those who died in its defence. This monument consists of a bronze figure representing the body of an injured man at the centre of a wall sculpted in the form of sandbags.

=== Ruins of Belchite ===
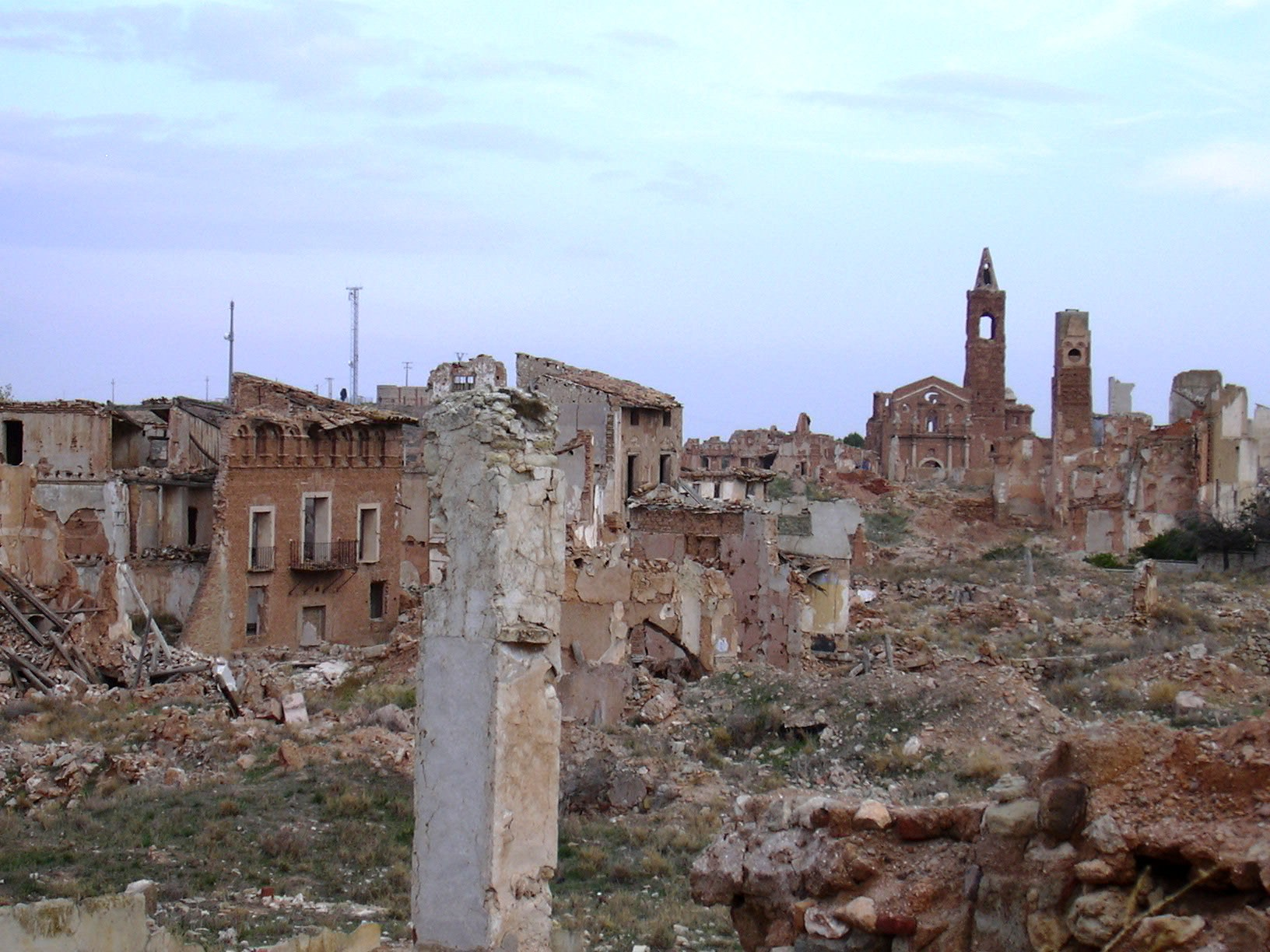
Ruins of Belchite

The Battle of Belchite occurred during the Republican offensive in Aragon that started in August 1937, with Zaragoza as the target. For various reasons, including heat, lack of water, and the military superiority of the Nationalists, the offensive was unsuccessful. Starting on 1 September 1937, the Republicans concentrated on Belchite, with an intense artillery bombardment combined with aerial bombing. The town was totally ruined and 6,000 people had died when the defenders surrendered on 6 September 1937. Although the outcome was a Republican victory, the delay caused by the battle gave the Nationalists time to regroup and prevent the advance to Zaragoza.

Franco decreed that the original town be left in its state of ruin as a monument. Republican prisoners were made to build a new town of Belchite, but the original town has not been rebuilt. The ruins remain as a monument that attracts small numbers of battlefield tourists each year.

=== Monuments for the Battle of Ebro ===
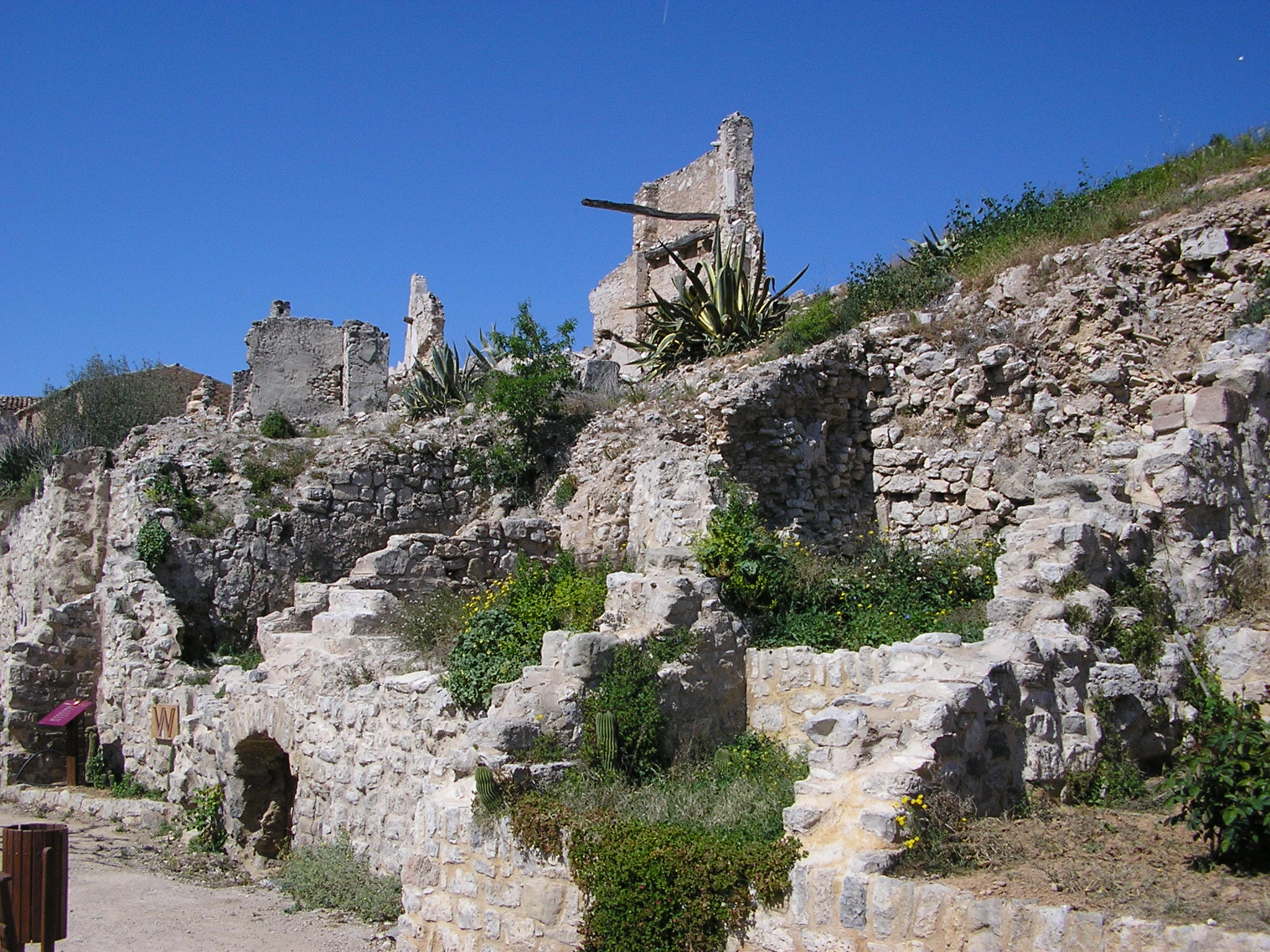
Ruin of Corbera de Ebro

The bloodiest battle of the Civil War, known as the Battle of Ebro, was fought on the left bank of the river Ebro.

- In memory of General Franco's victory, the town of Corbera de Ebro was left just as it had been after the battle.
- At an elevation of 427 metres at Quatre Camins, a stone cross stands in memory of the Third Requetes of Our Lady of Montserrat, the Carlist Nationalist unit formed by Catalan volunteers, which suffered heavy casualties in this place. A red St. Andrew's Cross stands on the pedestal.
- At an elevation of 481 metres in Punta Targa, a monument stands for the brotherhood of the Third Requetes of Our Lady of Montserrat. The base of the monument is an ossuary containing the remains of combatants from both sides.
- At the crossroads for Faterella and Villalba de los Alcores there is a monolith erected in memory of the soldiers of the 4th Division of Navarre who died in on the banks of the Ebro.
- At Coll del Moro, on the outskirts of Gandesa, a monolith from 1953 marks the position from which Franco personally led the final attack. The monument has been vandalized with graffiti both for and against Franco's Spain.
- On one of the peaks of Puig de l'Àliga near Gandesa, there is another monument, but the original inscription has been lost over time.
- In Prat de Compte, in front of the local school, there is a cross in memory of the 'Fallen for God and for Spain'.

=== Monument for the Massacre of Paracuellos ===
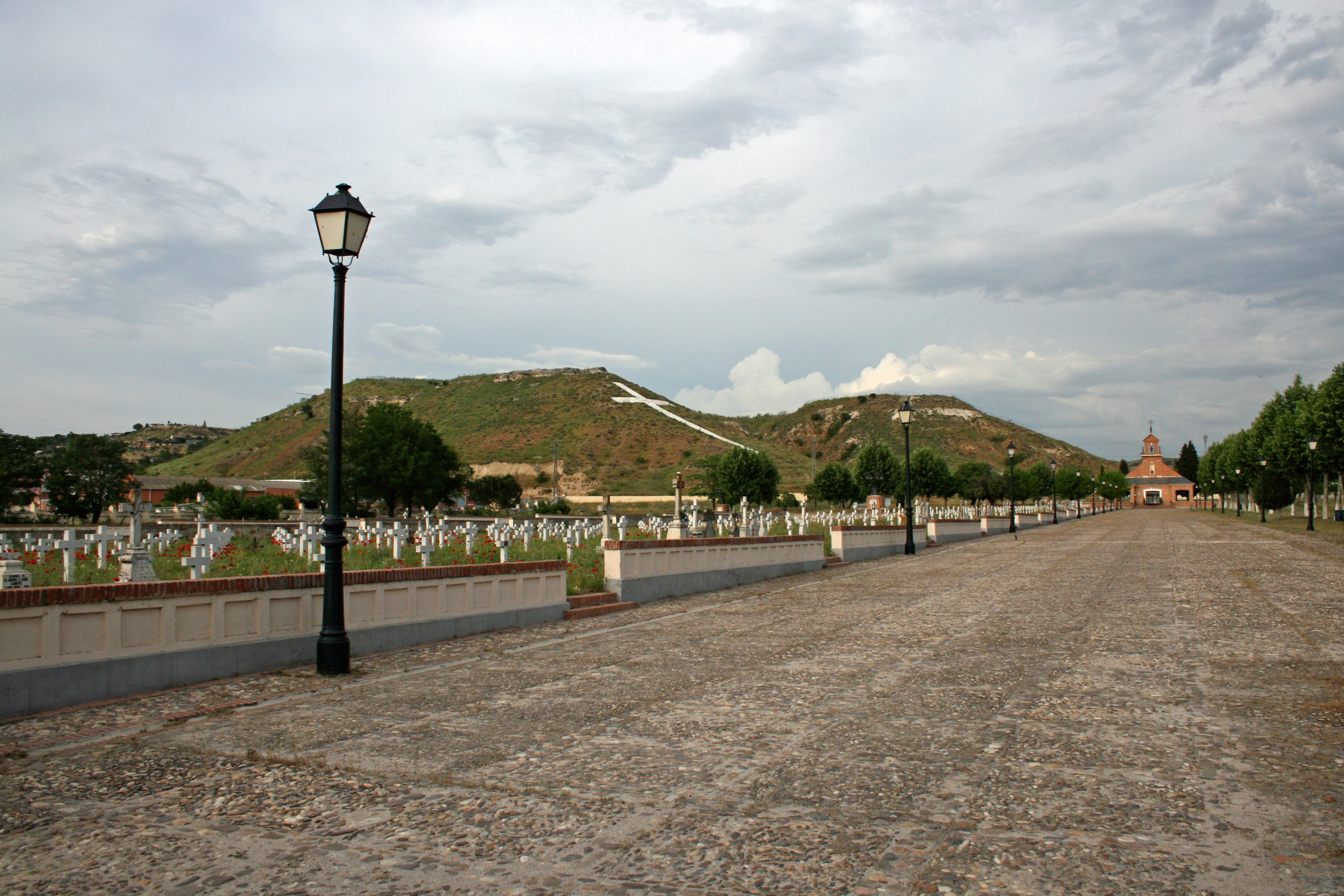
View of the Paracuellos Cemetery. In the background is the white cross drawn on the hill where the killings took place.

Republican Militia guards killed over a thousand prisoners in the "Massacre of Paracuellos", during the Battle of Madrid, in the area around San Jose, in the municipality of Paracuellos de Jarama and Soto Aldovea, within the boundary of Torrejón de Ardoz. They are commemorated by a large white cross on the slopes of the Cerro de San Miguel, near the river Jarama and visible from the airport of Madrid-Barajas.

=== Fortress at Toledo ===
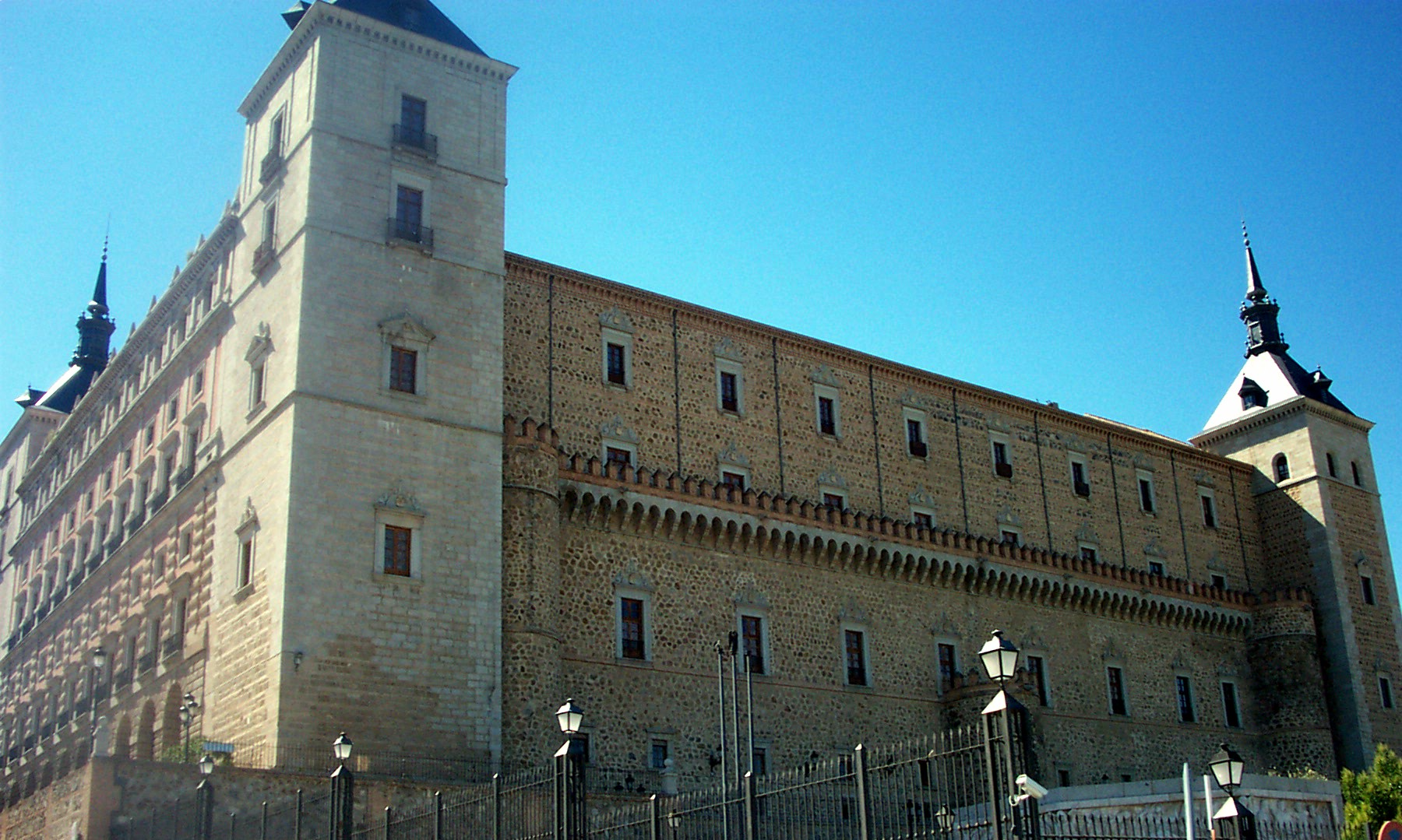
El Alcázar, Toledo, a fortress built out of rock, is located in the upper part of the city of Toledo and it overlooks the city.

In the third century, the Alcázar of Toledo was a Roman palace. It was restored during the reigns of Alfonso VI and Alfonso X and further modified in 1535. During the Civil War it was used by Colonel José Moscardó Ituarte as a fortress. During a siege there, which lasted 70 days (from 22 July to 28 September 28, 1936), it was completely destroyed by troops loyal to the Second Spanish Republic. It was later rebuilt. Since 1998 it has housed the Library of Castile-La Mancha, and from 2010 onwards it has also held the Army Museum. The siege and liberation were used by Francisco Franco to establish his dominance with his followers. A newspaper supporting extreme-right positions was named El Alcázar (1936-1988) after the building.

=== Monument to the Cruiser "Baleares" ===
The Monument to the Cruiser "Baleares" (El Monumento al Crucero "Baleares") is located in the San Feixina Park, Palma de Mallorca. It is controversial, with some groups calling for its removal. The monument was erected in memory of the crew of the heavy cruiser Baleares, which was torpedoed and sunk with heavy loss of life by destroyers of the Spanish Republican Navy in the Battle of Cape Palos in 1938. The monument was designed by the architects Don Francisco and Don José Roca Simó (a father and son duo) and the sculptor José Ortells Cabanellas. It was inaugurated on 16 May 1947. The column is 22 metres (72 ft) high, topped by a large cross. At one time it also included a sculpture of a sailor clinging to an anchor.

=== Pyramid of the Italians ===
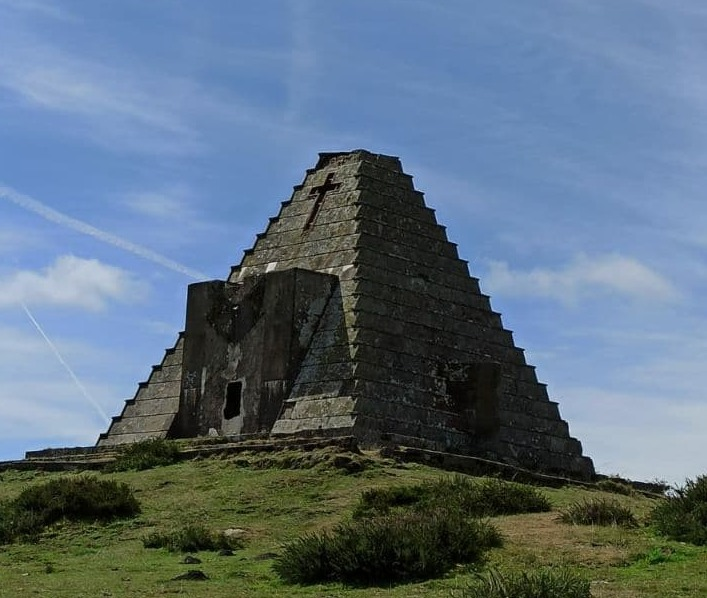
Pyramid of the Italians in Burgos

The "Pyramid of the Italians" is a 20 meters high mausoleum inaugurated on 26 August 1939 to house the corpses of the Italian soldiers who fell in the battle of Santander. It is located in the province of Burgos, a few meters from the border with Cantabria in the Puerto del Escudo.

The mausoleum was ordered to be built by Francisco Franco in 1937. The construction was directed by the Italian architect Pietro Giovanni Bergaminio. The remains of 384 Italian soldiers of the CTV (Corpo Truppe Volontarie) were buried inside. Count Galeazzo Ciano, Minister of Foreign Affairs of Italy between 1936 and 1943, supervised the burial of the soldiers together with Ramón Serrano Suñer. The mausoleum has been abandoned since 1975; it also suffers from deterioration and vandalism.

== Religious monuments ==
Franco was raised as a devout Catholic, and came to believe that Spanish nationalism and Catholic belief could not be separated. He felt that Spain had a special religious mission, and completely identified his cause with the cause of the church. Franco called his fight against the Republicans a "crusade" and presented his 1939 victory as a victory of Christian civilization. When attending churches, he entered solemnly under a religious canopy. On 15 April 1938, the Vinaròs beach was captured, splitting the Republican-held area into two. The head of the Navarre IV Division dipped his fingers in the water and made the sign of the cross, symbolically taking possession.

St. Teresa was designated by traditionalists and the Catholic Church as the "saint of the Spanish race". The Nationalist forces found the remnants of a sculpture of Saint Teresa in Málaga—one of her hands—which was sent to Franco. He made a personal cult of devotion to the saint, keeping the relic in his home until he died.

=== The Valley of the Fallen ===
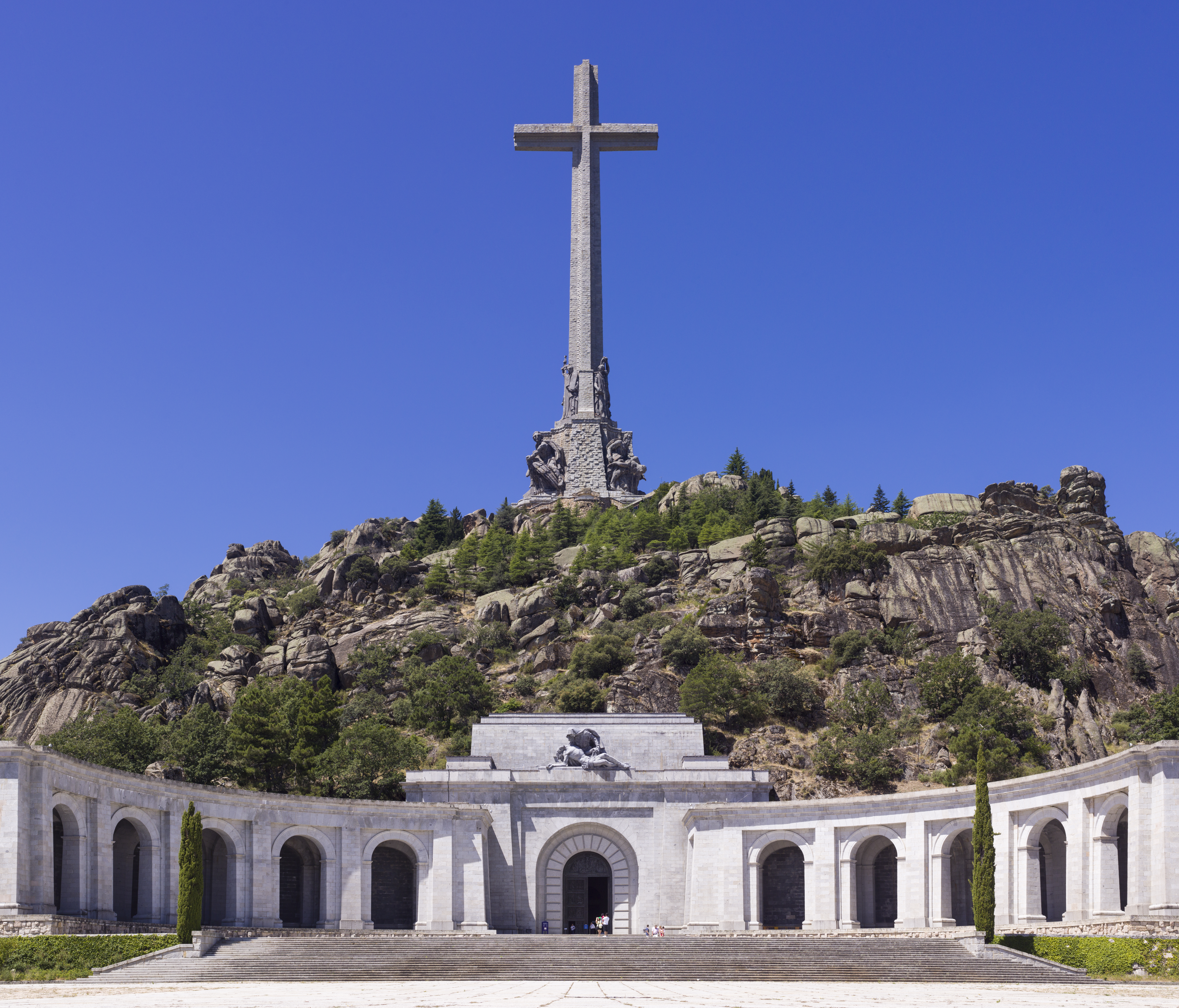
The Valley of the Fallen

This monument to the fallen in the Civil War was built by Republican prisoners of war. It is a large-scale monument, with the basilica built into the side of a pine-covered mountain and with an enormous stone cross above the entrance. The stone cross is 500 feet (150 m) high and is visible from a distance of 30 miles (48 km). The monument and basilica were built in accordance with the Decree of 1 April 1940 providing funds for construction of a basilica, monastery, and youth headquarters in a farm located on the slopes of the Sierra de Guadarrama (El Escorial), "to perpetuate the memory of the fallen of our glorious Crusade". Construction began in the 1940s and the structure was completed in 1959.

Franco's grave was located beside the altar. The monument continued to be visited by the dwindling group of his die-hard supporters on the anniversary of Franco's death in the post-Franco era. José Antonio Primo de Rivera and many other combatants from both sides in the Spanish Civil War are buried in the valley. Perhaps 50,000 of Franco's supporters are buried there, along with a handful of Republicans. Human rights groups have called for El Valle de los Caidos to be converted into a centre that would teach visitors about the Civil War and the Francoist State. Others have asked that the bodies of Jose Antonio and Franco be removed, and that plaques or other methods be used to give visitors some understanding of the historical background. In 2019, Franco's body was exhumed and his remains were re-buried in a family crypt near Madrid.

=== Sacred Heart of Jesus ===
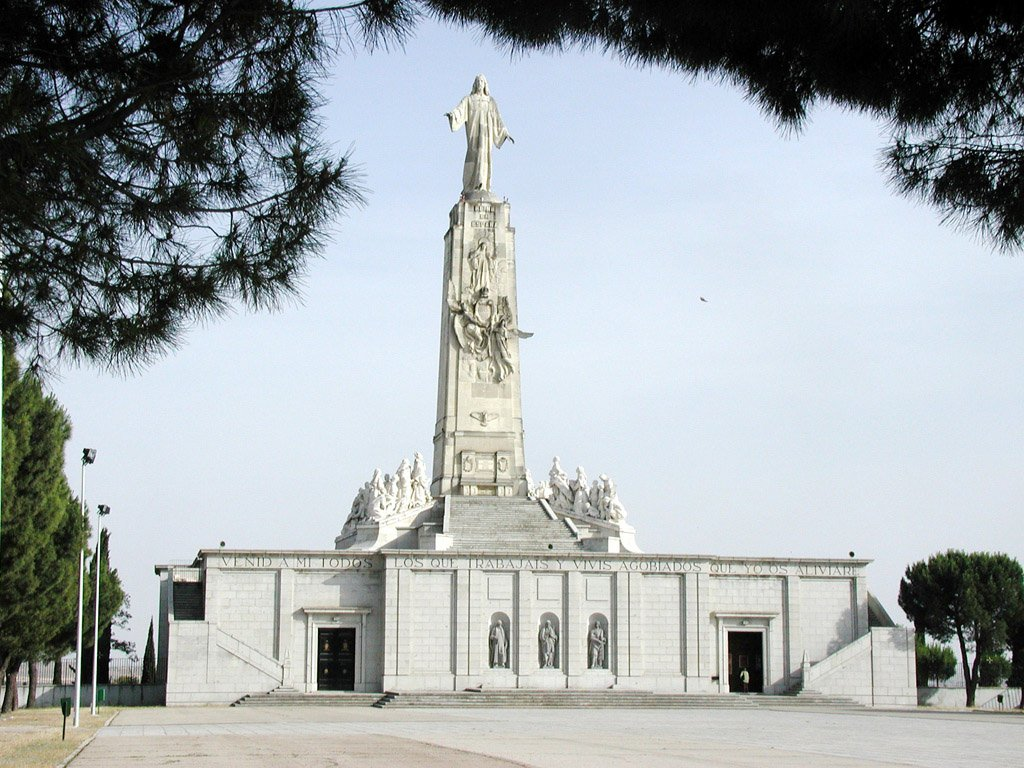
Sacred Heart of Jesus, monument in Cerro de los Ángeles, Getafe, Spain

The Cerro de los Ángeles (Hill of the Angels) is the site of the Monumento al Sagrado Corazón (Monument of the Sacred Heart). The original monument was created by architect Carlos Maura Nadal and sculptor Aniceto Marinas y García, and was inaugurated by King Alfonso XIII on 30 May 1919. It was destroyed on 7 August 1936 during the civil war. Republicans dynamited the monument due to its religious and political symbolism. There was a proposal to replace it with a figure representing Liberty or the Republic, but this was not executed.

The current monument is almost identical in design to the 1919 monument, but on a larger scale. Construction began in 1944 in accordance with designs by the architects Pedro Muguruza and Luis Quijada Martínez. The monument shows Christ with open arms, inviting all men to come to Him. The 11.5 metres (38 ft) high statue on a 26 metres (85 ft) pedestal is the work of Aniceto Marinas, and the group of sculptures around the base is by Fernando Cruz Solís. The monument was opened in 1965. The crypt, which did not exist in the original monument, was opened in 1975.

== Place names ==
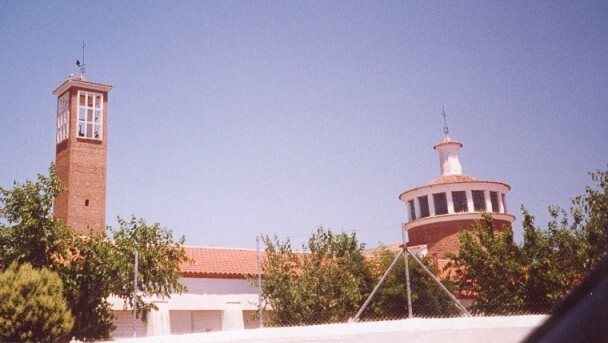
Alberche del Caudillo, now Calera y Chozas in the Province of Toledo

=== Towns and villages ===
Today, there are a number of towns that preserve the memory of Franco in their official names. The only one which has the status of a municipality is Llanos del Caudillo, with 726 inhabitants. Many other towns and cities that had similar names for decades, such as El Ferrol del Caudillo (until 1982, in the province of A Coruña), or Barbate de Franco (until 1998, in the province of Cádiz), withdrew references to Franco after the restoration of democracy. Franco wanted to honour generals from the Nationalist side by ascribing their names to various locations, and most still retain these names. Such is the case of San Leonardo de Yagüe, where General Juan Yagüe was born, or Alcocero de Mola, where General Emilio Mola died in a plane crash during the war. The case of Numancia de la Sagra (Toledo) is another example; since the Middle Ages, this town was known as Azaña, but during the Civil War this coincided with the first name of the then Spanish President, Manuel Azaña, so it was replaced in 1936. The original name, Azaña, means wheel (Arab-Moorish word). The town is now called "Numancia", after the regiment which captured it, and "Sagra" for the region it belongs to.

=== Street names ===
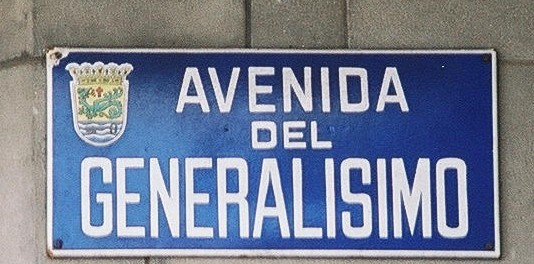
Nameplate for la Avenida del Generalísimo

The memory of Franco is still present in the names of the streets, squares and avenues of various towns and cities. There are also streets, avenues and squares in many cities and towns in Spain named for generals of the Civil War and the Nationalist party, such as Mola, Sanjurjo, Moscardó, Yagüe and Millán Astray. Other names from the Franco era were used, such as José Antonio Primo de Rivera, Ramiro Ledesma, Onésimo Redondo, José Calvo Sotelo, etc.

== Removal of symbols ==
In January 1980, the Madrid city council decided to rename twenty downtown streets, returning them to the names they had before 14 April 1931, when the Second Republic was created. The Avenida del Generalísimo thus became the Paseo de la Castellana. In 1981 the Avenida de José Antonio in Madrid was renamed La Gran Vía. Despite the withdrawal of some of the symbols during the first years of the Transition, some symbols remained more than thirty years after his death.

The Spanish Historical Memory Law, approved by the Congress of Deputies on 31 October 2007, mandated the removal of commemorative plaques, statues and other symbols from public buildings. It also opened the public archives covering the Franco period and facilitated the task of locating and exhuming the graves of victims. Under the 2007 law introduced by the socialist government of José Luis Rodríguez Zapatero, Falangist symbols had to be removed from public view, and streets and plazas that honoured Franco and his entourage had to be renamed. The law was criticized by both left-wing and right-wing observers, both for being too lenient or too severe. A historian said that by focusing on the abuses committed by Franco, the government was presenting the left-wing Republican government in too favourable a light, ignoring the many problems of the feuding socialist, anarchist, communist and separatist groups.

In 2010 the department of National Heritage stopped offering tours of Franco's private quarters in the Royal Palace of El Pardo, although tours of the older parts of the palace with "high artistic value" continued. In December 2010, the Valle de los Caídos was reopened, but with tight security systems to prevent vandalism or destruction by militant members of victims' associations. As of 2011, the government was considering exhuming Franco's body from the Valle de los Caídos and reburying it beside that of his wife in a municipal cemetery. There were some protests, but many supported the plan to transform the site into a place of reconciliation, with plaques to explain the past. Ramón Jáuregui, the responsible minister, said, "We have dealt with the past little by little. Maybe we're tackling this site a little late, but prudence has been the key to our peaceful transition." In October 2019, after the Democratic Memory Law was passed, Franco was exhumed and moved to a family plot near Madrid.

There was much debate regarding symbols that might affect the Church, so an exception was introduced for religious reasons, and an exception made for monuments with particular artistic value. There are some emblematic symbols such as the yoke and arrows on the Casa Sindical (a brick tower facing the Museo del Prado) and the Central Headquarters of the Movimiento, the Alcalá de Madrid which was built in a rationalist style.

== See also ==
- Cantos nacionales – Three Nationalist songs of the Spanish Civil War

== Sources ==
- Álvarez-Fernández, José Ignacio (2007). Memoria y Trauma en Los Testimonios de la Represión Franquista. Anthropos Editorial. ISBN 978-84-7658-810-9.
- Andrés, Jesús de (2006). Los símbolos y la memoria del franquismo (PDF). Fundación Alternativas. ISBN 84-96653-35-8.
- Ascunce, Aranzazu (2012-03-15). Barcelona and Madrid: Social Networks of the Avant-Garde. Lexington Books. ISBN 978-1-61148-425-0.
- Baskett, Simon (2003-02-01). The Rough Guide to Madrid. Rough Guides. ISBN 978-1-85828-891-8.
- Cardona, Gabriel (2012). "La República partida en dos". El Mundo.
- "Cinco siglos de yugo y flechas". Tiempo. 4 December 2006.
- "Constantino I, Cayo Flavio Valerio Aurelio Claudio (274-337)" (in Spanish).
- Conway, Martin; Romijn, Peter (2008-09-15). The War for Legitimacy in Politics and Culture, 1938-1948. Berg. ISBN 978-1-84520-481-5.
- Corpas Mauleón, Jesús Javier (2012-02-24). MIL AÑOS DE HISTORIAS DE GUERREROS. Bubok. p. 54. ISBN 978-84-686-0316-2.
- Cruz, Anne J; Suzuki, Mihoko (2009-06-22). The Rule of Women in Early Modern Europe. University of Illinois Press. ISBN 978-0-252-07616-9.
- "Defensa retira la estatua de Franco de la Academia de Zaragoza". El País (in Spanish). 14 August 2006.
- "Defensa retira "Los pies de Franco" y el "Mástil del Cañonero Dato"". El Pueblo. 12 February 2012.
- "El Ayuntamiento de Guadalajara también retira de madrugada las estatuas de Franco y Primo de Rivera". El Mundo. 28 March 2005.
- "El Fascio". Proyecto Filosofía en español. 16 March 1933.
- "El Fascio Index". El Fascio. 16 March 1933.
- "El Monumento al Sagrado Corazón". Cerro de los Ángeles.
- "El Yugo y Las Flechas de Polanco". sevilla.blogcinadario.com. 25 March 2007. Archived from the original on 5 December 2008.
- Encarnación, Omar G. (2008-07-15). Spanish Politics: Democracy after Dictatorship. Polity. ISBN 978-0-7456-3993-2.
- Esparza Leibar, Andoni (2006). "El Escusón (y algunas reflexiones sobre la España eterna)". Emblemata. 12: 231–274.
- Fernández, Luis Suárez; Porto, Carmen Manso; Celada, Abraham Rubio (2004). Isabel la Católica en la Real Academia de la Historia. Real Academia de la Historia. ISBN 978-84-95983-54-1.
- Fullana, Jeroni F.; Conolloy, Eduardo; Cota, Daniel (2000). El Crucero "Baleares" (PDF) (in Spanish). Lleonard Muntaner Editor, S.L. ISBN 84-95360-02-0.
- Gómez, Iñaki (24 August 2006). "Defensa retira la estatua de Franco de la Academia de Zaragoza". 20 minutos.
- González Iglesias, Juan Antonio (1994). "El humanista y los príncipes: Antonio de Nebrija, inventor de las empresas heráldicas de los Reyes Católicos". Antonio Nebrija, Edad Media y Renacimiento. Universidad de Salamanca, Salamanca. ISBN 84-7481-784-6.
- González Martínez, Carmen (1999). Guerra Civil en Murcia: Un Análisis Sobre el Poder y Los Comportamientos Colectivos. EDITUM. p. 182. ISBN 978-84-8371-096-8.
- Govan, Fiona (11 December 2010). "Franco's residence closed to public under Historical Memory law". The Telegraph.
- Greenberg, Douglas; Katz, Stanley N.; Wheatley, Steven C.; Oliviero, Melanie Beth (1993-07-08). Constitutionalism and Democracy: Transitions in the Contemporary World. Oxford University Press. ISBN 978-0-19-507107-8.
- "Haz y Yugo". El Fascio, Madrid. 16 March 1933.
- "Historia de la Bandera de España". Ministry of Defense of Spain.
- Horn, Gerd-Rainer (1996-11-21). European Socialists Respond to Fascism: Ideology, Activism and Contingency in the 1930s. Oxford University Press. ISBN 978-0-19-987994-6.
- Irasuegui, Iñigo Bolinaga (2010-01-01). Breve Historia del Fascismo. Ediciones Nowtilus S.L. ISBN 978-84-9763-453-3.
- Irigoyen de la Rasilla, María Julia (2001). Patrimonio Artístico de la Universidad Complutense de Madrid. Editorial Complutense. p. 41. ISBN 978-84-89784-73-4.
- "IU quiere ver fundida la estatua de Franco de Ferrol". Público. 2009-09-03.
- Jelen, Ted Gerard; Wilcox, Clyde (2002-04-01). Religion and Politics in Comparative Perspective: The One, The Few, and The Many. Cambridge University Press. ISBN 978-0-521-65971-0.
- "Juan Aparicio López 1906-1996". Proyecto Filosofía en español (in Spanish). www.filosofia.org.
- Jurkevich, Gayana (1999). In Pursuit of the Natural Sign: Azorín and the Poetics of Ekphrasis. Bucknell University Press. p. 162. ISBN 978-0-8387-5413-9.
- Kallis, A. (2002-12-23). Fascism Reader. Taylor & Francis. ISBN 978-0-415-24359-9.
- Kingstone, Steve (20 November 2007). "Franco bill divides Spaniards". BBC News.
- "La Academia de Infanteria retirará la estatua de Franco si se ordena". ABC. 2008-09-11.
- Lafuente, Ismael Fuente (26 January 1980). "Generalísimo se convierte en paseo de la Castellana". El Pais.
- "La Gran Vía, Madrid". Go Madrid.
- "La última estatua ecuestre de Franco, a un almacén". El Mundo. 2010-03-18.
- Leitz, Christian (2000). Nazi Germany and Neutral Europe During the Second World War. Manchester University Press. p. 118. ISBN 978-0-7190-5069-5.
- "Los comienzos del Valle de los Caidos". Generalísimo Francisco Franco.
- Luengo, Juan José Antequera (2012). Actualidad de la heráldica. Inercia y auge de la simbología municipal andaluza. facediciones.es. ISBN 978-84-9986-159-3.
- Macclancy, Jeremy (2000-09-01). The Decline Of Carlism. University of Nevada Press. ISBN 978-0-87417-344-4.
- Marcuello, Pedro (1987). José Manuel Blecua (ed.). Cancionero de Pedro Marcuello. Verses 6-8 of volume 7 and 35-39 of volume 2. Zaragoza.
- Menéndez Pidal, Faustino (2004). El escudo de España. Madrid: Real Academia Matritense de Heráldica y Genealogía. ISBN 84-88833-02-4.
- "Monumento Antiguo". Cerro de los Ángeles.
- Morales, Juan; Alegría, José Carlos (31 March 2001). "Standard of the Head of State 1940-1975 (Spain)". Flags of the World.
- Ofer, Inbal (2010-07-01). Señoritas in Blue: The Making of a Female Political Elite in Franco's Spain: The National Leadership of the Sección Femenina de La Falange. Sussex Academic Press. ISBN 978-1-84519-411-6.
- Oliver, Maria Antònia (16 October 2009). "El Crucero Baleares". Coordinadora de Colectivos de Victimas del Franquismo.
- Ollés, Albert (28 April 2008). "Franco deja tras 45 años el fortín de Montjuïc con destino al almacén". El Periódico.
- Olmeda, Fernando (2010-01-18). El Valle de los Caídos: Una memoria de España. Ediciones Península. ISBN 978-84-8307-923-2.
- "Origen de la camisa azul". Historia Falange. Archived from the original on 2009-09-21.
- Parkins, Wendy (2002-05-01). Fashioning the Body Politic: Dress, Gender, Citizenship. Berg. ISBN 978-1-85973-587-9.
- Payne, Stanley G. (2000-01-10). Fascism in Spain, 1923-1977. Univ of Wisconsin Press. p. 69. ISBN 978-0-299-16564-2.
- Payne, Stanley G. (2011-09-27). The Franco Regime, 1936-1975. University of Wisconsin Pres. ISBN 978-0-299-11074-1.
- Peña López, Juan Manuel; Alonso González, José Luis (2004). La Guerra Civil y sus banderas 1936-1939. Madrid: Aldaba Ed. ISBN 84-95088-72-X.
- Pérez-Romero, Antonio (1996). Subversion and Liberation in the Writings of St. Teresa of Avila. Rodopi. p. 68. ISBN 978-90-420-0062-9.
- "Plano del Camposanto de Paracuellos de Jarama". Nuestra Señora de los Mártires de Paracuellos del Jarama.
- Preston, Paul (1996-01-01). Franco: A Biography. Basic Books. ISBN 978-0-465-02516-9.
- Rainsford, Sarah (18 July 2011). "Fate of Franco's Valley of Fallen reopens Spain wounds". BBC News.
- Ramet, Sabrina P.; Ingebritsen, Christine (2002). Coming in from the Cold War: Changes in U.S.-European Interactions Since 1980. Rowman & Littlefield. ISBN 978-0-7425-0017-4.
- Ramos, Ramiro Ledesma (1988). F̂ascismo en España?: La patria libre : nuestra revolucion (in Spanish). Herederos de Ramiro Ledesma Ramos. ISBN 9788440425218.
- "Retiran la estatua ecuestre de Franco en Madrid". 20 minutos (in Spanish). 18 March 2005.
- "Retiran de Melilla la última estatua ecuestre de Franco expuesta en España". El Mundo. 4 August 2010.
- Ryan, Chris (2012-05-23). Battlefield Tourism. Routledge. ISBN 978-0-08-045362-0.
- "Sala de Exposiciones Municipal Conde Rodezno". Ayuntamiento de Pamplona.
- Salinas, Daniel (18 December 2008). "Santander retira la última estatua de Franco". ABC.es (in Spanish).
- Sánchez, Antonio (2007). Postmodern Spain: A Cultural Analysis of 1980s-1990s Spanish Culture. Peter Lang. ISBN 978-3-03910-914-2.
- Sandler, Stanley (2002-09-01). Ground Warfare: An International Encyclopedia. ABC-CLIO. p. 828. ISBN 978-1-57607-344-5.
- Simonis, Damien (2007-03-01). Spain. Lonely Planet. ISBN 978-1-74104-554-3.
- Soler, Martínez (13 November 2005). "Franco, bajo palio. !Qué foto tan oportuna!". 20 minutos (in Spanish).
- Teichova, Alice; Matis, Herbert (2003-05-08). Nation, State and the Economy in History. Cambridge University Press. ISBN 978-0-521-79278-3.
- "The coat of arms". Complejo de la Moncloa. Government of Spain.
- Tremlett, Giles (3 November 2007). "After Franco, the forgetting". The Guardian.
- "V Centenario Isabel I de Castilla. Referente a la historia. Símbolos de su reinado. Legado de la Historia" (in Spanish). Fabrica Nacional de Moneda y Timbre. Archived from the original on 18 December 2008.
- "Victory arch". Madrid Tourist.
- Villena Garcia, Miguel Angel (April 2010). Ciudadano Azaña: Biografía del símbolo de la II República (in Spanish). Ediciones Península. p. 277. ISBN 978-84-9942-006-6.
- Ward, Alistair (2004-09-01). Espana Britannia: A Bitter-Sweet Relationship. Shepheard-Walwyn (Publishers) Ltd. ISBN 978-0-85683-224-6.
- Wells, Mike (2011-05-19). History for the IB Diploma: Causes, Practices and Effects of Wars. Cambridge University Press. ISBN 978-0-521-18931-6.
- Wright, Richard (2008-02-05). Pagan Spain. HarperCollins. p. 66. ISBN 978-0-06-145019-8.
- Zuloaga, Ignacio (1940). "Portrait of Franco". Archived from the original on 2016-09-11.
