= First Francoism =

First stage of Francisco Franco's dictatorship (1939–1959)

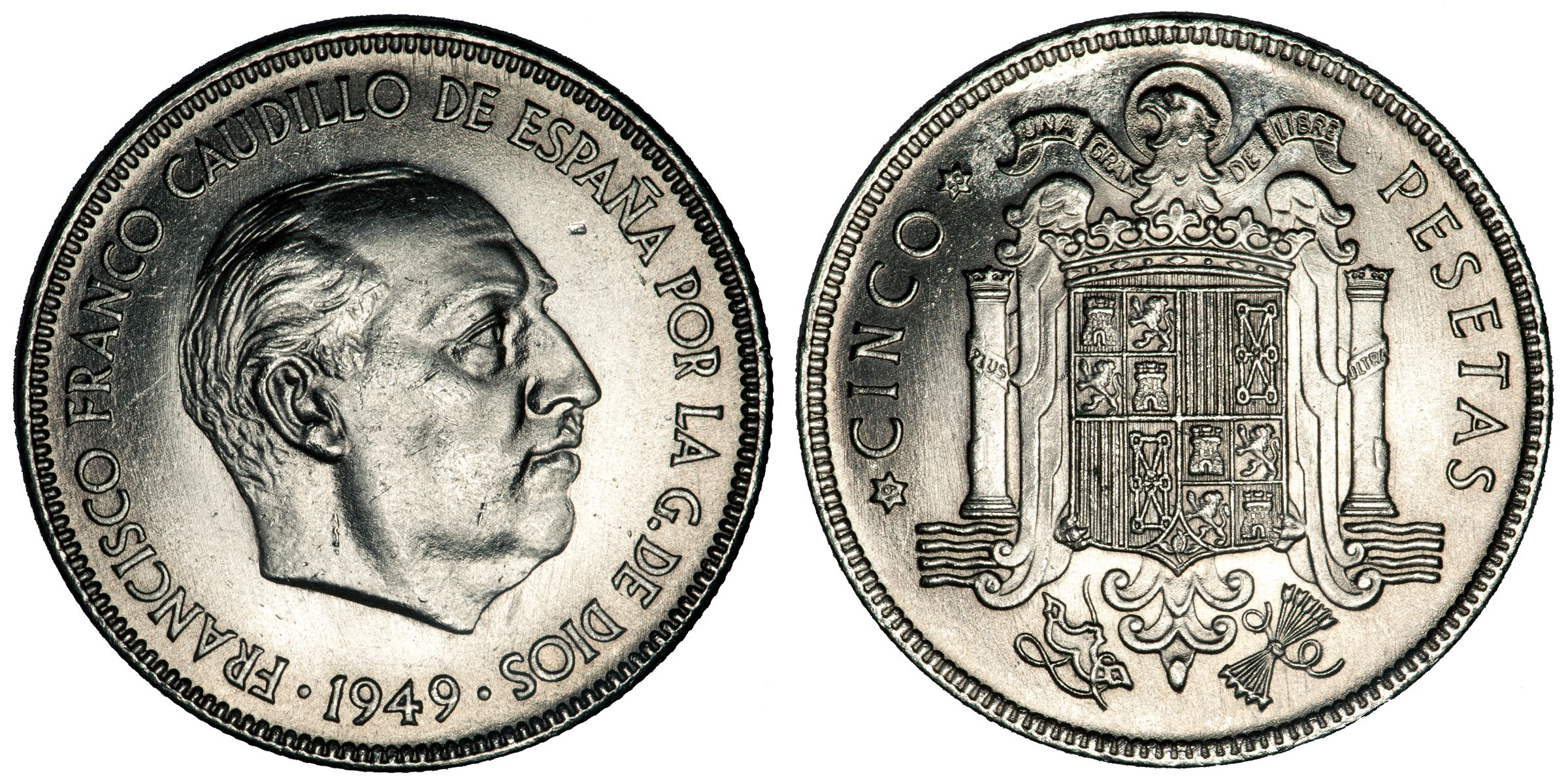
Coin of 5 pesetas minted in 1949. On the obverse is the effigy of General Franco with the inscription Francisco Franco Caudillo de España por la G. [Gracia] de Dios (Francisco Franco Caudillo of Spain by the G. [Grace] of God). On the reverse is the new coat of arms of Spain.

The first Francoism (1939–1959) was the first stage in the history of General Francisco Franco's dictatorship, between the end of the Spanish Civil War and the abandonment of the autarkic economic policy with the application of the Stabilization Plan of 1959, which gave way to the developmentalist Francoism or Second Francoism, which lasted until the death of the Generalissimo. This phase is characterized by scholars as the totalitarian or quasi-totalitarian and the fascist or quasi-fascist phase of the dictatorship. It is usually divided into three sub-stages: the first from 1939 to 1945, which corresponds to the Second World War and during which the Franco regime underwent a process of fascistization already begun during the civil war to resemble Nazi Germany and, above all, Fascist Italy, and which was aborted by the defeat of the Axis powers; the second sub-stage, from 1945 to 1950, was the most critical period in the history of the Franco dictatorship because of the international isolation and the opposition's offensive, but the "cosmetic" changes it introduced and above all the outbreak of the Cold War ended up reintegrating it into the anti-communist Western Bloc; the third stage, from 1951 to 1959, has also been called the hinge decade (in Spanish: decenio bisagra) for being an intermediate period between the stagnation of the "autarkic" 1940s and the "developmentalist" 1960s, and has also been characterized as the period of the "splendor of national Catholicism".

== Franco's repression in the post-war period ==
=== Repressive laws and number of victims ===
At the end of the civil war there were 100,292 people in prisons, eight times the number in 1934, although this figure does not include the 400,000 or so soldiers of the Republican army who had been taken prisoner in the last weeks of the war. By the end of 1939 the figure had almost tripled to 270,719. Most of them served as free labor for the regime. In the following years the prison population decreased until it reached 54,072 at the end of 1944, although still far from the figures of the years before the civil war.

A decree issued by General Franco on June 9, 1939, established the reduction of prison years in exchange for work on certain projects. Thus were born in September the militarized penitentiary colonies, the most important of which was the one organized for the construction of the Valley of the Fallen, decreed on April 1, 1940, the first anniversary of Franco's victory in the civil war.

In the postwar period, military tribunals continued to be the main instrument of repression, since the state of war proclaimed by the National Defense Junta on July 28, 1936, was maintained until long after the end of the civil war (it was lifted on April 7, 1948). According to Stanley G. Payne, "the total number of political executions during the first six postwar years, 1939–1945, was at least 28,000", with the "bloodiest years" being 1939 and 1940. Borja de Riquer increases the figure to 45,000–50,000 executed in the entire postwar period.

To justify the repression, as soon as the war was over, the Report of the Commission on the illegitimacy of the powers acting on July 18, 1936 was made public, which had been commissioned by General Franco to twenty-two jurists in order to guarantee "that the July 18 Uprising had not been an uprising to change a political regime in force, but an action aimed at re-establishing the legitimacy that had been destroyed". The first argument he used was that the result of the Spanish general elections of 1936 had been falsified "in order to arbitrarily increase the seats of the left at the expense of the right".

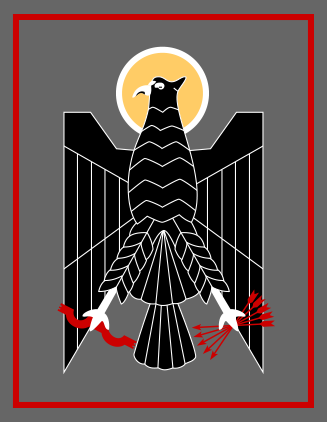
Coat of arms of the Armed Police, created in 1941.

The military jurisdiction was complemented by a special civil jurisdiction —courts were established in the most important regions and a National Court in Madrid— which would deal with the cases established in the Law of Political Responsibilities promulgated by General Franco on February 9, 1939, two months before the end of the war. The law automatically condemned all members of the Republican and left-wing parties who had supported the cause of the Republic, as well as all those who had supported the Republican side and even those who had shown "serious passivity" with respect to the Nationalist side. Membership in Freemasonry also meant immediate condemnation. The penalties established in the law ranged from six months to fifteen years in prison, along with penalties of restriction on professional activities, limitation of residence, banishment to the African colonies or house arrest. These penalties were complemented by economic sanctions ranging from fines to confiscation of property.

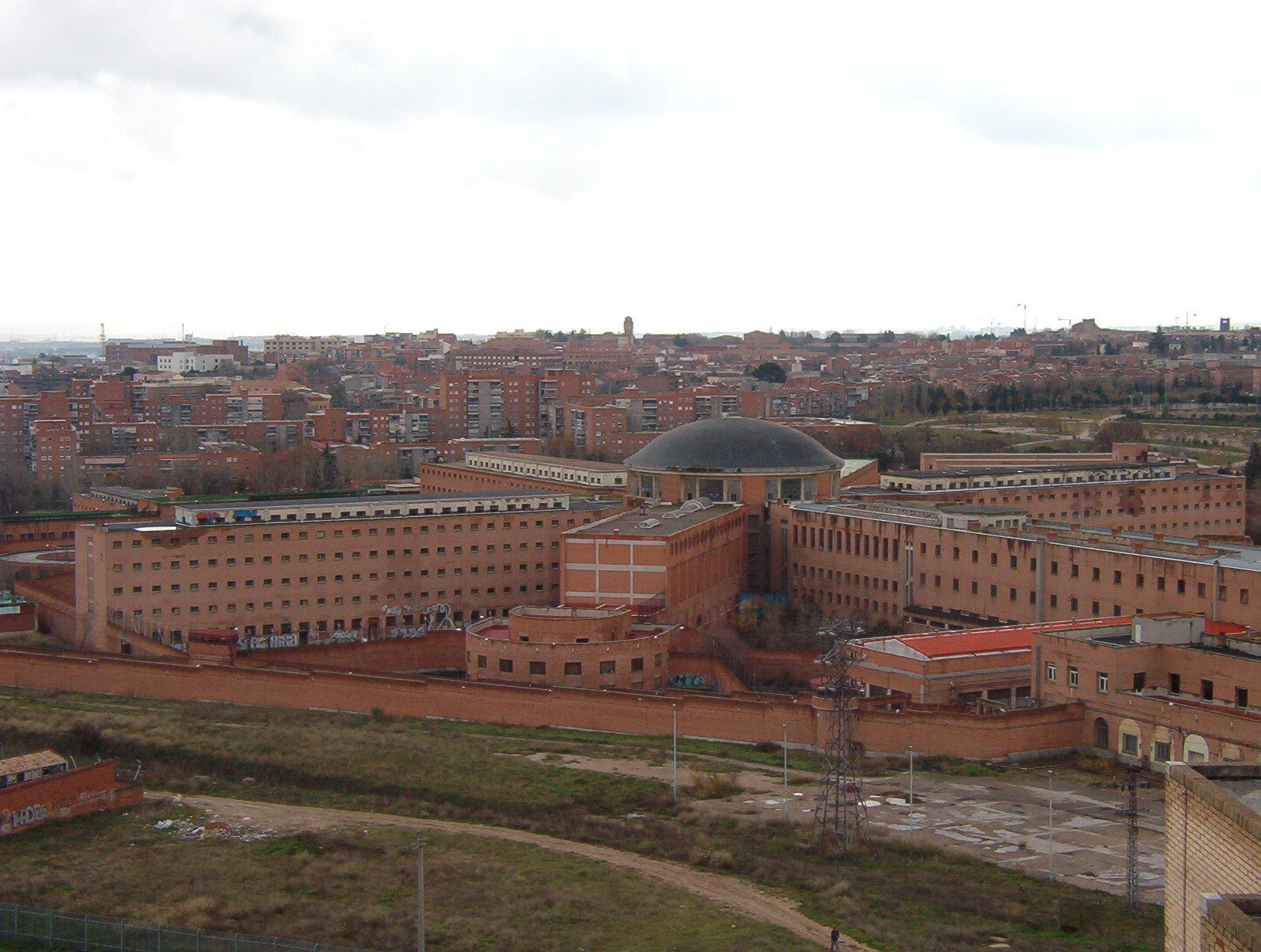
Carabanchel Prison (Madrid).

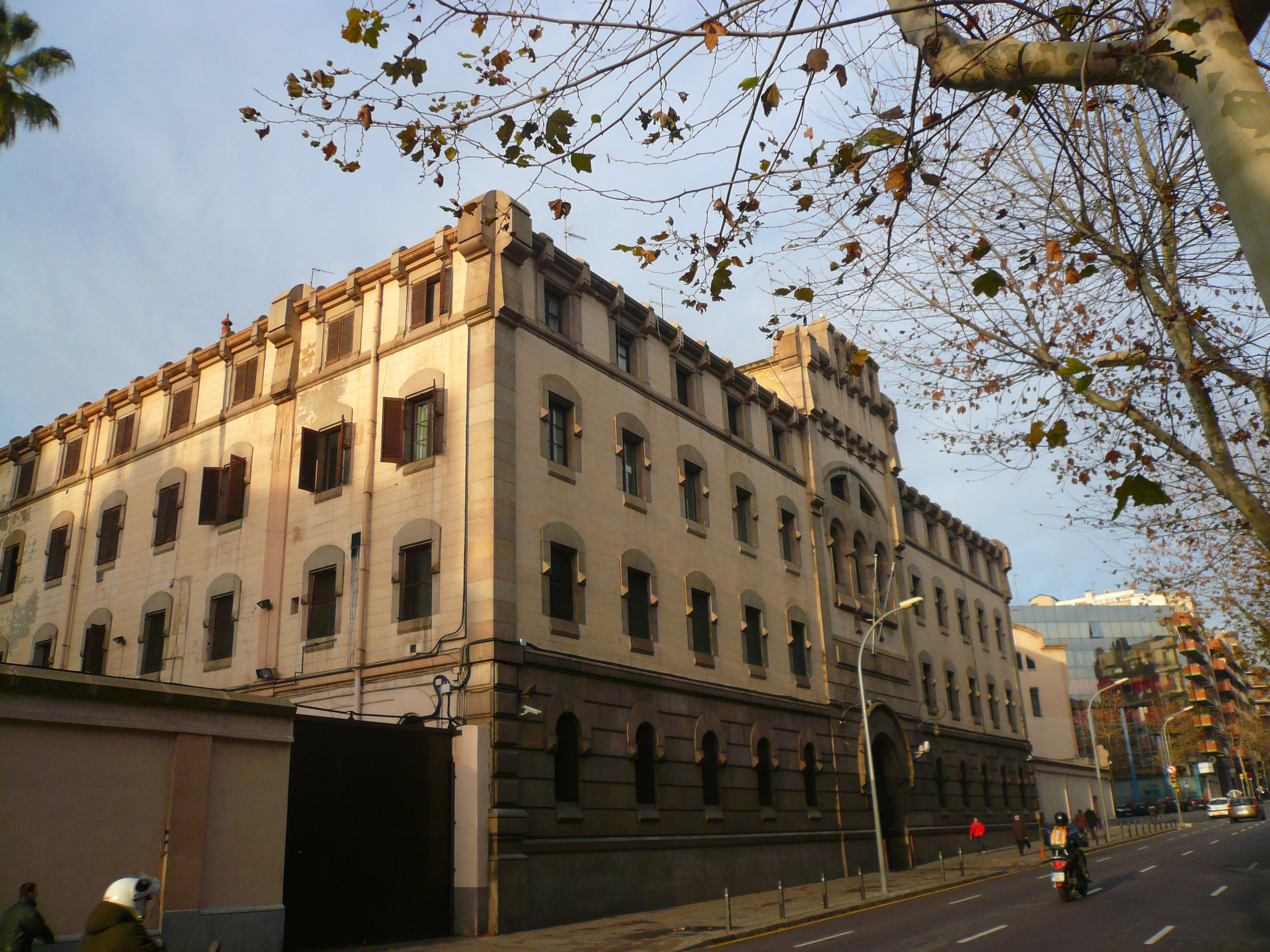
Barcelona Model Prison.

The Law of Political Responsibilities was completed with the Law for the Repression of Freemasonry and Communism, so called because Freemasonry (a personal obsession of General Franco) was considered the instigator of the "subversion" that Spain had suffered and "communism" (a term that encompassed workers' organizations and parties of all tendencies) as the main enemy of Spain. "The first article of the law is sufficiently illustrative of the extraordinary punitive scope that was granted to its application" since "practically any heterodox conduct could fall within the scope of a repressive policy":

It constitutes a figure of crime, punishable in accordance with the provisions of the present Law, to belong to Freemasonry, Communism and the other clandestine associations referred to in the following articles. The Government may add to said organizations such auxiliary branches or nuclei as it deems necessary and then apply to them the same provisions of this Law, duly accepted.

The law was promulgated on March 1, 1940. In it "Freemasonry was directly accused of the loss of the American kingdoms, of the civil wars of the 19th century, of the fall of the Monarchy and of collaboration with communism for the establishment in Spain of the Soviet dictatorship". In addition, by virtue of the law "many Masons who were on probation, for lack of evidence of political activities, were again imprisoned, tried and sentenced". The persecution against Freemasonry had begun as soon as the war began, and at the end of the war the special anti-Masonic Information Service was created, whose agents for many years delivered reports and secret documents to General Franco.

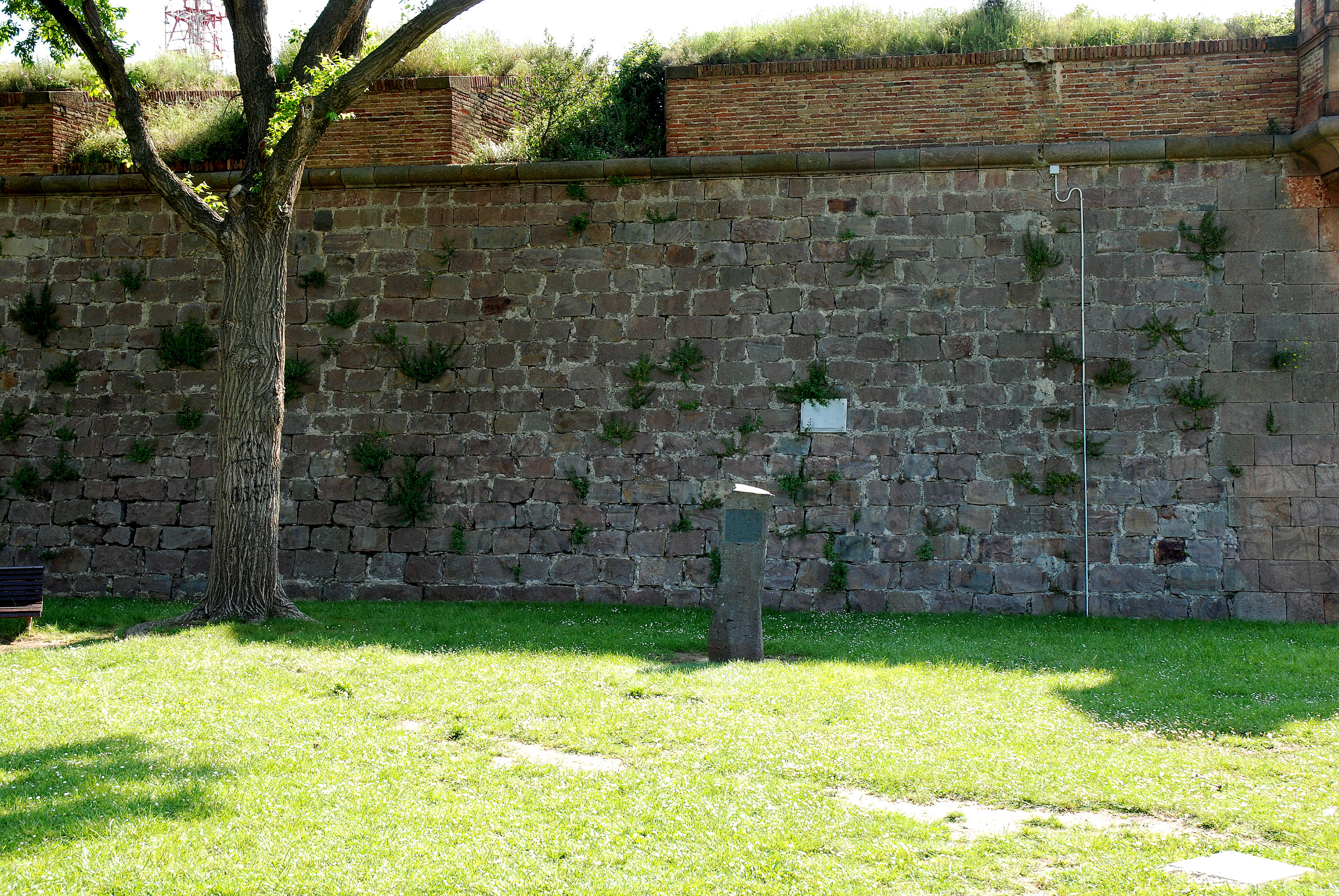
Wall of the castle of Montjuïc where President Companys was shot on October 15, 1940.

Stanley Payne denies that the post-war repression constituted a program of "mass liquidation", although he recognizes that although "the cases were decided on an individual basis", "a general criterion was applied to them in terms of the level of responsibility in Republican political parties and trade union movements".

During his visit to Spain in October 1940, SS Chief Himmler was disconcerted by the magnitude of the repression that was still going on in Spain a year and a half after the end of the civil war. His visit coincided with the summary court martial against prominent Republican leaders, refugees in France, who had been handed over to Franco by the Gestapo (Julián Zugazagoitia, Francisco Cruz Salido, Teodomiro Menéndez, Cipriano Rivas Cherif, Carlos Montilla Escudero and Miguel Salvador; all except one, Menéndez, were condemned to death. A week earlier Lluís Companys had been condemned and executed and on November 9 it was the turn of Julián Zugazagoitia).

=== Exaltation of the victors and policy toward the vanquished ===
Franco did not make any attempt at reconciliation with the defeated. "Never, in any way and under any circumstances, did Franco have the slightest doubt of the legitimacy of his victory: when he spoke of reconciliation, he always did so under the assumption that, abandoning resentments, all Spaniards could participate in the effects of that same victory". "The new Spanish State was a rigorous and punitive dictatorship, determined to carry out a political and cultural counterrevolution, to annul any sign of opposition and to establish a firm domination of the victorious side."

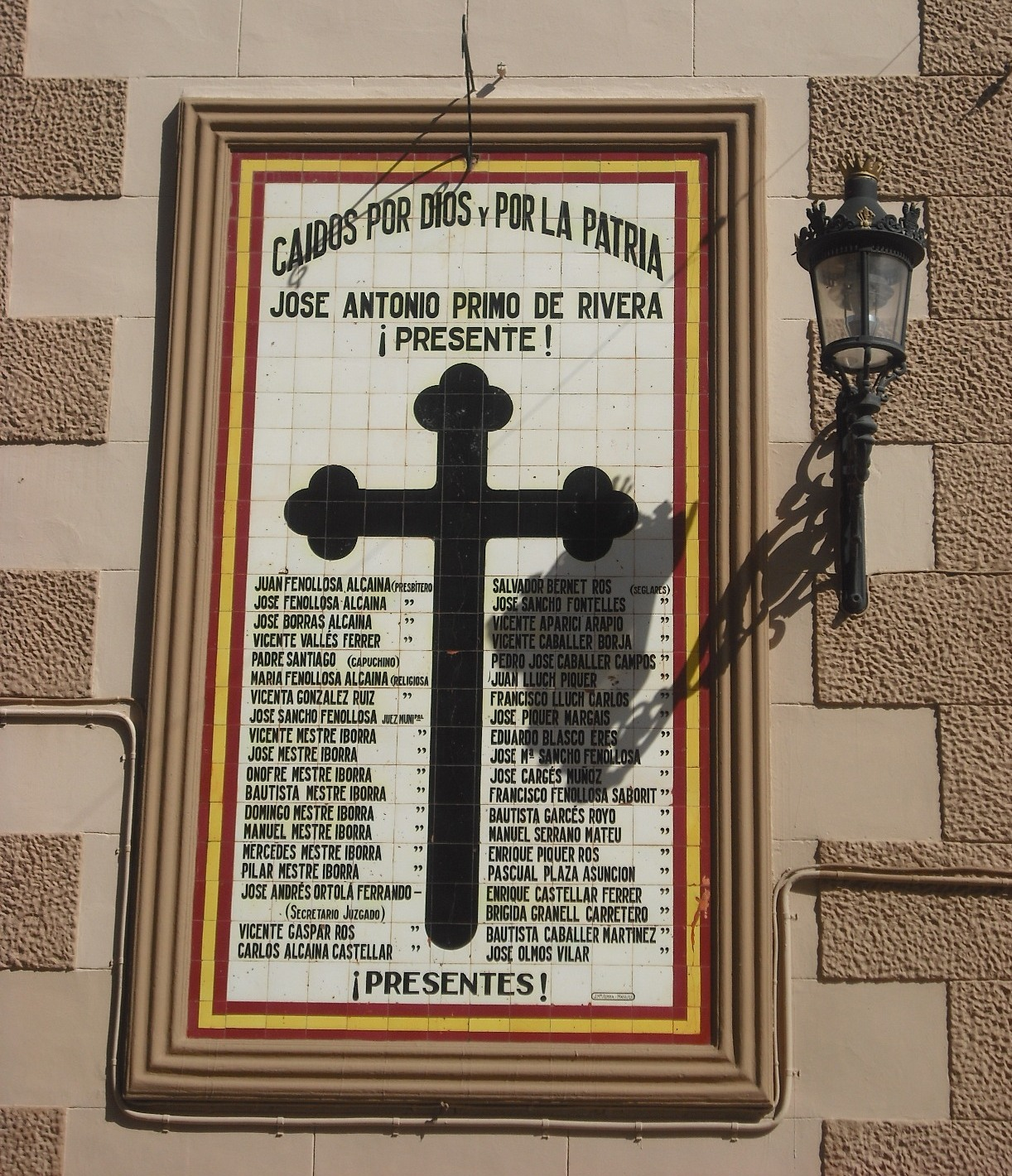
Commemorative plaque of the "Caídos por Dios y por la Patria" (Fallen for God and for the Fatherland), Church of San Antonio (Rafelbunyol, province of Valencia).

In an interview granted to journalist Manuel Aznar and published in the Diario Vasco on January 1, 1939, when the offensive in Catalonia had just begun, General Franco explained that the civil war had created "an excessively high number of crimes, which have to be purged so that those who committed them can be reintegrated into society. But not amnesty: " stubborn criminals" must not return. Repentance is the indispensable condition" and announced the establishment of means that would allow the rapid redemption of the condemned. This same idea that there would be no reconciliation with the defeated (because it would be "suicide") was repeated again on December 31, 1939, in his first radio message at the end of the year (a custom he would maintain throughout his dictatorship).

The pastoral of Cardinal Primate Isidro Gomá "Lessons of the war and duties of peace" published on August 8 in the bulletin of the archdiocese of Toledo was forbidden to be broadcast in the rest of the Church media and by the press because, among other reasons, it suggested the forgiveness of the defeated, which outraged Franco, who was determined to maintain "a spirit of combative triumphalism".

At the same time that reconciliation with the defeated was denied, the victors were exalted. On April 3, 1939, only two days after the end of the civil war with the broadcast of the Last report of the Spanish Civil War, Radio Nacional de España broadcast a message from General Franco with the title "Commemoration of the Fallen" (which would also be known as the speech of the Three Alerts):

Spaniards, alert. Peace is not a comfortable and cowardly rest in the face of History; the blood of those who fell does not consent to oblivion, sterility or betrayal.

Spaniards, alert. All the old partisan or sectarian banditries have ended forever; the righteousness of justice will never bend before privileged selfishness nor before criminal rebellion; love and the sword will maintain, with the victorious unity of command, the eternal Spanish unity.

Spaniards, be alert. Spain remains at war against any enemy from the interior or the exterior, perpetually faithful to its fallen, with God's favor, continues on the march, One, Great and Free, towards its unrenounceable destiny.

At the beginning of 1941, the fascist Ernesto Giménez Caballero, one of the most prominent members of Franco's propaganda apparatus, made the following assessment of the victory in the civil war:

For ten years, since the end of Primo de Rivera's government, the Spaniard had been demanding a single gift from heaven: Peace. Peace without shooting in the streets. Without blasphemies. Without angry faces. No excited masses. No assaulted banks. No workers' blood in the gutter. No insulted uniforms and cassocks. And that... has come. It has arrived in this year of 1941 —blessed— that is beginning.

A decree of August 25, 1939 reserved 80 percent of the posts in the Administration —which experienced a rapid growth— for "combatants" of the "national side" and for civilians who had made special sacrifices for the "national" cause or had suffered the "red terror", as well as their relatives. In this way, "people with little training were incorporated, which resulted in high levels of incompetence and, perhaps, fostered the corruption that invaded the administration during the first year of peace".

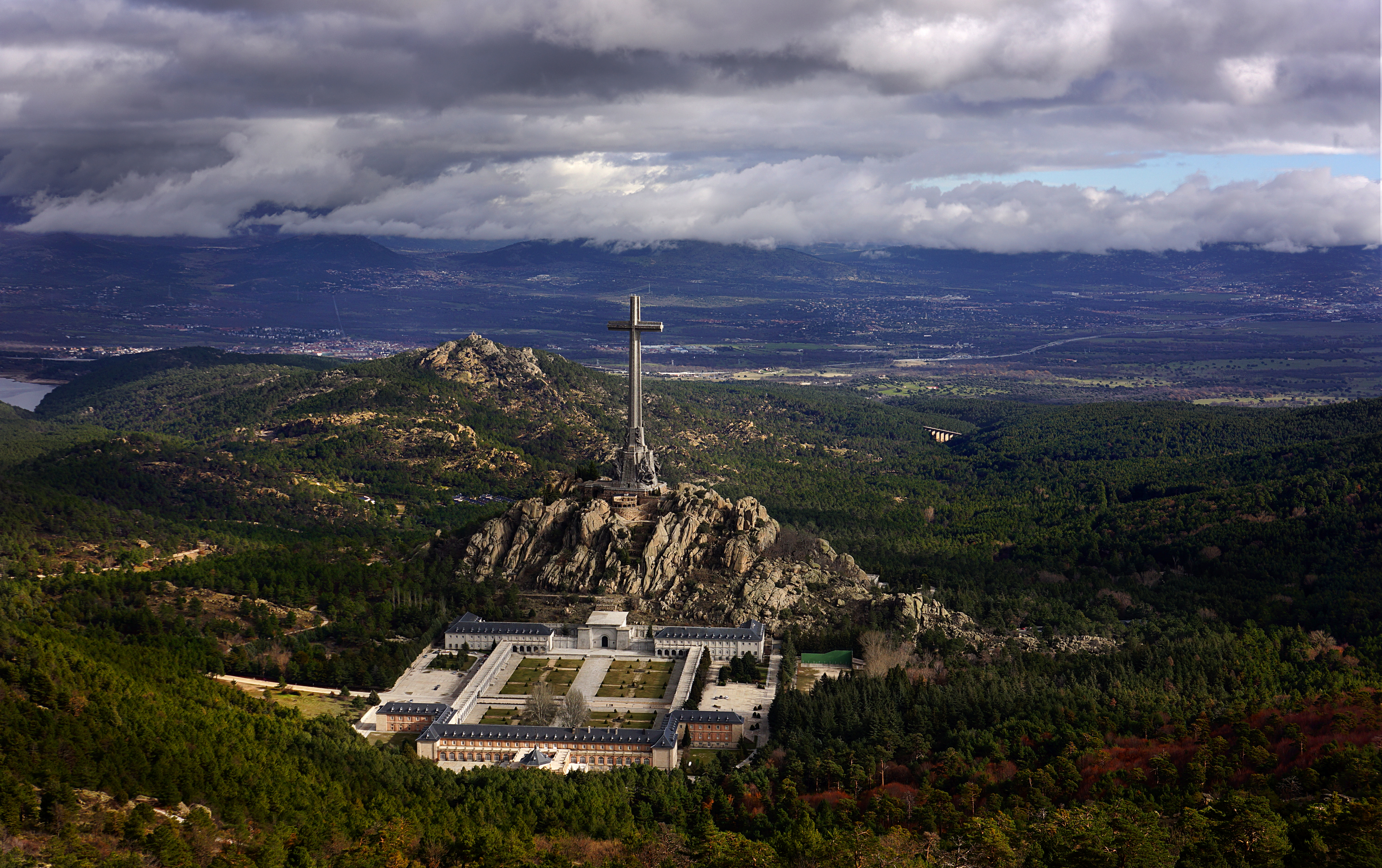
Valley of the Fallen.

On October 21, four days after settling in the Palace of El Pardo, General Franco announced his great project of what would be known as the Valley of the Fallen. In the middle of the Sierra de Guadarrama a huge cross 200 meters high was to be built, so that it would be visible to all travelers. On April 1, 1940, the first anniversary of the victory in the war, the decree was issued to erect this monument to the fallen of the national side. It was read by Colonel Valentín Galarza, undersecretary of the presidency of the government, in the same place where it was to be built before the members of the government, heads of the Falange, generals and the diplomatic corps who had gone there led by General Franco after the Victory parade. In the preamble it was said:

The dimension of our Crusade, the heroic sacrifices that the victory encloses and the transcendence that this epic has had for the future of Spain, cannot be perpetuated by the simple monuments with which the salient facts of our history and the glorious episodes of its sons are usually commemorated in towns and cities. It is necessary that the stones that are raised have the grandeur of the ancient monuments, that they defy time and oblivion...

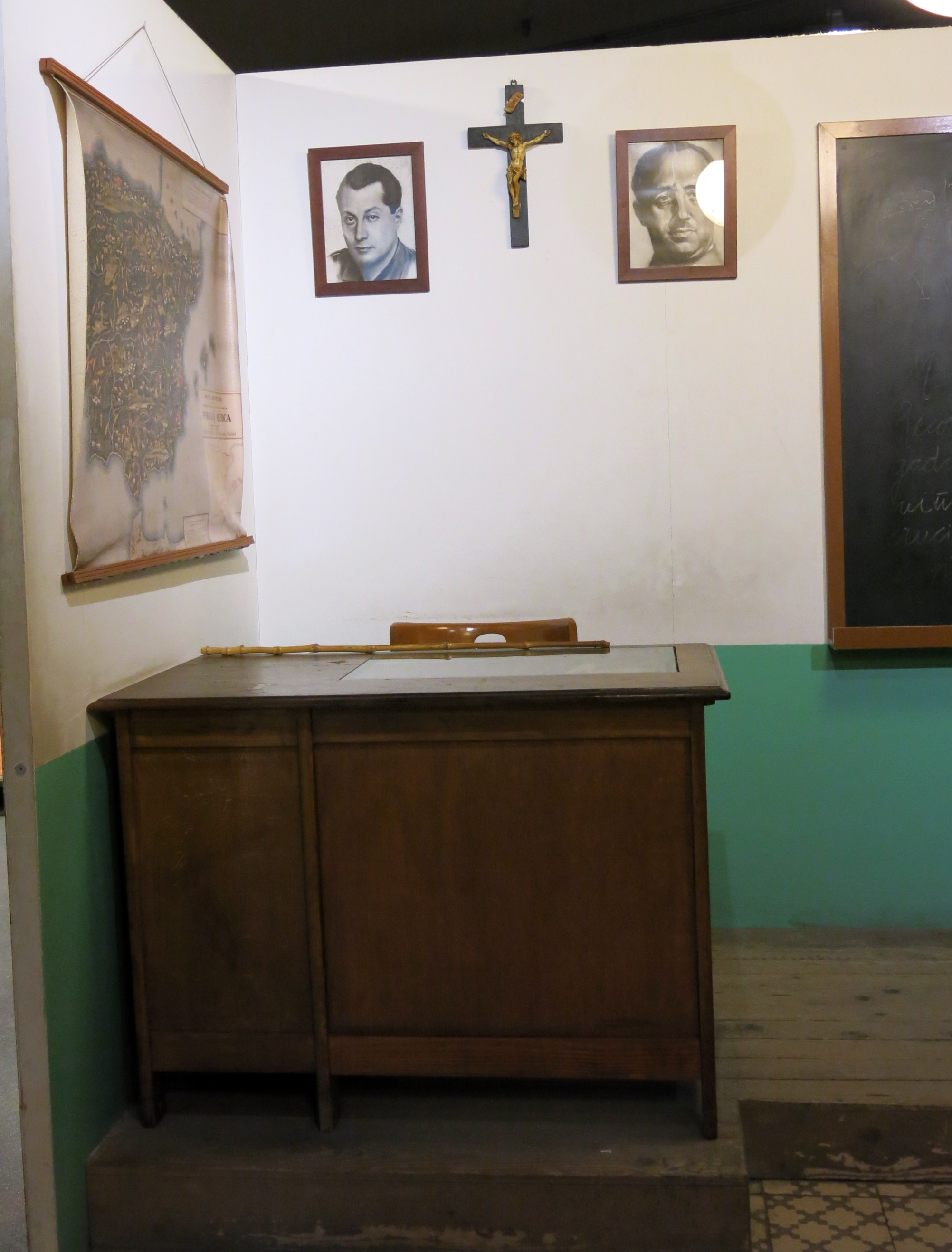
Typical classroom of a school during Franco's regime, presided by a crucifix and the portraits of Franco (on the right) and José Antonio Primo de Rivera (on the left). Museum of the History of Catalonia.

The work was entrusted to the architect Pedro Muguruza, based on an idea of General Franco himself, who wanted to link his time with that of the Catholic Monarchs, Charles V and Philip II. "At the beginning it was foreseen that the work would last twelve months. In the long run, it would take two decades and would become, after hunting, Franco's greatest private obsession". Twenty thousand Republican prisoners were employed in its construction.

On November 20, 1939, the third anniversary of the execution of José Antonio Primo de Rivera, the remains of the founder of Falange Española, José Antonio Primo de Rivera, were transferred on foot from Alicante to the monastery of El Escorial, 500 kilometers away. "On foot, night and day, with good or bad weather, between November 20 and 30, 1939, the relays passed from one to another the coffin, covered with the red and black flag [of Falange], until depositing it, provisionally [until the Valley of the Fallen was finished], on the floor of the main nave of the basilica of El Escorial, in front of the main altar". "Participating in the procession were the Youth Front, Sección Femenina, the trade unions and even units of the regular army. Large bonfires and religious services punctuated the journey. Falangists from all the provinces took turns carrying the coffin. Each relay was greeted by artillery salvos and bell tolls rang out in all the cities and towns of Spain. Teachers and professors interrupted classes in schools and universities to raise their arms in the fascist salute and shout: "José Antonio ¡Presente!". When the cortege arrived in Madrid, it was received by high commanders of the three armies and representatives of Nazi Germany and Fascist Italy. In the palace of San Lorenzo de El Escorial, the monumental wreaths offered by Hitler and Mussolini stood out". Like the transfers of the corpses of Generals Sanjurjo and Goded, that of the founder of Falange, "served to keep alive the hatreds of the Civil War".

In the late Francoist period, some Francoist politicians who had fought in the Civil War began to recognize that the treatment given to the defeated after the war had lacked dignity and generosity. This was the case of Antonio Pedrosa Latas who in an interview to the newspaper Informaciones in June 1975 (when General Franco was still alive) referred to the proposals of support to the mutilated republicans saying: "...to be honest I have to add that it took too long and could have been better. Indeed, a long time has passed since that conflict, when in my opinion, once it was over, a more dignified and generous treatment should have been given to the defeated". As Jorge de Esteban and Luis López Guerra have pointed out, "since the end of the war, the mutilated members of the Republican army were officially ignored ("because one cannot equate the defenders of truth with the defenders of error") and attempts to remedy their situation were rejected, even though proposals for improvement, within the Regime, have been in the sense of considering those mutilated as an object of state welfare and not as deserving of fair support for their services to the Spanish State from the Republican side, often for ideological reasons, others for discipline or mere geographical coincidence".

In those last years of Franco's dictatorship, the Catholic Church acknowledged its responsibility for the consequences of the civil war, although the document presented in September 1971 at the Joint Assembly of Bishops and Priests was not approved due to the lack of the necessary two-thirds majority (137 votes in favor versus 78). It asked for forgiveness "because we did not know how to be true ministers of reconciliation in the heart of our people, divided by a war between brothers". The "Liberation Crusade", the official denomination of the civil war that the Church had promoted and adopted in the collective Letter of the Spanish bishops on the occasion of the war in Spain in 1937, had given way to the "war between brothers". It was not until April 1975 that the Episcopal Conference approved (by seventy votes in favor and eleven against) the document Reconciliation in the Church and in Society. Collective Pastoral Letter of the Spanish Episcopate in which it was stated that in "our country, the progressive effort for the creation of adequate political structures and institutions must be sustained by the will to overcome the harmful effects of the civil strife that divided the citizens into winners and losers, and that still constitute a serious obstacle for a full reconciliation between brothers".

In conclusion, as Javier Tusell has pointed out, "Franco was a dictator insensitive to the sufferings of the defeated, incapable of liquidating a civil war and deified by the sincere belief that he was a providential man for his country".

== Francoism from 1939 to 1945 ==
=== Background ===
==== Fascistization during the Civil War (1936–1939) ====
The process of fascistization, that is, the adoption of the fascist ideology and its specific forms of political and social organization, following above all the model of Fascist Italy, began in the midst of the civil war. A first step was General Franco's decision to unify the right-wing political forces that had supported the anti-Republican uprising, "under my leadership, into a single political entity of national character, which for the time being will be called Falange Española Tradicionalista y de las JONS". In the Decree of Unification of April 1937, it was stated that the "Great Party of the State" was constituted, "as in other countries of totalitarian regime" —in reference to Fascist Italy and Nazi Germany—, to serve as a link "between Society and the State" and to spread in it "the political-moral virtues of service, hierarchy and brotherhood". Thus, the symbols of the new single party were those of Falangism — the use of the fascist salute, the emblem of the "yoke and arrows" the chant of the "Cara al Sol", the blue shirt uniform (although with the red Carlist beret)— and also its doctrinal principles: the "26 programmatic points of Falange", excluding the 27th, since it said: "We [the Falangists] will strive to triumph in the struggle with only the forces subject to our discipline. We will make few pacts. Only in the final push for the conquest of the State will the command manage the necessary collaborations, as long as our predominance is assured", and none of these circumstances were those that were given in 1937.

Flag of FE-JONS adopted by the "single party" of Francoism FET-JONS created by the Decree of Unification of April 1937.

Likewise, among the leaders of the new "single party", Falangists predominated over Carlists and others. In a July 1937 interview with United Press International, the "Caudillo" recognized that "nationalist Spain would follow the structure of the totalitarian regimes, like Italy and Germany", and this was confirmed by the constitution in October 1937 of the National Council of Falange — "imitation of the Grand Council of Fascism of Italy"—, whose 50 members were appointed by the Generalissimo.

On January 30, 1938, the same day he formed his first government, the Generalissimo promulgated the Law of Central Administration of the State which sanctioned the "totalitarian" single-party system which was being built in the zone of the uprising and conferred on him practically absolute power by establishing in one of its articles that he had "the supreme power to dictate legal norms of general interest". This law, along with the one he promulgated in August 1939, constituted the legal foundation of his long dictatorship.

Another decisive step in the process of fascistization was the approval on March 6, 1938, of the Fuero del Trabajo, the first "fundamental law" of Francoism, in which the influence of the "Carta del Lavoro" of Italian fascism, promulgated by Mussolini in 1927, was evident. The Fuero del Trabajo, which gave "official" birth to National Syndicalism, included "a resolutely fascist declaration of principles":

Renewing the Catholic Tradition, of social justice and high human sense that informed our legislation of the Empire, the State, National insofar as it is a totalitarian instrument at the service of patriotic integrity, and Syndicalist insofar as it represents an action against liberal capitalism and Marxist materialism, undertakes the task of channeling with a military, constructive and gravely religious air the Revolution that Spain has pending and that has to return to the Spaniards, once and for all, the Homeland, Bread and Justice.

Moreover, from the beginning of the civil war, there was an intimate alliance between the Catholic Church and the rebels, which would be reflected in a reciprocal collaboration to achieve their respective interests. This will give rise to a particular ideology of the regime, National Catholicism, with the consequent changes in the rebel zone, such as the obligatory nature of religion in primary and secondary education, or the imposition of the crucifix in institutes and universities. The Generalissimo used, for his part, the Catholic faith to legitimize his Crusade, and from the end of the war the Spanish Patriotic Catechism of Bishop Menéndez-Reigada (without imprimatur, and with his well-known anti-Semitic and anti-democratic proclamations) was obligatory in schools; according to the socialist Juan Simeón Vidarte, the catechism of Father Ripalda was also modified, adding to the fifth commandment (thou shalt not kill) the following words: unless they are reds, or enemies of the glorious movement.

All in all, the ideology of Franco's regime in the first era represented a synthesis of National Catholicism, Fascism and National Syndicalism to create a pwrsonalized dictatorship that ruled over Spain through force.

=== Alignment with the Axis and acceleration of fascistization (1939–1942) ===
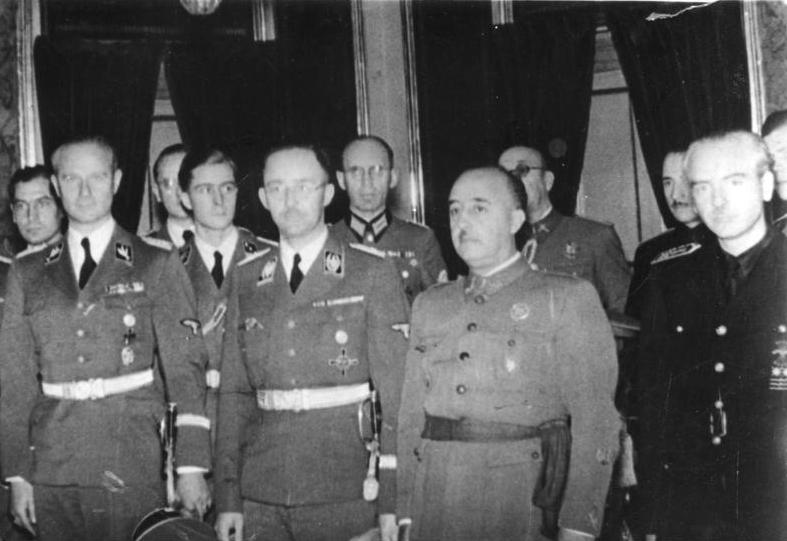
General Franco with Nazi leader Heinrich Himmler during his visit to Madrid in 1940.

After the end of the civil war, the links with the fascist regimes were accentuated and the process of fascization accelerated. On April 7, 1939, only a week after the Last report of the Spanish Civil War, General Franco announced his adhesion to the Anti-Comintern Pact signed by Germany, Italy and Japan, and shortly afterwards he left the League of Nations. Franco also signed the German-Spanish Treaty of Friendship to signify the country's official alignment with Nazi Germany and Fascist Italy.

General Franco installed himself in the palace of El Pardo "with all the pomp and ceremony worthy of royalty (including the exotic Guardia Mora)". In Burgos he promulgated the Law of August 8, 1939, modifying the organization of the Central State Administration established by those of January 30 and December 29, 1938 (BOE of August 9, 1939), which reaffirmed in his person all the Powers which he had assumed by virtue of the Decree of the Junta de Defensa Nacional of September 29, 1936 —as Head of State he had "the supreme power to dictate legal norms of a general nature" and he held "permanently the functions of government" (article 7)—. The following day he appointed his second government, again made up of personalities from all the political "families" of the winning coalition in the civil war, but with the "determining influence" of the Fascists of the Falange, since the "strong man" of the government was the "brother-in-law" Ramón Serrano Suñer, who had just been appointed by Franco as Head of the Political Board of FET y de las JONS and also held the portfolio of the Interior, the key Ministry, since he controlled all the press and the propaganda apparatus.

When World War II began on September 1, 1939, General Franco was forced to proclaim Spain's "strictest neutrality" due to the precarious economic conditions the country was going through after a civil war that had ended only five months earlier. However, the regime provided support to the Axis Powers by allowing German U-boats to refuel in Spanish ports and launched a pro-Nazi propaganda campaign in the Falangist press, in addition to a then-ongoing rearmament program. Eventually, the German victories over the Netherlands, Belgium and France in June 1940 and the entry into the war of Italy on the side of Germany —on the 10th—, turned the situation around. And so on June 13, 1940, when the Germans were about to enter Paris, General Franco abandoned "strict neutrality" and declared himself "non-belligerent", which was the status Italy had adopted before entering the war. The following day the Spanish troops occupied Tangier, an international city that was de facto incorporated into the Spanish Protectorate of Morocco.

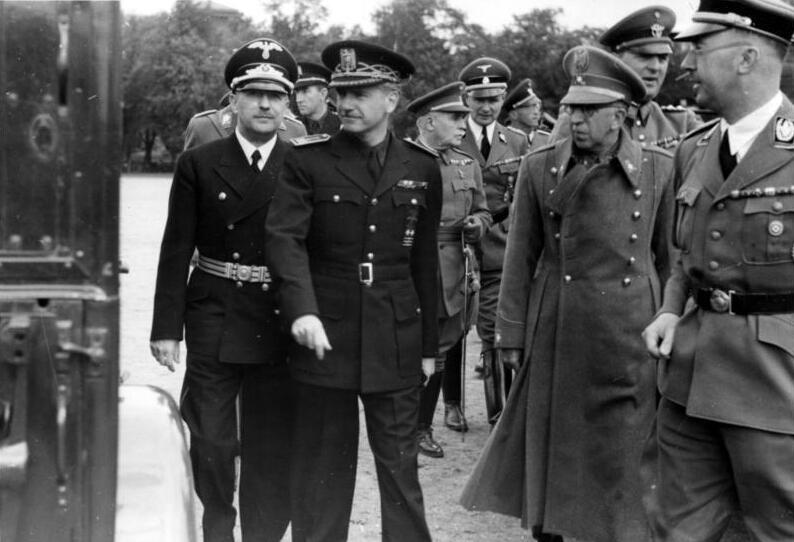
Visit to Berlin of the brother-in-law (cuñadísimo) Ramón Serrano Suñer, accompanied by General Antonio Sagardía, being received by Himmler.

On October 23, 1940, Franco and Hitler held a meeting in Hendaye to fix the terms for Spain's entry into the war on the side of the Axis powers. However, after seven hours of meeting Hitler still considered the Spanish demands exorbitant: the return of Gibraltar (after the defeat of the United Kingdom); the cession of French Morocco and a part of French Algeria to Spain plus the French Cameroon that would join the Spanish colony of Equatorial Guinea; the sending of German supplies of food, oil and weapons to alleviate the critical economic and military situation that Spain was suffering. Thus the meeting ended in failure and Spain ultimately remained neutral with the only result of the interview was the signing of a secret protocol in which Franco committed himself to enter the war on a date to be determined by him and in which Hitler only vaguely guaranteed that Spain would receive "territories in Africa". Another result was that, when Hitler began the invasion of the Soviet Union on June 22, 1941, General Franco decided to send a contingent of volunteer soldiers and officers (some 47,000 men), which would be known as the "Blue Division" (after the color of the Falangist uniform).

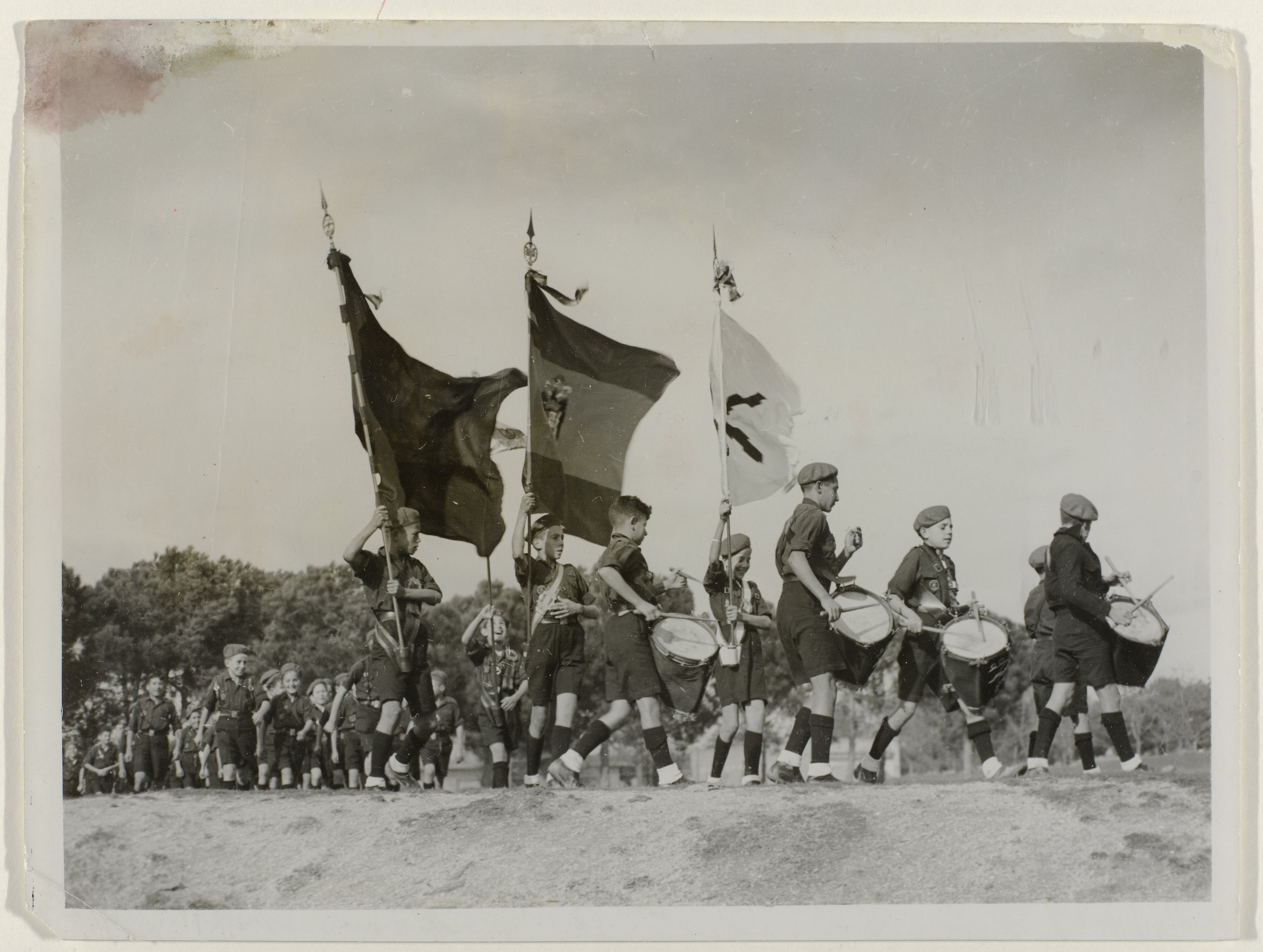
Parade of the Youth Front led by the flags of Spain (with the Francoist coat of arms), the Falange and the Traditionalist Communion (1941).

In step with the Axis military successes, the Francoist regime accelerated its fascistization process under the inspiration and direction of Serrano Suñer —who also accumulated the Ministry of Foreign Affairs—: the propaganda apparatus of the regime was placed in the hands of the "single party", intervening in the management of the Church media and creating an extensive network of state and Falangist press and radio; the framing and social mobilization was set in motion through three sectorial organizations of the party (the Youth Front, the Sindicato Español Universitario (SEU) and the Sección Femenina, whose purpose was to "train women with a Christian and national-syndicalist sense"); an extensive "nationalsyndicalist" framework was created called Organización Sindical Española (OSE), in which all "producers" (employers and workers) were obliged to join under the principles of "verticality, unity, totality and hierarchy" and which was dominated by the Falangist bureaucracy —in the words of one of its Falangist leaders: "the vertical unions are not instruments of class struggle. They, on the contrary, place as the first of their aspirations, not the suppression of classes, which must always exist, but their harmonization and cooperation under the sign of the general interest of the Motherland"—.

On July 17, 1942, General Franco promulgated his second "fundamental law", the Constitutive Law of the Cortes, as the "highest organ of participation of the Spanish people in the work of the State" and the sphere for "the contrast of opinions, within the unity of the regime", but which had no legislative capacity, but merely "consultative". However, the meeting of the Cortes would not become effective until February of the following year, when the change in the sign of the world war began to be confirmed, after the Nazi defeat in the battle of Stalingrad.

=== Halting of fascization and return to neutrality (1942–1945) ===
The fascistization process provoked serious fears among the other two pillars of Francoism: the Catholic Church and the Army. Tensions with the "single party" would end up exploding in August 1942 with the Begoña bombing, which provoked a serious political crisis that General Franco resolved by dismissing the "cuñadísimo" Serrano Suñer. On August 16, a group of Falangists threw two grenades against the crowd leaving a mass presided by General José Enrique Varela, Minister of the Army, in the basilica of the Virgin of Begoña (in Bilbao) in honor of the fallen Carlist fighters during the civil war. The military high command headed by Varela himself, seconded by General Valentín Galarza, Minister of the Interior, considered the attack as an "attack on the Army" by the Falange and demanded the dismissal of Serrano Suñer —one of the perpetrators of the attack was court-martialed and executed—. General Franco satisfied this demand on September 3 and dismissed Serrano (who was replaced by the royalist General Francisco Gómez-Jordana, who was again in charge of the Ministry of Foreign Affairs), but he wanted to put on record who was in power, and at the same time dismissed the two generals, Varela and Galarza, who had led the petition, replacing them with two military men loyal to his leadership.

In November 1942, British and American troops landed in North Africa to dislodge Rommel's Afrika Korps and Italian troops. For Franco it was the end of his imperial dreams and a possible risk of invasion by the Allies given his alignment with Germany and Italy. Despite this, on December 7, the first anniversary of the Japanese attack on Pearl Harbor, he still made a fascist speech: "We are witnessing the end of one era and the beginning of another. The liberal world succumbs, victim of the cancer of its own errors, and with it collapses commercial imperialism, financial capitalisms and its millions of unemployed (...) The destiny of our era will be realized, either by the barbaric formula of a Bolshevik totalitarianism, or by the patriotic and spiritual one that Spain offers, or by any other of the fascist peoples.... They are deceived, therefore, who dream of the establishment in the West of Europe of demoliberal systems".

However, it was not until after the fall of Mussolini in July 1943, following the Allied landing in Sicily, that General Franco returned to "strict neutrality" against his own wishes, as he had confessed to the Italian Ambassador in April 1943, on the eve of the Anglo-American invasion: "My heart is with you and I wish for the victory of the Axis. It is in my interest and in the interest of my country, but you cannot forget the difficulties I have to face both in the international sphere and in domestic politics".

The abandonment of "non-belligerency" was decreed by Franco on October 1, 1943, the seventh anniversary of his appointment by his fellow soldiers as Generalissimo, and the following month he ordered the withdrawal of the "Blue Division" from the Russian front and the paralyzation of the fascist process. In November 1944, in an interview granted to the American agency United Press, Franco went so far as to affirm that his regime had maintained "absolute neutrality during the war, and that it had nothing to do with fascism", since it was an "organic democracy". At the same time he instructed the Minister of Justice to prepare a draft of a possible law of rights.

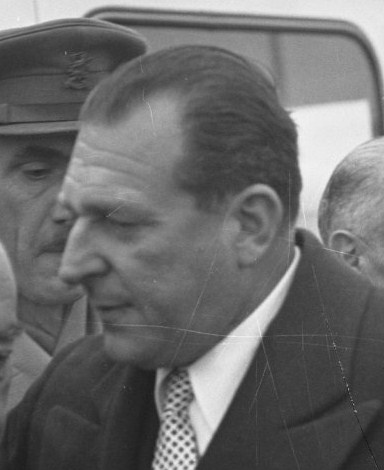
Juan de Borbón, legitimate heir of King Alfonso XIII, who demanded from Franco the restoration of the Monarchy when the course of World War II changed in favor of the Allies.

The change in the course of the war brought about the most serious crisis that the dictatorial power of Generalissimo Franco experienced, since it was the moment in his entire long existence when he came closest to losing power. It all began in March 1943 when Don Juan de Borbón, third son and legitimate heir of King Alfonso XIII (who died in Rome on February 28, 1941) and who was living in exile in Lausanne (Switzerland), sent a letter to General Franco in which he asked him to prepare "the rapid transition to the Restoration" of the Monarchy before the foreseeable Allied victory, warning him of the "very serious risks to which the current provisional and uncertain regime exposes Spain". Franco took two months to respond and when he did, he denied that his regime was "provisional". But the fall of Mussolini in July 1943 and the capitulation of Italy to the Allies gave new impetus to the monarchist cause. On September 8, 1943, General Franco received a letter signed by eight of the twelve lieutenant generals asking him to consider the restoration of the monarchy (it would be the only time in 39 years that the majority of the generals asked Franco to resign). But Franco did not make the slightest concession and limited himself to wait and to place in key positions military men loyal to him.

In January 1944, a new petition from Don Juan in favor of the "urgent transition from the Falangist regime to the monarchical restoration", was answered very harshly by Franco, reminding the pretender that "neither the regime overthrew the monarchy nor was it obliged to reestablish it" and that the legitimacy of his exceptional powers came from "having achieved, with the divine favor repeatedly lavished on it, victory and saved society from chaos", and added some very vague promises of a return to the monarchy.

=== Economic policy: autarchy and rationing ===
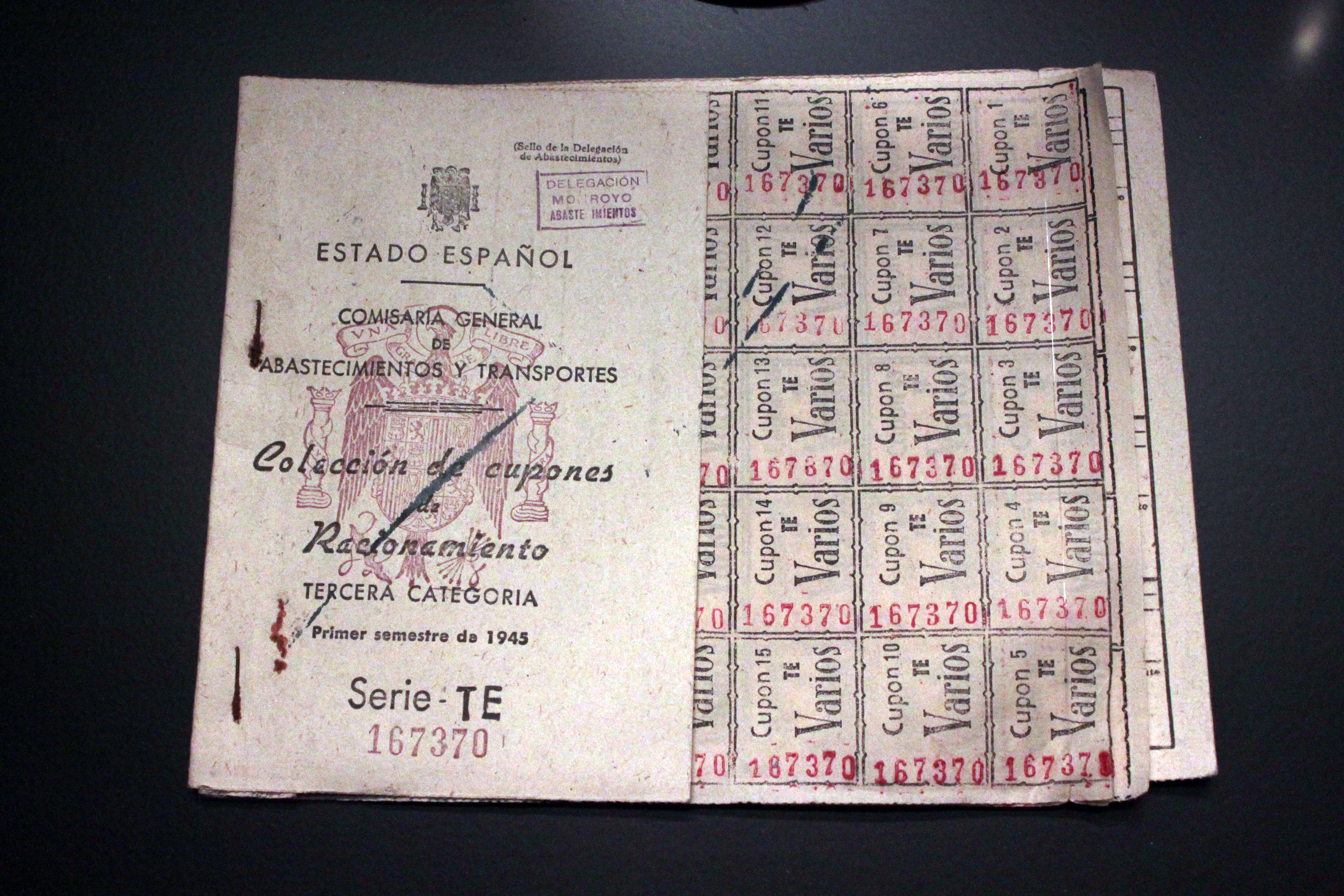
Spanish rationing card of 1945.

Today most historians agree in attributing the long duration and depth of the post-war economic crisis and famine —the income level of 1935 was not recovered until well into the 1950s— to the catastrophic autarkic and interventionist economic policy pursued by the Franco regime during the 1940s, which only began to be partially rectified in the 1950s. As Javier Tusell has pointed out, "autarchy and interventionism were two persistent trends in the Spanish economy since the beginning of the century, but now they reached a development and magnitude unknown until then".

This policy was based on three principles that were taken from the Dictatorship of Primo de Rivera and from the economic approaches of European fascism, especially Italian fascism. The first was the subordination of the economy to a higher, political goal: to turn Spain into a great military and imperial power. To this purpose, the State would take over the task of ordering and regulating economic activity because, according to Franco's "economists", in the market economy "particular" interests (of businessmen and workers, confronted in a "class struggle") prevailed over "the supreme interest of the nation". The result was a lousy allocation of productive resources, as the market was replaced by a prolix regulatory legislation and by the creation of a multitude of intervening bodies such as the General Commissariat of Supplies and Transport or the National Wheat Service. The proof of the malfunctioning of the system was the immediate emergence, outside the regulated market (and the rationing cards), of a black market, known as "estraperlo", to which products were sent because they fetched higher prices.

The second principle was the strengthening of the sectors most closely linked to military power, relegating to second place the consumer goods industry and agriculture, since the objective of the economic policy was not to improve the levels of welfare of the population but to turn Spain into a great power, and to this objective everything else had to be sacrificed, including efficiency, whatever it might cost. The fundamental instrument of this policy was the INI, the National Institute of Industry, which gave ample proof of its ignorance of the most elementary principles of economics.

The third principle was autarky. A country with the "vocation of empire" could not depend on other countries and, even less so, on other rival powers, so its ultimate goal had to be to become self-sufficient. General Franco himself was, once again, the main proponent of this idea, since, as he declared in 1938, he was convinced that "Spain is a privileged country that can be self-sufficient. We have everything we need to live and our production is sufficiently abundant to ensure our own subsistence. We have no need to import anything". Thus, the autarkic policy would be based on an extreme protectionism and a limitation of imports, which would remain under the iron control of the State. In addition, this autarkic policy was accompanied by an exchange policy based on a "strong" peseta.

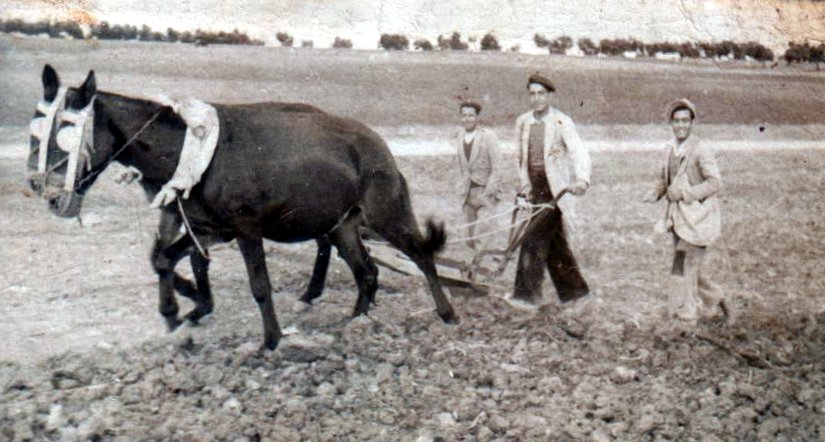
Image of a plow in 1950 in El Saucejo, province of Seville. Spanish agriculture during the 1940s was characterized by low productivity and scarce technification.

The results of the application of the autarkic and interventionist policy in the service of "an imperial military state" was "a deep economic depression that lasted more than a decade". There was a sharp fall in agricultural production which caused a very serious famine known as the Anos de Hambre or Years of Hunger which lasted from 1939 to 1942 killing over 200,000 Spaniards and only when the shortage became dramatic in the second half of the 1940s, General Franco authorized the importation of food products, so that only with the help of Argentine and American wheat, Spain was saved from a total food catastrophe.

The living and working conditions of day laborers, poor peasants, industrial workers and service workers worsened, with a marked decline in real wages. The industrialization process that Spain had been undergoing since the second decade of the 20th century was interrupted, and it was not possible to recover the industrial levels of 1935 until fifteen years after the end of the war, in 1955. Inflation soared, due to the large budget deficits financed with issues of pledgeable debt that was taken by private banks, which could immediately transform it into cash (monetize) at the Bank of Spain.

The economic historian Carlos Barciela, reviewing the years of Franco's autarky, pointed out that "the level of national income and per capita income of 1935 did not recover until the 1950s" and that "the population's consumption, including that of basic necessities, plummeted dramatically, and hunger was felt by millions of Spaniards", although this bad economic situation did not affect all Spaniards equally since while "the real salaries of the workers experienced a notable and generalized decrease" and "the profits of the great agrarian owners, of the companies and of the banks increased". "The war was also prolonged in the labor sphere", he adds. Barciela concludes that the "evolution of the Spanish economy in the forties was catastrophic".

The evolution of the Spanish economy in the 1940s was catastrophic. There is no comparison between the post-war crisis in European countries and the one suffered by Spain. In our country, the crisis was longer and deeper. The collapse of production and shortages resulted in a dramatic drop in the level of Spanish consumption. Basic necessities were subjected to rigorous rationing and a large black market soon emerged; the rationing cards for basic products did not disappear until 1952. Underconsumption, hunger, coal shortages, cold in homes, power cuts, lack of running water and disease were the features that dominated daily life. Far away were the high-flown imperial proclamations and Franco's slogans: "Not a Spaniard without bread, not a home without fire". To this we have to add the pitiful working conditions... with freedom of association suppressed and strikes declared a crime against the motherland, the new nationalsyndicalism was born as an instrument for the subjugation of the workers. On the contrary, the employers maintained a certain autonomy and, in fact, it was the bosses who took control of the union apparatus and not the other way around.

== Francoism from 1945 to 1950 ==
=== International rejection and offensive of the opposition (1945–1946) ===
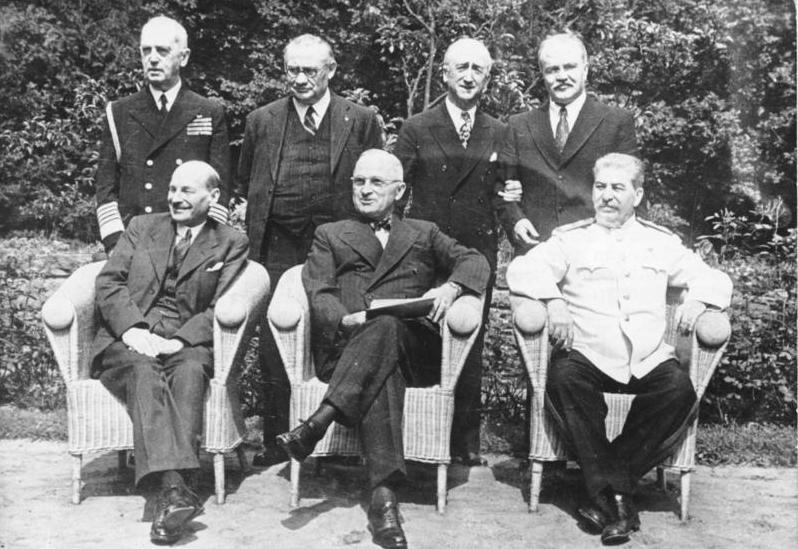
Group photo after the Potsdam Conference: Clement Attlee, Harry S. Truman and Iósif Stalin (seated).

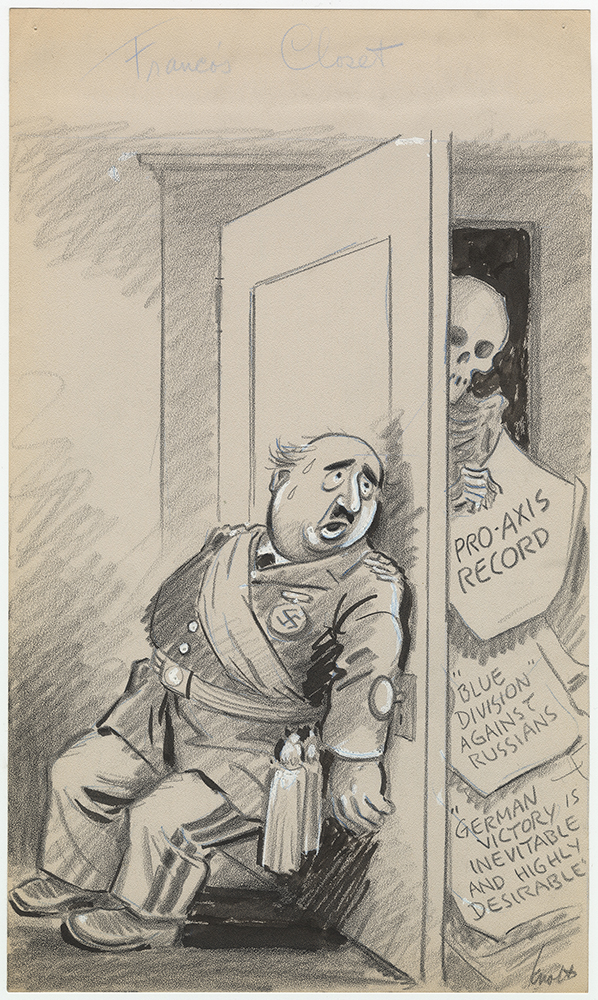
Cartoon by American cartoonist John F. Knott (1945) showing a General Franco with the Nazi swastika who is threatened by his collaboration with Axis powers in World War II, such as statements in favor of their victory or sending the Blue Division to the Russian front.

On March 10, 1945, U.S. President Roosevelt informed his ambassador in Madrid that "there is no place in the United Nations for a government founded on fascist principles". For this reason, the Franco regime was excluded from the San Francisco conference that would create the UN, and to which Republicans in exile were invited as observers.

At the Potsdam Conference, which brought together the three victorious powers in World War II (the United States, the United Kingdom and the Soviet Union), the "Spanish question" was discussed and on August 2 a declaration was made public stating:

The three governments, however, feel compelled to declare that, for their part, they will not support any application for membership (in the UN) of the present Spanish Government, which, having been established with the support of the Axis powers, does not possess, by reason of its origins, its nature, its record and its close association with the aggressor countries, the qualities necessary to justify such membership.

The declarations of the Allies aroused enormous expectations among the Republican opposition, which in 1943 after the change of the course of the world war had founded in exile the Spanish Liberation Junta (JEL), chaired by Diego Martínez Barrio, which acted before the Allies as if it were a provisional government, while in the interior of Spain the clandestine contacts between socialists, anarchists and republicans led to the formation in October 1944 of the National Alliance of Democratic Forces, which did not include either the communists or the "Negrinist" socialists —who had also been excluded from the JEL—, and which was willing to make a pact with the monarchist forces for the reestablishment of democracy without making the restoration of the Republic a condition. Likewise, since 1944 the anarchist, socialist and communist guerrilla activity (the "maquis") had intensified, the most outstanding event of which was Operation Reconquest of Spain in October 1944, organized by the Spanish National Union founded by the PCE, which consisted of the invasion of Spain through the Aran valley by a contingent of some 3,000 communist guerrillas, but which was a resounding failure when they were defeated by the Army and the Civil Guard, and did not receive any support from the population. The guerrillas, who were forced to return to France ten days after the beginning of the operation, had 129 dead and 588 wounded.

To deal with guerrilla activity, the regime established controls over the movements of the population and in April 1947 General Franco promulgated the Law of Banditry and Terrorism, the preamble of which stated that he intended to use "special measures of repression" to combat "the most serious criminal species of any post-war situation, a consequence of the relaxation of moral ties and the exaltation of the impulses of cruelty and the aggressiveness of criminal and maladjusted people". The articles established the assumptions in which the death penalty would be applied to "evildoers" —or "bandits"—, which not only included having killed someone, but also having wielded "a weapon of war" or having detained "travelers in unpopulated areas". Both the guerrillas and the Army and Civil Guard units that fought them resorted to reprisals, "often reaching a terrified civilian population". "A captured guerrilla had little chance of staying alive" but neither did "a village mayor, or a notorious Francoist taken prisoner in a guerrilla raid".

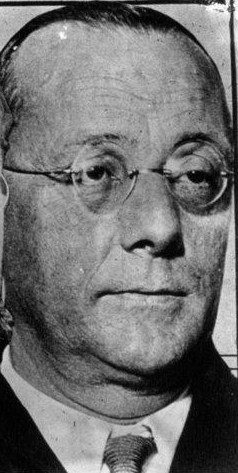
José Giral, President of the Government of the Republic in exile

While the activity of the maquis was increasing, in August 1945 a special session of the republican Cortes was held in Mexico in which Diego Martínez Barrio was elected president of the Second Spanish Republic in exile and a government presided by José Giral was appointed, from which the negrinists and the communists were excluded. However, the Republican government was not recognized by any of the victorious powers or by the UN —only by the Eastern European countries under the Soviet orbit and by Mexico, Venezuela, Panama and Guatemala—, so José Giral would end up presenting his resignation in February 1947 —two months after the declaration condemning Francoism by the UN in December 1946 made no mention of the Republican government in exile—. Another reason for his resignation was that Giral was opposed to the meetings that the socialist Indalecio Prieto was having with José María Gil Robles on behalf of the monarchists.

For this last reason the republican opposition was divided between those in favor of allying with the monarchists and accepting a referendum on the form of state, and those who continued to defend republican legitimacy. Another reason for confrontation was the strategy to be followed: whether to continue with the guerrilla struggle as a preliminary phase to the popular insurrection (as the CNT, the PSOE and the PCE were doing), or, on the contrary, to give priority to the diplomatic struggle to force an international action by the great powers and the UN (as the Basque and Catalan nationalists and the republican parties were advocating).

At the same time, the monarchists intensified their offensive. On March 19, 1945, when Hitler's defeat was very close, Don Juan de Borbón made a complete break with Franco's regime by publishing the Lausanne Manifesto in which he declared that "the regime established by General Franco, inspired from the beginning by the totalitarian systems of the Axis Powers", was incompatible with the Allied victory and "also compromises the future of the Nation". That is why he asked Franco to give way to a "traditional Monarchy" whose "primary tasks" would be: "immediate approval, by popular vote, of a political Constitution, recognition of all the rights inherent to the human person and guarantee of the corresponding political liberties; establishment of a Legislative Assembly elected by the Nation; recognition of regional diversity; broad political amnesty; a fairer distribution of wealth and the suppression of unjust social contrasts...". However, the rupture was not total because in August Eugenio Vegas Latapié in representation of Don Juan traveled incognito to Madrid where he met with Luis Carrero Blanco, the Caudillo's man of confidence, although they did not reach any agreement.

But Don Juan did not have an organized and united monarchist opposition within Spain and the Army strongly supported Franco as did the "collaborationist" monarchists. Nevertheless, the monarchist opposition intensified when in February 1946 Don Juan moved his official residence from Lausanne to Estoril (near Lisbon) and received a letter of welcome signed by 458 members of the Spanish elite, including two former ministers, which caused Franco deep concern —"it is a declaration of war", he said— and he ended up breaking off relations with Don Juan. On the other hand, the small sector of Carlism headed by the Count of Rodezno recognized Don Juan as its sovereign.

==== "Metamorphosis" of the regime ====
The response of Francoism to the international isolation and the resurgence of the monarchist opposition was the definitive paralyzation of the fascization process, and the introduction of certain changes that would make it more outwardly presentable, "but without reducing one iota the omnipotent and lifelong power" of the "Generalissimo". Already at the beginning of 1944 the secretary general of the single party had ordered the provincial delegates to stop using the expression "the Party" or "Falange Española Tradicionalista y de las JONS" and instead to refer to it with the expression "Movimiento Nacional". A year later, in September, the use of the "national salute" with raised arm ceased to be official, although members and supporters of the regime continued to use it profusely. At the same time, the party uniforms —blue shirt, red beret and belts; with white jacket and plate cap for the hierarchs of the regime— were disappearing from public life.

As for the legislative framework, the Franco regime from 1945 onwards took a turn, abandoning fascist totalitarianism and adopting the principles of what it called organic democracy, "aimed at giving the impression that it had constitutional mechanisms comparable to those of a parliamentary democracy and that the system could be liberalized without trauma within its own institutional channels".

A first step in this "metamorphosis" of the regime was the promulgation, on July 17, 1945, of the Fuero de los Españoles, the third of the "fundamental laws", which was intended to be a charter of rights and freedoms inspired by Catholic doctrine on the "dignity, integrity and liberty of the human person". But the restrictions it imposed —Article 33, for example, specified that none of the rights could be used to attack the "spiritual, national and social unity of Spain"— and the lack of guarantees in its exercise turned it into a mere rhetorical manifestation, which only satisfied the ecclesiastical hierarchy by ratifying the Catholic confessionalism of the Spanish State. "In the abstract, its initial declaration of principles did not differ much from what would be acceptable in a democratic system. But a large part of the articles were intended to legalize the mechanisms of control over the population as a whole, restrictively regulating the civic rights of association, assembly and expression and granting the Head of State total freedom to suspend the guarantees of the Fuero itself when he considered that public order or national sovereignty were in danger".

A second step was to appoint a new government —on July 18, five days after the promulgation of the Fuero de los Españoles—, in which the Catholic politician Alberto Martin Artajo, former deputy of the CEDA, would be in charge of the Ministry of Foreign Affairs, the most transcendental at that time, and who would be accompanied by two other ministers of the same tendency. At the same time, the relative Falangist postponement took place, with the disappearance of the portfolio of Minister-Secretary General of Falange. The objective was, therefore, to reinforce the Catholicism of the Regime and to offer a new image to the world.

The government then eliminated a good part of the Falangist symbols, such as the fascist salute with the raised arm, which in April 1937 had been declared "national salute", and when referring to the "single party" the official term Falange Española Tradicionalista y de las JONS was no longer used, but the name "Movimiento Nacional" or simply "el Movimiento" was preferred, although Franco did not want to dispense with it completely, considering it important to preserve some form of official political organization.

Instead, priority was given to the Catholic base of Francoism, which led to the creation of what was later called "national Catholicism": the restoration of the power of the Church and its identification with the Franco regime. Although the return to many aspects of religious life had already taken place during the civil war and the immediate post-war period, it was especially after 1945 that religious rites were introduced into all aspects of life, both public and private. As Santos Juliá has pointed out, from then on "all public and private spaces were resplendent with religious symbols, the teaching of religion in its variants of sacred history, dogma and Catholic morality became an obligatory task in schools; priests became the guardians of public morality; processions, campaign masses, popular missions [massive public campaigns of evangelization among the population], filled the streets of cities and towns with religious songs and music" . Thus, there was a "sacralization" of Spanish life that affected almost all public affairs and institutions. It was the restoration of traditional Catholic Spain.

Finally, on October 22, 1945, Franco promulgated the National Referendum Law —fourth of the "fundamental laws"— which allowed the Head of State to submit to consultation of the Spanish people —men and women over 21 years of age— those bills he considered appropriate —"when the importance of certain laws makes it advisable or the public interest demands it"—. The Generalissimo was the only one who could appreciate this circumstance and the only one who could convene them. Thus, as it happens in the non-democratic States which resort to plebiscites, the only two referendums which were held, in 1947 and 1966, were "a mere propagandistic instrument at the service of the legitimization of the regime". This law was followed in March 1946 by the modification of the Law of the Cortes, which increased the number of "elective" procurators by applying the corporate principle of the three thirds —the union, the municipal and the family—, but the election of the representation of the "family third" by men of legal age and married women took more than twenty years to be put into practice.

Areas where the maquis was active.

In addition to the "cosmetic" changes of the regime, Franco opted for the resistance to the extreme based on the belief that the alliance between the United States and the United Kingdom with the Soviet Union would soon be broken, given the incompatibility of the political and socio-economic projects that both sides advocated, and that in the end the Western powers would end up accepting him in the face of the "communist danger". That was what his man of confidence, Luis Carrero Blanco, advised him in a confidential report delivered at the end of August 1945, after the condemnation of Francoism by the Potsdam Conference:

The pressures of the Anglo-Saxons for a change in Spanish policy that would break the normal development of the present regime, will be all the less the more palpable our order, our unity and our impassibility in the face of indications, threats and impertinence. The only formula for us can only be: order, unity and endurance.

Thus, Franco, following Carrero's slogan of "order, unity and endurance", ordered to "close ranks" around the regime and obsessively recalled the civil war. To this end, guerrilla activity was used as "proof" that the civil war continued. In a report of October 1946, Carrero Blanco recommended to Franco the use of "all the levers that the Government and the Movement have in their hands on the basis that it is moral and licit to impose terror when it is based on justice and cuts off a greater evil (...) Direct action of beatings and chastisements, without reaching serious outpourings of blood, is recommendable against naive agitators who, without being agents of communism, play the game of the latter".

=== International isolation and "monarchic legitimization" (1946–1947) ===
The "cosmetic" changes and the campaign and activity deployed to convince the world that Francoism had nothing to do with the fascist powers defeated in the war, had no immediate effect. On November 20, 1945, the American ambassador left Madrid, and the effective ostracism of the Franco regime began on February 28, 1946, when the French government closed the border with Spain in protest against the executions of ten guerrillas, among them Cristino Garcia, a Resistance hero who had fought against the Nazi occupation. Four days later, a joint declaration by the United States, the United Kingdom and France, promoted by the latter, expressed its repudiation of Francoism and its confidence that "patriotic and liberal-minded Spaniards will find the means to achieve a peaceful withdrawal of Franco" and the return to democracy. An early test of what international isolation meant was Spain's exclusion from negotiations to re-establish international administration of Tangier, which Spain had occupied militarily for most of World War II.

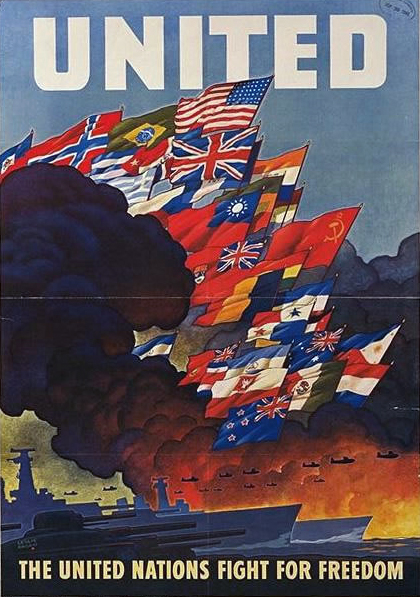
Poster of United Nations flags fighting the Axis powers (U.S. War Department, 1943).

At the same time, the question of sanctions to be imposed on the Franco regime was debated at the UN throughout that year, 1946, always with the refusal of the United Kingdom and the United States to agree on economic or military measures. Finally, on December 12, 1946, the UN General Assembly agreed by 34 votes in favor, six against and thirteen abstentions, to condemn Franco's regime in the following terms:

The General Assembly recalls that, in May and June 1946, the Security Council conducted an inquiry into possible further action to be taken by the United Nations [concerning Spain]. The sub-committee of the Security Council in charge of this inquiry resolved unanimously:

a) By its origin, nature, structure and general behavior, Franco's regime is a fascist regime, organized and implemented largely with the help of Nazi Germany and Mussolini's Italy.

b) During the long United Nations struggle against Hitler and Mussolini, Franco gave very considerable aid to the enemy powers, despite the continued protests of the Allies.

The subcommittee established incontrovertibly and with documentary evidence that Franco was guilty, along with Hitler and Mussolini, of conspiring to unleash the war against those countries which in the course of the war were grouped under the name of the United Nations. [...]

The General Assembly, convinced that the fascist Franco government in Spain, which was forcibly imposed on the Spanish people, and by its continued domination of Spain makes it impossible for this people to participate with those of the United Nations in international affairs. It recommends that the Franco government be prohibited from membership in the international organizations established by the United Nations until a new and adequate government is formed in Spain.[...]

[The General Assembly] recommends that, if within a reasonable time, a Government is not established in Spain whose authority derives from its people and which undertakes to respect freedom of speech, religion and assembly, and to hold as soon as possible elections in which the Spanish people may express their will, free from intimidation, the Security Council should consider measures to remedy the situation. The Assembly also recommends that all member states of the United Nations immediately withdraw their ambassadors and ministers plenipotentiary accredited to Madrid.

The recommendation of the immediate withdrawal of the ambassadors until "a government whose authority emanates from the consent of the governed" was established in Spain. It also was applied by the great majority of countries, with the exception of the Holy See, Portugal, Ireland, Switzerland and Juan Perón's Argentina. Anticipating the expected UN condemnation, the Franco regime organized on December 9, 1946, a great demonstration of "national indignation" in Madrid's Plaza de Oriente under the slogan "Franco yes, communism no!". From the main balcony of the Royal Palace, the Caudillo addressed the crowd and attributed the isolation of the regime to a conspiracy of Freemasonry and communism:

When a wave of Communist terror ravages Europe and violations, crimes and persecutions of the same order as many of those you witnessed or suffered preside over the life of yesterday's independent nations, in the greatest of impunities, it should not surprise us that the children of Giral and La Pasionaria find toleration in the atmosphere and support in the official representatives of those unfortunate peoples.

Furthermore, on the same day that the UN General Assembly condemned the regime, the Francoist Cortes approved the minting of new coins with the effigy of Franco with the legend: "Francisco Franco Caudillo de España por la Gracia de Dios" (Francisco Franco Caudillo of Spain by the Grace of God).

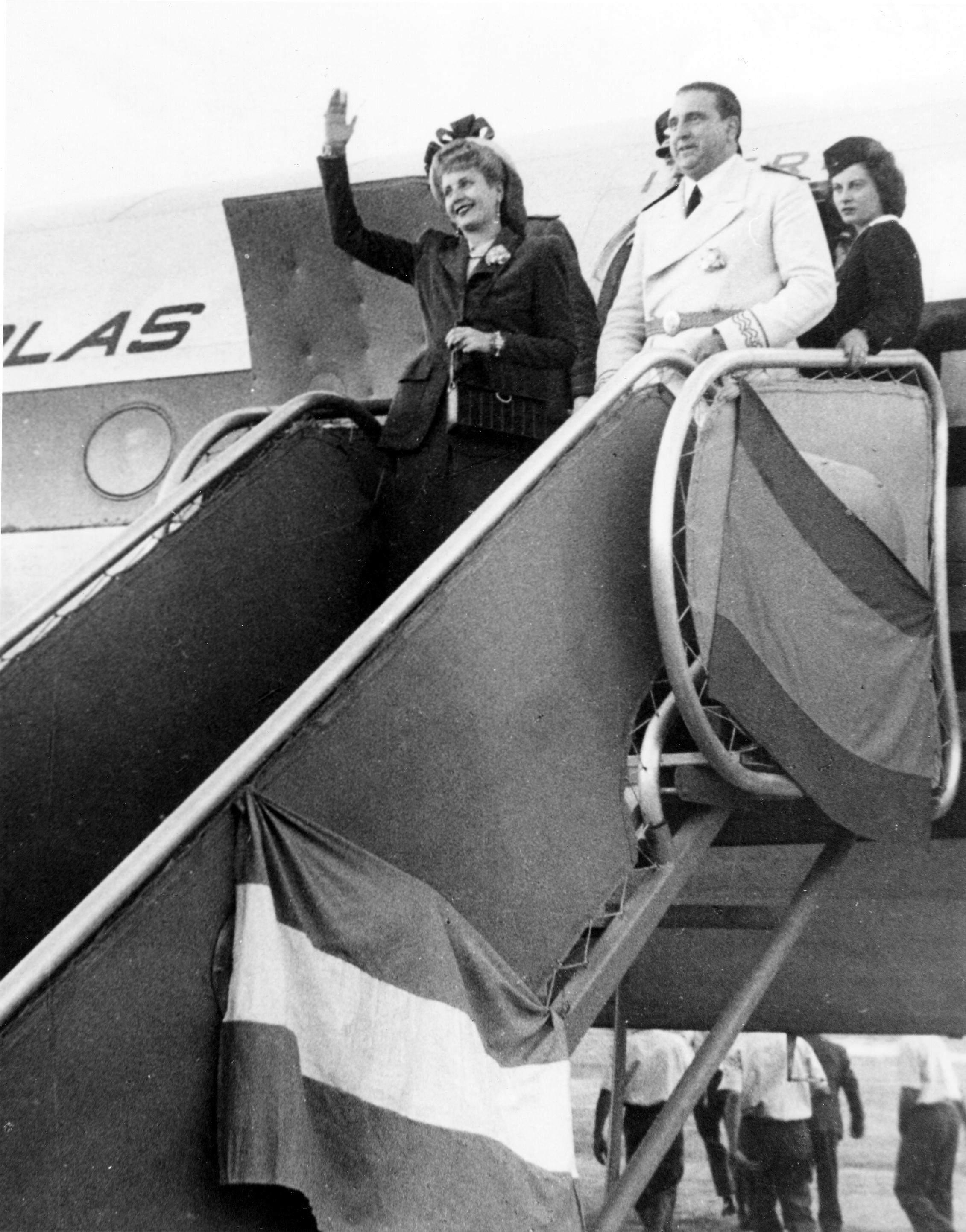
Arrival of Evita Perón in Spain (June, 1947). Juan Perón's Argentina was one of the few supports the Franco dictatorship could count on during its international isolation.

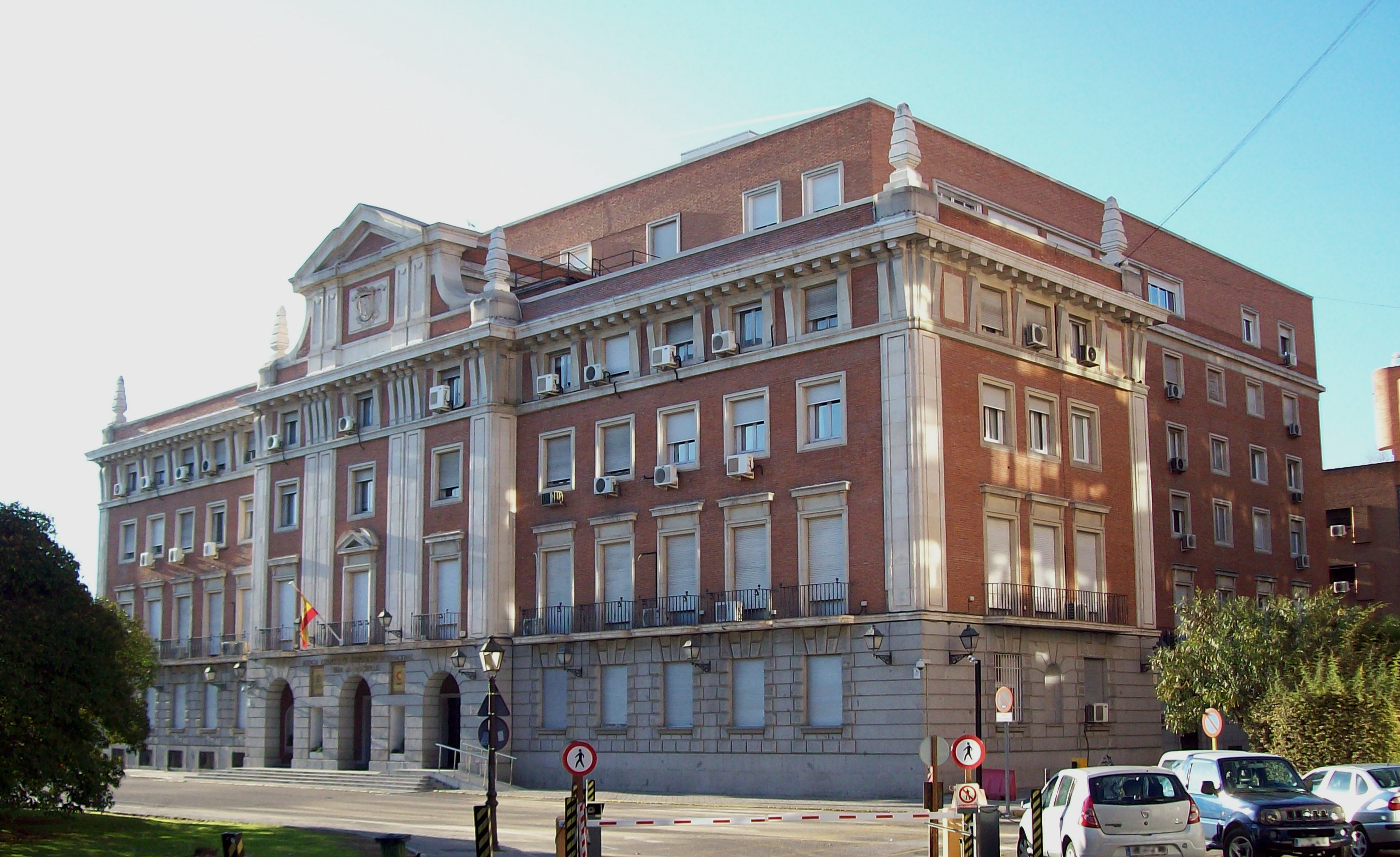
The Instituto de Cultura Hispánica, created in 1945 to overcome the international isolation of Franco's regime by seeking support in Latin America, an "indestructible spiritual community", according to Falangist rhetoric, was headquartered there.

Another way to confront isolation was to seek international support from Catholic and anti-communist circles around the world. In Washington, José Félix de Lequerica organized a pro-Franco lobby, coordinated by the lawyer Charles P. Clark and made up of politicians, military, businessmen and conservative and anti-communist Catholic activists. In order to attract Latin American countries, the Instituto de Cultura Hispánica was created in December 1945 and among them he found the support of Perón's Argentina, which not only did not withdraw its representative in Madrid and elevated him to the rank of ambassador, but its economic aid was very important for the survival of the regime. Two months before the formal condemnation by the UN, Juan Domingo Perón had already granted a credit line to Spain which allowed it to import 400,000 tons of Argentine wheat. The following year, after the visit of Eva Duarte de Perón Evita to Spain in June, another one for 750 million dollars, to which was added the so-called Franco-Perón Protocol signed in April 1948, an agreement by which Argentina undertook to supply Spain with 300,000 tons of wheat and to cover the grain deficits that occurred between 1949 and 1951, in addition to supplying corn and edible oil. Another strategy of Franco's foreign policy to overcome isolation was to take the side of the Arab countries in the conflict over Palestine with the Jews settled there who demanded a state of their own.

However, Franco's main strategy for survival was to seek monarchical legitimization. Thus, in March 1947, the "crucial" Law of Succession to the Presidency of the State (the fifth "fundamental law") was published, whose Article 1 defined the form of the Spanish political regime as "a Catholic, social and representative State, which, in accordance with its tradition, declares itself to be constituted as a Kingdom". Article 2 granted for life the "Head of State" to the "Caudillo of Spain and of the Crusade, Generalissimo of the Armies" —a formula that brought together all the charismatic legitimacies of his power: the party, the Church and the Army—, thus making Franco de facto regent for life in this "monarchy without a king" (or "nominal monarchy") that the previous article had proclaimed. Article 6 conferred on Franco the right to designate a successor "in the title of King or Regent" "at any time" and with full capacity to revoke his decision. Finally, the law created two new State bodies: the Council of Regency, which would act in the event that Franco died without having designated a successor, and the Council of the Realm, as the highest advisory body to the Head of State "in transcendental matters and resolutions of his exclusive competence". Thus, the Monarchy would not be restored but installed in the person of the royalty that General Franco would decide, thus turning his successor "into a puppet of the dictator and his political heirs".

The contents of the Law of Succession were known to Don Juan de Borbón before it was promulgated, thanks to the interview he had with Franco's envoy, Luis Carrero Blanco. As no mention was made of any dynastic right of succession, Don Juan's response was not long in coming in the form of a new declaration -—the Estoril Manifesto of April 7, 1947— in which he rejected the Law and defended the hereditary rights of succession to the throne, which were vested in his person. This message was not made public in Spain, where the press launched a campaign against "the pretender". The Estoril Manifesto denounced that the law tried to "convert a "personal dictatorship" into a "lifetime" and to disguise "with the glorious mantle of the Monarchy a regime of pure governmental arbitrariness", and affirmed the "supreme principle of legitimacy" that fell on Don Juan and "the imprescriptible rights of sovereignty that the providence of God has willed to come to converge" in him. Don Juan then declared himself "willing to facilitate everything that would ensure the normal and unconditional transmission of powers". The Estorial Manifesto was based on the Bases Institucionales de la Monarquía Española, also known as the Bases de Estoril, made public two months earlier, which defended a model of traditional Monarchy based on "the Catholic Religion, the sacred unity of the Motherland and the representative Monarchy" and with an organic, corporative and therefore non-democratic Cortes.

As Paul Preston has pointed out, after the promulgation of the Law of Succession, Franco acted "in the manner of a monarch in the newly proclaimed kingdom of Spain" and "took for himself royal prerogatives to the point of creating noble titles". General José Moscardó, for example, received the title of Count of the Alcázar of Toledo.

In order to seek the "democratic" legitimacy of the regime, the law was first approved by the Cortes on June 7, and then submitted to referendum on July 6, 1947, producing a very high participation and the affirmative vote of 93% of the voters as a result of the official propaganda —the only one allowed— and other pressure measures —for example, the presentation and stamping of the ration book as a form of electoral identificatio—. On the other hand, the Falange did not look favorably on the Law of Succession, since it was dominated by anti-Borbonic or pro-Republican sentiments and was considered a concession to the conservative sectors.

=== End of isolation, defeat of the opposition and consolidation of the regime (1947–1950) ===
By the end of 1947 there was the first evidence that the attitude of the Western powers towards the Franco regime was beginning to change, with the split into two blocs between the former allies of World War II (the "free world" versus the "communist dictatorship", as United States President Harry S. Truman put it). Thus, the outbreak of the "cold war" ended up favoring General Franco, as Spain had a new strategic value for the "free world" bloc in the face of a possible Soviet attack on Western Europe. In November 1947 the United States successfully opposed in the United Nations a new condemnation of the Franco regime and the imposition of new sanctions. Four months later, France reopened the border with Spain, and between May and June 1948 trade and financial agreements were signed with France and the United Kingdom. At the beginning of 1949, Franco's regime received the first credit granted by an American bank with the approval of his government (for a value of 25 million dollars). Shortly before, the chairman of the U.S. Senate Armed Services Committee had visited Spain.

The process of "rehabilitation" of the Franco dictatorship was formally completed in 1950, after the Korean War, the first major confrontation of the "cold war", broke out in June of that year. As soon as the news of the invasion of South Korea by North Korea became known, the Spanish government rushed to send a note to the United States government saying: "Spain would like to help the United States to stop communism by sending forces to Korea". The U.S. government merely thanked them, but the following month the Senate, at the proposal of Democratic Senator Pat McCarran (a member of the Spanish Lobby created by Lequerica), authorized the Export-Import Bank to grant Spain a credit of 62.5 million dollars. On November 4, 1950, the UN General Assembly revoked by a large majority (thanks to American support and French and British abstention) the resolution condemning Franco's regime of December 1946 (38 countries voted in favor, 10 voted against and 12 abstained). Thus, in the following months the Western ambassadors returned to Madrid and Spain's entry into the UN's specialized international organizations was approved.

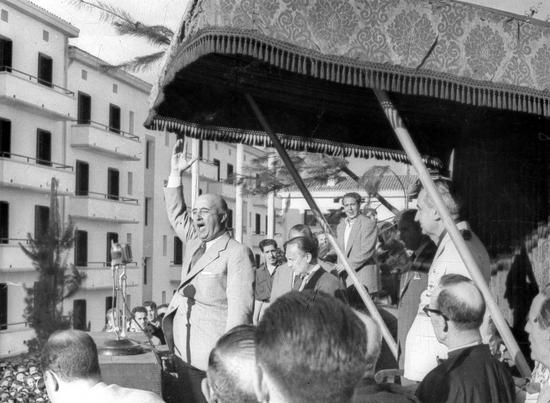
Franco giving a speech in Eibar in 1949. During the period of the regime's isolation, General Franco rarely appeared in military attire, unlike during the rest of his dictatorship.

The international rehabilitation of Franco's regime and the approval by referendum of the Law of Succession in July 1947 weakened the monarchist option to such an extent that Don Juan de Borbón changed his strategy with respect to Franco and on August 25, 1948, he met with the Generalissimo on his yacht Azor anchored in the Bay of Biscay. As a result, it was agreed that Don Juan's son, Juan Carlos de Borbón, would be educated in Spain under the tutelage of General Franco (on November 7, the 10-year-old prince arrived in Spain). The interview had been promoted by the collaborationist monarchists, such as the Duke of Sotomayor and Julio Danvila, and the general was accompanied by Prince Jaime de Borbón, Don Juan's older brother, "perhaps as a reminder that there were changes in the struggle for the restoration of the Monarchy".

The agreement reached between Franco and Don Juan, which implicitly recognized the legitimacy of Franco's regime, left without effect the agreement formalized in San Juan de Luz three days later between José María Gil Robles, representing the non-collaborationist Juanist monarchists of the Confederation of Monarchist Forces, and Indalecio Prieto, representing the Confederation of Monarchist Forces, and Indalecio Prieto, representing part of the Republican opposition, in which they had agreed to fight jointly to overthrow Franco's dictatorship, after which a provisional government would be formed to call a plebiscite to decide the "definitive political regime", republican or monarchist. The talks had begun under the auspices of the British Labor government, specifically Ernest Bevin, Foreign Office Secretary, who had brought together Gil Robles and Prieto in London on October 17, 1946, to promote the transition to democracy in Spain. Shortly after the fiasco of the San Juan de Luz agreement, Indalecio Prieto resigned as president of the PSOE ("My failure is complete", he admitted), being replaced by Rodolfo Llopis. In July 1951, Don Juan wrote a letter to Franco in which he rejected the collaboration of the monarchists with the socialists and in which he said: "Let us reach an agreement to prepare a stable regime". Although Franco ignored the proposal, Don Juan would continue his rapprochement with Franco during the 1950s, meeting secretly with General Franco at an estate in Extremadura owned by the Count of Ruiseñada at the end of 1954.

For its part, the Republican opposition, faced with the international recognition of Franco's regime, ran out of arguments, and guerrilla activity declined. The communists abandoned the guerrillas completely in 1952, while the anarchists would still carry out sporadic actions until 1963. Thus, from 1949 until the 1960s, the internal and exile anti-Francoist opposition experienced its "desert crossing". Attempts to rebuild the parties and workers' organizations in the underground were stopped by the police, as happened to the CNT in 1953 when its National Committee in the interior, chaired by Manuel Vallejo, was arrested; to the PSOE when that same year Tomás Centeno, president of the executive committee of the interior, was arrested and died during police interrogations; or to the PSUC, when its leader Joan Comorera was arrested in 1954 and sentenced by a court martial to thirty years in prison, dying in prison in 1958. That year the socialist Antonio Amat Guridi, Tomás Centeno's successor at the head of the PSOE's interior executive committee, was arrested and imprisoned.

From the end of 1948, Franco knew that no essential danger would call into question his "command", once the monarchist opposition had been "tamed" (with Prince Juan Carlos already in Spain), the guerrillas had been defeated, the Republican opposition in exile had been evicted and decapitated in the interior, and the international isolation of his regime had been broken. One symptom that the Franco regime already felt secure was the appointment in 1948 of a secretary general for the "single party" (now called "the Movement"), a position that had been vacant since 1945; another was that on April 7, 1948, the state of war that had existed since the beginning of the civil war was ended, although the military courts would continue to deal with political crimes under the Law of Banditry and Terrorism passed the previous year.

== Francoism from 1951 to 1959 ==
=== Integration into the Western bloc and splendor of National-Catholicism (1951–1955) ===
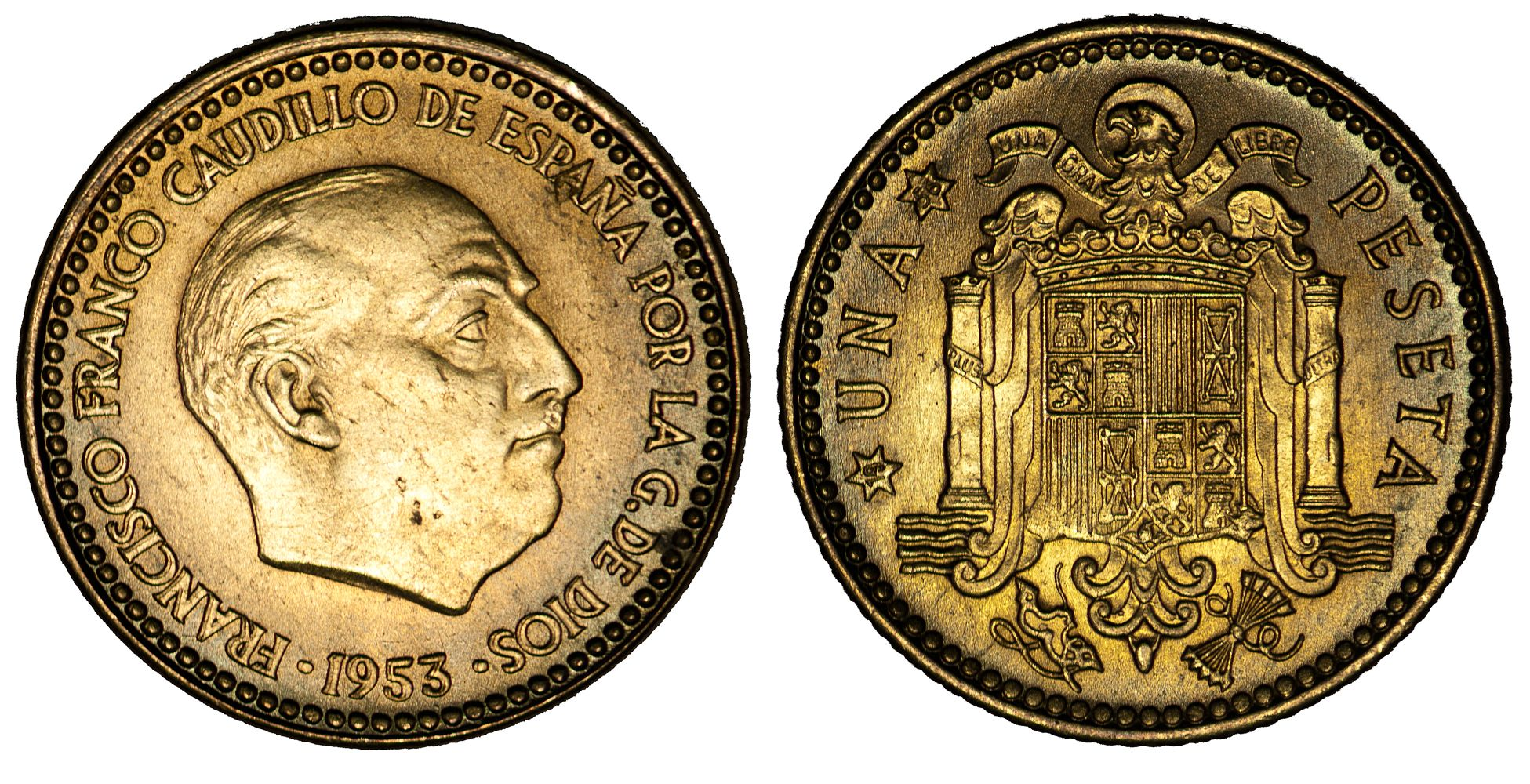
1 peseta coin minted in 1953, with the legend Francisco Franco Caudillo of Spain by the G. [Grace] of God (Francisco Franco Caudillo de España por la G. [Gracia] de Dios).

As Enrique Moradiellos has pointed out, "as a result of internal institutional changes and international rehabilitation, by the end of the 1950s the Franco regime was fully consolidated". However, in 1951, workers' protests returned as a result of poor working conditions and rising prices. The epicenter was Barcelona and the trigger was the significant increase in the price of streetcar fares, which was answered on March 1 by a boycott by the population that lasted several days and would end up achieving the cancellation of the measure. The success of the boycott (a safe form of protest that did not involve personal risk) was followed by a fairly widespread strike in the industrial area of Barcelona against the rising cost of living. At first the reaction of the police was weak (the civil governor would eventually be replaced because of this) and the captain general of Catalonia, the royalist Juan Bautista Sánchez refused to take the troops out on the streets, although during the following days measures of force were applied and the workers returned to their occupations. Protests and strikes also took place in other cities, such as Zaragoza, Bilbao, Pamplona and Madrid.

This social unrest forced General Franco to react, and on July 18 he appointed a new government which was to rectify in part the economic policy to ensure that social unrest was not reproduced. The new council of ministers, however, continued to be a cabinet with a predominance of political Catholicism —Martin Artajo continued to head Foreign Affairs and Joaquín Ruiz Giménez took charge of Education—. Finally, Carrero Blanco entered the cabinet, with the rank of undersecretary minister of the Presidency of the Government. In addition, the General Secretariat of the Movimiento Nacional regained ministerial rank, a post held by the Falangist Raimundo Fernández Cuesta.

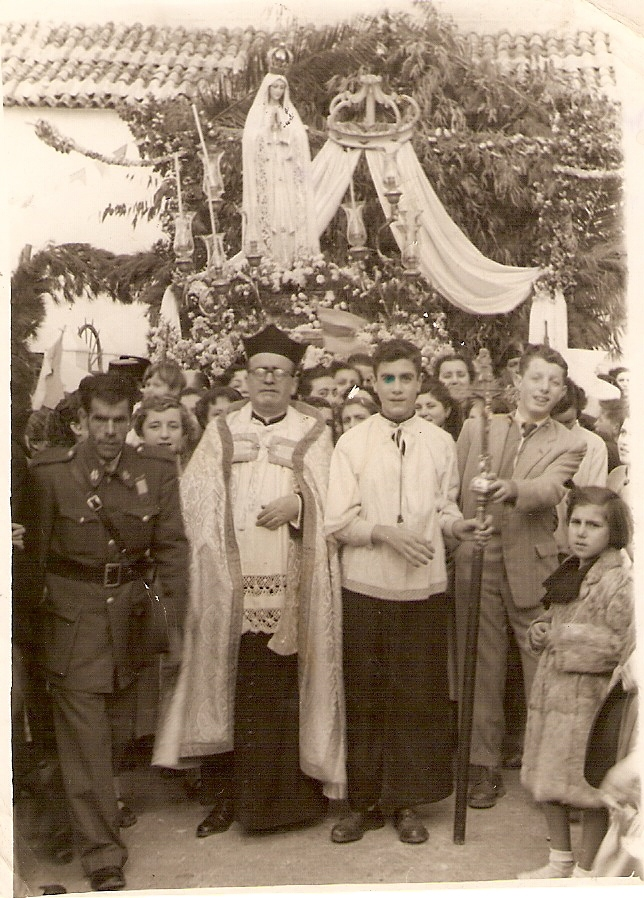
Pilgrimage in a village in Andalusia (1953). The 1950s were the years of the splendor of National-Catholicism.

After long negotiations, which on the Spanish side were led by two Catholic politicians —the Minister of Foreign Affairs, Alberto Martín-Artajo, and the ambassador to the Holy See, Fernando María Castiella— an agreement was reached on a new Concordat with the Catholic Church to replace that of 1851, which the Second Republic had left without effect. Its signing, which took place in Rome, where Martin Artajo went, was a vitally important step in the international recognition of the regime and also the ratification of the predominance that Francoism had granted to the Catholic Church in exchange for its total identification with the regime. In reality, what the Concordat did was to ratify the status quo already existing between Church and State since the civil war and, especially, since 1945 with the hegemony of "national Catholicism". From the signing of the Concordat, as Enrique Moradiellos has pointed out, "the triumph of national Catholicism was definitive and indisputable, becoming the official ideology of the State and the normative pattern of moral conduct, public and private, of Spanish society as a whole". A milestone in the identification of the Catholic Church with the Franco regime was the XXXV International Eucharistic Congress, which gathered hundreds of thousands of Catholics in Barcelona in May 1952. During the Congress, Cardinal Spellman, head of the American Church and a great friend of Pope Pius XII, went so far as to affirm: "Everyone in Spain loves Franco". On the other hand, after the signing of the Concordat, prayers would be said at all masses "for our Caudillo Francisco".

Negotiations with the United States for the installation of U.S. bases in Spanish territory in exchange for economic and military aid began in April 1952 —in July of the previous year, the Admiral Chief of Operations of the U.S. Navy had already met with Franco in Madrid, reaching an agreement in principle for military collaboration between the two countries—. The American delegation was headed by General August Kissner, George Traine and the ambassador in Madrid, Stanton Griffis, and the Spanish delegation by General Juan Vigón. The initial U.S. reluctance that the agreement implied a political endorsement of Franco was overcome after the election of the new President Dwight Eisenhower, who appointed James Dunn as ambassador in Madrid, who was less inflexible than his predecessor in accepting the conditions requested by the Spanish government. The agreement was finally signed on September 23, 1953, at the Santa Cruz Palace, headquarters of the Ministry of Foreign Affairs, but it did not have the status of a treaty, as the Spanish government requested, but of an "executive pact" between governments (agreement). For it to be a treaty it would have required the approval of the Senate, something impossible to achieve since the majority of members refused to support Franco's dictatorship.

The so-called Pactos de Madrid consisted of three agreements: the first concerned the supplies of war material that the United States was to provide to Spain; the second dealt with economic aid, which included the granting of credits; the third, and most important, concerned mutual defense aid, which consisted of the establishment of four U.S. military bases on Spanish territory. In this way, Spain was incorporated into the Western defense system, but without access to decision-making, since its access to NATO —which had just been founded in 1949— was vetoed. The bases were theoretically under the joint sovereignty of Spain and the United States, but there was an additional secret agreement, by which the United States could unilaterally decide when to use them in case of "evident communist aggression threatening the security of the West". On the other hand, atomic weapons were stored in them, despite the protests of Franco's authorities.

With the Madrid Pacts, Francoism, both internally and externally, was strengthened, although considered on a more realistic level, the agreements corroborated the situation of mere Spanish dependence with respect to its interested guarantor, the United States —which always considered Franco's Spain as a minor ally—.

After the agreement of the General Assembly in 1950, Spain was progressively integrated into the UN specialized agencies. The first was the World Meteorological Organization, followed by FAO, WHO and UNESCO. However, it was not until December 1955 that Spain became a full member of the UN, which was possible as a result of the thaw in relations between the two blocs after the death of Stalin in 1953, since "the idea of enlarging the UN to admit those countries that were on the losing side in the World War or were neutral, and which were now aligned with one or the other superpower", which was the case of Spain. Thus, on December 8, 1955, the UN General Assembly admitted 18 new members, among them Spain, together with Italy, Portugal, Hungary, Romania, Bulgaria, Albania, Austria and ten other countries. There were no votes against and only two abstentions, Mexico and Belgium. It was the end of Franco's isolation.

=== 1956 crises ===
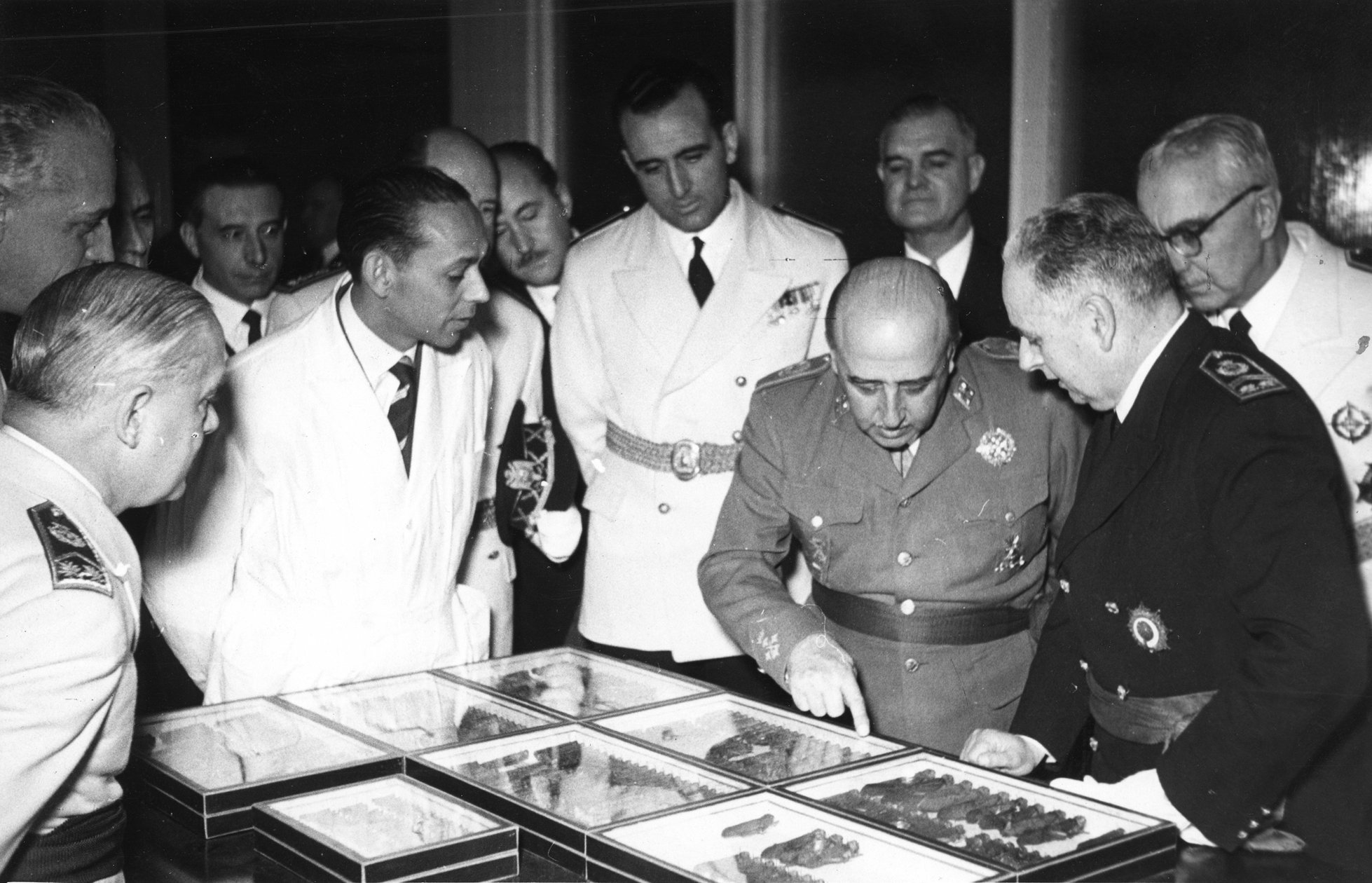
The Minister of National Education Joaquín Ruiz Giménez (in the center) with General Franco during the inauguration of the National Institute of Agrarian Research (1954).

The new Minister of Education appointed in 1951, the Catholic Joaquín Ruiz Giménez, tried to bring about a certain "opening" in the educational and cultural sphere, surrounding himself with a team of young intellectuals from the Falange: Pedro Laín Entralgo, Rector of the University of Madrid; Antonio Tovar, Rector of the University of Salamanca; and Torcuato Fernández Miranda, Rector of the University of Oviedo, who became Undersecretary of the Ministry. One of his greatest achievements was the unofficial rehabilitation of the philosopher José Ortega y Gasset, who returned to Spain from exile. He died in 1955 and his funeral was presided over by Minister Ruiz Giménez himself. However, the also Catholic Rafael Arias Salgado, who from the new Ministry of Information and Tourism was carrying out a fundamentalist policy, gave slogans to the press to emphasize Ortega's lack of religiosity and some bishops even referred to the "Masonic stench" that his corpse exuded. Another result of Ruiz Giménez's policy was the magazine Alcalá, founded in 1952, written by Dionisio Ridruejo, Xavier Zubiri or José Luis López Aranguren, in addition to Laín Entralgo and Tovar.

The climate of openness initiated by Ruiz Giménez led to the formation of the first student opposition groups. One of his first initiatives was the celebration of the Encuentros entre la Poesía y la Universidad organized by the student Enrique Múgica Herzog, who got them sponsored by the Aula de Cultura del SEU, and in which the poets Dionisio Ridruejo, Luis Rosales, Gerardo Diego, Luis Felipe Vivanco and José Hierro took part. The success of the Encuentros encouraged their promoters to organize a Congress of Young Writers, so that "the young university students could exchange their ideas with some comfort, giving occasion for a dialogue that would enlighten them better than a silence that would poison them", as Ruidruejo wrote in his Memoirs. They found the enthusiastic support of the rector of the University of Madrid Laín Entralgo and the Minister Ruiz Giménez, but finally the Congress did not take place because it was prohibited by the Minister of the Interior Blas Pérez González, since according to a report prepared by the General Directorate of Security it was organized by two anti-Francoist groups, one communist —headed by Múgica Herzog and including the "atheist" Ramón Tamames, the also "atheist" and "communist" Javier Pradera or the "rabid atheist and recalcitrant blasphemer" Fernando Sánchez Dragó— and another liberal institutionist group led by Javier Muguerza and inspired by the philosopher Julián Marías.

For their part, the Falangists decided to demonstrate their power and unity in the face of the rise of the Catholics and in October 1953 they held the First National Congress of the Movement in Madrid, in which, in addition to the Minister-Secretary General Fernandez Cuesta, other prominent camisas viejas such as José Antonio Girón, Minister of Labor, took part and referred to the "National Revolution". Thus, a declaration was approved in which it was stated that the Falange would not consent "under any pretext whatsoever to the illegitimate actions of cliques that would try to undermine its condition of sole inspirer of the State and, consequently, the authority of its Chief and Caudillo". But in the multitudinous closing ceremony, General Franco put limits to those purposes: "The Falange is above contingencies... flanking and supporting the constituent force of our Army". In spite of this, among the most radical sectors of the Falange linked to the SEU and the Frente de Juventudes, the rejection of the future Monarchy was spreading, as was made clear in the summer of 1955 during the visit of Juan Carlos de Borbón to a camp of the Frente de Juventudes, being received with the following ditty —the national delegate of Juventures José Antonio Elola-Olaso was fulminantly dismissed by Franco as a result of another similar incident that took place during the funeral for José Antonio Primo de Rivera held on November 20, 1955, in El Escorial presided over by Franco and during which the cry was heard: "We don't want idiot kings! "—:

Viva, viva la Revolución!

Long live, long live Falange de las JONS! Death, death to capital! Long live the Syndical State! We do not want idiot kings who do not know how to govern. We will implement, because we want the Syndical State

Down with the King!

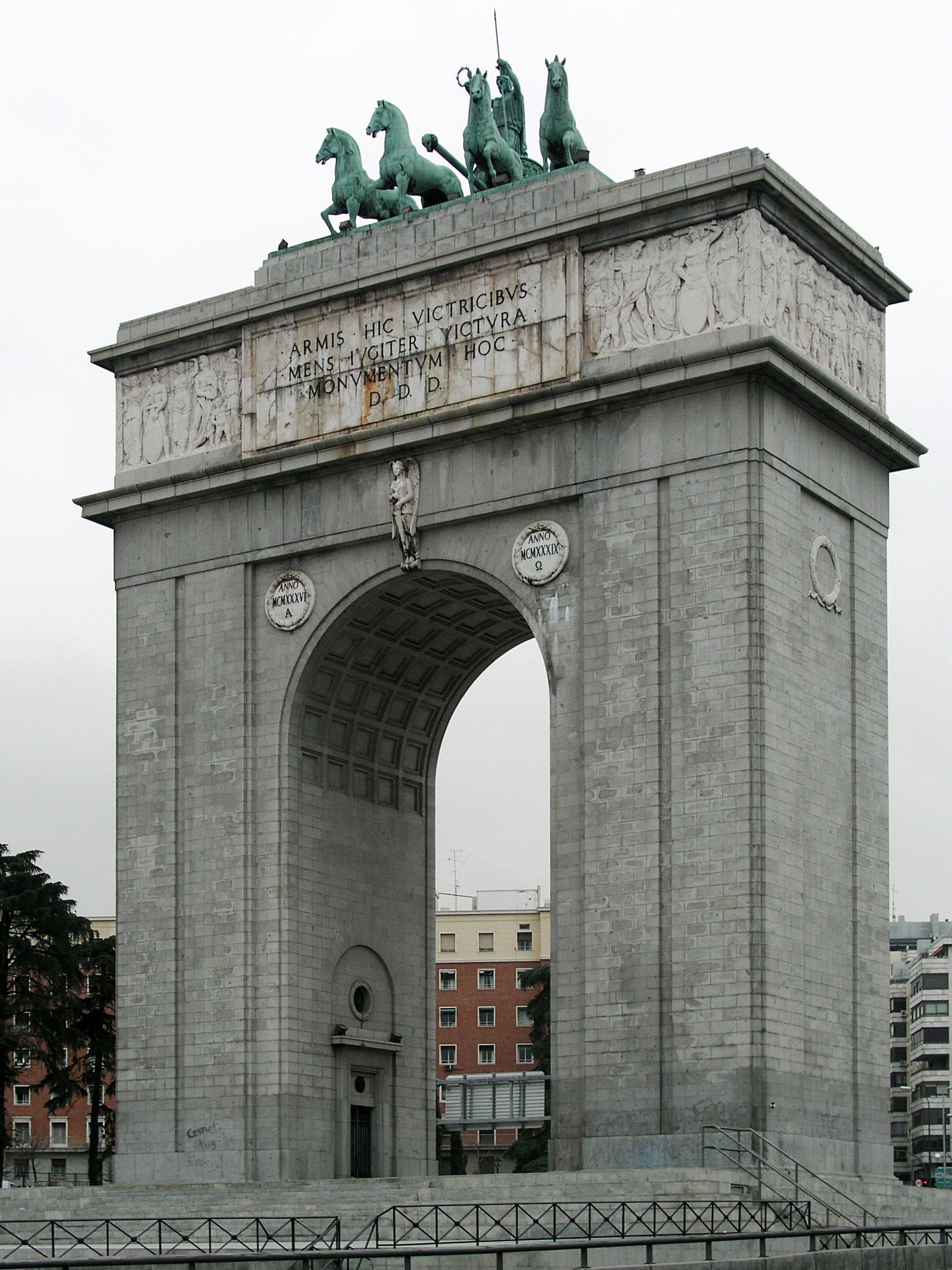
Arco de la Victoria, erected in Madrid between 1950 and 1956 in commemoration of Franco's victory in the Spanish Civil War.

In spite of the suspension of the Congreso de Escritores Jóvenes, student activism continued and on January 16, 1956, they held a meeting in the cultural circle Tiempo Nuevo, in Madrid, in which they drew up a manifesto, managing to obtain 3,000 signatures of support. In this manifesto they called for the convocation of a National Congress of Students, whose delegates would be elected outside the SEU. The Falangist students reacted by violently storming the Law School. Shortly afterwards, on February 9, new violent incidents took place at the University of Madrid as a result of a confrontation between students who were demonstrating in favor of free elections to the SEU and a group of Falangists who had just come from celebrating the annual ceremony of the "Day of the Fallen Student". As a result of the brawl, a Falangist student was seriously wounded by a bullet in the neck (probably shot by one of his companions, who were armed). The climate of crisis spread rapidly (there was a rumour that the Falangists were preparing a night of the long knives) and the police proceeded to arrest those responsible for calling the student assembly who, to their surprise, turned out to be some of them former Falangists and sons of personalities of the regime.

The seriousness of the crisis —the first major internal crisis the Regime had to face since 1942— was made clear by the two measures immediately taken by General Franco. On February 11 he decreed for the first time since its promulgation the suspension of Articles 14 and 18 of the Fuero de los Españoles, and the University of Madrid was closed. On February 16 he dismissed the two ministers "responsible" for the events: Ruiz Giménez and Fernández Cuesta, Minister-Secretary General of the Movement on whom the SEU depended.

The events of February 1956 demonstrated that, after 15 years, the Regime was losing control of the youth in the most important universities, where it had previously had limited support or, at least, no resistance, and constituted the first glimmer of a rebirth of internal opposition, which came not from the Republic, but from a new generation that had grown up under the Regime in the 1950s, and which was beginning to organize itself as opposition to the Franco dictatorship regardless of the camp in which they themselves or their parents had militated during the civil war. Thus, "the events of 1956 marked a turning point in the development of anti-Francoism".

The communists were the first to grasp this new fact and before any other party they consecrated it as an official strategy. Thus, in the plenary session of the Central Committee of the PCE held in Prague in August 1956, which also supported the Soviet invasion of Hungary, the new policy of National Reconciliation was approved, which sought understanding with all the anti-Francoist forces regardless of which side they had fought on in the Civil War. However, the task was not going to be easy, and both the "Day of National Reconciliation" of May 5, 1958, and the "National Peaceful Strike" of June 18, 1959, called by the PCE were a complete failure.

=== 1957 crisis ===
Map of the Ifni War in 1957 and, after the conflict, in 1958.

In March 1956, France granted independence to the area of Morocco that was under its Protectorate, which forced the Spanish government to do the same a month later —when independence riots also took place in its protectorate—. In August of the following year, the new State of Morocco also claimed sovereignty over the enclave of Ifni, a territory on the Moroccan Atlantic coast under Spanish sovereignty which was not part of the Protectorate, and therefore was not ceded at the time of independence. Thus, in November 1957 the territory of Ifni was attacked by irregular Moroccan troops, but the Spanish army managed to repel the aggression —62 Spanish soldiers died—. The Spanish colony of the Sahara was also attacked, and the assailants were again repulsed, although at the cost of higher casualties —241 Spanish soldiers died—. The Ifni war was silenced by the press and it was not until February 1958 that normality was restored in both territories. In the case of the Sahara it was achieved by the entry of French troops from Mauritania at the request of the Spanish government "when Spain was on the verge of losing that undeclared war". During the conflict the Spanish Army could not use the American war material delivered under the Madrid Pacts of 1953 due to Washington's express prohibition.

With his return to government after the crisis of February 1956, the Falangist José Luis Arrese saw an opportunity (perhaps the last one) to carry forward the old project of institutionalizing Francoism by strengthening the powers of the Falangist "single party" and thus lessening the monarchist and Catholic orientation that had predominated since 1945. But when in the autumn the drafts of the three "fundamental laws" he was preparing —the Fundamental Principles of the National Movement, the Organic Law of the National Movement and the Law for the Organization of the Government— were made public, a great opposition to the project was unleashed within the Army, the Catholic Church, the rest of the "families" of the regime and the government itself —including Admiral Carrero Blanco—, since it granted enormous powers to the "single party", specifically to its Secretary General and its National Council —although these powers would only be really effective after the death of General Franco, and therefore would only affect his successor—. What Arrese intended, then, was to build an authentic national-syndicalist State which, as he had said in a Falangist rally held in March 1956 in Valladolid, would satisfy the dissatisfaction of the Falangists "because many of our revolutionary aspirations are pending realization and because the society that surrounds us is very unjust and very dirty".

Franco's monarchists labeled the project as "totalitarian" and the ecclesiastical hierarchy denounced it for being "in disagreement with the pontifical doctrines" and for not having "roots in the Spanish tradition", defending, instead, the promotion of a "true organic representation" instead of a "single party dictatorship", as was Fascism in Italy, National Socialism in Germany or Peronism in the Argentine Republic" —in December 1956 three cardinals, among them Cardinal Primate Pla and Deniel, met with Franco in El Pardo to deliver a declaration against Arrese's project—. Faced with such an accumulation of pressures, and with the priority that he began to give to economic problems, the Generalissimo decided in February 1957 to shelve sine die the Arrese project. Only the Principles of the Movement project would see the light of day the following year, but totally transformed.

To add to this crisis, General Franco changed the government on February 25, moving Arrese to the new Ministry of Housing and appointing José Solís Ruiz, a legal colonel responsible for the Spanish Trade Union Organization, as the new Minister Secretary General of the Movement. On the other hand, as in other moments of crisis, Franco relied on the military and appointed eight of them as ministers.

=== Law of Principles of the Movement and exhaustion of the autarkic model (1957–1959) ===
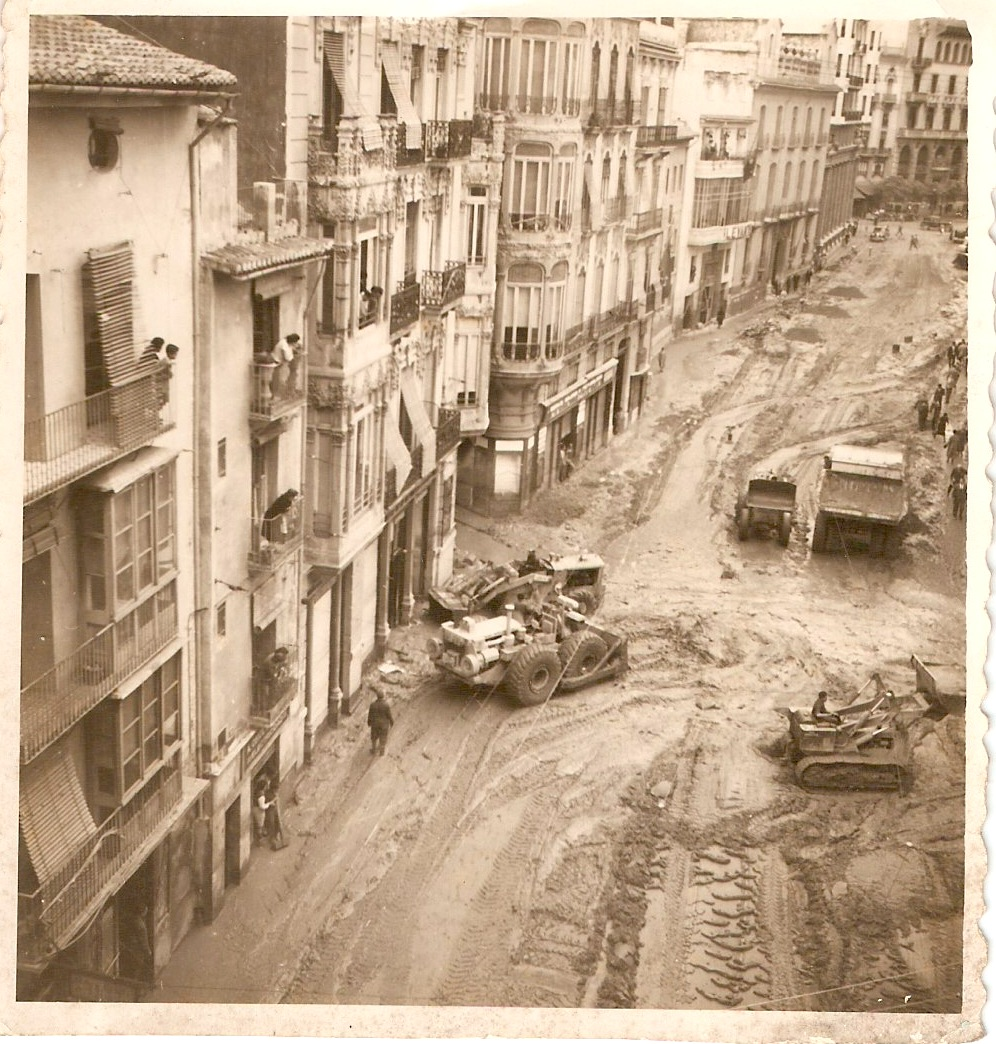
Cleaning mud in a central street of Valencia after the overflowing of the Turia river that flooded the city in October 1957.

Faced with the serious worsening of the economic situation, Admiral Carrero Blanco convinced Franco to appoint to the economic ministries two "technicians" who had in common that they belonged to a secular Catholic institute called Opus Dei —Alberto Ullastres, who would be in charge of the Ministry of Commerce, and Mariano Navarro Rubio, in charge of the Treasury—. Carrero Blanco had come into contact with this group through a young law professor, Laureano López Rodó, also a member of Opus Dei, whom Carrero had just appointed to a high position in his ministry, the Undersecretary of the Presidency. These three politicians, like the teams that accompanied them and those that followed them, came from the anti-democratic and authoritarian Catholic world, but they did not accede to the government to carry out a "Catholic policy"; rather, their objective was to implement a program of rationalization and economic liberalization linked to a reform of the State Administration. As soon as the government was formed in February 1957, López Rodó created the Office of Economic Coordination and Planning (OCYPE) in the Presidency of the Government, directed by himself and to which Ullastres and Navarro Rubio belonged.

With regard to the reform of the Administration, two important laws were passed —the Law on the Legal Regime of the State Administration, of July 1957, which did not mention the National Movement; and the Law on Administrative Procedure, of July 1958— which would be completed in 1964 with the approval of the Law on Civil Servants of the State.

Of Arrese's old Falangist project, only the first draft bill he prepared became a reality, although it was a new version prepared by Carrero Blanco and his team of "technocrats" headed by López Rodó, who shared with him the project of institutionalizing the Franco regime in the form of a traditional and Catholic monarchy, although an advocate of a "free" market economy. Thus, its final wording was even further away from the "26 points of Falange". It was promulgated by General Franco on May 29, 1958, as "caudillo of Spain, conscious of my responsibility before God and before History", and constituted the sixth "fundamental law" of Francoism. It defined the Movement not as a party or an organization, but as a "communion" (in the Carlist manner) and the Franco regime was characterized as a "traditional, Catholic, social and representative monarchy", a principle "permanent and unalterable by its very nature". It also reiterated the "Catholic, Apostolic and Roman" confessionalism of the Spanish State and its commitment to the "participation of the people" in the tasks of government through the "organic representation" of the "natural entities of social life: family, municipality and trade union".

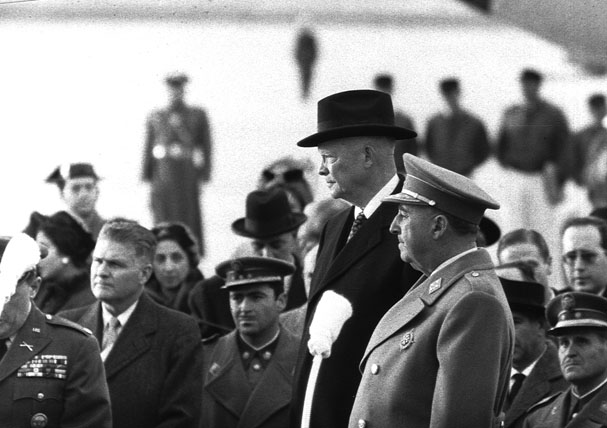
The visit of U.S. President Eisenhower to Spain in 1959 is considered the symbol of the end of the international isolation of the Franco regime.

From 1958 onwards, strikes —which continued to be a crime— reappeared, especially in Asturias and Catalonia, centered on wage claims since inflation was causing a fall in real wages. In particular, the Asturian hard coal mining industry was the scene of recurrent strikes which provided a new mechanism of workers' representation which was to have singular success in the future: the workers' commission elected from among the strikers, apart from the "union liaisons" and the "sworn company spokesmen" of the Francoist trade union organization, to present their claims directly to the management of their company or to the employers. The intensity of the Asturian strike movement was such that it led Franco to decree on March 14, 1958, the second suspension of the Fuero de los Españoles and the state of emergency in the region for four months.

The 1950s closed with two very important events in the history of Franco's regime: the inauguration on April 1, 1959 –20 years after the end of the Civil War— of the Valley of the Fallen, the monument commemorating the "Generalissimo" to his victory in the Civil War and which was to house his remains when he died; and the brief visit to Madrid of the president of the United States, General Eisenhower, in December 1959, none other than the former commander-in-chief of the allied armies that had defeated the fascist powers in World War II. This visit, according to Moradiellos, "probably constituted the international apotheosis of Franco's dictatorship".

== See also ==
- Opposition to Francoism

== Bibliography ==
- Barciela, Carlos (2002). "Guerra civil y primer franquismo (1936-1959)". Historia económica de España. Siglos X-XX (in Spanish) (Francisco Comín, Mauro Hernández and Enrique Llopis (eds.) ed.). Barcelona: Crítica. ISBN 84-8432-366-8.
- De Riquer, Borja (2010). La dictadura de Franco. Vol. 9 de la Historia de España, dirigida por Josep Fontana y Ramón Villares (in Spanish). Barcelona: Crítica/Marcial Pons. ISBN 978-84-9892-063-5.
- Gallo, Max (1971) [1969]. Historia de la España franquista [Histoire de l'Espagne franquiste] (in Spanish). Dépôt légal: 52.657 (Premier trimestre 1972). Paris: Ruedo ibérico.
- García Delgado, José Luis (2000). "La economía". Franquismo. El juicio de la historia (in Spanish) (José Luis García Delgado (coord.) ed.). Madrid: Temas de Hoy. ISBN 84-8460-070-X.
- Gil Pecharromán, Julio (2008). Con permiso de la autoridad. La España de Franco (1939-1975) (in Spanish). Madrid: Temas de Hoy. ISBN 978-84-8460-693-2.
- Heine, Hartmut Heine (1983). La oposición política al franquismo. De 1939 a 1952 (in Spanish). Grijalbo: Crítica. ISBN 84-7423-198-1.
- Juliá, Santos (1999). Un siglo de España. Política y sociedad (in Spanish). Madrid: Marcial Pons. ISBN 84-9537903-1.
- Moradiellos, Enrique (2000). La España de Franco (1939-1975). Política y sociedad (in Spanish). Madrid: Síntesis. ISBN 84-7738-740-0.
- Payne, Stanley G. (1997). El primer franquismo. Los años de la autarquía (in Spanish). Madrid: Historia 16-Temas de Hoy. ISBN 84-7679-325-1.
- Preston, Paul (1998) [1993]. Franco "Caudillo de España" [Franco. A Biography] (in Spanish). First edition in Mitos Bolsillo. Barcelona: Grijalbo Mondadori. ISBN 84-397-0241-8.
- Suárez Fernández, Luis (1984). Francisco Franco y su tiempo. Tomo II. Generalísimo de la Guerra Civil (in Spanish). Madrid: Fundación Nacional Francisco Franco. ISBN 84-85993-05-5.
- Suárez Fernández, Luis (2011). Franco. Los años decisivos. 1931-1945 (in Spanish). Barcelona: Ariel. ISBN 978-84-344-1332-0.
- Tusell, Javier (1997). Historia de España. Vol. XIII. La época de Franco. Desde el fin de la Guerra Civil a la muerte de Franco (1939-1975) (in Spanish). Madrid: Espasa-Calpe. ISBN 84-239-8946-1.
- Tusell, Javier (2011). Spain: From Dictatorship to Democracy, 1939 to the present. Translated by Rosemary Clark. Wiley-Blackwell. ISBN 9781444342727.

Preceded by Spanish Civil War	First Francoism	Succeeded by Second Francoism
