= María Elósegui =

Spanish philosopher and jurist (born 1957)

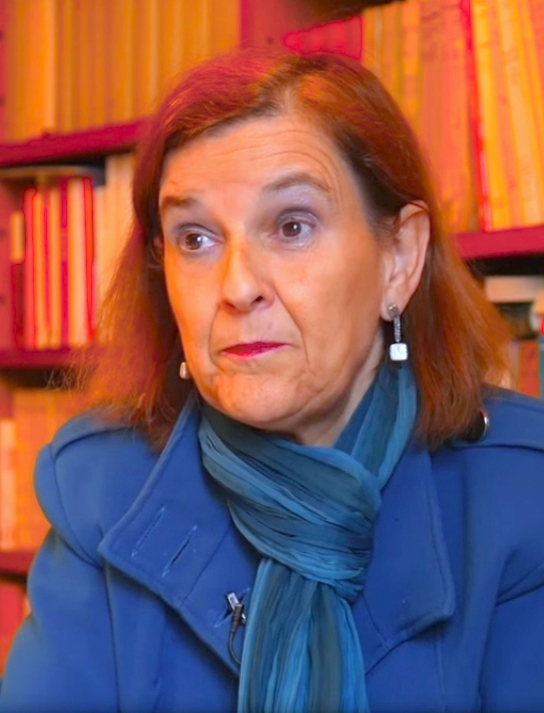

Judge at the European Court of Human Rights
- Incumbent
- Assumed office 2018
- Preceded by: Luis López Guerra

Personal details
- Born: María Elósegui Itxaso; 7 December 1957 (age 68) San Sebastián, Spain
- Education: Universidad de Navarra

María Elósegui Itxaso (born 7 December 1957) is a Spanish jurist, philosopher and Professor of Philosophy of Law at the Faculty of Law at the University of Zaragoza. She was appointed in January 2018 as a judge at the European Court of Human Rights (ECHR).

== Education ==
Maria Elósegui graduated with a PhD from the University of Navarra in 1987 and followed up on her studies with a second master's in philosophy at the University of Glasgow in 1989. Following this, she studied law at the University of Sain-Louis, Brussels, Belgium from where she graduated with a MSc in 1994. She obtained a Doctor of Juridical Science from the University of Navarra in 2002.

== Professional career ==
Between 1982 and 1988 she taught philosophy in Bilbao, and from 1988 to 1989 she researched at the Glasgow University. She became a Professor of Philosophy of Law at the University of Zaragoza in 1994 and lectured until 2018. She was also assigned as a member of the European Commission against Racism and Intolerance (ECRI) between 2013 and 2017. Since 2018, she has been the representative of Spain in the European Court of Human Rights, succeeding Luis López Guerra.

=== Controversies ===
In 2018, she partly dissented with the rest of the ruling judges at the ECHR and stated in her opinion that an administrative or civil sanction against the public protest of the Pussy Riot would not be an undue interference with the applicants' freedom of expression. Pussy Riot had performed a protest performance at the Cathedral of Christ the Saviour in Moscow in 2012 against the return to power of Vladimir Putin. In her separate opinion, Elósegui concurred with the majority of judges that there had been several violations of the ECHR based on the Internet ban of the video, and that the criminal sanction applied to the Pussy Riot was excessive.

== Publications ==
During her career, she published numerous books concerning the rule of law, with the exception of one about Peine del Viento.

== Personal life ==
Elósegui is the daughter of engineer José María Elósegui and a sister to the film director and documentary filmmaker José María Elósegui, who in 2008 released the documentary about the Peine del Viento, a well known sculpture in San Sebastian. Maria Elosegui also wrote a book about the sculpture to which her father collaborated as an engineer. Her sister, Dr. Lucía Elósegui, is the transplant coordinator to the University Hospital of San Sebastian.
