= Luis López Guerra =

Spanish judge (born 1947)

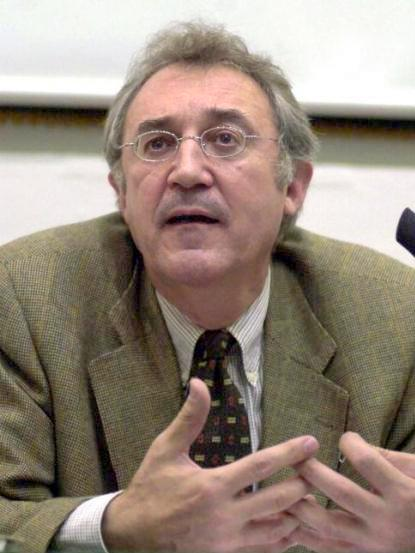

Judge of the European Court of Human Rights in respect of Spain
- In office 1 February 2008 – 1 February 2018
- Succeeded by: María Elósegui

Personal details
- Born: 15 November 1947 (age 78) León, Spain

Luis López Guerra (born 11 November 1947) is a Spanish judge born in León who served as Judge of the European Court of Human Rights until 2018 in respect of Spain.

He also served as Vice President of the General Council of the Judiciary from 1996 to 2001.
